= World record loop =

Aircraft completing an aerobatic loop

The world record loop is the record for the highest number of aircraft to successfully complete an aerobatic loop while flying in formation. The current record is 22 aircraft. The record was set by the Royal Air Force aerobatic team, the Black Arrows, who successfully looped 22 Hawker Hunter jet aircraft every day of the September 1958 Society of British Aerospace Companies Farnborough Airshow, beating the previous record set by the Pakistan Air Force, who looped the 16 North American F-86 Sabres in February 1958. The record required the team to train pilots from other RAF squadrons. The team initially wanted to loop 20 aircraft, but additional aircraft were added to the formation in order to improve the formation's aesthetic appearance.

== History ==
=== Pakistani Record ===
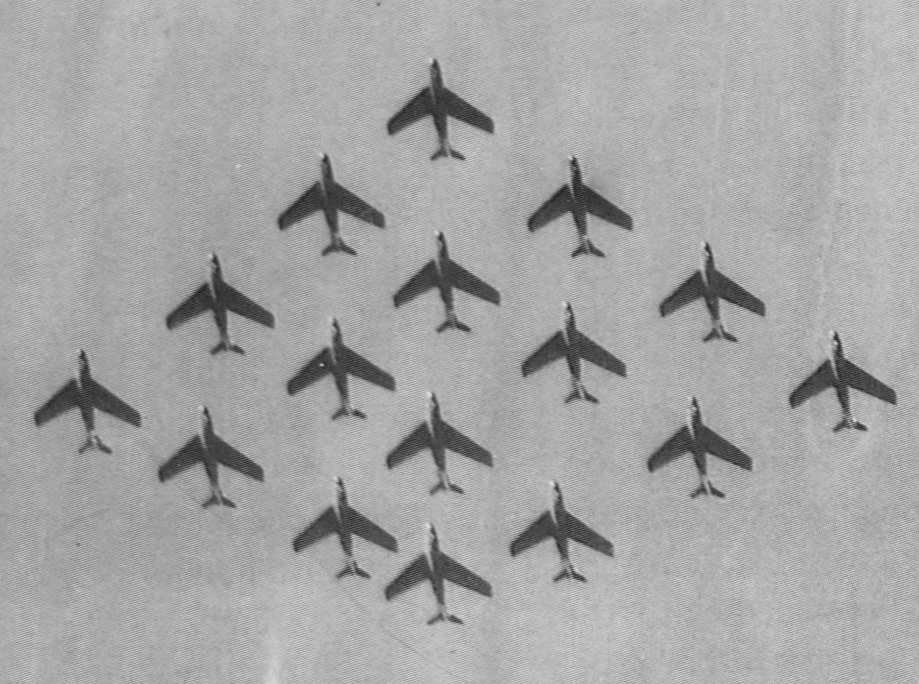
PAF Falcons set a record loop with 16 F-86 Sabres (1958)

King Zahir Shah arrives at PAF Station Mauripur with President Iskandar Mirza and Nahid Mirza, welcomed by Air Vice Marshal Asghar Khan and Air Commodore Nur Khan. Others in attendance are General Ayub Khan and chiefs of the Iraqi, Turkish, and Iranian Air Forces. The loop is showcased towards the end of the video. (1958)

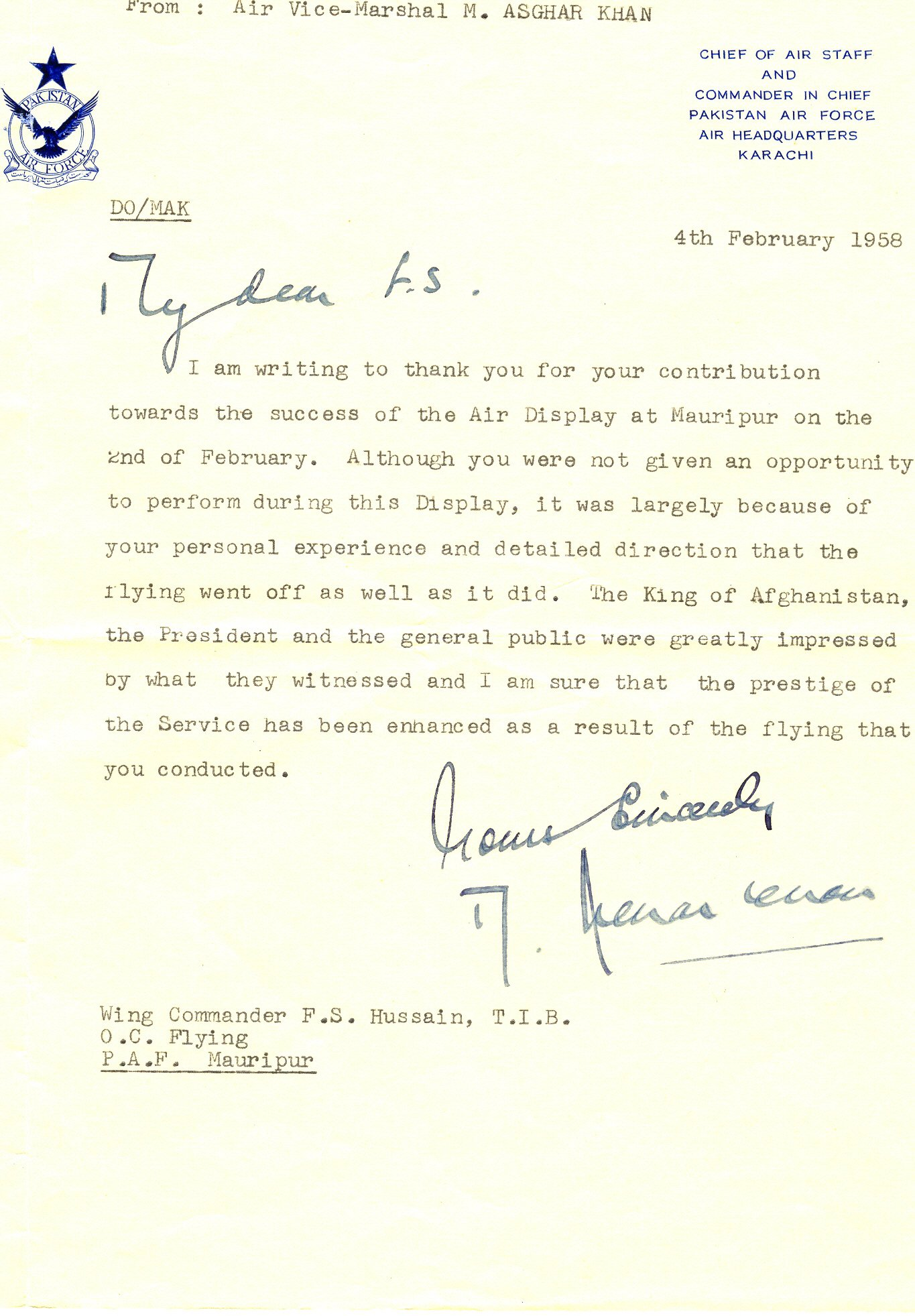
Commander-in-Chief Asghar Khan's letter to FS Hussain, 1958

On 2 February 1958, the PAF Falcons aerobatic team led by Wing Commander Mitty Masud set a world record by performing a 16 aircraft diamond loop in F-86 Sabres. 30,000 people were in attendance including, President Iskandar Ali Mirza, General Ayub Khan, Air Vice Marshal Asghar Khan, Air Commodore Nur Khan, Turkish Air Chief Suphi Göker, Iraqi Air Force Chief Abdul Kadhim Abaddi and Chief of the Imperial Iranian Air Force Hedayatollah Gilanshah, and the chief guest King Zahir Shah.

==== Pilots and planes ====
Despite not having the chance to perform in the loop, Wing Commander FS Hussain received a letter of appreciation from Air Vice Marshal Asghar Khan for training the pilots who achieved the feat.

The pilots who were involved in the record-breaking loop are listed below:

- Wg Cdr Mitty Masud
- Squadron Leader Nazir Latif
- Squadron Leader S U Khan
- Squadron Leader Ghulam Haider
- Squadron Leader S M Ahmad
- Squadron Leader Aftab Ahmad
- Squadron Leader Sadruddin Mohammad Hossain
- Flight Lieutenant Sajad Haider
- Flight Lieutenant Alauddin Ahmed
- Flight Lieutenant Hamed Anwar
- Flight Lieutenant Muniruddin Ahmad
- Flight Lieutenant M Arshad
- Flight Lieutenant Jamal A. Khan
- Flight Lieutenant A M K Lodhie
- Flight Lieutenant Wiqar Azim
- Flight Lieutenant Mervyn Middlecoat

=== British Record ===
In September 1958, the Black Arrows of No. 111 Squadron RAF were due to appear at the SBAC Air Show at Farnborough as the premier RAF Aerobatic team. Their Commanding Officer SqnLdr Roger L. Topp was about to hand over command of Treble-one squadron to SqnLdr Peter Latham and had requested permission from the RAF hierarchy to attempt to break the current world record for the number of aircraft to complete a loop, held since February 1958 by the Pakistan Air Force who had successfully looped 16 North American F-86 Sabres.

Permission for the attempt was received and a number of pilots and aircraft needed to complete the formation were seconded from other RAF fighter squadrons to practice for the show. Initially Topp intended to loop 20 aircraft in five lines of four aircraft. Having four aircraft in each line introduced difficulties for the pilots in the rear aircraft who became "thrust limited" over the peak of the loop and would lose position. Topp then decided to make the formation 7 lines of three aircraft. After this was trialled successfully, a fourth aircraft was added to the centre line to improve the aesthetics of the formation and the "22 Hunter Loop" formation was born.

Each day of the Farnborough show, the Black Arrows would start their display with the enormous formation of 22 Hawker Hunter F6's completing two consecutive loops; A world record which has never been equalled. After the loops, six outer aircraft would break off from the formation and the Black Arrows would return for a 16 aircraft roll, another unprecedented feat which, though subsequently equalled by other teams, remains unsurpassed.

==== Pilots and planes ====
The pilots and aircraft who were involved in the record-breaking loop are listed below.

- XG194 SqnLdr Roger Topp
- XG170 FltLt "Oakie" Oakford
- XG200 FlgOff Marcus"Oscar" Wild
- XF515 FltLt Alan Brindle
- XG201 FltLt Patrick Hine
- XG171 FltLt Brian Mercer
- XG592 FltLt George Ord
- XE563 FltLt Matthew Kemp
- XJ715 FlgOff Ron Smith
- XG189 FltLt Bob Smith
- XF416 FltLt Bob Barcilon
- XF424 FlgOff Roger Hymans
- XE616 FlgOff Peter Jennings
- XG190 FltLt Les Swart
- XE656 FlgOff Norman Lamb
- XE584 FltLt "Will" Scarlett
- XG193 FlgOff "CJ" Clayton-Jones
- XJ687 FltLt "Chas" Boyer
- XG266 FltLt Frank Travers-Smith
- XG160 FltLt Mike Thurley
- XF506 FlgOff Tony Aldridge
- XG191 FltLt David Edmondston

Airborne Spares:

- FltLt Channing Biss
- FlgOff Barry Vaughan

Extra pilots:

- FltLt Les Elgey
- FltLt Fred Hartley
