= No. 18 Squadron PAF =

No. 18 Squadron
- Active: Since February 1958 (67 years, 6 months)
- Country: Pakistan
- Allegiance: Pakistan Air Force
- Branch: GD(P)/Flying
- Type: Squadron
- Role: Combat / OCU
- Airbase: PAF Base Bholari
- Nickname(s): Sharp Shooters; Warhawks (formerly)
- Aircraft: PAC JF-17 Thunder
- Engagements: Afghanistan-Pakistan skirmishes; Bajaur Campaign; Operation Desert Hawk; 1965 Indo-Pakistani war; 1971 Indo-Pakistani war; Battle of Sueleimanki; Battle of Chumb
- Battle honours: Rajasthan 1965; Suleimanki 1971

Aircraft flown
- Attack: Dassault Mirage-VPA2
- Fighter: North American F-86F Sabre; Canadair Sabre
- Trainer: PAC JF-17B Thunder; Chengdu FT-7P

The No. 18 Squadron is a combat and training unit of the Pakistan Air Force's Southern Air Command (SAC) which operates dual seater JF-17B Thunder multi-role jets out of PAF Base Bholari, near Karachi in Sindh. The unit serves as an Operational Conversion Unit (OCU) which handles conversion of PAF fighter pilots onto the JF-17 fighter jet. Besides being the twin sibling of the PAF's famous 19 Squadron, it is also the sister squadron to the RJAF's No. 9 Squadron which was declared in 1986 as a sign of brotherly relations between Jordan and Pakistan and their respective air forces.

== History ==
Established on 1 February 1958 along with the No. 19 Squadron at PAF Base Mauripur, the squadron was operationalized with North American F-86F Sabres by June 1958 under the leadership of Squadron Leader Nazir Latif. Its primary role was ground attack and providing Close Air Support to the Pakistan Army whenever required. Due to its role, the squadron has been shifted to several PAF airbases over the years.

Shortly before the 1971 Indo-Pakistani war, the squadron had been re-equipped with Canadair Sabres (known as F-86E in the PAF) which went on to serve with the squadron till 1980 when all Sabres were grounded and later retired from frontline service. As a result, the squadron was disbanded for a short period of time till it was re-established at PAF Base Rafiqui in late 1981 with Dassault Mirage-VPA2 strike fighters. In 1982, the unit was awarded the squadron colors in honor of its services during both wartime and peacetime throughout the years. It was shifted to PAF Base Minhas but returned to Rafiqui airbase by 1989 during which it transferred to F/FT-7P Skybolts. In 1998, it was shifted to PAF Base MM Alam and re-established as an OCU tasked with training PAF fighter pilots on the newly inducted F-7P jets. Between 1998 and 2020, the OCU conducted 34 Conversion Courses after which it replaced its aging F-7s with the JF-17B Thunder dual seaters at PAF Base Minhas in October 2020. It was shifted to PAF Base Bholari in 2021 where it is currently conducting conversion of new fighter pilots on the JF-17.

=== Operational history ===
The squadron initially saw combat during the Dir-Bajaur Conflict which saw the unit's F-86F Sabres flying several CAS missions against Afghan backed insurgents in Pakistan's Federally Administered Tribal Areas. Various Psychological warfare missions were also flown in which airborne leaflets were dropped over enemy areas.

The squadron was later deployed in southern Pakistan as part of Operation Desert Hawk to provide air cover to the Pakistan Army which was engaged in heavy skirmishes with Indian forces at the Rann of Kutch however no aerial combat with Indian warplanes took place. By the time the 1965 Indo-Pakistani war broke out, the squadron was deployed at PAF Base Sargodha from where it undertook several combat missions. On the start of the Indian invasion of Pakistani Punjab on 6 September 1965, F-86 Sabres from the squadron flew ground attack sorties against spearheading units of the Indian army at Wagah and Attari areas near the border. These combat missions continued for 2 weeks in which heavy losses were inflicted upon the Indian invaders. One notable mission for which the squadron is well known for are the airstrikes on ammunition trains at Gurdaspur railway station in which two trains laden with ammunition, fuel and other supplies were strafed by Sabres of the 18 squadron. The resulting destruction from the airstrikes was severe such that the fires kept blazing for 36 hours. However, the squadron lost its commander (Squadron Leader Alauddin Ahmed) in this mission who was shot dead after ejecting from his F-86 which was damaged by the exploding trains. Fighter pilots of the squadron also remained active in aerial dogfights, Sqn Ldr Allauddin shot down an IAF Dassault Mystère IV before being KIA, Flight Lieutenant Saleem shot down an Indian army HAL Krishak and Flying Officer Qais shot down an Indian light communications aircraft. By the end of the war, the squadron commander was the only person to be lost from the squadron.

18 Squadron saw heavy engagements during the 1971 Indo-Pakistani war. While being part of the 33rd Wing at PAF Base Sargodha, the squadron's Canadair Sabres were deployed to support the army's 105 Independent brigade at Suleimanki headworks. Further north in Azad Kashmir, they provided air support to the army's 28 Division in the Battle of chumb. Furthermore, the squadron's fighters were put on Combat air patrols over the battlefields of Shakargarh. By the end of the 1971 war, the squadron had shot down 4 Indian warplanes (1 Mig-21 and 3 Su-7s) while damaging two more Su-7s all of which were a generation ahead of the Canadair Sabres the squadron was operating. Subsequently, Flight Lieutenant Maqsood Amir and Flying Officer Taloot Mirza were awarded the Tamgha-i-Jurat.

During President Emomali Rahmon's official visit to Pakistan in 2021, JF-17s from the 18 squadron escorted the Tajik presidential Boeing 737 upon its arrival in Pakistani airspace.

=== Affiliation with RJAF's 9 Squadron ===
In 1985 the squadron was visited by the RJAF's 9 Squadron (which at the time was operating F-5E jets) who declared the Warhawks as their sister unit as a sign of good relations between the Kingdom of Jordan and Islamic Republic of Pakistan. Ever since, both squadrons pay goodwill visits to each other's airbases in their respective countries.

== See also ==
- List of Pakistan Air Force squadrons
