= PAF Falcons =

Disbanded aerobatics display team of the Pakistan Air Force

'Falcons
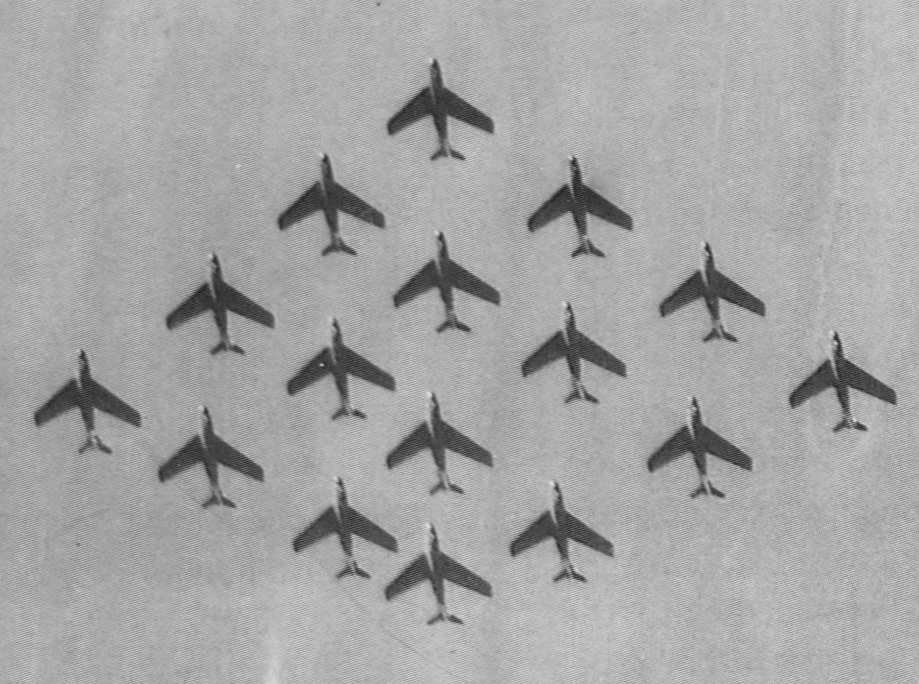
- 16 F-86 Sabres of the PAF's Falcons aerobatics team execute a World record loop in February 1958.
- Active: 1956–1966
- Disbanded: 1966
- Country: Pakistan
- Allegiance: Pakistan Air Force
- Role: Aerobatic flight display team
- Airbase: PAF Base Mauripur
- Aircraft: 16x North American F-86 Sabre

Commanders
- Notable commanders: Zafar Masud

The Falcons (Urdu: باز) is a disbanded aerobatics display team of the Pakistan Air Force (PAF) which flew North American F-86 Sabres and is known for executing a World record loop with 16 F-86 Sabres during an aerial display on 2 February 1958 at Mauripur. The team inspired the British RAF's Black Arrows which went on to beat the record with 22 Hawker Hunters.

== History ==
Originally established with four Sabres in 1956 under the leadership of the PAF's well known stunt pilot Wing Commander Zafar Masud. The team's strength rose to seven and then nine by 1958. In December 1957, on the request of the air force's C in C at the time (ACM Asghar Khan), the team's strength was risen at a staggering 16 Sabres. By this time, Zafar's team consisted of six squadron leaders Bill Latif, SM Ahmad, SU Khan, Ghulam Haider, Aftab Ahmad, Sadruddin; and nine Flight lieutenants which were Sajad Haider, Muniruddin Ahmad, AU Ahmad, Hameed Anwar, Arshad, Jamal Khan, Wiqar Azim AMK Lodhie and Mervyn Middlecoat. Many of these pilots went on to participate in the 1965 Indo-Pakistani war while some eventually rose to become the PAF's Chief. The team performed various aerobatic maneuvers including barrel rolls, 4 & 8 point rolls, Barrel rolls etc.

Not much is known about the later history of the Falcons team though they were reportedly disbanded in 1966.

=== 1958 World record loop ===
After the team's number was increased to 16 in December 1957, the air force chief chose the team to carry out the world record loop during the Afghan King Mohammad Zahir Shah's state visit to Pakistan on 2 February 1958 and were given four weeks to prepare for the occasion. The Falcons with 16 F-86 Sabres successfully executed it at PAF Base Mauripur at Karachi in front of 30,000 spectators which included leaders of both Afghanistan and Pakistan.

== See also ==
- Saudi Falcons
- Ukrainian Falcons
- Red Arrows
