= Sajad Haider =

Pakistani Air Commodore (1932–2025)

Sajad Haider SJ
- سجاد حیدر
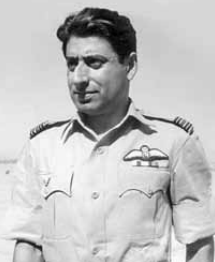
- Haider as a Squadron Leader, 1965
- Born: Sayed Sajjad Haider (Note: He dropped the second 'J' from his name later on in life. In his words: "In 1976, someone suggested I knock off one 'J' and that would change my life. I did that quite against my own convention of never believing in such superstitions. Well, I am glad I did because life changed for me dramatically!"); Sargodha, Punjab Province (British India)
- Died: 3 January 2025; Islamabad, Pakistan
- Spouses: Iffat (m. 1960; div. 1969) Tahira (m. 1970; div. 1971) Faryda (m. 1980; div. 1997)
- Children: 3
- Military career
- Branch: Pakistan Air Force
- Service years: 1952–1980
- Rank: Air Commodore
- Nickname: Nosey Haider
- Commands: No. 14 Squadron PAF; No. 19 Squadron PAF
- Known for: Leading the Pathankot airstrike during the Air War of 1965
- Conflicts: Waziristan rebellion (1948–1954); Indo-Pakistani War of 1965; Air war operations; Pathankot Airstrike; Indo-Pakistani War of 1971

Personal details
- Resting place: Islamabad, Pakistan
- Education: St. Francis' Grammar School; Forman Christian College; RPAF College; PAF Staff College; German Air Force Officer Training School; 157th Flying Instructors' School, USA; Fighter Leaders' School, Mauripur; Joint Service Defence College; National Defence College, Islamabad; Quaid-i-Azam University (MSc)
- Awards: See list
- Website: https://www.sajadhaider.com/

Sayed Sajad Haider (Note: Urdu: سید سجاد حیدر) SJ (died 3 January 2025), nicknamed Nosy Haider (Note: In his memoir, Haider stated that Alauddin "Butch" Ahmed gave him the nickname.) was a Pakistani fighter pilot and Air Commodore in the Pakistan Air Force. He was also an author, columnist, businessman, defence analyst, political commentator, and philanthropist.

Born in Sargodha, Haider and his family later moved to Balochistan, where he grew up alongside Akbar Bugti. By 1953, he graduated from the RPAF College, commissioned into the Royal Pakistan Air Force, and completed his Fighter Conversion Course on the Tempest at Mauripur, coming in second place behind Sarfraz Rafiqui. In 1954, he flew in aerial operations against the Faqir of Ipi. Shortly after, he joined the No. 11 Sqn, the RPAF's first jet unit. Recognised for his performance in air combat, he trained on the F-86 Sabre in the United States and later joined the PAF Falcons aerobatic team, which set a world record with a 16-aircraft formation loop in 1958.

As Squadron Leader of No. 19 Sqn, he gained fame for leading a devastating blitzkrieg attack on the Pathankot airbase during the Indo-Pakistani war of 1965, where he destroyed four Indian aircraft on the ground, 11 tanks, and damaged another three. His formation accounted for the destruction of 13 enemy aircraft, including two MiG-21s. The following day, he led another formation attack on Srinagar Air Force Station, where they destroyed three more aircraft.

A career rife with events that included false accusations, Haider, along with 13 other PAF officers, was falsely accused of treason and mutiny in a supposed coup against then President Zulfikar Ali Bhutto in 1973. This accusation, devised by Air Chief Zafar Chaudhry, his deputy Saeedullah Khan, and third in command, Khaqan Abbasi, was later revealed to be completely baseless. Consequently, Haider and some officers were exonerated while Chaudhry and Khan were fired.

In the mid-1970s, as air attaché to Washington, D.C., he rejected a bribe from an American executive who was subsequently fired. In cahoots with Pakistani, Iranian, and American high-level officials, this sacked executive would then be behind a plot that accused Haider of making disparaging remarks about the Shah of Iran, causing diplomatic tensions between Iran–Pakistan. The scheme was later exposed, revealing that they had fabricated the lie in retaliation for Haider rejecting the bribe, as they aimed to profit from illicit defence deals with the PAF.

In late 1979, Haider confronted President General Zia-ul-Haq (Note: See: Haider's dissent against Zia.) during a top-secret meeting at the General Headquarters. He criticised the intelligence agencies for manipulating the truth, suppressing the press, and conveyed his disillusionment with the military's conduct towards civilians. Refusing to serve any longer under Zia's rule, he resigned from the air force in 1980, ending an illustrious career with very few assets.

He formed an aviation, defence, and communications company called Cormorant. It ceased operations in 1990 after he refused to take kickbacks from two Pakistan army generals of the Defence Procurement Division, including the Director General.

== Early life and education ==
Born in Sargodha, Syed Sajjad Haider was the son of Fazal Hussain Shah (1882–1986) and Rashida Begum.

He attended a Mission school in Quetta with his sister Kausar until class 5, then spent three years at Islamia High School Quetta before they both enrolled at St. Francis' Grammar School. As a teenager, he was inspired by Muhammad Ali Jinnah, the founder of Pakistan, whom he once saw sitting just six feet away during a visit to his former school, igniting his ambition to defend Pakistan. Moreover, the sight of Polish pilots engaging in dogfights over Quetta during World War II further fueled his aspirations—he was mesmerised by their skill in Spitfires and vowed to become a fighter pilot himself, though his father dismissed it with laughter. Haider later wrote, "I was the first to become a fighter pilot from Balochistan."

Initially, his family resided in the Bugti House before moving to a small tin-roofed home within a complex of eight homes constructed by the father of Akbar Bugti, Nawab Mehran Khan Bugti. A close friend of his father, Mehran Khan gifted him two of the homes. Following this transition, Haider grew up close to Akbar Bugti and other Bugti siblings. He recalled Akbar Bugti being a "stunning and fearsome person," who always referred to him as chapeit or "scrawny boy". Akbar's younger brother, Ahmed Nawaz Bugti, would bring Haider with him every day to learn how to drive.

Against the backdrop of the post-World War II depression, Haider's family confronted challenging times, as his father did not charge people for treatment, which led the family to rely on ration cards to obtain essential goods such as sugar, flour, tea, eggs, cooking oil, and petrol. Despite the challenging economic situation, he stated that the harsh realities of war did not directly impact his childhood, thanks to his mother's significant sacrifices to ensure warmth and sustenance. After passing the Senior Cambridge exam, Haider joined the Forman Christian College in 1950.

== Ancestry ==
Haider claimed descent from the rulers of the Khwarazmian Empire; he said that his father, Dr. Syed Fazal Shah, was from Moinuddinpur, a small village in Gujrat founded by their ancestor, Sayed Moin-ud-Din Shah.

Dr. Syed Fazal Shah was a wartime doctor in World War I and spent most of that time stationed in Rouen, France. On the invitation of his close friend and sworn brother, Nawab Mehrab Khan Bugti—father of Akbar Bugti—as well as Jafar Khan Jamali, Dr. Syed Fazal Shah opened his medical practice in Quetta after the war. He was also an associate of Muhammad Ali Jinnah and was one of the founding members of the All India Muslim League (AIML), laying its foundations in Balochistan and Sindh.

During a meeting, Jinnah once asked him, "Why didn't you become President of the Muslim League in Balochistan yourself? Why did you allow Qazi Muhammad Isa to take the position?" Fazal Shah replied, "I am not interested in power but in the results of the prime mission. Furthermore, Qazi Muhammad Isa is a local of Balochistan, while I am an outsider."

Devoted to his medical profession, Syed Fazal Shah provided care to underprivileged patients, often charging nominal or no fees. He responded to emergency calls without hesitation, even in Quetta's freezing temperatures. His dedication took him to remote areas, including Rojahan Jamali, and he attended to patients such as the wife of Nawab Mehrab Khan Bugti. Haider recalled that his father never turned away a patient over unpaid dues, enduring irregular hours, long distances, and diverse modes of travel—from horse-drawn carts to jeeps, and at times, even on horseback.

== Personal life and death ==
He had an older sister named Kausar and two younger brothers, Bunyad Haider (1936–2014), a renowned cardiologist who served as the Chairperson of the University of Medicine and Dentistry of New Jersey and the youngest, Jawwad Haider.

Haider married three times. In 1960, he married his first wife, Iffat, who gave birth to their son Adnan in 1963. He married his second wife, Tahira, in 1970, and the marriage lasted until 1971. He married his last wife, Faryda, in April 1979, who gave birth to their son Zohare in 1980 and daughter Zaiena in 1984.

Haider died on 3 January 2025, at the age of 92 and was laid to rest the next day at his Los Colinas Farmhouse in Bara Koh, Islamabad.

== Service years ==
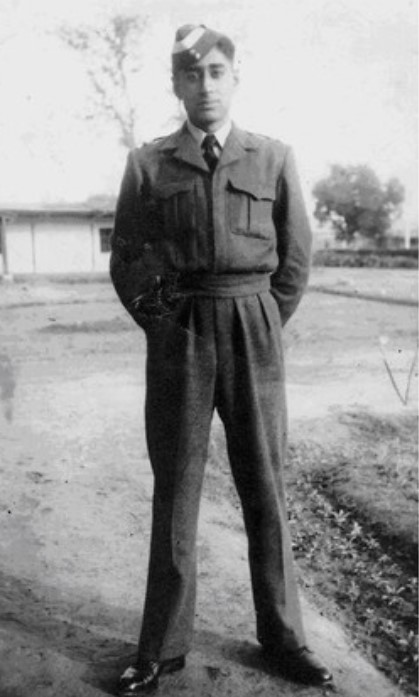
Flight Cadet Sajjad Haider at the RPAF College, 1951

During his second year at the FC College, he was selected to join the 13th GD(P) Course at the RPAF College in December 1951. He later reflected on being an average student who barely scraped through the 1½ year course. However, shortly after earning his pilot wings, he rose to the top of his course within months, despite starting in the middle during training and was commissioned into the Royal Pakistan Air Force on 11 June 1953.

=== Airstrikes against Faqir of Ipi ===
In 1953–54, Haider participated in air raids against Faqir of Ipi and his men. In an interview in 2004, he recalled: "We were called in to rescue ground troops. Flying overhead, we saw hundreds of tribal fighters, in groups of 10 and 15, hiding behind big boulders. They knew the terrain, they moved very quickly, and they understood the limitations of our aircraft. They used to hide at the bottom of steep hills so pilots would have no space to pull up after attacks."

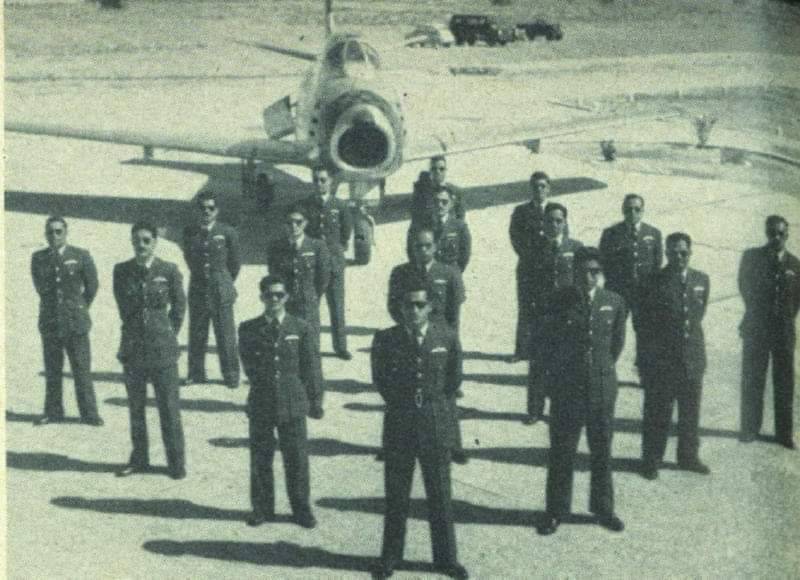
Mitty Masud (center), Sajjad Haider (right) with other members of the PAF Falcons who set the World record loop (1958)

King Zahir Shah arrives at Mauripur with President Iskandar Mirza and Nahid Mirza, welcomed by Asghar Khan and Air Commodore Nur Khan. The loop is showcased towards the end of the video with Haider at the third position in the formation (1958)

=== World record loop of 1958 ===
On 2 February 1958, hundreds of thousands of people were in attendance at an air show in Mauripur organised in honour of the visiting guest King of Afghanistan Mohammad Zahir Shah. Flying in the No. 3 position, Flight Lieutenant Haider was part of the Falcons aerobatic team led by Wing Commander Mitty Masud which set a world record by performing a 16-aircraft diamond loop in F-86 Sabres.

The same year, Haider was the youngest and first to receive the Golden Eagle Award after the Partition of British India, for being an exceptional fighter pilot.

=== War of 1965 ===
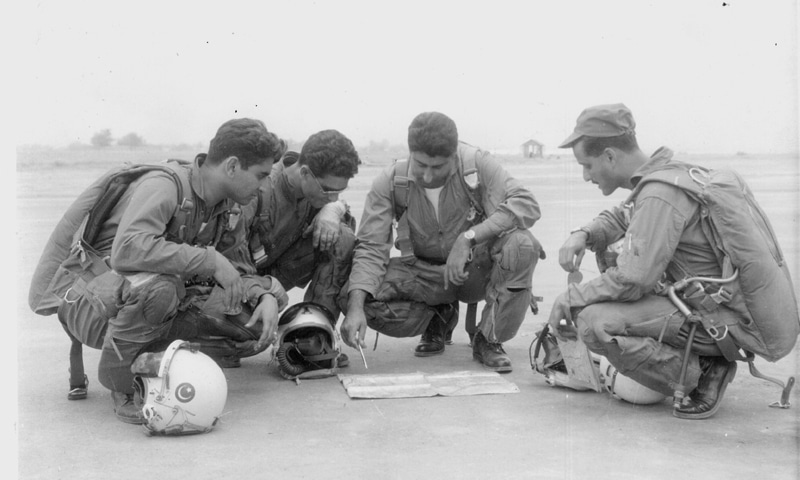
Officer commanding No. 19 Sqn Sajjad Haider (middle) planning airstrikes on Pathankot with his fighter pilots (1965)

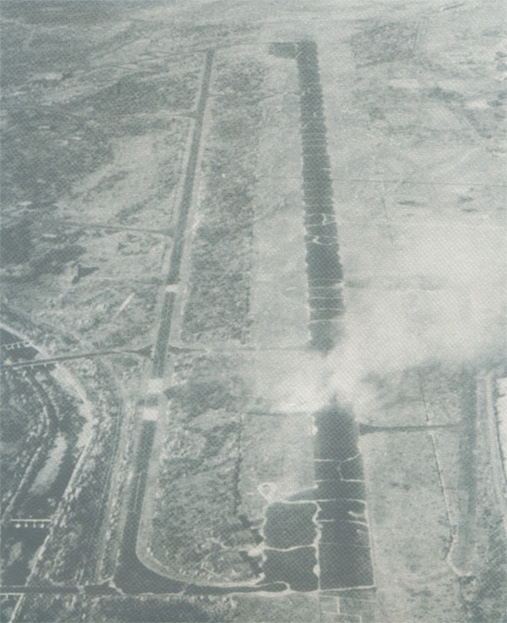
Smoke rises from India's Pathankot airbase following airstrikes by No. 19 Sqn led by Haider.

Air Marshal Nur Khan praises his predecessor Air Marshal Asghar Khan for the PAF's success during the 1965 war, while Squadron Leader Haider is seen giving a presentation to pilots

Sajjad Haider is often lauded as the Saviour of Lahore and one of the key heroes of the 1965 War, for his role in leading the Sherdils of No. 19 Sqn as Squadron Leader.

The strike on Pathankot was a mission that underscored Haider's strategic acumen and the unwavering resolve of his squadron. The PAF played an integral role in hindering the Indian land forces' advance, particularly in the Wagah sector. Despite the historical significance of these events, he noted that they are often overlooked in war narratives.

Before they took off from Peshawar, Haider had arranged for towels drenched in buckets of eau de cologne and said to his men: "Boys, we don't know who will be the unlucky ones who won't be able to dodge the enemy Ack-ack. They would surely arrive in the reception hall up there (Heaven) at around 1715 Hrs; but let us be sure we all smell good for the promised houris and angels who will receive us at the gates leading to heaven, for fighting as Allah has commanded us."

They targeted the IAF airfield with aircraft guns only and the success of the mission resulted in the destruction of numerous Indian aircraft. According to him, this showcased the exceptional skill and determination of the PAF pilots and was acknowledged by the Indians. He attributed the success to the collective efforts of his team and underscored the leadership and the visionary strategies of Air Marshal Asghar Khan and Air Marshal Nur Khan.

The following day, Squadron Leader Haider was summoned by his base commander who provided a letter that contained Instruction Orders, directing No. 19 Sqn to conduct a reconnoitre at Avantipura airfield, Strafe any targets, and then go to Srinagar to hit any parked aircraft. Flight Commander "Mo" Akbar, was directed to put three pilots for the mission together. The team consisted of Arshad Sami Khan, Rao Akhtar, and Khalid Latif. A Hi-Lo-Hi profile was worked out to avoid radar detection by climbing to 20,000 ft near Nanga Parbat. As they descended over the Khel village, they entered the Kashmir valley. Approaching Srinagar, they observed the target at Avantipura, and then turned towards Srinagar airfield. As they approached, Flt. Lt. Rao Akhtar saw a civilian helicopter that was brightly painted and asked permission from Haider to engage it. He responded, "No leave it alone, it's a civilian helicopter." Afterwards, it was reported that this helicopter was carrying Ghulam Mohammed Sadiq, the Chief minister of Jammu and Kashmir. As Haider pulled up, heavy anti-aircraft fire started and he engaged by conducting a strafing attack, destroying a C-7 Caribou and two C-47 Dakotas. Once the attack was over the formation regrouped and returned to home base. During the course of this attack, the Indian Air Force said that they had shot down two F-86 Sabres and captured Squadron Leader Haider, claims which were proven false.

==== Sitara-e-Jurat ====
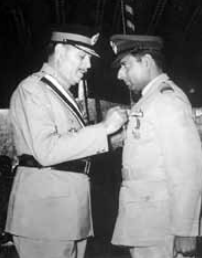
Field Marshal Ayub Khan pins the Sitara-e-Jurat on Haider (1965)

His Sitara-e-Jurat citation reads:

CITATION
SQUADRON LEADER SYED SAJJAD HAIDER (PAK/1445)

"Squadron Leader Syed Sajjad Haider displayed exceptional leadership, courage and flying skill in the operations against the enemy during the Indo-Pak War. He destroyed four enemy aircraft, eleven enemy tanks and damaged three tanks. Throughout the operations, his attitude both on the ground and in the air was exemplary. He infused his pilots with aggressiveness. The strike mission which he led on 6th September 1965, against Pathankot airfield, where his formation destroyed 13 enemy aircraft including two MIG-21's, was conducted in the best traditions of the Pakistan Air Force. The formation carried out repeated attacks in the face of heavy ack-ack. For the determination, courage and exceptional flying skill with which he flew and led his squadron during operations against the enemy. Squadron Leader Syed Sajjad Haider, is awarded SJ."

=== War of 1971 ===
After serving as Commander No. 14 Sqn (stationed at PAF Base Dacca) from April 1969 to November 1970, Haider was nominated for the Joint Service Defence College in the United Kingdom. On his return in September 1971, he took command of the No 33 Wing at Sargodha. As tensions between India and Pakistan heightened, he faced the challenge of preparing the Wing for any impending threat.

The Wing under his leadership, included No. 5 Sqn of Mirages, No. 25 Sqn with Sabres, No. 23 Sqn with newly inducted Chinese F-6 and No. 11 Sqn with F-104s. Haider drawing on his experience from the 1965 War, swiftly readied the Wing for a potential conflict. One of his initial actions was to convert to the newly inducted French Mirages, which he flew a couple of missions on and became operational in no time. As he settled into his role, the 1971 War broke out.

He led the Wing in notable contributions, with No. 5 Sqn conducting successful strike missions in India on Amritsar, Pathankot, and the famous strike on Mukerian railway station. He wrote that he personally flew various missions on Mirages, F-86s, and F-6s, often undertaking two missions a day despite heavy office commitments.

The Wing played a crucial role in close support operations, conducting nearly 200 missions in the Zafarwal-Chawinda sector and also destroyed a significant fuel dump at Akhnoor on 10 December. From 12 to 15 December, the Wing flew 50 to 60 missions daily. In battles against Indian armor, the Wing, particularly the F-6 Squadron, inflicted substantial damage, contributing significantly to stalling the Indian assault on the Sialkot sector. Under Haider's command, the Wing excelled in air combat with young pilots achieving kills against superior IAF aircraft.

=== Attock Conspiracy 1973 ===
On 30 March 1973, several Pakistan Army and Pakistan Air Force officers, including Group Captain Haider, were arrested for their alleged role in what was to be known as the 1973 Attock Conspiracy Case on charges of attempting to overthrow the Government of Zulfikar Ali Bhutto. He was placed in solitary confinement, in a dark room for months in which he recalled that he developed a stronger relationship with Allah.

He was offered a deal to get out early by two officials of the Air Intelligence, CA Waheed and Sibtain, who he referred to as Gestapo rats, in exchange for a false confessional statement against Zulfiqar Ali Khan in front of a magistrate, which Haider refused to do.

The 14 air force officials were tried at PAF Camp Badaber on 27 July 1973 in a General Court Martial headed by Air Vice Marshal Chaudhry Rab Nawaz where Haider and others were exonerated. The court members also observed that the case against Group Captains Sajjad Haider and Sattar Chaudhry was merely a personal vendetta driven by the sitting Chief of Air Staff Zafar Chaudhry.

The Verdict read:

VERDICT

"THE MEMBERS OF THE COURT HAVE DELIBERATED VERY CAREFULLY THE EVIDENCE PRODUCED BY THE PROSECUTION THROUGHOUT THE TRIAL AND TODAY AS RESPONSE TO THE 'PLEA OF NO CASE' BY THE LEGAL COUNSEL OF ACCUSED NO 13, THE COURT FINDS THE PROSECUTOR'S CASE AGAINST THE ACCUSED INDEFENSIBLE. IT IS THE UNANIMOUS DECISION OF THE COURT THAT THE 'PLEA OF NO CASE' IS ACCEPTED AND ACCUSED NO 13, GROUP CAPTAIN SAJAD HAIDER SAYED, STANDS EXONERATED AGAINST ALL CHARGES LEVELED AGAINST HIM. HE IS FREE TO LEAVE THE COURT ROOM."

=== Air Attaché ===
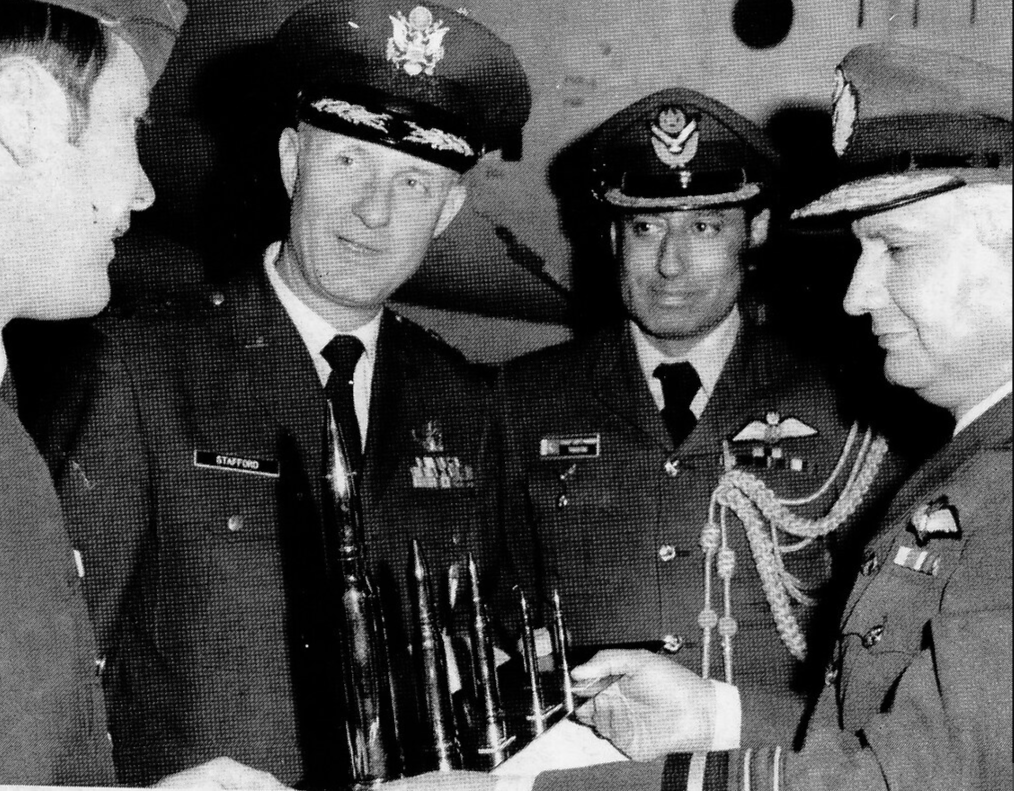
Thomas P. Stafford, Haider, and Zulfiqar Ali Khan at Edwards AFB, 1974-1975

By the end of September 1974, he relinquished the charge of Director Flight Safety and was appointed as Air Attaché to the Embassy of Pakistan, Washington, D.C. and High Commission of Pakistan, Ottawa, succeeding Eric G. Hall.

Group Captain Haider was part of the greeting committee which welcomed Prime Minister Zulfikar Ali Bhutto on his visit to Washington, D.C. on 4 February 1975. They met Bhutto at Andrews AFB and proceeded to the President's Guest House before attending a private dinner at the residence of Sahabzada Yaqub Khan, the Pakistani Ambassador to the United States.

==== Accused of Insulting The Shah of Iran ====
In 1974, the Vice President of a major Fortune 400 company approached Haider to request his Swiss bank account number. He quickly declined the unethical offer and asked the American to leave and stated, "Get out of my office, I'll have your company blacklisted." His strong response led to the company's president visiting Haider's office. He apologised for the Vice President's action and said that he would be dismissed for attempted bribery.

After his dismissal from the company, the disgraced Vice President schemed with others, including Pakistanis, Iranians, and Americans seeking to profit from questionable defence transactions with the Pakistan Air Force. The matter accelerated for Haider when, during an early lunch, he was summoned to the embassy by the secretary of Ambassador Sahabzada Yaqub Khan. Haider found Khan visibly distressed as he handed him a classified telex from the Pakistani Minister of State for Foreign Affairs, Aziz Ahmed, accusing Haider of making derogatory comments about the Shah of Iran. Khan informed him that the Shah had personally complained to Prime Minister Zulfikar Ali Bhutto, while in İzmir, that Haider should be dismissed and court-martialed.

The Shah's son-in-law Ardeshir Zahedi who was serving as the Iranian ambassador in Washington, was shocked by the turn of events, as he is a close friend of Haider.

TELEX

"DURING THE FIRST RCD MEETING AT IZMIR BETWEEN THE ARYAMEHR SHAHINSHAH OF IRAN AND MR BHUTTO, THE SHAHINSHAH DISCUSSED IN DETAIL THE PAKISTAN AIR ATTACHÉ AT WASHINGTON, GP CAPT SAJAD HAIDER. THE SHAHINSHAH TOOK STRONG EXCEPTION TO THE DEROGATORY COMMENTS MADE BY THE AIR ATTACHÉ AGAINST ARYAMEHR SHAHINSHAH OF IRAN'S PERSON AND FURTHER ALLEGED HE HAS BEEN SPREADING DISCONTENT AMONGST THE IRANIAN COMMUNITY. THE SHAHINSHAH WANTED IMMEDIATE ACTION AGAINST THE AIR ATTACHÉ. CONSIDERING THE SENSITIVE RELATIONS BETWEEN IRAN AND PAKISTAN YOU ARE TO REPATRIATE THE AIR ATTACHÉ INSTANTLY."

In the midst of the turmoil, Haider faced a surprising reassignment by the Ambassador, leaving him disheartened. However, a letter from Foreign Secretary Agha Shahi, eventually conveyed his exoneration. Despite this, strained relations persisted, leading to Haider's recall from Washington.

Ambassador Abdur Rahim Khan, upon learning of Haider's financial constraints, arranged for his travel to Spain, where he was serving. Haider wrote that this act of generosity became pivotal as it provided him with the means to meet Khan and seek solace during a challenging period. During their meeting, He later wrote that tears streamed down Khan's face as he listened to his account of his service and the court-martial.

Subsequently, an investigation revealed that an operative of the SAVAK from Zahedi's embassy, with a direct line to the Shah, fabricated the lie against Haider. A letter written by Ambassador Sahabzada Yaqub Khan to Air Vice Marshal M. Mahmood Hasan, the Vice Chief of Air Staff, cleared Haider of any wrongdoing. The letter uncovered that the false accusations originated from the American executive, in retaliation for Haider rejecting the bribe. According to Haider, Hasan had allegedly not shown the letter to Chief of Air Staff Zulfiqar Ali Khan. As a result, he faced challenges on his return to Pakistan, including an unexpected reassignment by the Chief of Air Staff. Frustrated by the lack of communication and understanding, he confronted the Chief and questioned the return of individuals involved in previous scandals into the PAF. In a final encounter with Prime Minister Zulfikar Ali Bhutto, he acknowledged the harsh realities of the political landscape and empathized with Haider's court-martial hardships. Recalling the incident, he wrote that Bhutto's words, "This is a cruel world, Haider," foreshadowed his own destiny as Bhutto would later be executed by General Zia-ul-Haq.

=== Director of Joint Warfare ===
After graduating from the National Defence College, Islamabad in 1977, he was appointed Director of Joint Warfare at the General Headquarters. In 1978, he attended the Quaid-i-Azam University and earned his Master of Science degree in Anthropology.

Sajad Haider recollected that in 1980, he was called by Lt Gen F. S. Lodhi, the Chief of General Staff (CGS), who informed him that Vice Chief of Army Staff General Sawar Khan had recommended him for the Sitara-e-Imtiaz in recognition of his contributions to joint warfare concepts. This was the first time an air force officer had been recommended by the army high command to the air chief. Lodhi mentioned that the recommendation had been sent to Air Headquarters and Haider would likely hear about the award soon, with it appearing on the Pakistan Day awards list. The top generals of the army had endorsed him (Appendix 'I'). However, Air Commodore Saleem, the brother-in-law of General Zia-ul-Haq, did not present the army high command's recommendation to the Air Chief and it was subsequently suppressed.

==== Dissent against Zia's dictatorship ====
As President General Zia-ul-Haq outlined his continued military rule at a top-secret meeting at the General Headquarters in November 1979, recalling the incident, Haider wrote that a sense of rebellion stirred within him, as he had been harboring concerns about the prevailing situation in the country.

While Zia sat down after his closing remarks, Haider stood up and felt a tug at his trousers from Lieut. General F. S. Lodhi, urging him to remain silent. He says he was fully aware that expressing his dissent could have severe consequences. Gathering his courage, Haider stood up and addressed the President directly. General Zia-ul-Haq, irritated by the interruption, granted him a brief moment to speak. In that instance, he voiced his concerns about the intelligence agencies, the stifled press, and the intimidation faced by ordinary citizens. He painted a stark picture of the disconnect between the rulers and the nation.

In front of the entire gathering, Haider stated:

Mr. President, Pakistanis seem to live in a constant state of foreboding and terror of the intelligence agencies. These intelligence agencies have never told the truth, as it is not in their culture to do so, nor are they telling the truth to you about the state of the hearts and minds of the nation. Are these hearts beating for Pakistan or from the fear of getting lashed in public or thrown in dirty cells with convicts on the mere suspicion of being dissenters? These agencies have carefully crafted the fall of every government. What is to stop them from doing the same to your government?

Sir, the road from the airport to the Aiwan-e-Sadr does not reflect the soul of Pakistan; which, in fact, lurks in the dark and pitted backstreets of Pakistan. But these agencies would not suggest that you take a peek there and see the real state of the wretched Pakistani nation. The press, Mr. President, is stifled, and people are petrified to speak their distressed minds.

I have worn this uniform with incredible pride and never hesitated to put my life on the line for the defence of my country. Tragically, I do not feel the same sense of pride as I did a decade ago when people almost kissed our hands when they saw us in uniform in a public place. Today, the tables have turned. People have visible contempt for us and our uniform. Since, in some small way, I share the responsibility of this metamorphosis, I do not feel proud wearing this uniform anymore.

Mr. President, I live in Islamabad, and every day my exit from GHQ brings me on an intercept course with the Corps Commander also going home. But there is a difference. The gallant men of God, who are under oath to defend the people, the property, and the frontiers of this country, travel with outriders on motorcycles; red beacons flashing and sirens screaming to herald the approaching cavalcade. In the meanwhile, all citizens on foot or in transports at the T-junction from GHQ to the old President House are shooed off the road to clear the path for the defenders of Pakistan. This is not the way defenders should conduct themselves amongst their own people. I think that we have ceased to sense their ire that ordinary citizens feel at such intimidation."

=== Retirement ===
Following the incident, several military colleagues visited Haider, cautioning him about impending trouble and a grim future. While he was in service, he had the opportunity to take a job in the Pakistan International Airlines, which he wrote "seemed like history" after the confrontation with Zia.

Chief of General Staff Mian Afzaal expressed disappointment, asserting that Haider had jeopardised a promising career in the air force. Unfazed, Haider affirmed his readiness to challenge tyranny for principles. Growing disillusionment with Zia's rule and absolute power led him to break free from the air force obsession, anticipating a new chapter outside.

Encountering Air Chief Marshal Anwar Shamim at the Islamabad Club, Haider declined his offer to command PAF Base Masroor, citing unease after confronting Zia-ul-Haq. Writing that he felt confident in his ability to navigate an uncertain future, Haider stated he emphasised reliance on destiny and faith in Allah. Shamim acknowledged Haider's resilience, foreseeing a path to ascend or exit. Choosing to exit, he left the PAF in May 1980. Haider later noted that he had no regrets, envisioning a space for the younger generation and gratefully declined facilities given to retired personnel, embarking on a new life with Rs. 17,000 (equivalent to Rs. 87,000 or US$310 in 2021) in his bank account and a 1970 Left-hand Drive Toyota.

== Later life ==
=== Scrutinizing M.M. Alam's Air Combat Record ===
According to the Pakistan Air Force, Squadron Leader MM Alam shot down five Indian Hawker Hunter aircraft in under a minute during a single sortie in the Indo-Pakistani air war of 1965, achieving "ace in a day" status in record time. He reportedly downed a total of seven Hunters, though two were considered 'probable' kills. However, the Indian Air Force disputed the loss of five Hunters on 7 September. Recalling his final four claimed kills, Alam stated that after executing a "270-degree turn at around 12 degrees per second... four Hunters had been shot down."

Assessing the widely publicised claims of MM Alam in shooting down five Hawker Hunters in under 30 seconds on 7 September, his former colleague Sajad Haider called the claims into question. In his 2009 memoir, Haider wrote that it was "tactically and mathematically very difficult to resurrect the incident in which all 5 Hunters in a hard turn were claimed to have been shot down in a 270 degree turn in 23 seconds". He highlighted that both, The Story of the Pakistan Air Force and historian John Fricker, admit the difficulty of verifying the event, especially since only two wrecked aircraft were found near Sangla Hill. The aircraft were piloted by Squadron Leader Sureshchandra Bhaksar Bhagwat and Flying Officer Jagdev Singh Brar, who were burnt beyond recognition. Indian aviation historian Pushpindar Singh Chopra and F-86 Sabre enthusiast Duncan Curtis agree with this account and credit Alam with these kills. Similarly, Haider referred to Alam as the "undisputed ace of PAF". The fact that no verifiable gun camera footage of all his kills was ever made public by the Pakistani authorities further casts doubt on Alam's claim.

=== Reviewing Cecil Chaudhry's Claimed Aviation Feats ===
In 2020, appearing as a guest in a podcast hosted by military historian (Retd) Major Agha H Amin, Sajad Haider revealed that Kaiser Tufail falsely told the Indian Air Force to credit Cecil Chaudhry instead of Yunus Hussain for shooting down Indian pilot A.R. Gandhi's Hawker Hunter during the Indo-Pakistani air war of 1965. (Note: The specified timestamps for reference are 16:25-18:10, 20:26-21:07, and 29:00-31:17 in the podcast.) Haider's Indian counterpart confirmed that Yunus had originally been credited before Tufail approached him. When Haider questioned Tufail on the lie, he said he wanted Cecil to be credited because Cecil was his senior. Haider also added that Cecil had been lying his whole life and claiming Yunus' success for his own for 40 years. He further stated that the lie was concocted in order to glorify Sargodha pilots.

=== Political views ===
Writing for Dawn in 2009, he wrote that the Americans coerced President Ayub Khan to let them establish a spy base at Badaber in Peshawar where Lockheed U-2 fighter planes operated from. This to Haider was the beginning of Pakistanis taking American dictation, "We traded our sovereignty for preservation of a dictator (Note: i.e. Field Marshal Ayub Khan) and we've never looked back. The Americans have always let down Pakistan," he said. He further added that he was very close friends with Zulfikar Ali Bhutto but would never forgive him for his role in the separation of East Pakistan.

=== Reaction to Abbottabad Raid ===
Reacting to the news, Haider stated that it was impossible for the Pakistan Armed Forces to be unaware of American jets entering Pakistan to conduct the raid on Osama bin Laden. He referred to the Government of Pakistan as cowards for letting the sovereignty of Pakistan be violated, stating that this selling of sovereignty was first done by Ayub Khan who didn't allow Air Marshal Asghar Khan to shoot down Indian Air Force jets in fear of a war arising between the two countries.

=== Defence Analyst ===
In 2019, Haider was one of 26 former Pakistani military officers who were allowed by the Inter-Services Public Relations to appear as defence analysts on Pakistani television.

=== 2023 Islamabad Police incident ===
In 2023, he was holding a placard in support of Imran Khan when Islamabad Police approached him and asked him to vacate the spot where he was standing, an incident that Indian news website ThePrint described as the manhandling of Haider. Describing the incident, some social media users referred to his role during the India–Pakistan war of 1965 as "Saviour of Lahore & Pakistan".

== Publications ==
- Wing Commander Syed Sajjad Haider, S.J. (1969). "The Story Behind the Tank Busters". Illustrated Weekly of Pakistan: Volume 21, Issues 40-52. Pakistan Herald Publications.
- Haider, S Sajad (2009). FLIGHT OF THE FALCON: Demolishing myths of Indo-Pak wars 1965 & 1971 - Story of a Fighter Pilot. Vanguard Publications. ISBN 9789694025261.
- Haider, S Sajad (2 July 2009). "Arshad Sami". The Nation (Pakistan).
- Air Commodore (Retd) S. Sajad Haider (6 September 2015). "Straight shooting on the 1965 war". Dawn.
- "Stories from Sajad Haider". The Express Tribune.
- 2009, Urdu: Shaheen ki Parwaz, Urdu translation of Flight of the Falcon by Huma Anwar. Vanguard Books

== Effective dates of promotion ==
| Insignia | Rank | Date |
|---|---|---|
| | Air Commodore | 24 March 1976 |
| | Group Captain | September 1971 |
| | Wing Commander | June 1967 |
| | Squadron Leader | October 1963 |
| | Flight Lieutenant | 1958 |
| | Flying Officer | October 1953 |
| | Pilot Officer | 13 June 1953 |

== Awards and decorations ==
- Top Gun Fighter Leaders' School Sword; (Instructor and Flight Commander)
- Golden Eagle Award (1958) (Note: Haider was the youngest and first person to receive this award after the Partition of British India, given for being an exceptional fighter pilot.)
- Caterpillar Club (1961)
- Sitara-e-Jurat (1965)
- (6) Green Endorsements (Note: Awarded by the Commander-in-Chief/Chief of Air Staff for flying every 500 accident-free hours.)

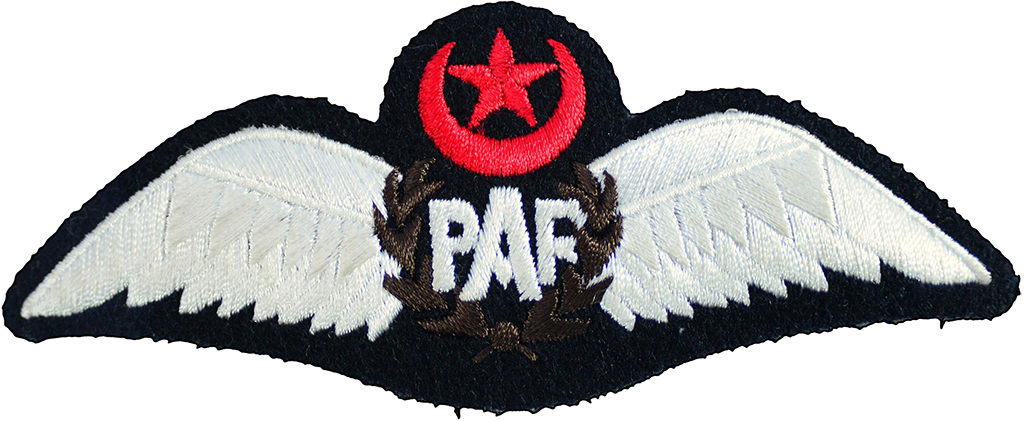

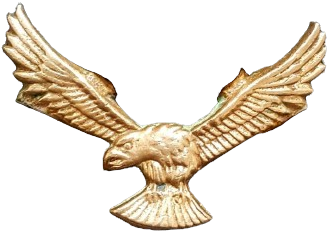

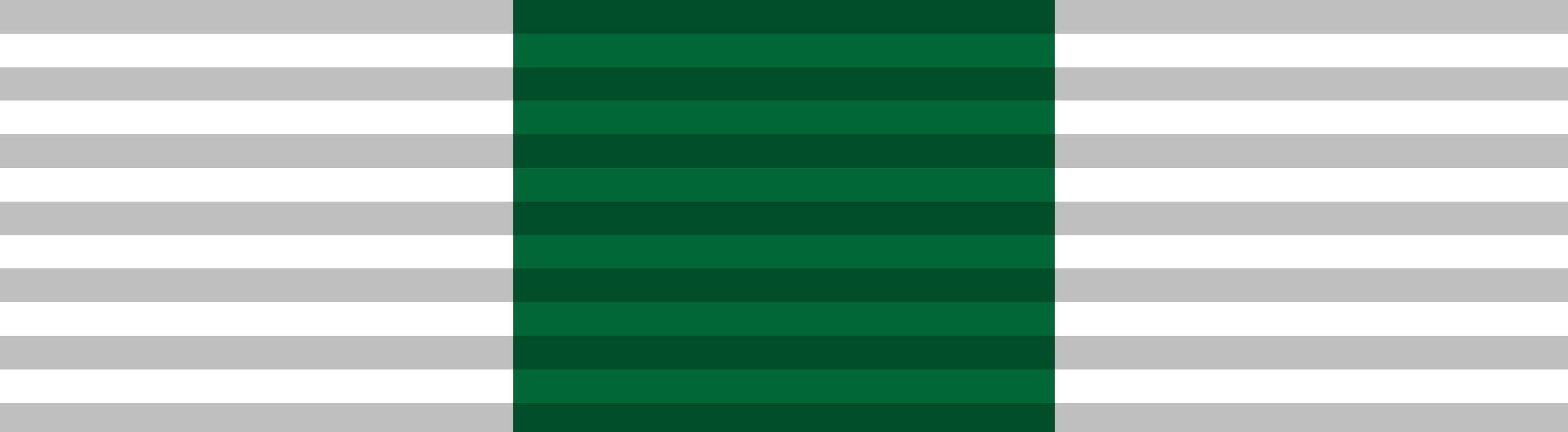

PAF GD(P) Badge RED (More than 3000 Flying Hours) (Note: In total, Haider had more than 4000 flying hours.)
Golden Eagle Award (Pakistan) (Exceptional Fighter Pilot) (Youngest and the first post-partition to be awarded); 1958
Sitara-e-Jurat (Star of Courage) 1965 War
| Tamgha-e-Qayam-e-Jamhuria (Republic Commemoration Medal) 1956 | Tamgha-e-Diffa (Defence Medal): 1. 1965 War Clasp; 2. 1971 War Clasp | Sitara-e-Harb 1965 War (War Star 1965) | | Sitara-e-Harb 1971 War (War Star 1971) |
| Tamgha-e-Jang 1965 War (War Medal 1965) | | Tamgha-e-Jang 1971 War (War Medal 1971) | Tamgha-e-Sad Saala Jashan-e-Wiladat-e-Quaid-e-Azam (100th Birth Anniversary of Muhammad Ali Jinnah) 1976 | Hijri Tamgha (Hijri Medal) 1979 |
