= Alauddin Ahmed =

Pakistan Air Force officer (1930–1965)

Squadron Leader Alauddin Ahmed SJ
- আলাউদ্দীন আহমেদ
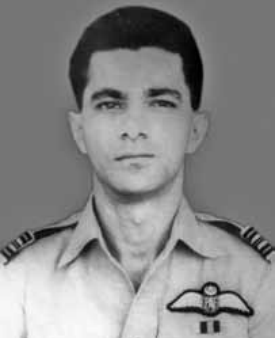
- Official military portrait, 1962

Officer Commanding No. 18 Squadron PAF
- In office June 1962 – 13 September 1965

Personal details
- Born: 3 October 1930 Purana Paltan, Dacca, British India
- Died: 13 September 1965 (aged 34) Gurdaspur, Punjab, India
- Spouse: Sofia Shireen (m. 1955)
- Children: 4
- Education: RPAF College; German Air Force Officer Training School; 157th FIS, South Carolina; Fighter Leaders' School, Mauripur
- Awards: See list
- Nickname(s): Butch; Butch Ahmed

Military service
- Branch/service: Pakistan Air Force
- Years of service: 1952–1965
- Rank: Squadron Leader
- Unit: No. 11 Squadron PAF
- Battles/wars: Indo-Pakistani War of 1965; Indo-Pakistani Air War of 1965
- Service number: PAK/5034

Squadron Leader Alauddin Ahmed (Note: Bengali: আলাউদ্দীন আহমেদ) (3 October 1930 — 13 September 1965), known as Butch or Butch Ahmed to his colleagues, was a Pakistan Air Force officer who led his squadron, the No. 18 Sharp Shooters in several missions during the Indo-Pakistani War of 1965, attacking Indian ground and air forces, and was killed in action while attacking an ammunition train at Gurdaspur in complete disregard to his personal safety.

In his book "Flight of the Falcon," his colleague (Retd) Air Commodore Sajad Haider, who was the last person to speak with Butch over the radio before his crash, wrote: "Butch truly never had an enemy; everybody loved Butch, especially the girls from the Burt Institute (an Anglo-Indian club operated by the Railways)."

== Early life ==
Alauddin Ahmed was born in Dacca on 3 October 1930 into a Bengali family originally from Calcutta. His father, Dr. Tajamal Ahmed was a well known eye specialist in East Pakistan and throughout the Indian subcontinent. He was awarded the Sitara-i-Imtiaz, Tamgha-e-Imtiaz, and Kaisar-i-Hind Medal in recognition of his services.

Alauddin received his early education in Dacca and was noted as doing his Faculty of Sciences (FSc) with "flying colours". He was known as an outstanding boxer during his college days and won various medals at district and provincial levels.

== Personal life ==
Alauddin married Sofia Shireen in a wedding ceremony on 3 November 1955. They had four children, two sons Zafar and Jamal, and two daughters Yasmeen and Neelofar.

== Service years ==
Ahmed enrolled in the 10th GD(P) course at the RPAF College in 1951 and was commissioned into the Royal Pakistan Air Force (RPAF) on 13 June 1952. Graduating at the top of his class, he was awarded the Sword of Honour.

In 1956, he was among several RPAF officers including Sajad Haider and FS Hussain, who were selected for a Jet Transition Course at the German Air Force Officer Training School. Ahmed later attended an advanced F-86 Sabre course in the United States.

Upon returning to Pakistan, Ahmed was posted to the No. 11 Sqn which had recently inducted Sabres. Sometime later, he graduated from the Fighter Leaders' School at PAF Station Mauripur with distinction and became an instructor there.

King Zahir Shah arrives at Mauripur with President Iskandar Mirza and Nahid Mirza, greeted by Air Marshal Asghar Khan and Air Commodore Nur Khan. The loop is showcased towards the end of the video with Ahmed at the second position in the formation, 1958

On 2 February 1958, hundreds of thousands of people were in attendance at an air show in Mauripur organised in honour of the visiting guest King of Afghanistan Mohammad Zahir Shah. Others included, President Iskandar Ali Mirza, General Ayub Khan, Air Vice Marshal Asghar Khan, Air Commodore Nur Khan, Turkish Air Chief Suphi Göker, Iraqi Air Force Chief Abdul Kadhim Abaddi and Chief of the Imperial Iranian Air Force Hedayatollah Gilanshah.

Flying in the No. 2 position, Flight Lieutenant Alauddin Ahmed was part of the Falcons aerobatic team led by Wing Commander Mitty Masud that set a world record performing a 16-aircraft diamond loop in F-86 Sabres.

Squadron Leader Alauddin Ahmed was appointed as Officer Commanding No. 18 Sqn in June 1962. Under his leadership, the squadron flew numerous combat missions, achieving significant success against Indian ground and air forces during the 1965 War.

On 6 September 1965, during an offensive fighter sweep near Taran Taran, a town in India's Amritsar district, Squadron Leader Ahmed led a formation of three Sabre jets. As they approached, he spotted four Indian Hawker Hunter aircraft and immediately informed his commander, Squadron Leader Alam, of the threat. Following Alam's orders, the squadron jettisoned their fuel tanks and prepared for combat. In the ensuing battle, Ahmed's Sabre shot down one of the Hunters, marking his first aerial victory of the war. All four Hunters were eventually destroyed, leaving the three Sabres victorious in the skies.

=== Gurdaspur train attack ===
Squadron Leader Ahmed's final mission took place on 13 September 1965. In the morning, he led a successful attack on enemy tanks and artillery in the Chawinda-Narowal sector, as part of a support mission for Pakistani ground forces. After completing this sortie, he and his squadron returned to base for a brief rest before flying their second operational mission of the day, an armed reconnaissance patrol over the Gurdaspur area.

As the squadron approached Gurdaspur, Ahmed spotted a train in the marshalling yard of the railway station. Upon closer inspection, he identified the train as carrying military supplies, including ammunition. Without hesitation, Ahmed led his formation in a daring attack. The initial assault caused a massive explosion, sending smoke and debris into the sky. Despite the danger posed by the explosion, Ahmed pressed the attack, flying dangerously low to target the remaining wagons. His final attack triggered another massive blast, sending pressure waves that buffeted the Sabres in flight.

During this last sortie, Ahmed's aircraft was struck by flying debris, causing severe damage. He attempted to fly the crippled aircraft back toward Pakistani territory, just 12 miles away, but his cockpit was soon filled with smoke. His last radio transmission was: "My cockpit is full of smoke." His comrades attempted to locate him after he was reported missing, but tragically, Squadron Leader Alauddin Ahmed was killed in action.

== Sitara-e-Jurat ==
His Sitara-e-Jurat citation reads:

CITATION
SQUADRON LEADER ALAUDDIN AHMED (PAK/5034)

Sqn Ldr Alauddin Ahmed led his Sqn in twenty combat missions against the Indian ground and air forces. His leadership throughout the operations was cool, courageous and most determined which inspired the greatest confidence amongst pilots of his formations and resulted in destruction of many Indian tanks and vehicles. In his last sortie, he attacked and blew up an important ammunition train at Gurdaspur railhead in complete disregard to his personal safety. During this attack on Sep 13, his aircraft was damaged and was reported missing over enemy territory. Subsequently, it was confirmed that the officer died in this action. For his exemplary leadership, courage, and valour, Sqn Ldr Alauddin Ahmed is awarded SJ.

== Awards and decorations ==
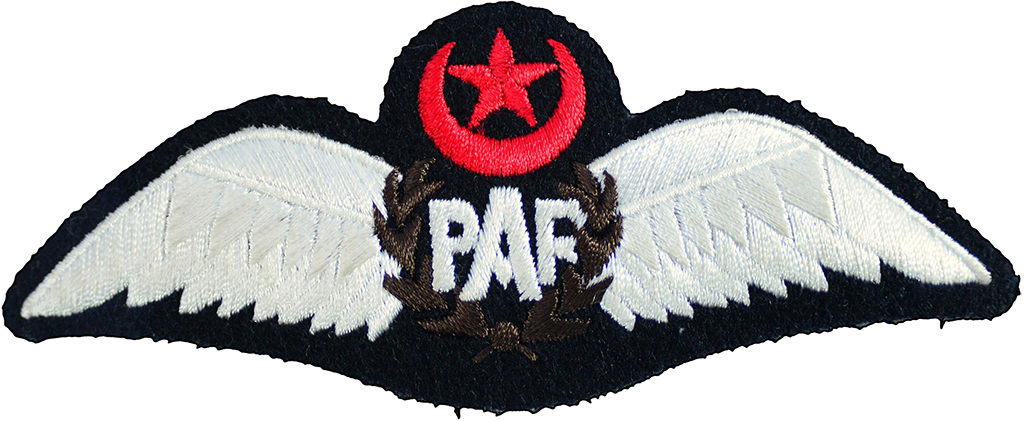

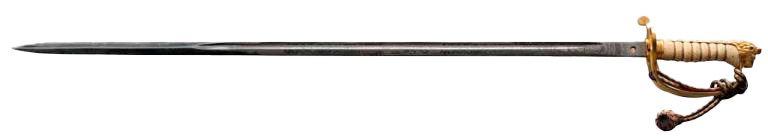

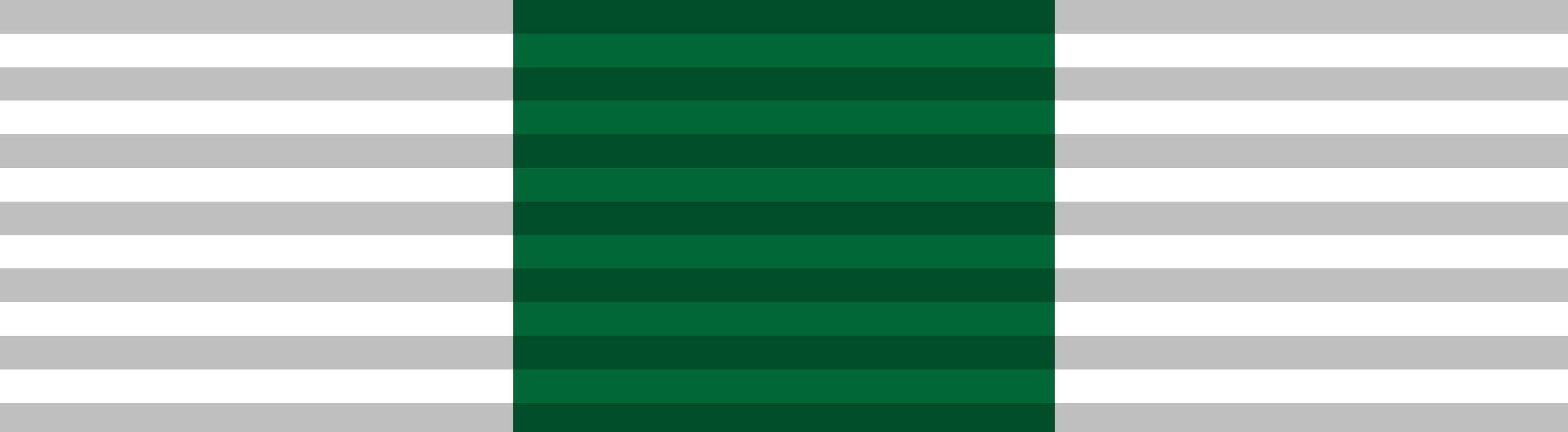

PAF GD(P) Badge RED (More than 3000 Flying Hours)
Sword of Honour (Pakistan); PAF Academy; 1952
| Sitara-e-Jurat (Star of Courage) (Posthumously); 1965 | Tamgha-e-Qayam-e-Jamhuria (Republic Commemoration Medal) 1956 |
