= Zafar Masud (air commodore) =

Pakistani fighter pilot (1927–2003)

Air Commodore Zafar Masud HJ SBt OI(J)
- Born: Muhammad Masud Zafar; 17 October 1927; Gujranwala, Punjab, India
- Died: 7 October 2003 (aged 75); PAF Hospital, Islamabad, Pakistan
- Burial place: PAF Cemetery, Nur Khan Air Force Base
- Spouse: Elizabeth Harniette
- Military career
- Allegiance: British India (1946-47); Pakistan (1947-71)
- Branch: Royal Indian Air Force; Pakistan Air Force
- Service years: 1946–1971
- Rank: Air-Commodore
- Nicknames: MZ Masud; Mitty
- Service number: 3314
- Unit: No. 9 Squadron Griffins
- Commands: PAF Base Dacca; PAF Base Sargodha; PAF Sherdils; No. 11 Squadron Arrows
- Conflicts: Indo-Pakistani War of 1965; Air war operations
- Awards: Hilal-e-Jurat; Sitara-e-Basalat; Order of Independence
- Other work: Flight instructor

Muhammad Zafar Masud HJ SBt OI(J) (Urdu: محمد مسعود ظفر ; 17 October 1927 – 7 October 2003), also known as Mitty Masud, was a one star air officer in the Pakistan Air Force and a military strategist who was known for his role as air officer commanding of the Dacca airbase in East Pakistan.

Masud had the area responsibility of defending the airspace border of East Pakistan, but resigned his commission after the military operation that took place on 26 March 1971, and left the command to Air Cdre Inamul Haq on 30 March 1971.

== Biography ==
=== Early life ===
Muhammad Masud Zafar was born in Gujranwala, Punjab, in British India (present-day Gujranwala, Punjab, Pakistan) to a prominent Punjabi family in 1927. His father, Zafar Hussain, was an alumnus of Punjab University and served as a civil officer in the Indian Railways. When his father was appointed as a senior officer of the Railway Board, the family moved to Delhi. In 1946, Masud graduated from Model High School and was commissioned into the Royal Indian Air Force (RIAF) to become a fighter pilot.

=== Air Force instructor ===
When India was partitioned in 1947, Masud joined the newly created Pakistan Air Force. He did not participate in the first war with India in 1947, as he joined the air force faculty. In 1948, F/O Masud joined the faculty of the Air Force Academy in Risalpur, where he began flight instructions to young air force cadets. In 1952, he did further training on flight management and qualified as a fighter pilot when he completed a Fighter Leader Course at the RAF. In 1957–58, Wg.Cdr. Masud was tasked by Air Cdr-in-C, Air Marshal Asghar Khan, to organize, train, and lead an aerobatics team, the PAF Sherdils, of 16 F-86 Sabre jets that would set a world record, validating the PAF's place among the well-regarded air arms of the world.

=== 1965 War and staff appointments ===
Gp Capt. Masud's first command assignment was as base commander of Sargodha Air Force Base, from which he would emerge as the top hero of the 1965 war.

In 1965, he actively participated in the second war with India when he led a team of fighter pilots, including Flt. Lt Mervyn Middlecoat, Sqn. Ldr. Cecil Chaudhry, and Sq. Ldr. M. M. Allam, against the Indian Air Force. Gp Capt. Masud flew against the Indian Air Force in the Sargodha Sector with great courage and was regarded as an ace fighter for his ability in dogfights against the Indian pilots.

From 1966 to 1969, Gp Capt. Masud continued his role as a flight instructor with the Air Force and was appointed in the Air AHQ as Director-General of Air Operations (DGAO). In 1969, Gp. Capt. Masud was promoted to one star rank, Air Commodore, and was being speculated as a probable future air force chief upon the retirement of Air Marshal Abdur Rahim Khan.

=== Bangladesh liberation war ===
In 1970, Air Cdre Masud was appointed as the Air Officer Commanding (AOC) of Dacca airbase, East Pakistan.

In April 1971, Air Cdre Masud relayed his concern to then-Governor East Vice-Admiral Syed Mohammad Ahsan and Eastern Command commander Lieutenant-General Yaqub Ali Khan, who decided to call upon President General Yahya Khan to visit East Pakistan. Air Cdre Masud was in clear view that the situation was such that the army could not hold the ground of it, and had lobbied for supporting the Ahsan-Yakob Mission for resolving the peaceful solution.

In March 1971, President Yahya Khan finally arrived in Dhaka and chaired a meeting at the Eastern Command HQ, where Air Cdre Masud argued in favor of a political solution, noting that "in the prevailing military imbalance, a semi-autonomous East Pakistan was far preferable to the certainty of a military defeat in the event that India decided to intervene". During the meeting, President Yahya interjected several times and was in view of agreeing with Air Cdre Masud's view and supported his stance by quoting, "You must surely know that I too do not want a war and am doing my best to persuade Mujib and Bhutto to find a way out of the crisis".

On 7 March 1971, Governor East Vice-Admiral Syed Mohammad Ahsan and Eastern Commander Lieutenant-General Yaqub Ali Khan were relieved of their respected posts, leaving to Lieutenant-General Tikka Khan who initiated the massive military crackdown after the raid in the Dhaka University. Air Commodore Masud suffered high-level local defections from his own staff when Group Captain A. K. Khandker and Wing Commander M. K. Bashar escaped to India in May 1971. During Operation Blitzkrieg, Masud refused an order to dispatch an airstrike against armed civilians.

During this time, Masud made many contacts with President Yahya Khan but was unable to reach him, eventually deciding to visit Army GHQ in Rawalpindi. Masud handed over the air command to Air Commodore Inamul Haque Khan and arrived in Pakistan but was unable to hold the meeting with President Yahya, which eventually led Masud to become disheartened and frustrated.

Despite urging against the early and premature retirement, Masud tendered his resignation from the Pakistan Air Force, which attracted the news media correspondents who tried getting his opinion, but he declined to comment.

=== Later life and death ===
After seeking retirement in July 1971, Masud worked as a civilian flight instructor for the Rawalpindi Flying Club from 1974 onwards for some years.

He was married to a German national, Elizabeth, who worked as a technician at Siemens Engineering in 1959; his wife died in 2019. He had one son, Salaar, who became a software engineer. Masud died due to a cardiac arrest in PAF Hospital in Islamabad and is buried at PAF cemetery in Chaklala; the place of burial of his wife is in Karachi.

== Awards and decorations ==
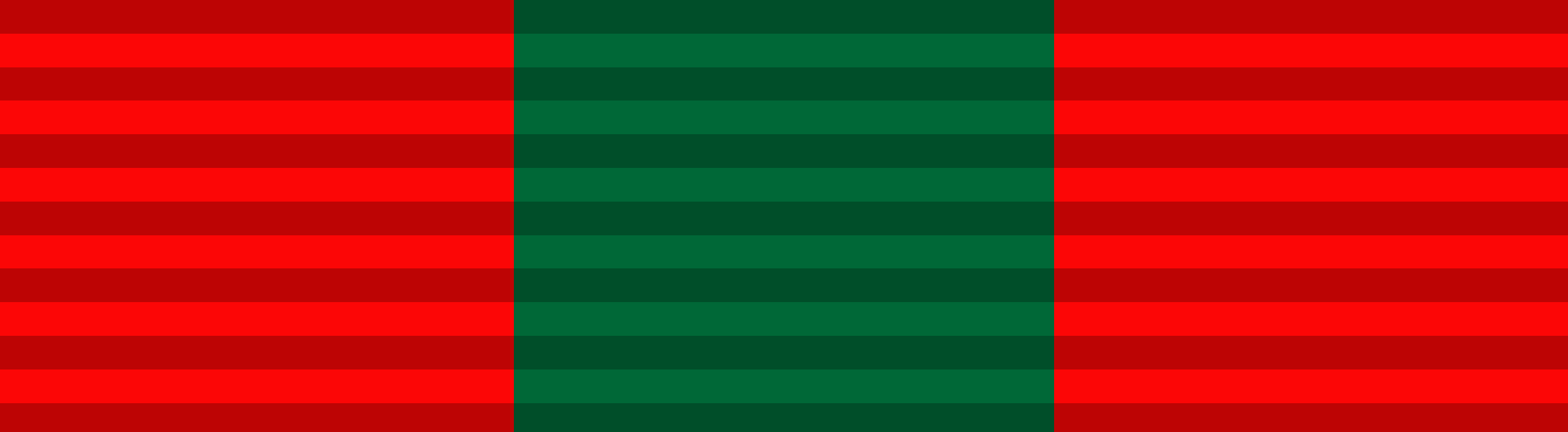

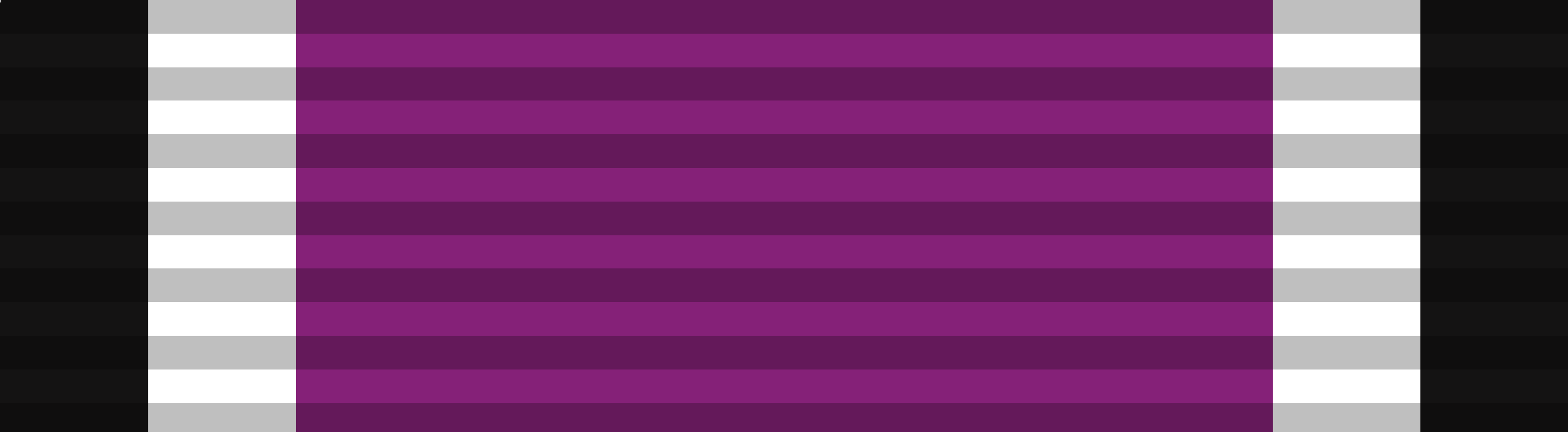

	Hilal-e-Jurat (Crescent of Courage) 1965 War		
Sitara-e-Basalat (Star of Good Conduct)	Tamgha-e-Diffa (General Service Medal)	Sitara-e-Harb 1965 War (War Star 1965)	Tamgha-e-Jang 1965 War (War Medal 1965)
Pakistan Tamgha (Pakistan Medal) 1947	Tamgha-e-Jamhuria (Republic Commemoration Medal) 1956	War Medal 1939-1945	Order of Independence (Jordan)

=== Foreign decorations ===
Foreign Awards
UK	War Medal 1939–1945
Jordan	Order of Independence

Military offices
Preceded by	Air Officer Commanding, Pakistan Air Force Base Dacca; 1970 – 7 March 1971	Succeeded by Air Commodore Inamul Haque Khan
