= No. 19 Squadron PAF =

Pakistani military unit, established 1958

No. 19 Squadron Sherdils
- Active: since 1958; 67 years ago
- Country: Pakistan
- Allegiance: Pakistan Armed Forces
- Branch: Pakistan Air Force
- Type: Fighter squadron
- Role: Air Superiority & OCU
- Nickname(s): Sherdils
- Motto(s): Urdu: ہر اک وار میرا ہے قہروغضب; Every strike of mine is drawn from fury and rage
- Mascot(s): Blue Eagle; Lion
- Aircraft: F-16
- Engagements: Indo-Pakistani war of 1965; Indo-Pakistani Air War of 1965; Indo-Pakistani War of 1971; Western front
- Battle honours: Pathankot (1965)

Commanders
- Notable commanders: Syed Sajad "Nosey" Haider

Aircraft flown
- Fighter: F-86 Sabre; Canadair Sabre; Shenyang F-6; Chengdu F-7P; F-16 ADF

The No. 19 Squadron is a multi-role squadron of the Pakistan Air Force, known for its rich history and significant operational achievements. Established in February 1958 at Mauripur airbase with 12 F-86F Sabres, the squadron has seen several relocations and equipment upgrades over the years. It played a pivotal role in the 1965 Indo-Pakistani war under the command of Squadron Leader Sajad Haider, demonstrating its prowess in Close Air Support missions. The squadron's legacy includes successful airstrikes against the Indian army and airfields, significantly impacting the course of the war.

== History ==
It was raised in February 1958 at Mauripur airbase with 12 F-86F Sabres. In 1962, the squadron shifted to Peshawar airbase and stayed there till 1967 when it was transferred back to Masroor. The squadron received Canadair Sabre Mk. 6s just before the 1971 War broke out and continued to operate the aircraft till 1977 when it was re-equipped with Shenyang F-6 air superiority fighters. After receiving Chengdu F-7Ps in 1990, the squadron was converted into an OCU and transferred to Mianwali airbase.

On 21 May 2014, the squadron was re-equipped with F-16 ADFs purchased from Jordan. A re-equipment ceremony was held for the occasion which was attended by the Army and Air force chiefs (Raheel Sharif and Tahir Rafique Butt) along with veterans from the squadron and high-ranking officials from the Pakistani and Jordanian diplomatic community.

=== Operational history ===
==== 1965 War ====
The 19 squadron took active part in the 1965 Indo-Pakistani war under the command of Squadron Leader Sajad Haider mainly carrying out Close Air Support (CAS) missions on Indian army convoys and IAF airfields. On the morning of 6 September, a patrol team of F-86s which was being led by Sajad happened to spot spearheading elements of the Indian army's Lahore invasion at Wagah rolling down the Grand Trunk road. The F-86s went on to strafe the convoys for roughly 15 minutes with their 5-inch Zuni rockets and .50 cal machine guns. These strikes significantly slowed down the main Indian advance towards Lahore and gave the Army crucial time to send in re-enforcements to the area.

In another strike on the IAF's Pathankot airbase, Sajad Haider led another team of 8 F-86 Sabres to Pathankot airbase to carry out what would be PAF's most successful airstrike against an IAF airbase during the war. Armed with Armor Piercing Incendiary (API) rounds and drop tanks, the Sherdils destroyed 7 Mig-21s, 5 Dassault Mystère IV and a single C-119 transport aircraft along with significant structural damage to the IAF base.

== See also ==
- 421st Fighter Squadron
