= Mervyn Middlecoat =

Pakistani air force officer (1940–1971)

Wing Commander Mervyn Middlecoat Sitara-e-Jurat & Bar (Note: "Bar" refers to a second award of the same honour.) SJ & Bar
- Born: Mervyn Leslie Middlecoat; 6 July 1940; Ludhiana, Punjab Province, British India
- Died: 12 December 1971 (aged 31); Okha, Gujarat, India
- Burial place: Remains not found
- Military career
- Allegiance: Pakistan
- Branch: Pakistan Air Force
- Service years: 1954–1971
- Rank: Wing Commander
- Nickname: Commander Leslie
- Service number: Pak/3550
- Units: No. 9 Squadron Griffins
- Commands: No. 9 Squadron Griffins
- Conflicts: Indo-Pakistani War of 1965; Operation Amritsar Radar; War of Attrition; Indo-Pakistani War of 1971 †
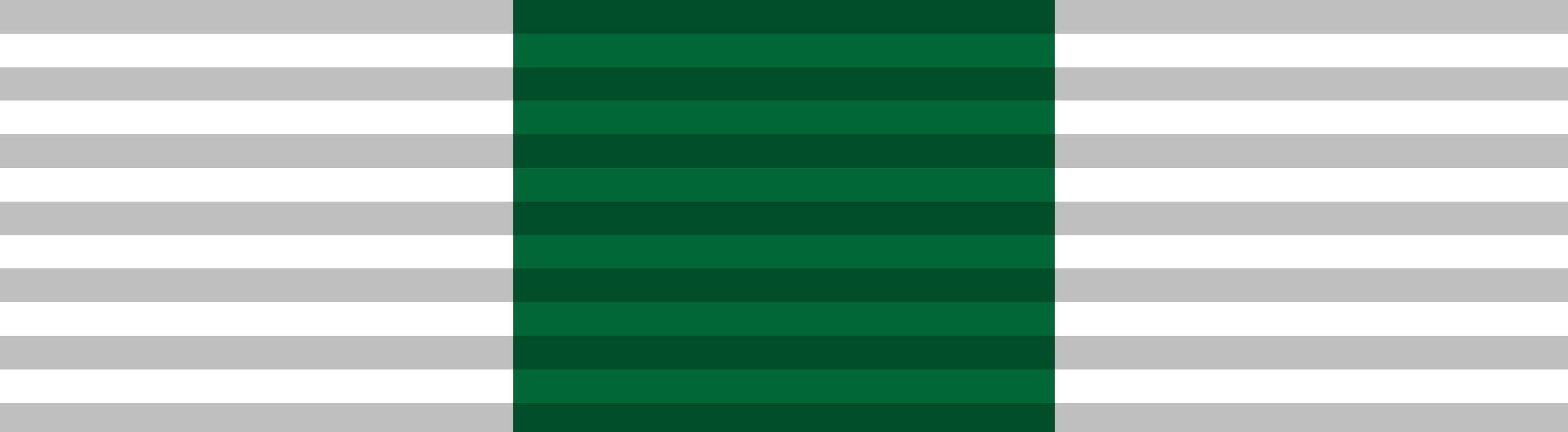
- Awards: Sitara-e-Jurat & Bar

Mervyn Leslie Middlecoat SJ & Bar (6 July 1940 – 12 December 1971) was a Pakistani fighter pilot in the Pakistan Air Force (PAF) who was involved in a number of aerial battles during the 1965 and 1971 Indo-Pakistani wars, before being shot down on 12 December 1971. He was one of a number of distinguished Pakistani strike and fighter pilots of the period. Before his death he was stationed at Mauripur, Karachi, where he flew the F-104 Starfighter.

== Early life ==
Middlecoat was born into an Anglo-Indian family in Ludhiana in July 1940 on a train traveling from Lahore to Delhi. He also had some French and Portuguese ancestry. His parents were Percy and Daisy Middlecoat (née Renaux). He received his early education at Lawrence College Murree, St. Anthony's High School (Lahore) and Burn Hall school ,Abbottabad. Middlecoat joined the PAF, passed out of the 16th General Duty Pilot (GDP) Course in 1954, and won the Best Performance Trophy in ground subjects.

Soft-spoken and mild mannered, Middlecoat was considered to be the epitome of an officer and a gentleman, besides also being an outstanding pilot. Although he flew a number of different aircraft during his service career, he mastered both the F-86 Sabre and the F-104 Starfighter.

On 27 September 1957, he married Jeanne Viegas, the daughter of a Christian family living in Lahore. On 21 October 1959, a daughter named Leslie Ann was born to the Middlecoats while he was stationed at Mauripur, Karachi.

== The 1965 War ==
Middlecoat's prowess as a pilot and leader were recognized early in his career and when Pakistan became the beneficiary of US military aid in the 1950s, he was selected, along with his close friend, Allauadin "Butch" Ahmed, to be the first two PAF officers to go to the US to train on the F-86 Sabre. Some years later, the same two officers were again selected as PAF pioneers to go to the US to train on the more advanced F-104 Starfighter. The F-104 was inducted in the PAF's No. 9 Squadron (Griffins).

As a Squadron Leader, Middlecoat commanded No. 9 Squadron during the 1965 war. Leading from the front, he kept the spirits of his boys high and guided his pilots in a highly professional manner. Besides undertaking dangerous photo-reconnaissance missions over Indian territory, including a key radar facility located in the grounds of a Sikh temple in Amritsar, Indian Punjab, he either shot down or badly damaged a high-flying IAF Canberra bomber egressing Pakistan airspace into India at night.

During the three-week war, Middlecoat flew 17 air defence sorties and three photo reconnaissance missions over forward Indian airbases. For his leadership and devotion to duty, he was awarded the Sitara-i-Jurat, the third highest award in the Pakistani military, in 1965.

== The 1971 War ==
Promoted to Wing Commander, at the outbreak of war on 3 December 1971 Middlecoat was on a training assignment with the Royal Jordanian Air Force. The day after he returned to Karachi, he volunteered for a mission to attack the heavily defended Indian airbase at Jamnagar on 12 December.

After strafing aircraft parked on the runway, Middlecoat and his wingman were forced to abort their mission when they were bounced by two IAF MIG-21 aircraft from No. 47 Squadron IAF. Middlecoat, as leader of the sortie, was entitled to egress first but instead told his younger wingman to depart ahead of him. Maintaining a high speed, he reduced altitude and managed to deflect the first missile fired at his Starfighter. However, with the lead MiG21 closing range, he was shot down over the Rann (Gulf) of Kutch. The Indian pilot who shot him down, Flight Lieutenant Bharat Bhushan Soni, saw Middlecoat eject and his parachute deploy. As he fell into the Arabian Sea, Soni requested for a pass over the crash site to see where he had landed but was denied the permission to do so as his command already had the coordinates of the location to send a rescue team from the Indian Navy; however, by the time potential rescuers arrived, Middlecoat was nowhere to be found. According to Soni, there is a 5 mile radius of shark infested waters at the area where the incident happened and Mervyn landed right in the middle of it. It was considered unlikely that he survived. Declared missing in action, he was posthumously awarded a Bar to the Sitara-i-Jurat. His remains were never found.

Such was Middlecoat's renown as a fighter pilot, leader and teacher that King Hussein of Jordan, a keen pilot, wrote to Middlecoat's widow, Jeanne, stating that his death was a personal loss. The King requested that Middlecoat be buried with the Jordanian flag under his head if he was to be wrapped in the Pakistani flag. Middlecoat had fought for the King earlier during the Six-Day War with Israel in June 1967.

His citation read:

On the outbreak of war on 3rd December 71, Wing Commander Mervyn L Middlecoat was on a training visit abroad. He returned to Pakistan immediately and joined operations with such keen interest that he inspired all squadron pilots. The day after his arrival he was detailed on a strike mission to the heavily defended Jamnagar airfield. While returning after the successful mission he was engaged by two enemy Mig-21s. In the encounter his aircraft was hit by an enemy missile. He was heard to be ejecting in Indian territory and was officially declared missing in action. For his devotion to duty, determination and courage he was awarded a Bar to the Sitara-i-Jurat and Sitara-i-Basalat. (See PAF History 1989)

== Legacy ==
A road in Mauripur was named Middlecoat Road in his honour. His sister, Norma, published True Children of the Raj under the name Helen Renaux in 2011, recalling their childhood.

== Awards and decorations ==
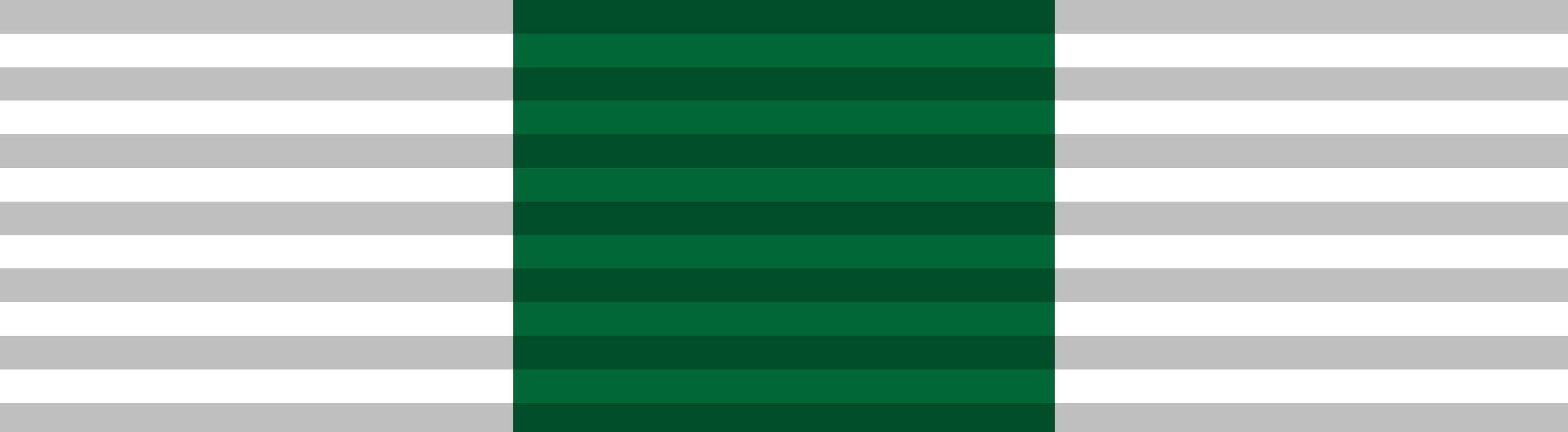

Sitara-e-Jurat & Bar (Star of Courage): 1. 1965 War; 2. 1971 War (Posthumous)	Tamgha-e-Diffa (General Service Medal) 1965 War Clasp		Sitara-e-Harb 1965 War (War Star 1965)
Sitara-e-Harb 1971 War (War Star 1971) Posthumous	Tamgha-e-Jang 1965 War (War Medal 1965)	Tamgha-e-Jang 1971 War (War Medal 1971) Posthumous	Tamgha-e-Jamhuria (Republic Commemoration Medal) 1956

== See also ==
- Cecil Chaudhry
- Pakistan Air Force § Notable personnel
