= Pakistan Air Force Hospitals =

Hospitals of Pakistan Air Force

Pakistan Air Force (PAF) hospitals are secondary and tertiary care hospitals dedicated to provide health facilities to the uniformed and civilian personnel of PAF. These hospitals are situated at various bases of PAF and include:

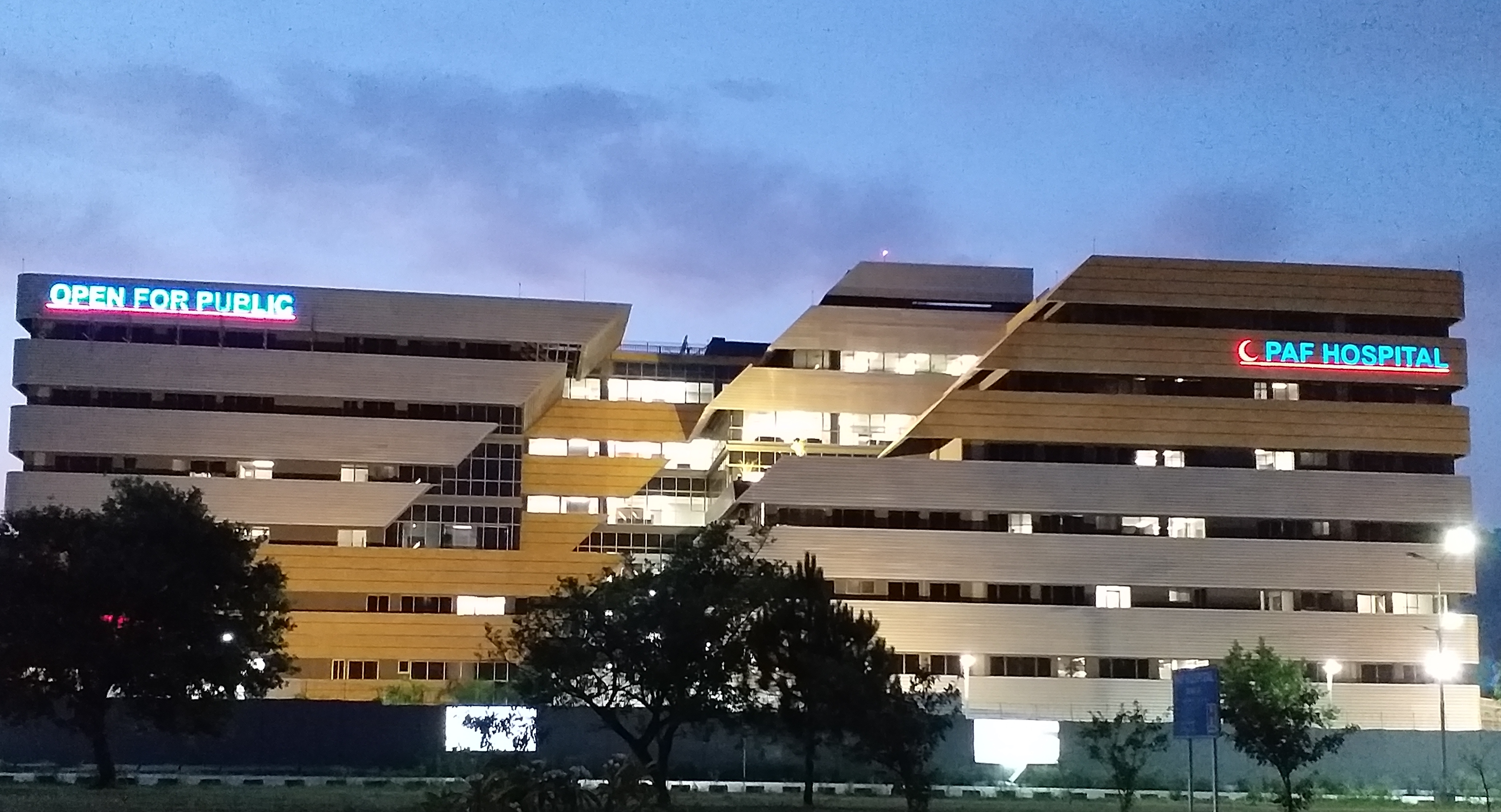
PAF Hospital Unit 2, Islamabad.

== Branches ==
- PAF Hospital, Islamabad
- PAF Hospital, Sargodha
- PAF Hospital, Lahore
- PAF Hospital, Mianwali
- PAF Hospital, Jacobabad
- PAF Hospital Rafiqui, Shorkot
- PAF Hospital Faisal Base, Karachi
- PAF Hospital Masroor base, Karachi

The doctors and the nurses are borrowed from the Army Medical Corps, Army Dental Corps and Armed Forces Nursing Services of Pakistan Army. However, lately the Air force has also started to induct the doctors directly. Soon after the inauguration of its first ever medical college here in Air University Islamabad, there was a dire need to meet the requirements of medical students and patients. Pakistan Air Force in Islamabad launched a state of the art 600 bed Hospital providing medical, surgical, gynae, urology, cardiology, ENT, eye, radiology, pathology, dermatology, psychiatry, and physiotherapy services. PAF Hospital Islamabad Unit 2 is open for general public, it is not specifically for the uniform personnel.

== See also ==
- Combined Military Hospital (CMH)
- Pakistan Air Force
