= Cecil Chaudhry =

Pakistani fighter pilot, academic and activist

Group Captain Cecil Chaudhry SJ SBt PP
- Born: 27 August 1941; Dalwal, Punjab, British India
- Died: 13 April 2012 (aged 70); Lahore, Punjab, Pakistan
- Education: St. Anthony High School, Lahore, Forman Christian College
- Military career
- Allegiance: Pakistan
- Branch: Pakistan Air Force
- Service years: 1958–1986
- Rank: Group Captain
- Service number: Pak/4055
- Unit: No. 5 Squadron Fighting Falcons
- Commands: Masroor Air Force Base; Sargodha Air Force Base; No. 32 Fighter Ground Attack Wing; No. 38 Multi-Role Wing; Combat Commander's School
- Conflicts: Indo-Pakistani War of 1965; Operation Eagle Strike; Indo-Pakistani War of 1971; Operation Chengiz Khan
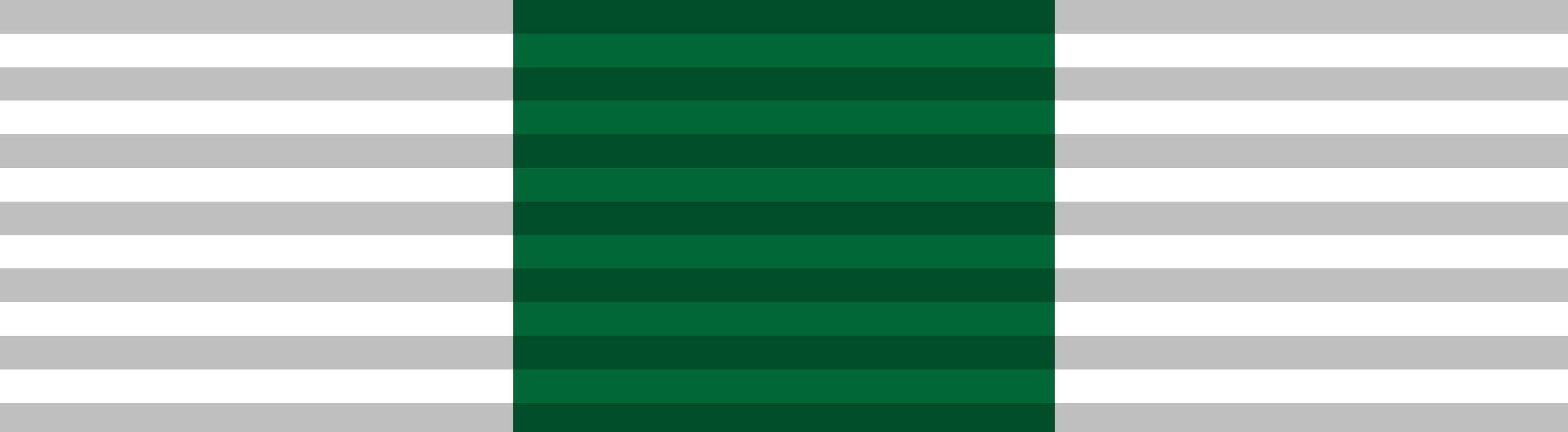
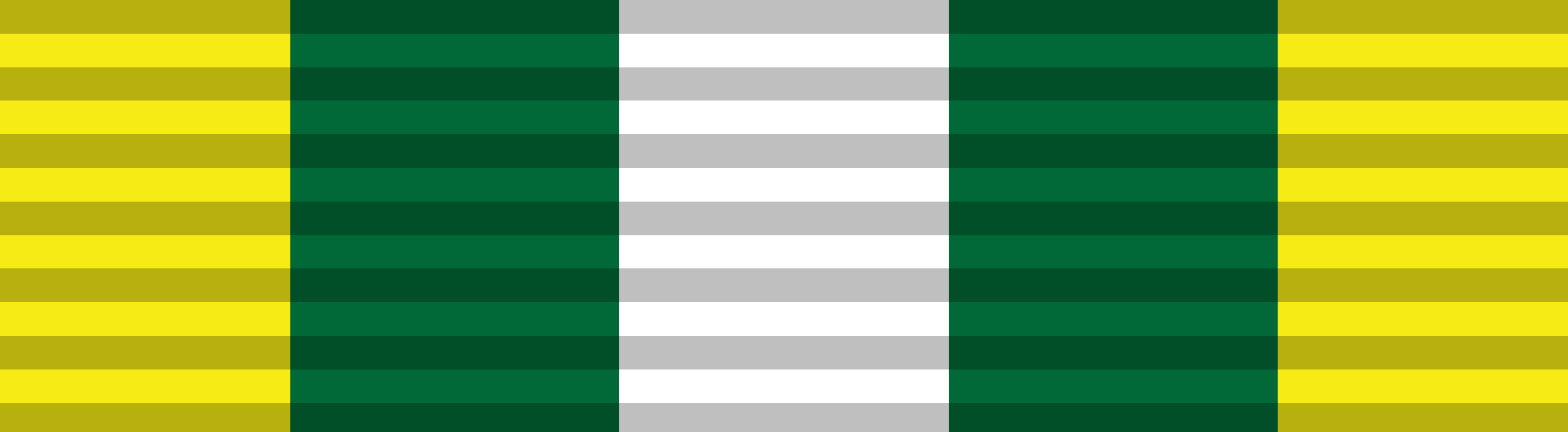
- Awards: Sitara-e-Jurat Sitara-e-Basalat Pride of Performance
- Other work: Educationist

Cecil Chaudhry (Note: Punjabi, Urdu: سیسل چودھری) SJ SBt PP (27 August 1941 – 13 April 2012) was a Pakistani academic, human rights activist, and a veteran fighter pilot. As a flight lieutenant, he fought in the Indo-Pakistani War of 1965 and as a squadron leader in the Indo-Pakistani War of 1971. During the 1965 war, Chaudhry and three other pilots, under the leadership of Wing Commander Anwar Shamim, attacked the Amritsar Radar Station in a difficult operation. He was awarded the Sitara-e-Jurat (Star of Courage) for his actions during that mission.

During the 1971 war, his aircraft was shot down by ground fire, Cecil ejected safely and was recovered by Pakistan's troops of the 40 Punjab in Zafarwal Sector.

== Early life and career ==
Chaudhry was born on 27 August 1941 to the only Christian (Roman Catholic) family of the village Dalwal, located in the Salt Range of Punjab, British India. His father, Elmer Chaudhry, hailing from East Punjab and then based in Lahore, was chief photographer with The Times, Lahore, as well as a physics and mathematics teacher at St. Anthony's High School. Cecil Chaudhry was schooled at St. Anthony's, before pursuing higher studies at the Forman Christian College, Lahore where he received his B.S. in physics.

As an Air Scout, he was awarded his glider pilot’s wings in 1956 by the then President of Pakistan, Iskander Mirza, at a ceremony in Karachi. He was admitted into the Pakistan Air Force Academy on 12 March 1958 and enrolled in the engineering program. In 1960, he received his double BSc in aeronautics and mechanical engineering along with becoming an ace fighter pilot upon graduating from the PAF Academy. After nearly 28 years of service, he retired from the Pakistan Air Force in 1986.

== Later life ==
Cecil Chaudhry became an educationist after leaving the air force and was affiliated with the Punjab Education Foundation. He served as principal of St. Anthony's College for many years, before becoming principal of Saint Mary's Academy, Lalazar, Rawalpindi, succeeding Sister Eileen Ann Daffy. He retired from this post in July 2011.

Chaudhry remained an influential, independent human rights activist, as well as working for the betterment of children with disabilities and for educational reform. He advised and worked closely with the late Shahbaz Bhatti from the early 1990s onwards and had been Executive Secretary of the All Pakistan Minorities Alliance (APMA) since its inception. He was also affiliated with the National Commission for Justice and Peace and was instrumental in leading the fourteen-year campaign that led to the restoration of Pakistan's joint electorate system in 2002.

== Awards and decorations ==
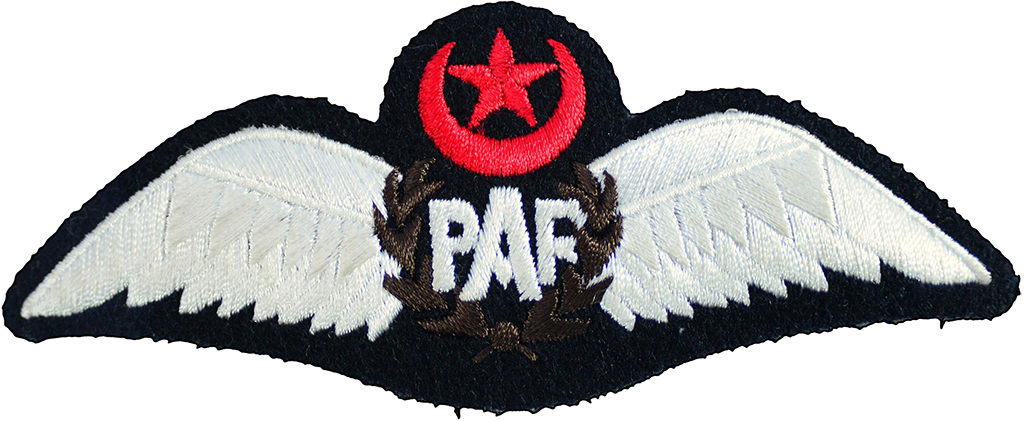

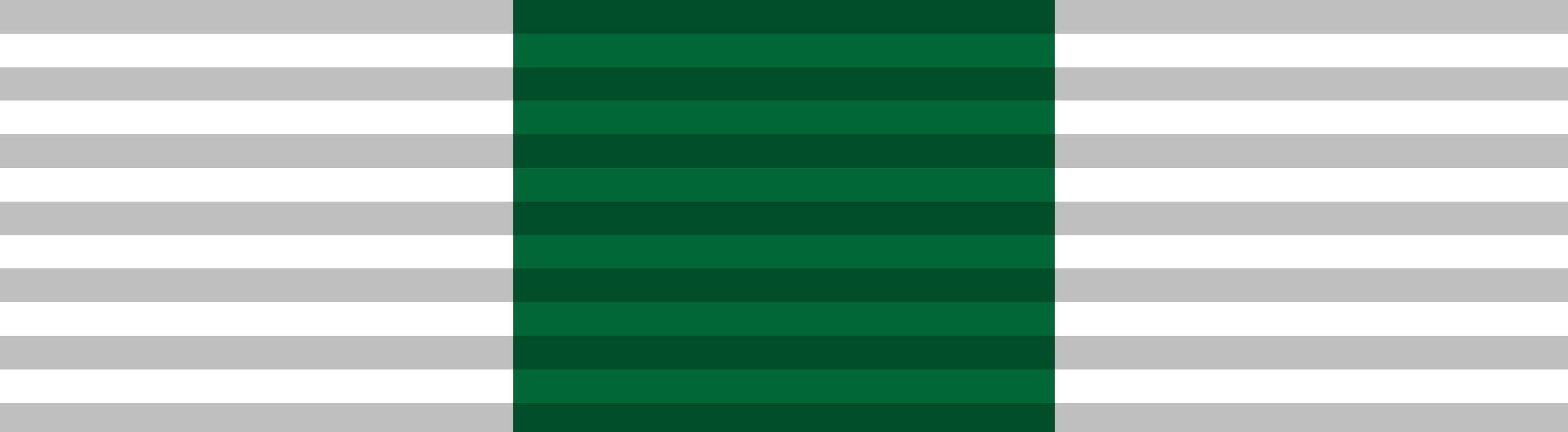

PAF GD(P) Badge RED (More than 3000 Flying Hours)
	Sitara-e-Jurat (Star of Courage) 1965		
Sitara-e-Basalat (Star of Good Conduct)	Tamgha-e-Diffa (General Service Medal): 1. 1965 War Clasp; 2. 1971 War Clasp	Sitara-e-Harb 1965 War (War Star 1965)	Sitara-e-Harb 1971 War (War Star 1971)
Tamgha-e-Jang 1965 War (War Medal 1965)	Tamgha-e-Jang 1971 War (War Medal 1971)	Tamgha-e-Sad Saala Jashan-e- Wiladat-e-Quaid-e-Azam (100th Birth Anniversary of Muhammad Ali Jinnah) 1976	Hijri Tamgha (Hijri Medal) 1979

Other Honours
Pakistan	President's Award for Pride of Performance (Education – 2013)

== Death and legacy ==
Cecil Chaudhry died of lung cancer at the age of 70 in Lahore on 13 April 2012 after a long illness. He was buried with full military honors at the Jail Road's Christian Cemetery in Lahore, Pakistan. His daughter, Michelle Chaudhry, founded the Cecil & Iris Chaudhry Foundation, an NGO active in the defence of minorities in Pakistan, in his memory. Among his survivors are three daughters and a son.

== See also ==
- Mervyn Middlecoat
