= Nazir Latif =

- Born: Nazir Latif; 10 July 1927; Rawalpindi, Punjab Province, British Indian Empire
- Died: 30 June 2011; Islamabad, Islamabad Capital Territory (ICT)
- Burial place: Islamabad, Islamabad Capital Territory (ICT)
- Military career
- Allegiance: Pakistan
- Branch: Pakistan Air Force
- Service years: 1950–1972
- Rank: Air Commodore
- Nickname: Bill Latif
- Units: No. 5 Squadron Falcons
- Commands: No. 7 Squadron Bandits; No. 6 Squadron Globe Trotters; No. 16 Squadron Panthers; No. 17 Squadron Tigers; Masroor Air Force Base; Faisal Air Force Base; Director of Operations and Plans at the Air Headquarters (DOPAHQ)
- Conflicts: Indo-Pakistani War of 1965; Aerial warfare in 1965 India Pakistan War; Indo-Pakistani War of 1971; East Pakistan Air Operations, 1971
- Awards: Sitara-e-Jurat (1965); Sitara-e-Jurat (1971)

Nazir Latif SJ and Bar (10 July 1927 – 30 June 2011) was an air commodore in the Pakistan Air Force and a former director-general of the Operations and Plans at the Air Headquarters, Islamabad. Latif was one of the distinguished Christian pilots who participated and fought, for Pakistan side, in 1965 Indo-Pak War and the 1971 Bangladesh Liberation War.

== Air Force career ==
Bill Latif had always wanted to be a fighter pilot and joined the Pakistan Air Force soon after the Creation of Pakistan in 1947. He was accepted in Pakistan Air Force Academy in 1947. He did 8th GD pilot's course but because of his high standard in flying, was upgraded to the 7th GD (P) course and graduated in 1950. Nazir was sent to Great Britain where he attended and graduated from Royal Air Force College Cranwell in 1954.

In 1958, he was promoted to Wing Commander when Air Marshal Asghar Khan assumed as Chief of Air Staff of the Pakistan Air Force.

In 1971 he was base commander of the Mauripur Base. Latif was awarded the Sitara-e-Jurat twice for his services in 1965 and 1971 wars between Pakistan and India.

Latif worked in Khorramshahr, Iran, Amman, Jordan and Bahrain between the years from 1976 until he retired in his mid 70's.

In 2007 he was shot and injured by some unidentified persons while out walking.

Latif died on June 30, 2011, in the Pakistan Air Force Hospital in Islamabad.
