= Indo-Pakistani air war of 1965 =

Armed conflict between India and Pakistan

Indo-Pakistani aerial war of 1965
- Part of the Indo-Pakistani war of 1965
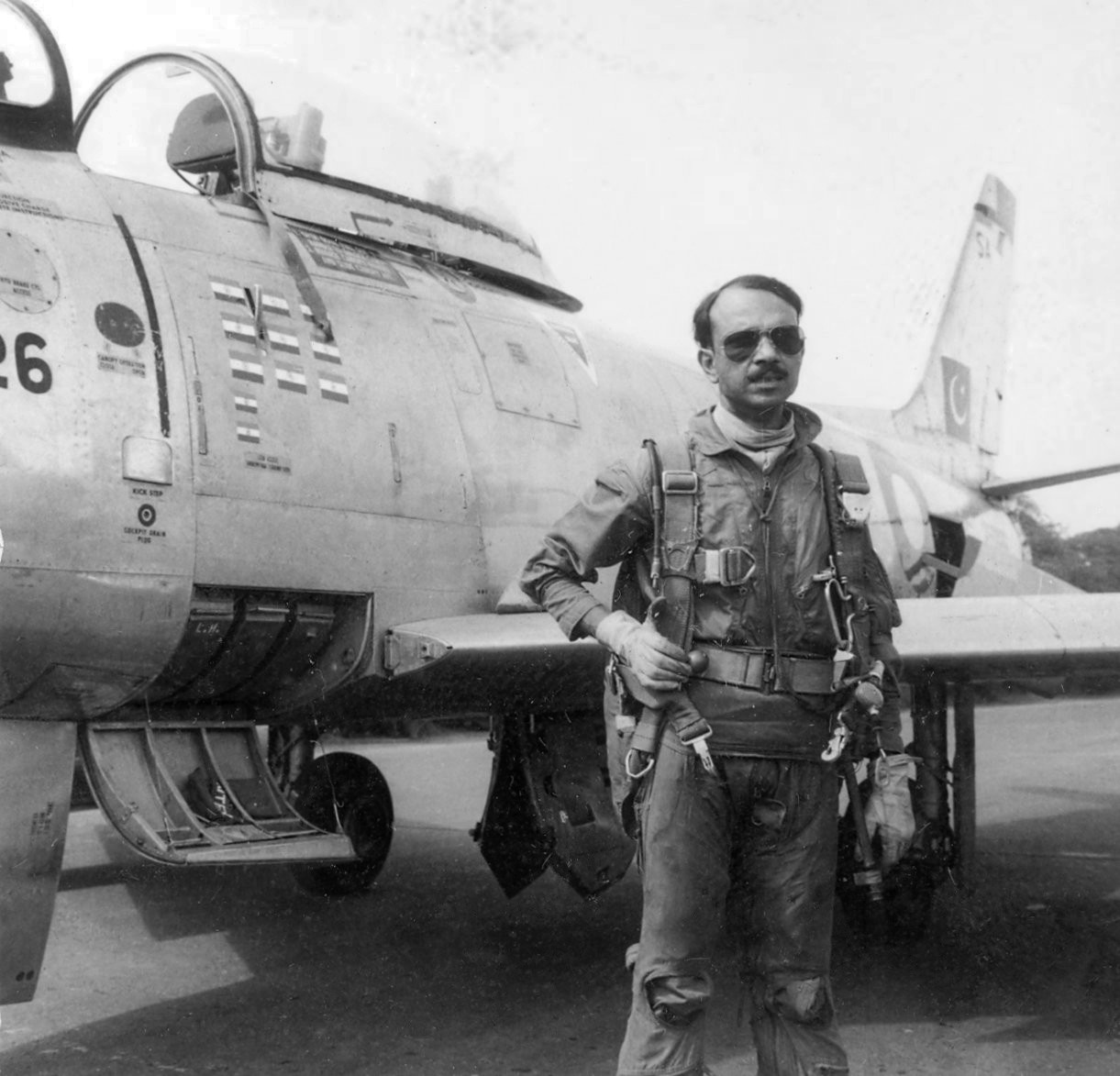
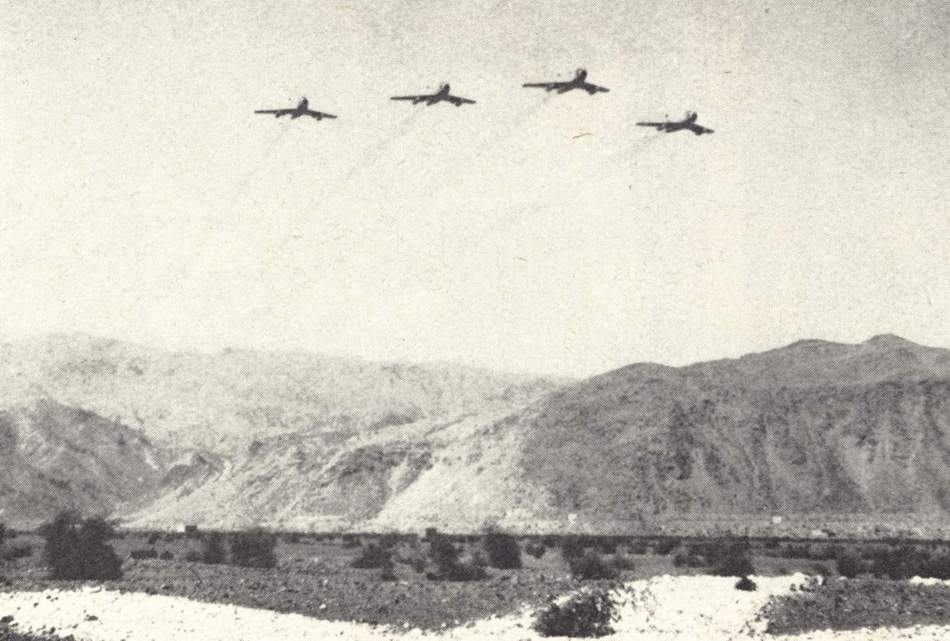
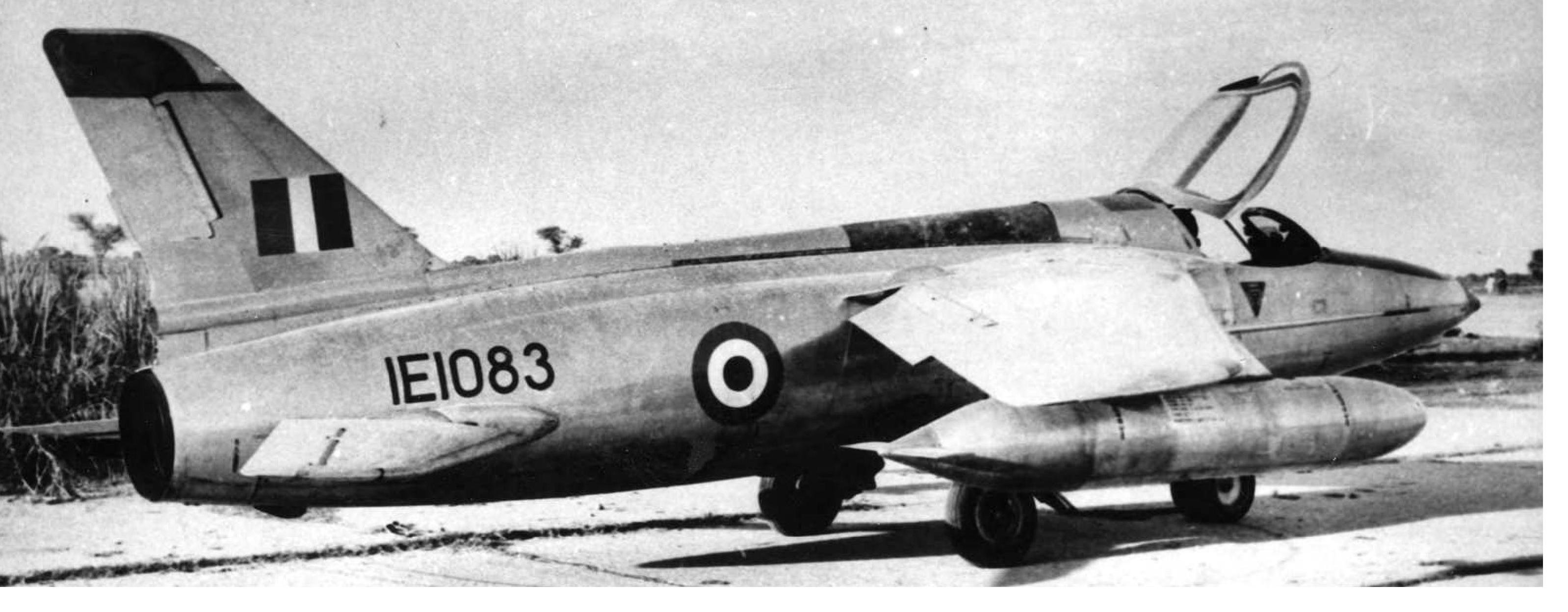
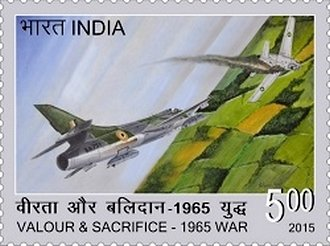
- Clockwise from top left: M.M. Alam poses with his F-86 Sabre; Formation of PAF F-86F Sabres returning to base; Commemorative India Post stamp; IAF Folland Gnat F.1
Date	August – 23 September 1965
Location	South Asia
Result	Tashkent Declaration; United Nations-mandated ceasefire
Territorial changes	Status quo ante bellum

Belligerents
India	Pakistan

Commanders and leaders
ACM Arjan Singh	AM Nur Khan

Units involved
Indian Air Force	Pakistan Air Force

Strength
700+ aircraft	280 aircraft

Casualties and losses
Neutral claim: 60–75 aircraft; Indian claims: 35–59 aircraft lost Thirteen IAF aircraft lost in accidents, and three Indian civilian aircraft shot down; Pakistani claim: 110–113 aircraft destroyed	Neutral claim: 20 aircraft; Pakistani claim: 14–19 aircraft lost; Indian claim: 43–73 aircraft destroyed

During the Indo-Pakistani war of 1965, the Indian and Pakistani Air Forces engaged in large-scale aerial combat for the first time. In the air war, which took place in September, both air forces conducted thousands of defensive and offensive sorties over Indian and Pakistani airspace. Both India and Pakistan claimed victory in the air war; Pakistan claimed to have destroyed 104 Indian aircraft and lost 19, and India claimed to have destroyed 73 Pakistani aircraft and lost 35 of its own. The air war ended in a stalemate.

== Background ==
The war began in early August 1965, and fighting was initially confined mainly to the ground. As hostilities progressed, however, both sides began air operations. Although India and Pakistan had fought in the First Kashmir War, shortly after the partition of India in 1947, that war was more limited in scale than the 1965 conflict; air operations had been largely confined to interdiction, re-supply and troop transport. One Indian fighter aircraft had intercepted a Pakistani transport in the earlier war, but there was no significant air-to-air combat. During the 1965 conflict, however, the Pakistan Air Force flew a total of 2,364 sorties; the Indian Air Force flew 3,937 sorties.

== Main battle ==
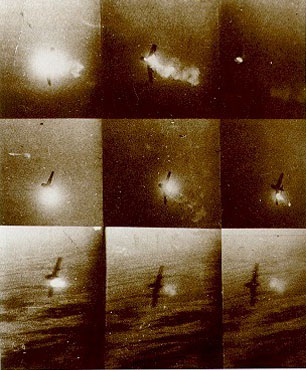
Pakistani Sabre shot down in combat by an Indian Gnat in September 1965, seen from the Indian aircraft

The aerial phase of the war began on 1 September 1965, when the Indian Air Force (IAF) responded to an urgent call for air strikes against the Pakistani Army (which had begun Operation Grand Slam. The IAF quickly launched 26 aeroplanes (12 de Havilland Vampires and 14 Dassault Mystère IVs) to blunt the Pakistan Army's offensive in Chhamb. The IAF's 45th Squadron was tasked with close air support of Indian troops. The squadron, recently moved from Pune to Pathankot after the 220th Squadron was merged into it, was commanded by S. K. "Marshal" Dhar. Group Captain Roshan Suri painted a grim picture of the Indian Army's position at Akhnoor and the Pakistan Army's armoured thrust at Chhamb, on the Tawi River near Jammu. Twenty-eight aircraft (12 Vampires and 16 Mysteres) were used, and the first planes took off at 17:19 hours. The planes flew in formation and strafed Pakistani tanks and ground targets, although friendly fire was also later reported. When the Indian aircraft were sighted, the Pakistan Air Force (PAF) scrambled two F-86 Sabres (flown by S/L Sarfraz Rafiqui of the No. 5 Squadron and F/L Imtiaz Bhatti of No. 15 Squadron) to intercept. In the ensuing dogfight over Chhamb, where Rafiqui took on the flight leader and wingman and Bhatti went after the element leader and element wingman, the IAF lost all four of its Vampires; they were flown by Squadron Leader Aspi Kekobad Bhagwagar (flight leader), Flight Lieutenant Vijay Madhav Joshi (element leader), Flight Lieutenant Satish Bharadwaj (element wingman) and Flight Lieutenant (later Group Captain) Shrikrishna Vishnu Phatak (wingman). Both Pakistani pilots claimed two aircraft kills each.

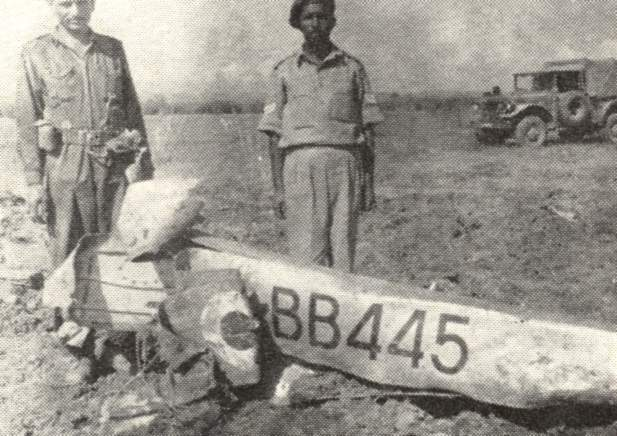
Wreckage of an IAF Vampire shot down by the PAF over Chhamb

The IAF withdrew about 130 Vampires and over 50 Ouragons from front-line service. Although India's use of fixed-winged Vampires was later criticized, eight of the 12 Vampires successfully completed their tasks; 14 Mysteres returned unscathed, and the IAF claimed success in slowing the Pakistan Army's momentum. Both sides supported their ground forces on 2 September, but no major aerial engagement was observed.

The PAF's Sabres forced the IAF to send Folland Gnat fighters to the forward base at Pathankot; India used Mysteres flying at slow speed as bait to lure the Sabres to attack, and the waiting Gnats would take them on. Two Sabres were scrambled, but one had to turn back when the pilot could not jettison its fuel tanks. The other, flown by F/L Yusaf Ali Khan, spotted the IAF planes and tried positioning himself behind them before attacking. As Khan got them in his cross-hairs, however, he was surrounded by a group of Gnats under attack. A Lockheed F-104 Starfighter in the area was sent to the dogfight, and another one was scrambled from the base. The first Starfighter passed through the dogfight at supersonic speed; the Gnats, after scoring a kill, began to leave. IAF Squadron Leader Trevor Keelor of No. 23 Squadron claimed to have shot down an F-86 Sabre on 3 September for the IAF's first air-combat victory of the war, and received the Vir Chakra; however, the Sabre made it back to the base. Its pilot, Khan, received the Sitara-e-Jurat for surviving the dogfight against six Gnats and bringing the damaged Sabre back home. An IAF Gnat pilot was overheard warning others of the incoming Starfighter. A Gnat flown by S/L Brij Pal Singh Sikand mistakenly landed at an abandoned airstrip in Pasrur after Sikand thought he had safely crossed the border. After realising his mistake, Sikand's takeoff attempt was aborted due to a Pakistan Army jeep on the runway; he was taken prisoner, and later handed over to the PAF. A Starfighter flown by F/L Hakimullah Khan at supersonic speed was credited with forcing the Gnat down, and the Gnat is on display at the Pakistan Air Force Museum in Karachi. It was flown from Pasrur to Sargodha by S/L Saad Hatmi, who evaluated its flight performance and downplayed its effectiveness in a dogfight.

On 4 September, an F-86 Sabre was lost. The PAF said that the cause was friendly ground fire, but the IAF said that they shot it down.

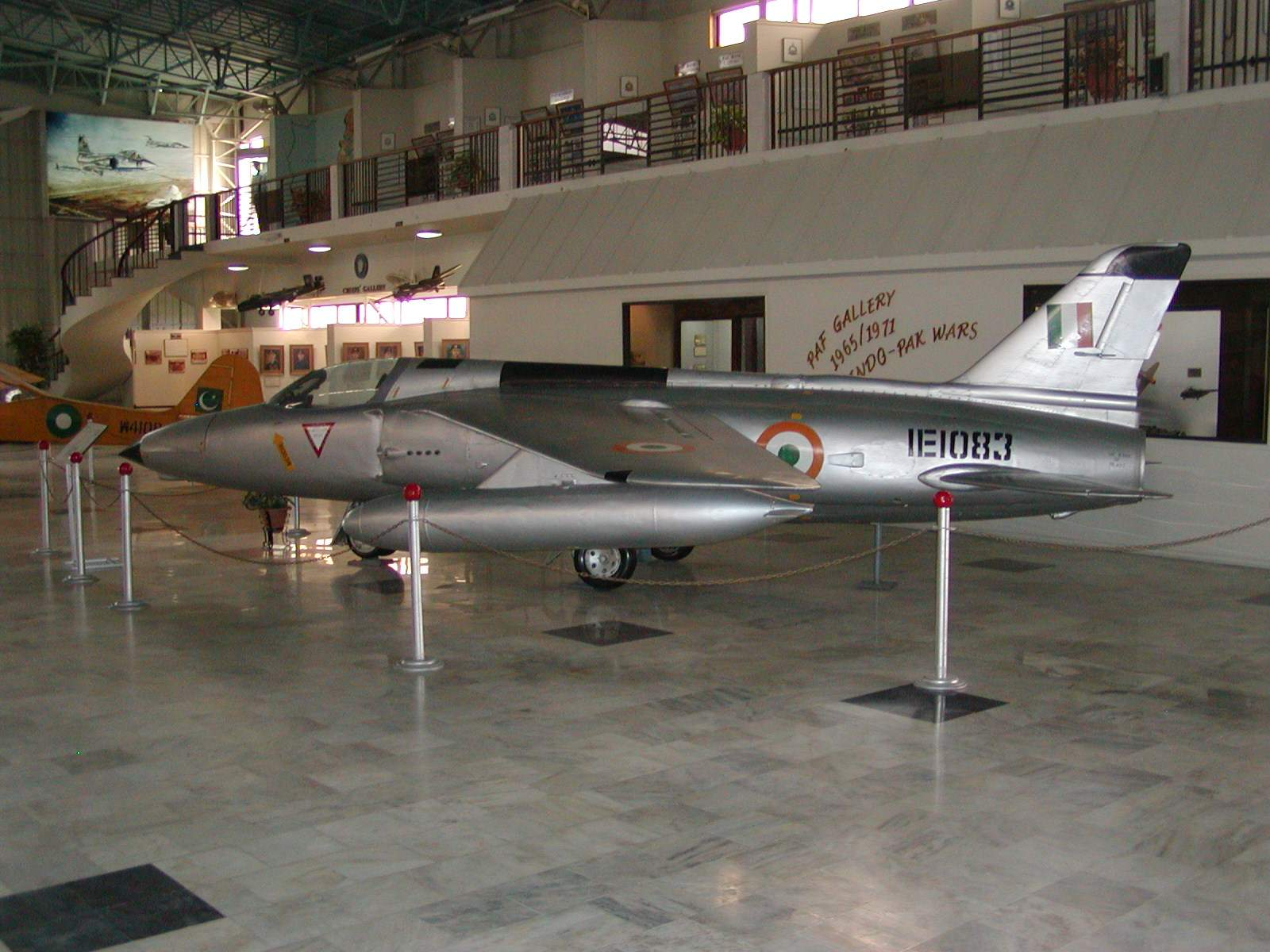
IAF Folland Gnat at the PAF Museum

Bhatti had 34 combat missions, the most flown by any pilot during the war. According to Pakistani sources, Muhammad Mahmood Alam reportedly shot down seven Indian aircraft (two of which were "probable". During a sortie on 7 September, five IAF Hawker Hunter aircraft were shot down by Alam over the Sargodha airbase in one minute; Alam claimed victory over four in 30 seconds. His claim was contested by the IAF, which denied losing five Hawker Hunter aircraft that day; several experts, including retired PAF Air Commodore Sajad Haider, also discredited Alam's claim about the sortie. No verifiable gun camera footage of Alam's kills was made public by Pakistani authorities.

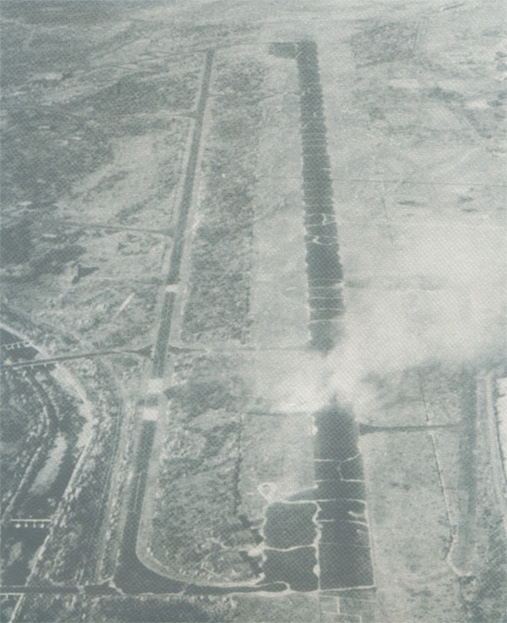
Smoke rises from India's Pathankot airbase during airstrikes by the PAF's No. 19 Squadron led by Sajad Haider.

On 6 September, the Indian Army crossed the border at Lahore to relieve pressure on the Chamb Jaurian sector. That evening, the PAF responded with attacks on Indian airfields at Pathankot, Adampur and Halwara. The IAF lost almost ten aircraft on the ground at Pathankot, but the attacks on Adampur and Halwara were unsuccessful. The Adampur strike, led by S/L M. M. Alam, turned back before reaching Adampur; the Halwara strike, led by S/L Sarfraz Rafiqi, was impossible due to IAF combat air patrol. Two Indian Hunters were lost in air combat. Both Indian pilots survived, ejecting over their base, but both Pakistani pilots (including Rafiqui) were killed. Rafiqui had shot down two Vampires and the first of the Hunters, posthumously receiving the Sitara-e-Jurat for the Chhamb action and the Hilal-i-Jurat for Halwara. F/L Cecil Chaudhry returned from the pursuit.

According to Indian sources, the PAF parachuted 135 Special Services Group (SSG) commandos at three Indian airfields (Halwara, Pathankot and Adampur) on 7 September. The attempt was an "unmitigated disaster". Only ten commandos returned to Pakistan, and the rest were prisoners of war (including a commander, Major Khalid Butt). The troops landed in residential areas of Halwara and Adampur, where villagers caught them and handed them over to police.

That day, the IAF mounted 33 sorties against the heavily guarded Sargodha Airfield Complex, owned by the PAF. They lost two Mysteres and three Hunters to local PAF squadrons. One of the Indian Hunter pilots, who ejected near Sargodha, was taken prisoner and released after the war. One of the crippled Mysteres was involved in a dogfight with a Starfighter, shooting each other down. The Pakistani pilot ejected; S/L Ajamada B. Devayya was killed, and received a posthumous Maha Vir Chakra.

During the 7 September PAF raid on Kalaikunda, Indian F/L A. T. Cooke engaged three PAF Sabres. Cooke shot one down and damaged a second; out of ammunition, he chased away the third Sabre (which was shot down by his wingman). On 8 September, an Indian S-75 Dvina missile was fired against an unidentified target believed to have been on a night mission above Ghaziabad (near Delhi).

The war then lessened in intensity, with occasional clashes between the IAF and the PAF. Both air forces changed their strategy from air interdiction to ground attack and concentrated their efforts on soft-skinned vehicles, supply lines, wagons carrying ammunition, and armoured vehicles. IAF English Electric Canberras raided several Pakistani bases. A 10 September battle involved eight aeroplanes over the River Beas: two PAF F-86 Sabres (flown by S/L Muniruddin Ahmad and F/L Imtiaz Bhatti) and six IAF planes – four Mysteres and two Gnats – with two 30 mm Aden cannons, led by F/L V. Kapila and F/L Harry Sidhu. Both IAF pilots said that their guns jammed. Both PAF pilots said that they shot and damaged one IAF aeroplane each. Same-day IAF records acknowledge losing one Mystere, with the pilot (Fg Off D. P. Chinoy safely ejecting in Pakistan during the evening and walking back to safety at night.

On 13 September, another encounter took place between PAF Sabres from Sargodha and IAF Gnats from the No. 2 Squadron. An Indian Gnat was shot down by a PAF F-86 Sabre flown by F/L Yusaf Ali Khan, but the Indian pilot ejected safely. The other Gnat was damaged in combat by F/L Imtiaz Bhatti. Although its pilot returned to the base, All India Radio said that he died of injuries sustained during combat. After he reportedly died on landing, his funeral was attended by the president of India. Khan was credited with a kill; Bhatti was credited with damaging the IAF Gnat, despite later confirmation that the injured pilot and the Gnat crash-landed. Later on the night of 13/14 September, Indian Canberras made the war's deepest penetration into Pakistani airspace and attacked bases near Peshawar and Kohat. Instead of bombing the Peshawer runway, however, IAF bombers mistook the mall road in Peshawer as the runway and dropped their bombs there instead. The Canberras were intercepted by a Pakistani F-104 near Lahore, but evaded the Starfighter and returned home safely. They also encountered F-86 Sabres, one of which damaged the Canberras. A Pakistani F-86 Sabre crashed while making an evasive maneuver in an attempt to escape pursuit by a Gnat which was defending the Canberra bombers, and the PAF pilot was killed. The Gnat pilot, W/C Singh, was credited with an aerial victory for the incident near Amritsar. Pakistan acknowledged losing an F-86 Sabre and its pilot, S/L Allaudin "Butch" Ahmad, who was killed in action while leading four aeroplanes attacking an ammunition train near Gurdaspur, Amritsar.

On 16 September, an IAF Hunter and a PAF F-86 Sabre were shot down over Halwara. The IAF pilot was killed, but the Pakistani pilot ejected and spent the rest of the war as a POW. A Pakistani Cessna and an Auster observation aircraft were also shot down that day.

On 18 September, a Sabre was shot down by a Gnat over Amritsar piloted by Amar Jit Singh Sandhu; the incident was reported by the District Collector, who witnessed the dogfight. That day, a Pakistani Sabre shot down a civilian Indian aircraft after the civilian plane identified itself; the PAF pilot assumed that it was on a reconnaissance mission. Years later, the pilot wrote to the Indian pilot's daughter and apologized for shooting down the aircraft. The plane was carrying Gujarat Chief Minister Balwant Rai.

On 19 September, a Gnat and two Sabres were shot down over Chawinda. One of the Sabres was credited to S/L Denzil Keelor, the brother of Trevor Keelor, who was credited with the first Indian aerial victory of the war. The following day, another two Hunters and an F-86 Sabre were lost over Kasur, Pakistan.

The F-86 was vulnerable against the Folland Gnat, nicknamed "Sabre Slayer." The Gnat is credited by independent and Indian sources with shooting down seven Pakistani Canadair Sabres (Note: Licence-built North American F-86 Sabres with Canadian engines.) in the 1965 war; two Gnats were downed by PAF fighters.

At one point, the IAF was operating 200 air missions simultaneously. Gnats from the 9th and 23rd squadrons played a significant role in major air battles. On 21 September, IAF Canberras made a daylight strike in Pakistan on the radar complex in Badin. Under Wing Commander Peter Wilson, six Canberras from No. 16 Squadron took off from Agra (over 1,000 km from Badin) and proceeded towards the radar complex at low altitude. About 80 miles (130 km) short of the target, one Canberra climbed to an altitude of 10,000 feet as a decoy before returning to base; the other five Canberras continued towards the target. The group then separated; four aircraft approached the target in two sections, two minutes apart, at low altitude before climbing to 7,000 feet. They made bombing runs, dropping about 10,000 lbs of explosives. Wilson then approached from the south at an altitude of 30 feet, firing a salvo of 68 mm rockets at the radar dome.

That day, a PAF F-104 intercepted a Canberra bomber on its way back from Sargodha and shot it down. Hunter pilot F/L K. C. Cariappa, son of Field Marshal K. M. Cariappa (the Indian Army's first commander-in-chief) was shot down by anti-aircraft fire; he ejected, and became a POW. Identifying the wounded soldier at Kargil, Radio Pakistan announced the capture of the younger Cariappa. General Ayub Khan contacted General Cariappa, who was retired in his hometown of Mercara, with information about his son's safety. When Khan offered to release his son immediately, Cariappa reportedly told him to treat his son no differently from any other POW: "He is my son no longer. He is the child of this country, a soldier fighting for his motherland like a true patriot. My many thanks for your kind gesture, but I request you to release all or release none. Give him no special treatment." A ceasefire was declared on the night of 22 September.

== Losses ==
Each side made conflicting claims. Pakistani sources said that Indian losses ranged from 59 to 110, and Pakistani losses ranged from 18 to 43. According to Indian sources, the Indian Air Force's aircraft-attrition rate (1.5%) was lower than that of the PAF (1.82%).

One factor which makes it difficult to determine the outcome of the 1965 air war is the number of planes lost in the air versus those lost on the ground due to bombing. Up to 60 percent of Indian aircraft losses occurred on the ground during the attacks on Kalaikkunda and Pathankot.

IAF Marshal Arjan Singh said that despite being inferior in quality, his air force achieved air superiority in three days. Kenneth Werrell wrote that the PAF "did well in the conflict and probably had the edge". When the war began, it had about 100 F-86s; India had five times the number of more-modern combat aircraft. Pakistan had a "decade's experience with the Sabre", however, and experienced pilots. India and Pakistan made disputed claims of losses in the air war.

	Indian claims	Pakistani claims	Independent sources
Combat flying	4,073+ sorties	2,279 sorties	–
Aircraft lost	59 IAF, 43 PAF. Indian sources claim an additional 13 IAF aircraft were lost in accidents.	19 PAF, 104 IAF	20 PAF, 60–75 IAF
Aerial victories	17 (+ 3 postwar)	30	–

== Legacy ==
The 1965 war led India to refine its tactics, which were decisive in the 1971 war; Pakistani forces did not realize how much they relied on full ground-based defensive radar coverage and an adequate supply of air-to-air missiles. India established a modern early warning radar system with Soviet aid, including the recently introduced Fansong-E low-level radar linked to the SA-2 Guideline system and a large number of anti-aircraft guns. By December 1971, the IAF had 36 squadrons (10 of which were deployed in the Bengal sector) and about 650 combat aircraft.

The US imposed a 10-year arms embargo on both sides as a result of the 1965 war. This had no effect on India (which looked to Britain, France and the Soviet Union for arms) but was disastrous for Pakistan, which was limited to 90 obsolete, second-hand Sabres from Iran, 28 Mirage IIIs from France, and 74 maintenance-intensive Shenyang F-6s. It could not replace losses to its (already weak) force of B-57s or acquire realistic numbers of modern interceptors.

== See also ==
- Indo-Pakistani air war of 1971
