= 1965 Sargodha airstrike =

Indian aerial operation during the 1965 Indo-Pak War

Sargodha airstrike
- Part of Indo-Pakistani war of 1965 and Indo-Pakistani air war of 1965
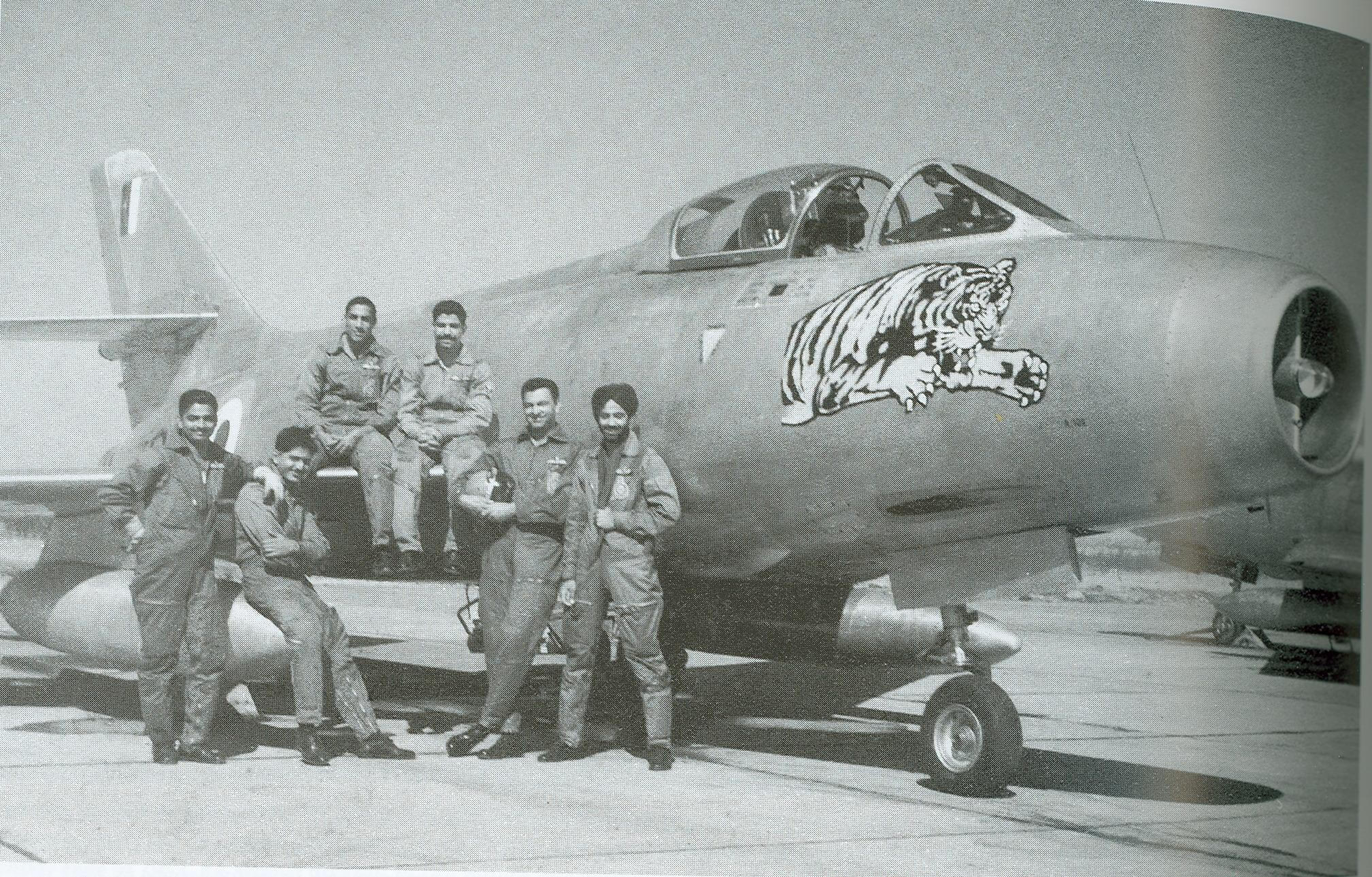
- Indian pilots celebrate after a strike mission
Date	7 September 1965; 61 years ago
Location	Sargodha, Punjab, Pakistan
Result	Inconclusive

Belligerents
Pakistan	India

Commanders and leaders
Air Marshal Nur Khan MM Alam	Air Chief Marshall Arjan Singh Om Prakash Taneja; Sudarshan Handa; D.S. Jog

Units involved
Pakistan Air Force: Multiple F-86 and F-104 CAP aircraft; M2 and M23 anti-aircraft weapons	Indian Air Force: No. 1 Sqn; No. 5 Sqn; No. 7 Sqn; No. 8 Sqn; No. 27 Sqn; No. 32 Sqn

Strength
Multiple F-86s and F-104 on Combat air patrol duty; Multiple M2 and M23 anti-aircraft guns	22 Mystères; 10 Hunters; unknown number of Canberra

Casualties and losses
Indian Claim: 1 C130 destroyed on ground; 2 F-104's destroyed on ground; 6 F-86's destroyed on ground; multiple F-86's damaged; 1 F-104 shot down; Sargodha airbase and satellite bases heavily damaged; Pakistani claim: 1 F-86 destroyed; 1 F-104 Shot down; No significant damage to Base facilities	Pakistani claim: 8 aircraft destroyed; Indian claim: 2 Hunters; 2 Mystères; 1 Mystère lost due to ground fire

The Sargodha airstrike was a key aerial operation of the Indo-Pakistani war of 1965, conducted by the Indian Air Force (IAF) in response to the Pathankot Airstrike. The strikes aimed at destroying multiple Pakistan Air Force (PAF) aircraft on the ground and neutralizing a crucial air-base. At that time, it was one of the largest strikes conducted by India.

== Background ==
=== 1965 Indo-Pakistani conflict ===
Following Operation Desert Hawk, the Pakistani military planners sought to use their qualitative modern weapon platforms to overrun Indian posts in the disputed region of Kashmir. It was also hoped to use this opportunity as India was busy re-building its armed forces following its losses during the Sino-Indian war of 1962. This effort culminated in Operation Gibraltar. However, the forces failed to provoke the Indian Kashmiri people to revolt, and the Indian Army promptly started to quash the infiltrating forces once it recognised that it was battling not insurgents, but regular Pakistani Army troops.

On 15 August 1965, Indian forces captured three hill positions that had been earlier occupied by Pakistan and were being used to disrupt traffic on the Srinagar – Leh Highway. During Operation Bakshi and Operation Faulad, Indian forces captured the strategic Haji Pir pass by 28 August. This forced the Pakistani forces to launch Operation Grand Slam on 1 September to reach Akhnoor and attempt to hold Indian forces at bay. Facing larger enemy forces, the Indian Army withdrew from their lightly defended positions in Kashmir and opened the Lahore front and mounted attacks inside Pakistani territory. Indian forces also began an advance to Sialkot. The IAF was given the role of supporting the army's objective.

=== Indian CAS flights ===
On 6 September alone, IAF flew thirty-one Mystère sorties from Pathankot and Adampur, sixteen Hunter sorties from Halwara and six Canberra sorties from Agra for both reconnaissance and close air support of the Indian Army operations in the Chhamb sector. In addition, fourteen Gnat and four MiG-21 air defence missions were also undertaken in areas where ground attack aircraft were operative. The IAF has claimed nine tanks, twelve heavy guns, four ack-ack guns, twenty-six vehicles and one military train as destroyed as a result of these strikes.

=== PAF airstrikes ===
The largest major Pakistani air offensive was undertaken after the Indian Army launched a counteroffensive into Pakistani Punjab province in the early morning of 6 September 1965, to relive Indian troops in Kashmir and to open up a larger font to combat. A large PAF air group destroyed the Pathankot airbase, used by the IAF to support army advances, though the attacks over Halwara were intercepted and shot down and those over Adampur were forced to turn back. The airbase was severely damaged and most aircraft at the base remained inoperable for the remainder of the conflict. The PAF claimed up to 13 IAF aircraft destroyed during this attack. The IAF reported that they lost a C-119, six Mystères, two MiG-21s and a Gnat damaged as a result of the strikes.

== Preparations ==
=== Location ===
Many disused airstrips in Pakistan had also been rehabilitated to be fitted with dummy aircraft, and were occasionally operating North American F-86 Sabres. Blast pens and dispersal sites were also built. From 1965, elements of the PAF's 17, 18, and 19 squadrons were based at the Sargodha airfield complex, which also housed the central command offices. This was considered one of the PAF's most heavily guarded locations, being dense with the assets of the air force. During peak operations, the complex housed up to 80 F-86 Sabres, and 5 Lockheed F-104 Starfighters. In addition, the base was also defended by 64 units of anti-air batteries.

The Sargodha complex consisted of four airfields. There was Sargodha (Main) with a satellite airfield, Chota Sargodha to the west, Wagowal to the north and Bhagtanwala to the east. The entire network of airfields were situated across the river Chenab, with the Kirana Hills rising to 1500 ft. to the south-east. The ETA over the target being 0530 hrs on September 7.

=== Planning ===
Although Indian Prime minister Lal Bahadur Shastri had asked Air Chief Marshal Arjan Singh to not launch any major aerial incursions to prevent the escalation of war, following the PAF strikes against Pathankot, Halwara and Adampur in the evening of 6 September 1965, where several IAF aircraft were lost on the ground, IAF High-command issued coded orders for authorising multiple strikes against the PAF on 7 September to the base commanders at Agra, Adampur and Halwara.

Instructors from the Air Force Flying College also joined the fight, creating the flying tactics for the fight. The IAF strike groups were to fly at treetop level to their maximum range and attack targets such as aircraft hangars, missile dumps,and a bulk petroleum installation at Sargodha. A secondary objective was also to take out a long range tracking radar on Sakesar Peak. IAF pilots were to fly the full mission without the lights of the runway during takeoff and without communication with Indian bases to avoid detection by PAF aircraft. The IAF command planned to conduct up to 33 sorties against the heavily guarded Sargodha Airfield Complex during the whole conflict.

Indian Intelligence pointed out to the presence of up to 30 F-86 Sabres, all upgraded to use AIM-9 Sidewinder missiles from the 5, 11 and 15 Squadrons PAF at Sargodha, in addition to multiple F-104 Starfighters. The intelligence reports indicated the constant presence of two to four CAP aircraft and multiple quad-M2 Browning and M23 anti-aircraft guns at the Sargodha Complex. The No.1 and No.32 Squadrons, equipped with Dassault Mystères were selected to attack the main base. No.8 squadron simultaneously attacked the air bases at Bhagatanwala in the vicinity.

== Air raids ==
On the night of 6 September, IAF Canberras from the No.5 Squadron departed Agra and conducted dive bombings runs from high-altitude. This attack did not cause much damage to PAF facilities. During the rapid scramble to intercept this flight, a Sabre crashed on takeoff from Mauripur. The Canberra squadron then went to provide cover fire for Indian Army positions. Just prior to takeoff of the main strike elements, a passing flight of PAF B-57s attempted to strike Adampur base, but no damage was caused and the aircraft from the base managed to takeoff for the morning airstrike. A near collision also occurred between the aircraft of Philip Rajkumar and A.B Devayya during the takeoff roll at 05:28.

Twelve aircraft from the No. 1 Squadron of Indian Air Force led by Wg. Cdr. O.P. Taneja attacked Chota Sargodha Airstrip early morning on 7 September. The previous day, the squadron had conducted strafing runs against a Pakistani supply train in Gujranwala. The First strike formation flew at an altitude of 300 feet for close to half an hour after flying into Pakistan. The aircraft arrived over Sargodha at 05:58 and began dive bombing at 30-second intervals. Navigation was done by compass and stop-watch, tough in the result, a formation of four aircraft were left behind over the Beas river.

They were followed by elements from the No.32 Squadron. The squadron claimed to have destroyed a C-130,and an F-104 Starfighter on the tarmac using SNEB rocket pods. Several F-86 Sabres were also claimed to be damaged in the airstrike. The remaining squadron pilots attacked the enclosed blast pens and aircraft hangars. Eight aircraft from the No. 8 Squadron IAF also attacked the nearby Bhagatanwala airstrip, though when they arrived over the target at 06:00, ground visibility was poor. PAF sources report no losses from this day.

On the return leg of the journey, Squadron Leader AB Devayya encountered a F-104 Starfighter, flown by Flight Lieutenant Amjad Hussain and both planes crashed after a fierce dogfight. During the battle, Devayya managed to score several cannon shots into Hussain's plane, after the latter attempted to slow down and out-turn the Mystère. While the Pakistani pilot ejected safely, Devayya could not. All aircraft constituting the early morning raid returned except for Devayya. During the mission debrief, the squadron was re-armed with further weapons to conduct a late morning strike at 09:45 AM.

At 06:15 AM, five Hunters armed with T-10 Rockets from No. 27 Squadron of Indian Air Force launch on a mission to strike Chota Sargodha Airstrip. However, this raid mistakenly attacked the nearby Wagowal satellite base and claimed to have destroyed two F-86 Sabres on the ground. Sqn Ldr D.S. Jog led the raid, with Sqn Ldr O.N. Kacker, Flight Lieutenant T.K. Chauduri and Flying Officer P.S. Parihar and Flight Lieutenant D.N. Rathore.The squadron also managed to strike the runway of Sargodha Main airfield. The flight managed to ward off Sqn Ldr MM Alam and Flt Lt Masood Akhtar, who intercepted them following the strike, though Kacker's aircraft was hit by fire, forcing him to eject. A second raid followed the main group and No. 7 Squadron IAF was deployed to attack Chota Sargodha Airstrip. This formation was pounced upon by four Sabres and a Starfighter, with the two escort Hunters crewed by Sqn Ldr S.B. Bhagwat and Flying Officer J.S. Brar shot down by M.M Alam over Kirana hills. The other three aircraft in the formation headed back to Halwara without further losses. During this combat, Alam claimed victory over four Hunters in 30 seconds in addition to shooting down another Hunter. This claim however is disputed, as the IAF denies losing the Hunter element and no verification was conducted by Pakistani authorities.

At 09:45 AM, six Mystères from the No. 1 Squadron IAF led by Sqn. Ldr. Sudharshan Handa and followed by F/L D.S. Brar, F/L D.S. Khaki and F/L Philip Rajkumar launched and attacked Sargodha Main, at 10:15 claiming to have left over seven aircraft destroyed or burning. Using their cannons, SNEB Rockets and 1,000 pound bombs, they engaged fuel storage facilities, ATC towers and three Sabres and a Starfighter on operational readiness. This flight did not suffer any casualties and claimed to have destroyed three Sabres and another Starfighter in a followup strike, though Pakistan only reported the loss of a Sabre and limited infrastructure damage. The flight was authorised as a four-plane formation was unable to navigate and join the main strike-force for the early-morning raid. These four fighters had returned after a futile attempt to spot Sargodha and would strike targets in Sargodha that were initially missed due to poor visibility in the morning. The squadron also hit a railway line in the approach to Sargodha. As the squadron was returning, IAF Ack-Ack units over Amritsar mistook this flight as an oncoming Sabre attack and opened fire briefly. However, none of the aircraft were hit and the flight landed safely in Adampur, with less than three minutes of fuel left.

At 3:40 PM, the last raid was launched with two Mystères from No. 27 attacking, before being noticed by Sabres on patrol. The No.1 squadron would also join the final raid of the day, though aborted their mission after being spotted, and consequently fired their weapons into aircraft hangars. Flight Lt B Guha was killed in action later in the evening raid, being shot down by a sidewinder missile.

== Casualties ==
The Indian strike forces lost two Hunters and two Mystères during the combat operations and another to Ack-Ack fire. A PAF starfighter was also brought down. The PAF claimed that ten aircraft were shot down. The PAF lost two aircraft as a result of the raid, one F-86 on ground and a F-104 in the air. There were no reported PAF casualties either on ground or air. There were four Indian casualties: Sqn Ldr A.B Devayya, Fg Off Jagdev Singh Brar, Sqn Ldr S.B. Bhagwat, and Fg Off B. Guha. Sqn Ldr Onkar Nath Kacker, ejected and was taken POW and released after the war.

== Aftermath ==
Shortly after the 3:40 PM raid, the counter-air offensive attacks on Sargodha finally stopped. The Indian Air Force claimed to have destroyed around 15 aircraft of the Pakistan Air Force. In addition, other IAF squadrons were also engaged in combat over Peshawar, with the Raiwind railway yard and a train was destroyed and Pakistani armoured columns at Kasur, Siakot and Chamb were also met by IAF CAS flights. The IAF Squadrons involved in the raid would also participate at the Battle of Khem Karan, where they would cause heavy casualties in the Pakistani Tank regiments before the Battle of Asal Uttar.

On the same day, the PAF began counter-air offensives on northern and eastern airfields in India. A formation of four Sabres attacked the Srinagar airfield, which was not defended by IAF Fighter aircraft under a 1948 peace treaty. A DC-3 and a Canadian DHC-4 aircraft used by the United Nations were rendered unserviceable by the raid. Another PAF retaliatory raid over Kalaikunda in the eastern sector resulted in four IAF Vampires destroyed and two Canberra being damaged. Indian CAP aircraft proceeded to engage the strike group, with F/L A. T. Cooke shooting one down and damaging a second.

IAF Canberra's continued to raid Sargodha and Chaklala at night, flying 200 counter air and interdiction missions against these and other Pakistani bases, including those at Akwal, Peshawar, Kohat, Chak, Jhumra and Risalwala until the ceasefire. A night raid was conducted when the No. 16 Squadron IAF deployed five Canberras on 16th September. The leading aircraft approached at approximately 500 ft AGL, dropping two 1,000-lb Target Indicating Bombs. Following the target marking, the other four aircraft then dropped six 1,000-lb bombs each. The IAF only lost a single Canberra, brought down by a Sidewinder missile on 21 September during these bombing raids. Further strikes were also conducted by Canberra and Hunter formations over Sargodha during the 1971 Indo-Pakistani war.

Indian sources claimed that following the action, Pakistan parachuted 135 Special Services Group (SSG) commandos led by Major Khalid Butt at three Indian airfields (Halwara, Pathankot and Adampur) on 7 September. However, most troops missed their landing point and local villagers caught and handed them over to police forces.The attempt was called an "unmitigated disaster" by P.C Lal, with only ten commandos successfully returning to Pakistan. Air superiority was not achieved during the entire conflict by either side.

Two IAF aircraft would use long-range missiles to strike Sargodha during the 2025 India-Pakistan conflict, with both missiles impacting and disabling the airbase's runway.

== Commendations ==
During the conflict, the IAF was awarded a total three Maha Vir Chakras and forty-three Vir Chakras.

- Sqn Ldr Ajjamada B. Devaiah Mahavir Chakra (p)
- Wg, Cdr Prem Pal Singh - Maha Vir Chakra
- Wg. Cdr. O.P. Taneja - Vir Chakra
- Sqn Ldr Madhukar Shantaram Jatar - Vir Chakra
- Sqn Ldr Sudarshan Handa - Vir Chakra
- Flt Lt Alfred Cooke - Vir Chakra
- Fg Offr Mamgain - Vir Chakra
- Flt Lt Phillip Rajakumar Mentioned in despatches

== In popular culture ==
In 2026, a film titled Sky Force was released, portraying the strike led by the 1st Squadron (Tigers) over Sargodha.

== See also ==
- Pathankot Airstrike
- Indo-Pakistani air war of 1965
- Indo-Pakistani air war of 1971
