= Om Prakash Taneja =

Indian Air Force officer

Group Captain Om Prakash Taneja VrC
- Born: 21 March 1929
- Died: 22 July 2017 (aged 88); New Jersey
- Military career
- Allegiance: India
- Branch: Indian Air Force
- Service years: 25 years (15 April 1950 to 31 August 1975)
- Rank: Group captain
- Service number: 3843 F(P) (Orig: GD(P))
- Units: No.1 Squadron Tigers; No.3 Squadron Cobras; No.8 Squadron Eight Pursoots
- Conflicts: Indo-Pakistani War of 1965
- Awards: Vir Chakra

Om Prakash Taneja (21 March 1929 - 22 July 2017) was an Indian Air Force (IAF) officer and fighter pilot, known for leading India's first aerial bombing of an ammunition train as well as the attack on the Sargodha airfield, both during the Indo-Pakistani War of 1965. As squadron leader of No. 1 Squadron IAF, he guided Mystère pilots to victory on 6 and 7 September 1965. For this action, he was awarded the Vir Chakra. He retired from the IAF in August 1975 at the rank of group captain.

== Wartime service ==
=== 1965 ===
On September 5, 1965, Pakistan claimed air superiority by bombing airfields. In response, he led No. 1 Squadron IAF of the Indian Air Force, equipped with Dassault Mystère IV aircraft, struck fuel wagons in the Gujranwala sector on September 6, 1965. The next day, he led a 13-plane air raid on Sargodha airfield destroying four F-86F, three F-104 and 2 Lockheed C-130 Hercules transports planes in the airfield, while PAF claimed five victories. Among the downed aircraft was Ajjamada B. Devaiah's, the 13th plane, which successfully engaged and destroyed a Starfighter on September 7, 1965.

== Popular culture ==
- The 2025 film, Sky Force, is based on the attack of Sargodha Airfield Complex on 7 September 1965 by 13-aircraft contingent led by Akshay Kumar portrayed as Group Captain O.P Taneja, Veer Pahariya played Devayya, whose character is named T.K Vijaya, while Sara Ali Khan will appear as his wife, Geeta Vijaya.
