= Leslie Cunningham =

Leslie Cunningham may refer to:

- L. B. C. Cunningham, Scottish scientist
- Les Cunningham, Canadian ice hockey player
