= Harcharan Singh Mangat =

Indian Air Force Officer (1932–1988)

Air Commodore Harcharan Singh Mangat MVC
- Born: 6 June 1932; Ludhiana, British India
- Died: 14 July 1988 (aged 56) near the Vaishno Devi Temple, Jammu and Kashmir
- Military career
- Allegiance: India
- Branch: Indian Air Force
- Service years: 1954–1986
- Rank: Air Commodore
- Unit: No. 32 Squadron IAF
- Commands: No. 32 Squadron IAF
- Conflicts: Indo-Pakistani War of 1965; Indo-Pakistani War of 1971
- Awards: Maha Vir Chakra

Air Commodore Harcharan Singh Mangat, MVC (6 June 1932 – 14 July 1988) was an Indian officer of the Indian Air Force, who participated in the Indo-Pakistani War of 1971 for which he was awarded the Maha Vir Chakra, India's second highest military award.

== Early life ==
Air Commodore Harcharan Singh Mangat was born on 6 June 1932 in Ludhiana, India. His father's name was Shri Ram Singh Mangat.

== Military career ==
During the Indo-Pakistani War of 1971 in the western sector, Wing Commander Harcharan Singh Mangat was commanding officer of the No. 32 Squadron IAF, an Operational Bomber Squadron, operating Sukhoi Su-7 aircraft. Wing Commander Harcharan Singh Mangat undertook a number of interdiction, close support missions and photographic reconnaissance missions. The information brought by him was used in the operational planning and success of Indian Army and the Indian Air Force operations.

For gallantry, professional skills and leadership of the high order, he was awarded India's second highest military award, the Maha Vir Chakra

He later rose to the rank of Air Commodore before retiring. He died in a Helicopter crash on 14 July 1988, at the age of 56.
