= Sky Force (film) =

2025 Indian film by Sandeep Kewlani and Abhishek Anil Kapur

- Theatrical release poster
- Directed by: Sandeep Kewlani; Abhishek Anil Kapur
- Written by: Sandeep Kewlani; Aamil Keeyan Khan; Carl Austin; Niren Bhatt
- Produced by: Jyoti Deshpande; Amar Kaushik Bhaumik Gondaliya; Dinesh Vijan
- Starring: Akshay Kumar; Nimrat Kaur; Veer Pahariya; Sara Ali Khan
- Cinematography: Santhana Krishnan Ravichandran
- Edited by: A. Sreekar Prasad
- Music by: Songs: Tanishk Bagchi; Score: Justin Varghese
- Production companies: Prime Focus Studios; Jio Studios; Maddock Films; Leo Films
- Distributed by: PVR Inox Pictures
- Release date: 24 January 2025
- Running time: 125 minutes
- Country: India
- Language: Hindi
- Budget: ₹160 crore
- Box office: est. ₹168.88 crore

Sky Force is a 2025 Indian Hindi-language war drama film centred around India's first airstrike at the Sargodha airbase of Pakistan in the Indo-Pakistani air war of 1965. The film stars Akshay Kumar, Nimrat Kaur, debutant Veer Pahariya, and Sara Ali Khan. Directed by debutants Sandeep Kewlani and Abhishek Anil Kapur, and produced by Maddock Films and Jio Studios, it is written by Kewlani, Aamil Keeyan Khan, Carl Austin and Niren Bhatt.

Officially announced in October 2023, Sky Force began filming in May 2023 in Mumbai. The principal photography wrapped up in late-April 2024, spanning 100 days, with shooting held in parts of India and the UK.

Sky Force was theatrically released on 24 January 2025, coinciding with the Republic Day weekend, and received generally positive reviews from critics though it had an average box office run.

== Plot ==
In 1971, the Pakistan Air Force suddenly attacks an Indian airbase due to the Kashmir conflict. In retaliation, the Indian Air Force captures a Pakistani pilot, Ahmed. Upon interrogating him, Group Captain K. O. Ahuja discovers that he was awarded for killing an Indian officer in the 1965 war.

In 1965, Ahuja and his teammates, including T. K. Vijaya, are flying for Tiger Squadron at the Adampur Airbase. Vijaya, a.k.a. Tabby, always gets into trouble with his seniors for breaking protocols; nonetheless, he is a skilled and patriotic pilot. He shares a close bond with Ahuja, as he considers him his mentor, while Ahuja sees his late brother Monu in Vijaya. Ahuja's senior, David Lawrence, informs him that the United States has strengthened Pakistan by supplying them with 12 Star Striker fighter planes. Upon receiving confidential information about a possible attack from Pakistan, David instructs Ahuja to go on a recce mission along with another officer and cross the border at his own risk. During the recce, Ahuja and Tabby discover several weapons and artillery pieces at a railhead on the Pakistan border. Despite being noticed by Pakistani officers, Tabby photographs the weapons.

After analysing the pictures, Ahuja suggests that India should attack before Pakistan can execute its plan. However, their commanding officer, Lawrence, dismisses the idea, as the government would not agree with India attacking first due to concerns over human rights. Soon afterwards, Pakistan attacks the Indian airbase at night, knowing that India does not have any aircraft capable of fighting at night. They destroy the airbase, the stationed fighter planes, and kill Indian soldiers. In retaliation, the Indian government decides upon a counterattack to destroy Pakistan's key airbases and its Star Striker planes. While strategising, Ahuja learns from a speech by the Pakistani PM that the Star Striker planes are stationed in the central part of the country, at the Sargodha Airbase. The mission is named "Sky Force".

The mission proves difficult for India, as the existing aircraft do not have the fuel capacity to return to Adampur after attacking Sargodha. Ahuja assembles three teams for the mission, but on Lawrence's orders, he keeps Tabby on standby rather than including him as part of the three core teams. The mission is accomplished, and all the officers return to their bases. Upon returning, Ahuja learns that Tabby took off a few minutes after his designated time and has gone missing. The Indian government turns a blind eye to finding Tabby, labelling him rebellious for disobeying orders. Meanwhile, Tabby's wife, Geeta, urges Ahuja to find him, as he had earlier promised her that he would take care of Tabby as his younger brother. Despite his best efforts, he receives no support from the government, which attempts to portray his disappearance as his own fault.

In the present day, in 1971, after several years, Ahuja is guilt-ridden over failing to keep his promise to Geeta and losing another brother in a war. While all the soldiers involved in the mission received the Vir Chakra, the authorities exclude Tabby despite his contributions to the mission. Heartbroken, Ahuja removes his Vir Chakra and places it on Tabby's portrait. After interrogating Ahmed, he comes closer to locating Tabby, but receives no support from the government to continue the investigation.

Twenty years later, a retired Group Captain Ahuja receives a parcel from Ahmed containing a book about the Indo-Pakistani war of 1965. With further evidence, he successfully reopens the case and even becomes part of the investigating team. They travel across the world to question several people and finally meet Ahmed in Pakistan, who tells them the true story. He recalls having the greatest dogfight of his life with an unknown Indian pilot, who evaded American technology and survived two missile attacks. He reveals that the unknown pilot was Tabby, whom he had presumed dead after the first missile launch. However, through his skill and bravery, Tabby shoots down Ahmed's aircraft at the cost of his own life and dies in Pakistani territory. After proof of his bravery is presented, Tabby is posthumously awarded the Maha Vir Chakra, becoming the only Indian Air Force officer to receive the honour posthumously.

== Cast ==
- Akshay Kumar as Wing Commander Kumar Om Ahuja (fictionalisation of Om Prakash Taneja VrC)
- Veer Pahariya as T. Krishna Vijaya "Tabby" (fictionalisation of Ajjamada Boppayya Devayya MVC)
  - Maahir Raghuvanshi as young Tabby
- Sara Ali Khan as Geeta Vijaya
- Nimrat Kaur as Preeti Ahuja
- Sharad Kelkar as Ahmed Hussain (fictionalisation of Squadron Leader Amjad Hussain)
- Mohit Chauhan as Air Chief Marshal Arjun Sinha (fictionalisation of Air Chief Marshal Arjan Singh)
- Manish Choudhary as Air Commodore David Lawrence
- Varun Badola as Air Vice Marshal Amit Narang
- Virendra Singh Patyal as Servant of Air Chief Marshal Arjun Sinha
- Anupam Joardar as Sarvepalli Radhakrishnan, President of India
- Jaywant Wadkar as Defence Minister Yashwantrao Chavan
- Soham Majumdar as Debashish "Cockroach" Chatterjee
- Abhinav Bhattacharjee as Amod Pandit
- Ritik Ghanshani as Prakash "Panther" Rajput
- Lakshay Kheterpal as Faisal Ali
- Bryan Lawrence as George Red
- Tim Hudson as John Peterson, author of Battle for Pakistan, The Air War of 1965 (fictionalisation of John Fricker)
- Rajat Kaul as Balvinder Singh Sandhu "Bull"
- Fayaz Khan as Tiger Squadron Pilot "Duck"
- Karan Chaudhary as Tiger Squadron Pilot "Goat"
- Ramakrishna Dixit as Tiger Squadron Pilot "Rhino"
- Ankit Kaushik as Tiger Squadron Pilot "Owl"
- Sagar Rana as Tiger Squadron Pilot "Scorpio"
- Vishal Jinwal as Tiger Squadron Pilot "Shark"
- Lakshay Chawla as Tiger Squadron Pilot "Spider"
- Abhishek Mahendra as Tiger Squadron Pilot "Fox"
- Lal Bahadur Shastri as himself (archival footage)

== Production ==
The film first came into development in June 2022, with pre-production done by March 2023. The film was officially announced on 2 October 2023, on the occasion of Gandhi Jayanti. The film is inspired by India's retaliatory attack on Pakistan's Sargodha airbase in the Indo-Pakistani air war of 1965.

=== Filming ===
Principal photography began on 31 May 2023 in Mumbai. Filming moved to Lucknow in August 2023. The shooting was officially wrapped up on 26 April 2024.

The film was shot over a period of 100 days (including 60 days for Akshay Kumar) in locations such as Mumbai, Lucknow, Sitapur, Amritsar, Hyderabad, Delhi, Pathankot and United Kingdom. A special song involving Veer Pahariya and Sara Ali Khan was shot in Mussoorie. Filming including patchwork concluded on 17 December 2024.

Notably, Akshay Kumar had previously collaborated with Jio Studios and Maddock Films on a surprise appearance in producer Amar Kaushik's directorial venture Stree 2 (2024), also produced by Maddock founder Dinesh Vijan and Jio Studios CEO Jyoti Deshpande.

== Soundtrack ==
Sky Force

Soundtrack album by Tanishk Bagchi
- Released: 28 January 2025
- Genre: Feature film soundtrack
- Length: 21:48
- Language: Hindi
- Label: Saregama

Tanishk Bagchi chronology
Bhool Bhulaiyaa 3 (2024)	Sky Force (2025)	Loveyapa (2025)
External audio
- Audio Jukebox on YouTube

The songs of the film are composed by Tanishk Bagchi which marks his debut as a solo composer while the background score is composed by Justin Varghese. The lyrics are written by Irshad Kamil, Manoj Muntashir and Shloke Lal. The first single titled "Maaye" was released on 8 January 2025. The second and third and fourth single titled "Kya Meri Yaad Aati Hai" and "Aankhon Mein Base Ho Tum" and "Maine Dil Se Poochha" was released on 11 January 2024. The third single titled "Rang" was released on 17 January 2025. The 1963 Lata Mangeshkar song "Ae Mere Watan Ke Logon" is used for an emotional tribute to India's soldiers. The fifth single "Tu Hain Toh Main Hoon" was released on 22 January 2025.

Track listing
No.	Title	Lyrics	Singer(s)	Length
1.	"Maaye"	Manoj Muntashir	B Praak	4:50
2.	"Tu Hain Toh Main Hoon"	Irshad Kamil	Arijit Singh, Afsana Khan	4:08
3.	"Rang"	Shloke Lal	Satinder Sartaaj, Zahrah S. Khan	3:42
4.	"Kya Meri Yaad Aati Hai"	Irshad Kamil	Vishal Mishra	4:15
5.	"Ae Mere Watan Ke Logon"	Kavi Pradeep	Lata Mangeshkar	4:53
Total length:				21:48

== Release ==
=== Theatrical ===
Initially planned to release on 2 October 2024, Sky Force was later theatrically released on 24 January 2025 in IMAX, 4DX, D-Box and ICE formats.

=== Home media ===
The film began streaming on Amazon Prime Video from 21 March 2025.

== Reception ==
=== Critical response ===
Ganesh Aaglave of the Firstpost rated the film 4/5 stars and opined "Sky Force will leave you with goosebumps, a lump in your throat, and maybe even a few tears in your eyes. Right from the action sequences to emotional moments, every frame strikes a chord with the audience. The film brings to life a tale of courage, sacrifice, and unwavering patriotism." Sarika Sharma of Moneycontrol rated the film 4/5 stars and noted "Akshay Kumar and debutant Veer Pahariya pass with flying colours in this patriotic film which has released well on time ahead of Republic Day. It is a must watch this weekend." Dhaval Roy of The Times of India rated the film 3.5/5 stars out of 5 and wrote "Sky Force stands out for its balanced portrayal of patriotism, avoiding overt sensationalism or antagonism. The film is a fitting tribute, making it a must-watch for those who are drawn to war dramas that blend action with heartfelt storytelling. A few bumps in the narrative aside, it's a cinematic flight worth boarding."

Anuj Kumar of The Hindu reviewed the film and highlighted "Skewed storytelling prevents this fictionalised retelling of the feat of a war hero from hitting the horizon". Risabh Suri of the Hindustan Times reviewed the film and noted "Akshay Kumar's measured act balances vulnerability and toughness, elevating this emotional war film. Overall, Sky Force is a well-made film that leaves you pondering what makes our soldiers so selfless." Nandini Ramnath of Scroll.in reviewed the film and highlighted "Unfortunately, what should have been jettisoned, like fuel during an emergency, is what constitutes the bulk of the plot. By flying into different directions at the same time, Sky Force does itself a disservice."

Sky Force received 3 out of 5 stars from Vineeta Kumar of India Today. Kumar praised the film's restrained approach to jingoism, instead focusing on the story of an unsung war hero. Saibal Chatterjee of NDTV rated the film 2.5 stars out of 5 and wrote "It isn't as punishingly long as such action films usually are. The heightened rendition of true events works only intermittently. It loses its way in a surfeit of computer-generated air combat sequences." He also mentioned although Sky Force is patchy, the acting is adequate. Shubhra Gupta of The Indian Express rated the film 2.5 out of 5 stars and opined "Sky Force, coasting on the same elements as Fighter, except this one is a thinly-disguised account of a real life incident during the 1965 Indo-Pak conflict." She praised the minimal use of jingoism, the background score and Pahariya's debut.

=== Box office ===
The film concluded its box-office run with its worldwide gross estimated to be ₹168.88 crore. It was declared as an average fair at box office

== Controversies ==
The film was banned across several Arab countries in the Persian Gulf region, including the U.A.E., Saudi Arabia, Qatar and Oman.

Some in the Kodava community have disapproved of the misrepresentation of Ajjamada B. Devaiah as Tamil in the film considering him being a 'South Indian'.

== See also ==
- Pathankot airstrike
- Sargodha airstrike
