= Dilawar Hussain =

Dilawar Hussain may refer to:

- Dilawar Hussain (cricketer)
- Dilawar Hussain (air marshal)
- Dilawar Hussain (field hockey)
