= Windage =

Air resistance on an object

In aerodynamics, firearms ballistics, and automobiles, windage is the effects of some fluid, usually air (e.g., wind) and sometimes liquids, such as oil.

== Aerodynamics ==
Windage is a force created on an object by friction when there is relative movement between air and the object. Windage loss is the reduction in efficiency due to windage forces.

For example, electric motors are affected by friction between the rotor and air. Large alternators have significant losses due to windage. To reduce losses, hydrogen gas may be used, since it is less dense.

Causes of windage are:

- The object is moving and being slowed by resistance from the air.
- A wind is blowing, producing a force on the object.

The term can refer to:

- The effect of the force, for example the deflection of a missile or an aircraft by a cross wind.
- The area and shape of the object that make it susceptible to friction, for example those parts of a boat that are exposed to the wind.

Aerodynamic streamlining can be used to reduce windage.

Hydrodynamic drag is a hydrodynamic effect similar to windage.

== Ballistics ==
In firearms parlance, windage is the sight adjustment used to compensate for the horizontal deviation of the projectile trajectory from the intended point of impact due to wind drift or Coriolis effect. By contrast, the adjustment for the vertical deviation is the elevation.

Colloquially, "Kentucky windage" is the practice of holding the aim to the upwind side of the target (also known as deflection shooting or "leading" the wind) to compensate for wind drift, without actually changing the existing adjustment settings on the gunsight.

In muzzleloading firearms, windage is the difference in diameter between the bore and the ball, especially in muskets and cannons. The bore gap allows the shot to be loaded quickly but reduces the efficiency of the weapon's internal ballistics, as it allows gas to leak past the projectile. It also reduces the accuracy, as the ball takes a zig-zag path along the barrel, emerging out of the muzzle at an unpredictable angle.

== Automobiles ==
In automotive parlance, windage is parasitic drag on the crankshaft due to sump oil splashing on the crank train during rough driving. It can also be dissipating energy in turbulence from the crank train moving the crankcase gas and oil mist at high RPM. Windage may also inhibit the migration of oil into the sump and back to the oil pump, creating lubrication problems. Some manufacturers and aftermarket vendors have developed special scrapers to remove excess oil from the counterweights and windage screens to create a barrier between the crankshaft and oil sump. Windage is eliminated in dry sump designs.

== See also ==
- Deflection (ballistics)
- Drag (physics)
