= Constantin Rozanoff =

French test pilot and Air Force colonel

Constantin Wladimir Rozanoff
- Born: 23 August 1905; Warsaw, Vistula Land, Russian Empire
- Died: 3 April 1954 (aged 48); Melun, France
- Military career
- Allegiance: France
- Service years: 1940–1946
- Rank: Colonel
- Nickname: Kostia
- Units: GC II/4, GC 2/5 «Lafayette», GC 2/3 «Dauphiné»
- Conflicts: World War II
- Awards: Air Medal, Légion d'honneur

Constantin Wladimir Rozanoff, also known as Kostia Rozanoff, (Russian: Розанов, Константин Владимирович; 23 August 1905 – 3 April 1954) was a French test pilot, a colonel of the French Air Force, and one of the pioneers of jet aviation. He was the chief test pilot at Dassault Aviation. He flew 201 types of planes and helicopters while logging 5,000 flying hours, including 3,865 combat hours. He also broke the sound barrier 104 times.

== Early life ==
Constantin Rozanoff was born to a Russian family in Warsaw. He and his mother emigrated to France in 1917 because of the Russian Revolution and in 1927 he obtained French citizenship. Rozanoff entered the engineering school École Centrale Paris, where he graduated in 1928. Called into military service the same year, he completed his service with the 34th Aviation Regiment of observation at Le Bourget as a reserve officer in the commune of Avord.

He attended the SUPAERO National Aircraft School (L'École nationale supérieure de l'aéronautique et de l'espace) in 1933, and after completing studies he became a licensed pilot. In 1935 he became a pilot with the Center of Aeronautics in Villacoublay (Centre d'Essais des Matériels Aéronautiques - CEMA) and took part in flight testing of the Morane-Saulnier MS.406, Dewoitine D.520 and Bloch MB.152. In October 1937, Rozanoff was almost killed when losing control of a Hanriot while testing its spin characteristics. He could not recover the plane from its spin in time to avoid a crash, but he bailed out of the aircraft successfully.

== War Service ==
In February 1940 Rozanoff became second in command of Groupe de chasse GC II/4 and flew operations in the Battle of France. In May 1940 he shot down two Luftwaffe fighter planes while flying a Curtiss P-36.
After the Nazi occupation of France began in 1942, he travelled to Morocco where he participated in operations with the Allies in Tunis and Algeria, and on convoy operations over the Mediterranean flying the Curtiss P-40 (with onboard sign ‘MadKot’). He commanded GC 2/5 («Lafayette») and GC 2/3 («Dauphiné»).

In December 1943 Rozanoff immigrated to the United Kingdom where he was promoted to lieutenant colonel and attended additional test pilot courses, including one at the Central Flying School. During this time, Rozanoff flew the first Royal Air Force jet, the Gloster G-41, and participated in testing the P-59 Airacomet and the Lockheed P-80 Shooting Star in the United States.

== Postwar ==
In December 1945, Rozanoff returned from the US as a Colonel. He served at Airbase 118 in Mont-de-Marsan, which was later named after him.

He was demobilised in October 1946 and headed the Test Division of the Dassault Aviation (as chief pilot). Colonel Rozanoff became the chief test pilot flying the MD-450 Ouragan and participated in testing military transport planes such as the Dassault MD.315 Flamant, and the fighter-bomber Mystère (I-IV).

Rozanoff became the first Frenchman to break the sound barrier in level flight, on 24 February 1954, with the Mystère IV B.

In 1954 Constantin Rozanoff published his autobiographical- Double Bang - Ma Vie de Pilote d'Essai.

Later, same year, Colonel Rozanoff was killed in a crash of a Mystère IV B during a public low-level flight over the Melun Villaroche Aerodrome.

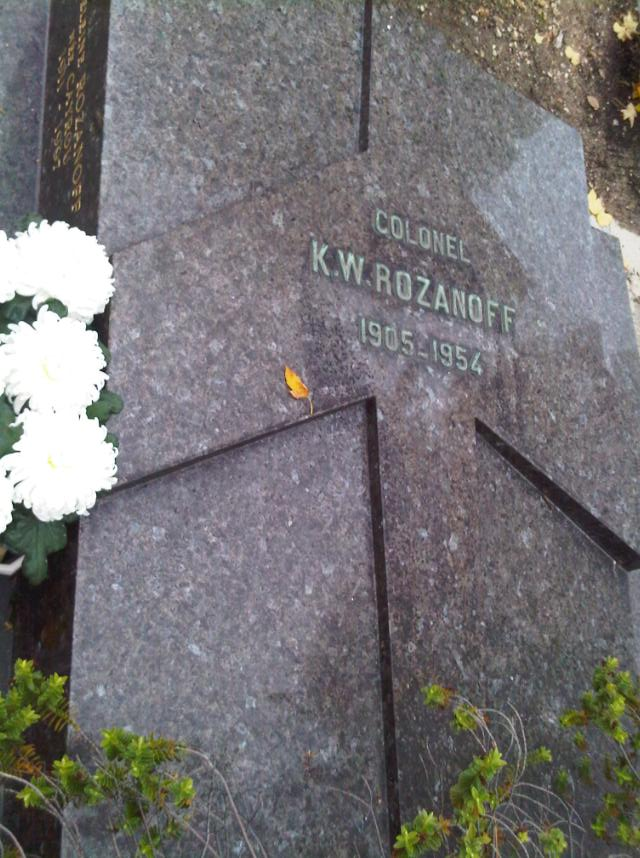
Rozanoff's tomb in the Passy Cemetery, Paris.

He was buried in the Passy Cemetery.

He was awarded the Air Medal and the cross of the Légion d'honneur.
