= Gyro gunsight =

Gunsight in which target lead and bullet drop are calculated automatically

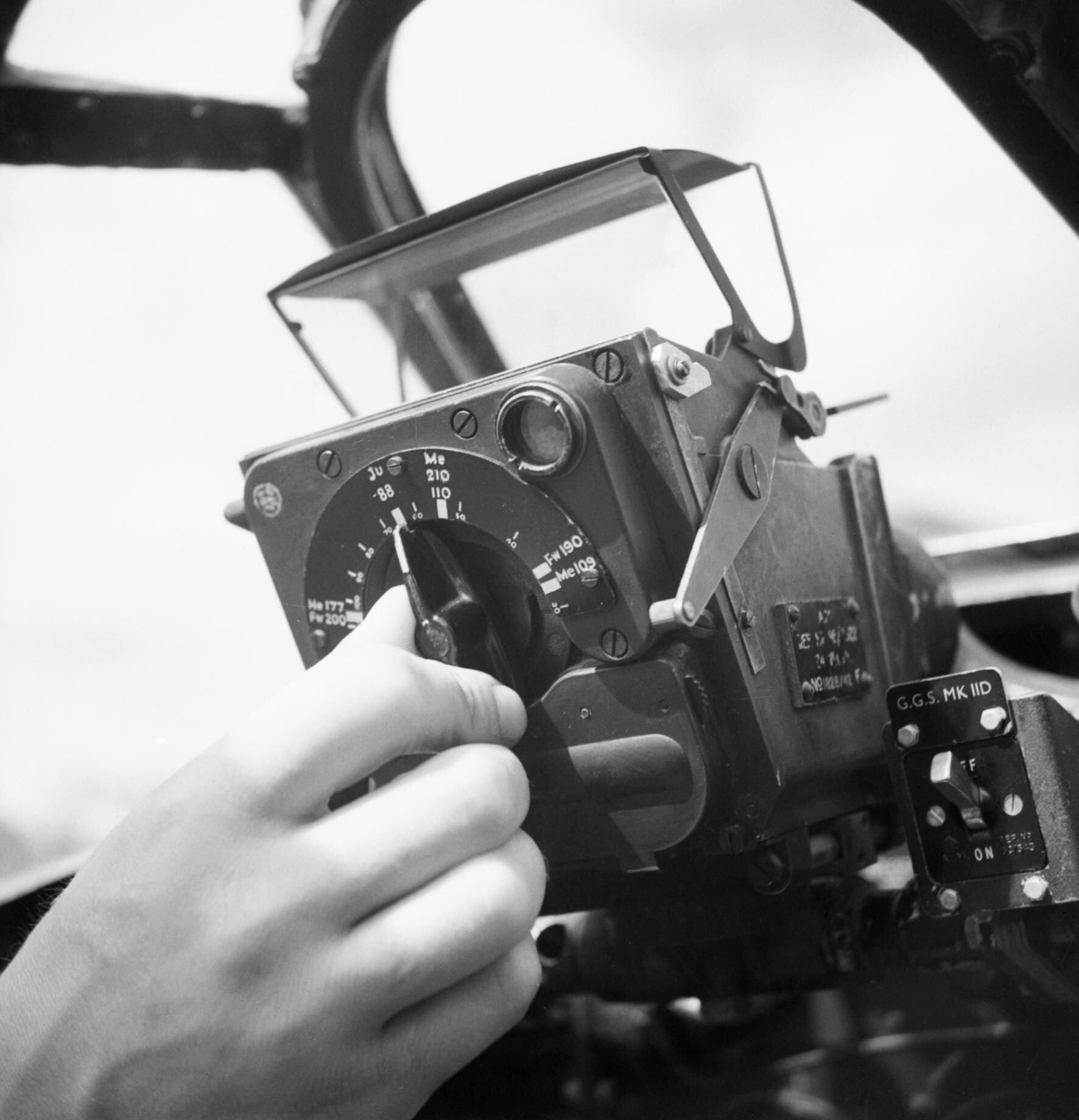
The instrument panel of a Spitfire IX showing the Mk IID Gyro reflector gunsight. To set range the dial adjusts the reticle size to match target wingspan. Currently set to the Junkers Ju 88, it ranged in size from the large Fw 200 Condor to the small Messerschmitt Bf 109.

A gyro gunsight (G.G.S.) is a modification of the non-magnifying reflector sight in which target lead (the amount of aim-off in front of a moving target) and bullet drop are calculated automatically. The first examples were developed in Britain just before the Second World War for use during aerial combat, and more advanced models were common on Allied aircraft by the end of the war.

The amount of lead required to hit a target is a function of the rate of turn of the attacking aircraft and the range to the target. The former is measured using a gyroscope in the sight, while the latter is estimated by the pilot by moving a dial or pointer so that a reticle in the sight matches the wingspan of the target. Post-war models added a small radar to automate the range measurement; these are known as radar gunsights.

Gyro sights usually contained more than one reticle to assist in proper aiming: a fixed one, often just a dot, signifying the direction the guns are pointing, a moving one showing the corrected aiming point, and a ring to match to a target plane's known wingspan. A particularly advanced model, the K-14 found in the North American P-51 Mustang, had separate projectors and displays for air and ground attacks.

== History ==
In 1936 Royal Aircraft Establishment scientist Leslie Bennet Craigie Cunningham suggested using a gyroscope's resistance to rotation to modify the aiming point in a gun sight to compensate for deflection caused by a turning aircraft. This arrangement meant the information presented to the pilot was of his own aircraft, that is the deflection/lead calculated was based on his own bank-level, rate of turn, airspeed etc. The assumption was that the flight path was following the flight path of the target aircraft, as in a dogfight, therefore the input data was accurate enough to provide useful output data to the pilot.

=== British developments ===
==== Mark I ====
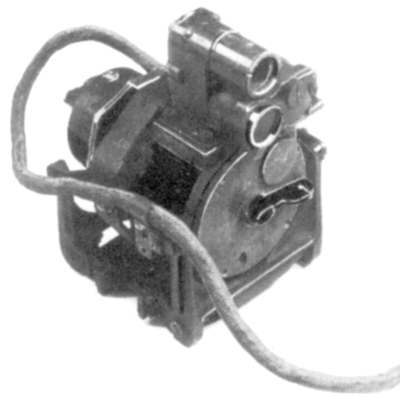
The Ferranti Gyro Sight Mk I. The pilot/gunner had to look into the narrow field folded prismatic telescopic sight at the top of the device, a drawback corrected in the later Mark II.

After tests with two experimental gyro gunsights which had begun in 1939, the first production gyro gunsight was the British Mark I Gyro Sight, developed at Farnborough in 1941. To save time in development the sight was based on the already existing type G prismatic sight, basically a telescopic gun sight folded into a shorter length by a series of prisms. Prototypes were tested in a Supermarine Spitfire and the turret of a Boulton Paul Defiant in the early part of that year. With the successful conclusion of these tests the sight was put into production by Ferranti, the first limited-production versions being available by the spring of 1941, with the sights being first used operationally against Luftwaffe raids on Britain in July the same year. The Mark I sight had a number of drawbacks, however, including a limited field of view, erratic behaviour of the reticle, and requiring the pilot/gunner to put their eye up against an eyepiece during violent manoeuvres.

==== Mark II ====
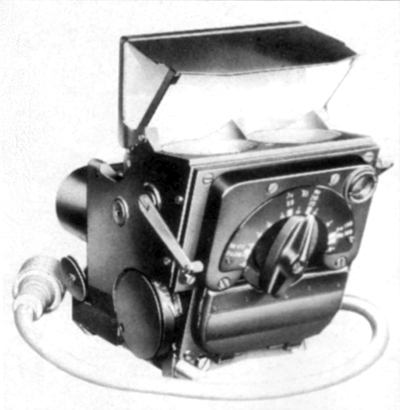
The Ferranti Gyro Sight Mk IIc

Production of the Mark I was postponed and work started on an improved sight. Changes involved incorporating the gyro adjusted reticle into a more standard reflector sight system, a non-magnifying optical sight that had been in use since 1918. Reflector sights consisting of a 45-degree angle glass beam splitter that sat in front of the pilot and projected an illuminated image of an aiming reticle that appeared to sit out in front of the pilot's field of view at infinity and was perfectly aligned with the plane's guns ("boresighted" with the guns). The sight sat some distance away from the pilot, so it was safer to use and didn't impair the pilot's field of view. The optical nature of the reflector sight meant it was possible to feed other information into field of view. In the reflector sight version, range was measured by comparing the wingspan of the target seen through the sight to a pre-set number. The pre-set number was selected via a large dial on the front of the sight, and the range was then measured by turning another dial on the aircraft's throttle. This new sight became the Mark II Gyro Sight and was first tested in late 1943 with production examples becoming available later in the same year. Ferranti built a new factory in the Crewe Toll area of Edinburgh, Scotland to build the sights. This factory would later go on to be the centre for Ferranti's long history in radar development.

The Mark II was also subsequently produced in the US by Sperry as the K-14 (USAAF) and Mk18 (Navy). The K-14 included two projector systems for the reflector sight, one with gyro correction for attacking aircraft, and a second for attacking ground targets. It was otherwise similar to the British models, although the dial for adjusting the target size was moved to the left side of the sight instead of the front. The area where the Mark II had the dial was replaced by a moving scale that indicated the current range to the target, along with a large pad that prevented pilot head injuries in the case of rapid deceleration.

The radar-aimed AGLT Village Inn tail turret incorporated a Mark II Gyro Sight and this turret was fitted to some Lancaster bombers towards the end of World War II.

=== German developments ===
Although since 1935 the relevant German companies offered the Reich Air Ministry (RLM) a new type of gyro-stabilized sight, the well-proven REVI (Reflexvisier, or reflector sight) remained in service for combat aircraft. The gyro-stabilized sights received the designation of EZ (Eigen- und Zielgeschwindigkeitsgesteuertes Visier, or enemy and indicated airspeed-controlled sight), such as EZ/REVI-6a.

The development of the EZ 40 gyro sight began in 1935 at the Carl Zeiss and Askania companies, but was of low priority. In the summer of 1941, the EZ 40, for which both the Carl Zeiss and Askania companies were submitting their developments, was rejected. Tested in a Bf 109 F, Askania's EZ 40 produced 50 to 100% higher hit probability compared to the then standard sight, the REVI C12c. It was however too large and unstable. In the summer of 1943 an example of the EZ 41 developed by the Zeiss company was tested, but was refused because of too many faults. In the summer 1942, the Askania company began work on the EZ 42, a gunsight which could be adjusted for the target's wingspan (in order to estimate distance to the target). The lead computation was provided by two gyroscopes. The system, weighing 13.6 kg (30 lb) complete, of which the reflector sight accounted for 3.2 kg, was much larger than allied models. Three examples of the first series of 33 pieces were delivered in July 1944. At this time, the Germans became aware that the British were using gyroscopic sights in their fighters, so the decision was made to rush sights into mass production at the Steinheil company in Munich before trials were fully complete. Thus, these were followed by further 770 units, the majority being built in early 1945. Each unit took 130 labour hours to produce.

Approximately 200 of the sights were installed into Fw 190 and Me 262 fighters for field testing. The pilots reported that attacks from 20 degrees deflection were possible. The EZ 42 was compared with an allied model from a captured P-47 Thunderbolt in September 1944 in Germany. Both sights were tested in the same Fw 190, and by the same pilot. The Germans preferred the solid ring of the moving portion of their reticle to the allies' arrangement of 6 dots, and felt that the center dot on the allied sight could obscure the target at long range. The Germans attempted to compare the accuracy of the two systems. Compared to the EZ 42, the Allied sight's prediction angle was found on average to be 20% less accurate versus the calculated "ideal" lead angle. However, a post-war RAE whitepaper assessed the results to be of doubtful validity due to the Germans' inaccurate understanding of U.S. .50 machine gun ballistics, and also questioned the methodology of calculating the target's flight path from gun camera stills. The same report suggests that the design of the EZ 42 would have led to significant altitude and temperature sensitivity, although this is not based on testing. The British were also very critical of the "extremely simple" training offered on usage of the sights.

In actual operation amongst Me 262 combat units, the sights did not live up to the promise. Postwar questioning of JV 44 pilots found that faulty installation often made the sights useless, and many pilots kept the sight caged to function as a basic reflector sight. Major Rudolf Sinner of JG 7 opposed their installation in his fighters after a demonstration in February/March 1945, finding the need to constantly adjust range to be unsuited to jet combat tactics.

== Usage (Mark II Gyro Sight) ==
- Avro Lincoln
- Blackburn Firebrand
- Chance Vought F-4U Corsair
- de Havilland Hornet & Sea Hornet
- de Havilland Mosquito
- de Havilland Vampire
- de Havilland Venom & Sea Venom
- Fairey Firefly
- Gloster Meteor
- Hawker Hurricane
- Hawker Tempest
- Hawker Typhoon
- Hawker Fury & Sea Fury
- Hawker Sea Hawk
- Lockheed P-80 Shooting Star
- North American P-51 Mustang
- North American F-86 Sabre
- North American F-100 Super Sabre
- Republic P-47 Thunderbolt
- Republic F-84 Thunderjet
- Supermarine Attacker
- Supermarine Seafang
- Supermarine Spiteful
- Supermarine Spitfire

== See also ==
- Index of aviation articles
- Head-up display – the further evolution of the gyro reflector gunsight
- Norden bombsight
