= Ajjamada B. Devaiah =

Indian Air Force officer

Squadron Leader A. B. Devaiah Maha Vir Chakra
- Born: 24 December 1932; Coorg district, Karnataka , British India
- Died: 7 September 1965 (aged 32); Pakistan
- Military career
- Allegiance: India
- Branch: Indian Air Force
- Service years: 1954 - 1965
- Rank: Squadron Leader
- Unit: No. 1 Squadron IAF
- Conflicts: Indo-Pakistani War of 1965
- Awards: Maha Vir Chakra

Squadron Leader Ajjamada Boppayya Devayya MVC is the only Indian Air Force officer to be posthumously awarded the Maha Vir Chakra (MVC). During the 1965 India-Pakistan War, Devayya (called 'Wings of Fire') was part of a strike mission targeting the Pakistani airbase in Sargodha when he was attacked by an enemy aircraft. He shot down the enemy pursuer's plane but in the process his aircraft was damaged and he went missing. Presumably he died in Pakistani territory. Twenty-three years later, in 1988, he was posthumously awarded the MVC award.

== Biography ==
Devayya was born on 24 December 1932 at Coorg, Karnataka. He was the son of Dr. Bopayya.

In 1954 he was commissioned into the Indian Air Force (IAF) as a pilot. At the outbreak of the 1965 war, he was an instructor at the Air Force Flying College. He was posted to No.1 "Tigers" Squadron and flew the Mystere IVa fighter bomber.

As a senior flying instructor, Squadron Leader Devayya was part of an aircraft strike mission which went to Sargodha airfield in Pakistan. Despite being a standby in case one of the first 12 aircraft dropped out, he joined the air battle. Devayya was intercepted by a PAF F-104 Starfighter flown by Pakistani pilot Flt. Lt. Amjad Hussain. Devayya successfully evaded the Starfighter's attacks. But the faster aircraft caught up with him and damaged his plane. Yet Devayya attacked the Starfighter and hit it. The Starfighter went down, while Hussain ejected and parachuted. It is not known what happened to Devayya. The IAF Mysteres were short on fuel and efficiency. Devayya's Mystere was destroyed, and it is assumed that he died on Pakistani soil.

== Aftermath ==
The IAF was not aware of what had happened to Devayya, first recording him missing and later declaring him dead. Later, a British writer, John Fricker, was commissioned by the Pakistani Air Force to write an account of the war derived from Pakistani sources in 1979. What led to Devayya's actual death still remains a mystery. It was revealed much later by Pakistan that Devayya's body was found almost intact by villagers not very far from Sargodha and buried.

From Fricker's work, the IAF realised what had truly happened and in 1988 announced that the Maha Vir Chakra was to be awarded to Devayya posthumously.

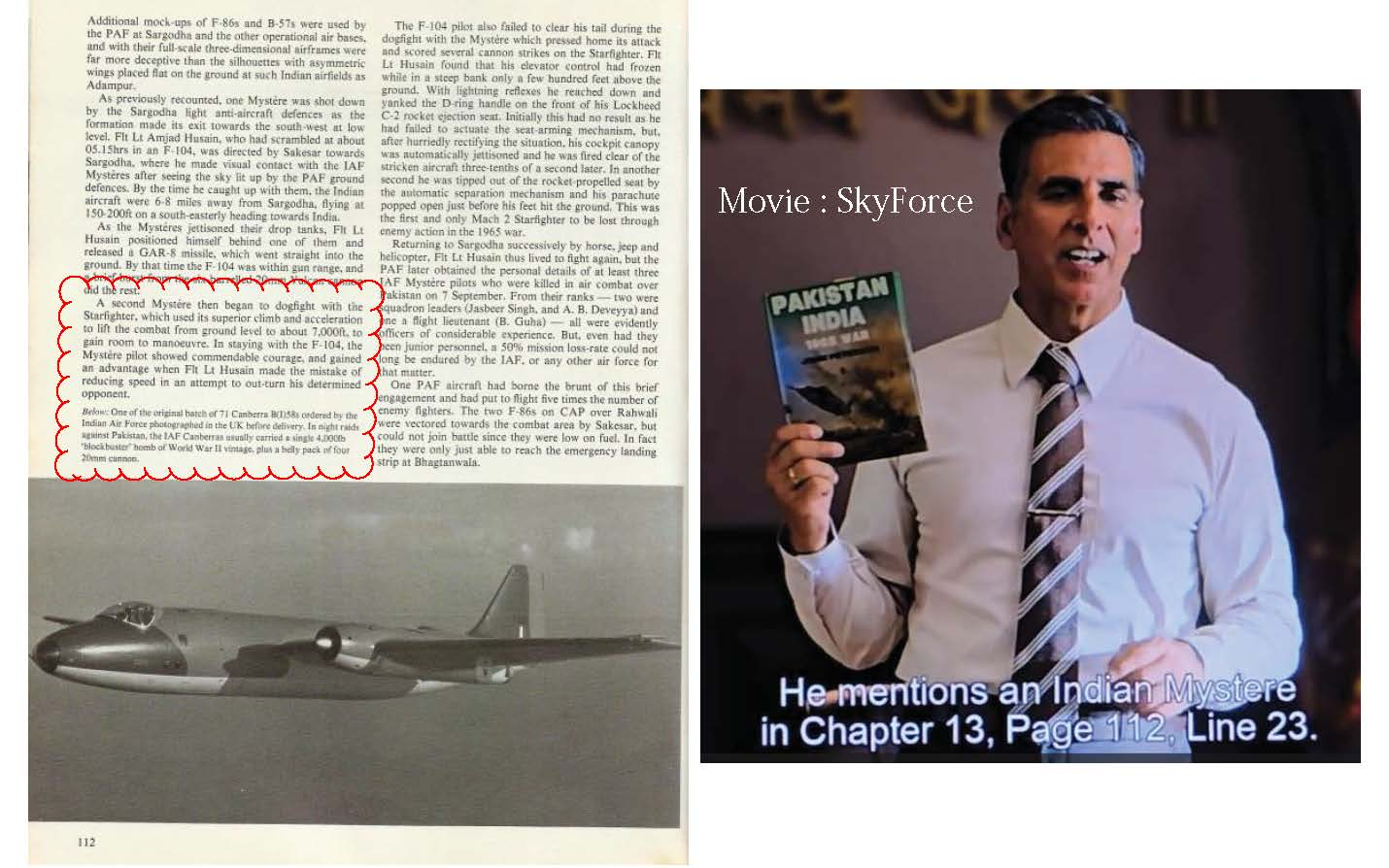
From Fricker's Work

This is the only posthumous Maha Vir Chakra that the IAF has awarded.

Mrs. Devayya accepted the posthumous Maha Vir Chakra in 1988, nearly 23 years after the war.

== Legacy ==
On 7 September 2009, the private bus stand circle in Madikeri in Kodagu was named after him. Kodava Makkada Koota, a community-based organization for Kodava people, installed Devaiah's statue in bus stand circle in Madikeri.

In 2023, a bus crashed into the statue as part of a suspected conspiracy by miscreants.

== In popular culture ==
Sky Force is based on the attack on Sargodha now renamed PAF Base Mushaf on 7 September 1965 by 13-aircraft contingent led by Group Captain O.P Taneja who is portrayed in this film by Akshay Kumar, Veer Paharia played Devayya, whose character is named T Vijaya, while Sara Ali Khan appeared as his wife.

== See also ==
- Lists of solved missing person cases
- Sargodha airstike
- Pathankot airstrike
