= Deflection (ballistics) =

Technique used for accurate shooting at a moving target

Deflection shooting is a technique of shooting ahead of a moving target, also known as leading the target, so that the projectile will "intercept" and collide with the target at a predicted point. This technique is necessary when the target will have significantly displaced its position during the time the projectile would take to reach the target, which can become the case over very long distances (e.g. a long sniper shot), due to fast moving targets (e.g. aerial dogfight against an opposing aircraft, or anti-aircraft fire against passing aircraft), hunting a running animal, or while using relatively slow projectiles (e.g. a bolt shot from a crossbow, or a basketball thrown to a running teammate).

Gyro gunsights developed for aircraft of the Second World War displayed a reticle that compensated for target lead. Modern fighter aircraft have automated deflection sights, where a computer calculates lead and projects the solution onto a head-up display (HUD). The visual assistance with targeting the gun is offset by the speed and agility of modern aircraft, compared to the days when targeting was less advanced.

In artillery, deflection is also used against fixed targets to compensate for windage and range. Due to the Earth's rotation, surface points have different velocities and curved motion, leading to apparent Coriolis drift of a long-range target.

== Computer games ==
Modern computer games of the first-person shooter genre typically feature a number of relatively low-velocity projectile weapons such as unguided shoulder-fired missiles, or fictional projectile weapons such as "plasma guns", which necessitates an attacker to lead his aim ahead of moving targets. Computer games that accurately model the ballistic trajectories (including velocity) of firearms also require leading of fire, much as in real life. This applies equally to combat aircraft (or even combat spacecraft) simulators, where the velocities of the craft involved are great enough to require leading with projectile weapons.

Additionally, in older multiplayer video games that calculate behavior on a remote server, even for high-velocity or hitscan weapons, there are issues of latency that may require leading. Essentially, even if the shooter has the target exactly in their sights, by the time the information relating weapon fire from the shooter's computer has reached the server, the target may have moved enough to avoid the shot. However, modern game-engines use a lag compensation system which moves all players back to a point in time based on the shooter's client interpolation time and ping (or, alternatively, by trusting the result calculated entirely on the client side) to evaluate if there was a hit or not. Such systems eliminate the need to lead hitscan weapons, but introduce the risk of players being hit by enemy fire shortly after taking cover behind objects, due to the latency causing a delay before the victim's computer receives the message that he has been shot.

== See also ==
- Direct fire
- Artillery
- Auxiliary predictor
