= Muhammad Ghulam Tawab =

2nd Chief of Air Staff of Bangladesh Air Force

Muhammad Ghulam Tawab SJ SBt
- মুহাম্মদ গোলাম তাওয়াব
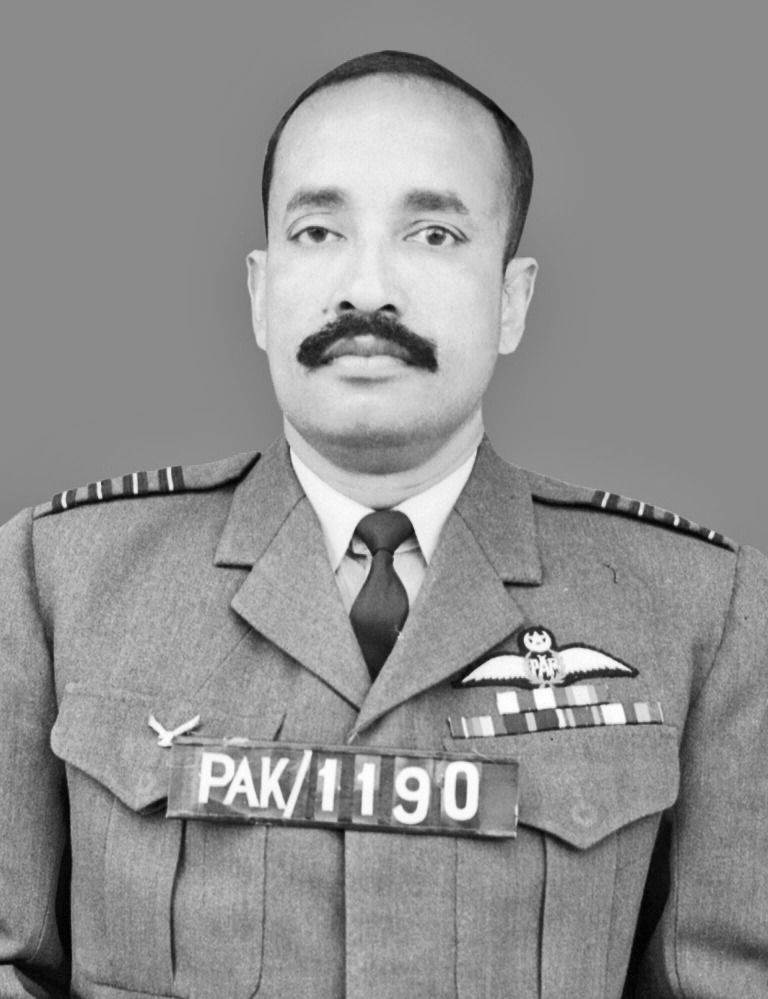
- Tawab as a Group Captain in the Pakistan Air Force, c. 1970

Minister of Health and Family Welfare
- In office 10 November 1975 – 3 December 1975
- Preceded by: Abdul Mannan
- Succeeded by: Muhammad Ibrahim

2nd Chief of Air Staff
- In office 15 October 1975 – 30 April 1976
- President: Khondaker Mostaq Ahmad; Abu Sadat Mohammad Sayem
- Preceded by: A. K. Khandker
- Succeeded by: Khademul Bashar

Personal details
- Born: 1 July 1930 Sylhet, Assam, British India (present day Sylhet, Bangladesh)
- Died: 23 February 1999 (aged 68) Munich, Bavaria, Germany

Military service
- Branch/service: Pakistan Air Force (1947-1971); Bangladesh Air Force (1971-1976)
- Years of service: 1951-1976
- Rank: Air Vice-Marshal
- Unit: No. 9 Squadron PAF
- Commands: ACAS (Administration) of Air Headquarters; AOC of BAF Tejgaon
- Battles/wars: Indo-Pakistani War of 1965; Indo-Pakistani air war of 1965; Pathankot Airstrike; Six-Day War; Bangladesh Liberation War
- Awards: Sitara-i-Jurat; Sitara-i-Basalat

Air Vice Marshal Muhammad Ghulam Tawab SJ SBt (1 July 1930 – 23 February 1999) was the second chief of the air staff of the Bangladesh Air Force who also served as deputy chief martial law administrator of Bangladesh with General Ziaur Rahman and Admiral M. H. Khan from 1975 to 1976.

== Early life ==
Tawab was born in a village near Sylhet, of Bengal Province, British Indian (present day Sylhet, Bangladesh) on 1 July 1930. He was married to Henrietta, a German national, and has two sons and a daughter.

== Career ==
After graduating college, Tawab joined the Pakistan Air Force in 1951 and was commissioned with the 9th GD(P) course as a pilot officer in the Pakistan Air Force. He graduated from PAF College Risalpur on September 15, 1951. During the 1965 War, he had led the Pathankot airstrike and was awarded Sitara-e-Jurat.

After Sheikh Mujib's assassination in August 1975, Tawab was immediately recalled from West Germany to active duty by then military chief, Major general Ziaur Rahman upon then Wing Commander M. Hamidullah Khan's advice. In October 1975, Tawab was promoted to air vice marshal and appointed chief of air staff, replacing Air Vice Marshal A. K. Khandker.

The Bengal Lancers were directly involved in the coup and killing of Sheikh Mujibur Rahman. They were posted to Bogra Cantonment, and their officers were sent to diplomatic postings outside of Bangladesh. Major General Ziaur Rahman, chief of the Bangladesh Army, had difficulty moving the Bengal Lancers to Bogra but eventually succeeded after Air Vice Marshal Tawab, chief of the Bangladesh Air Force, threatened to use the Air Force against the Bengal Lancers.

Air Vice Marshal M. G. Tawab addressed a rally of Bangladesh Jamaat-e-Islami, calling for Bangladesh to be changed from a secular state to an Islamic one. Tawab also brought back four army officers involved in the assassination of Sheikh Mujibur Rahman and reinstated them in the Bengal Lancers at Bogra Cantonment. This led to the 1976 Bogra mutiny under Syed Faruque Rahman, one of the officers Tawab helped return to Bangladesh.

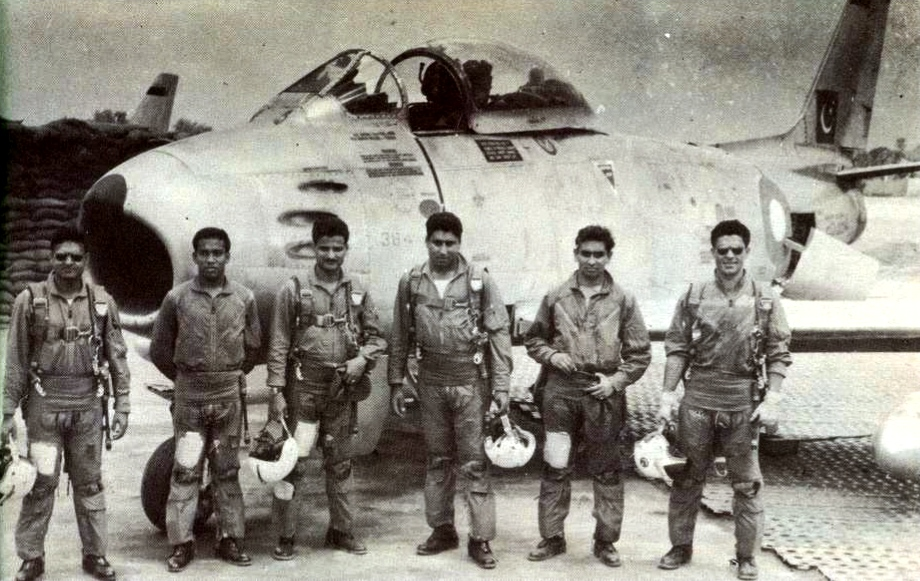
Wing Commander Muhammad Ghulam Tawab (second from left) standing with Sajad Haider (third from right) and other pilots of No. 19 Squadron, Pakistan Air Force, with one of their F-86F Sabres following the airstrikes on the Indian Air Force base at Pathankot.

After the failed mutiny, Major General Ziaur Rahman retired Tawab, sent the four officers back, and disbanded the Bengal Lancers.

M. G. Tawab retired from the Bangladesh Air Force in 1977 and returned to West Germany. He died in Munich on 23 February 1999, from prostate cancer after several years of illness.

== Awards and decorations ==
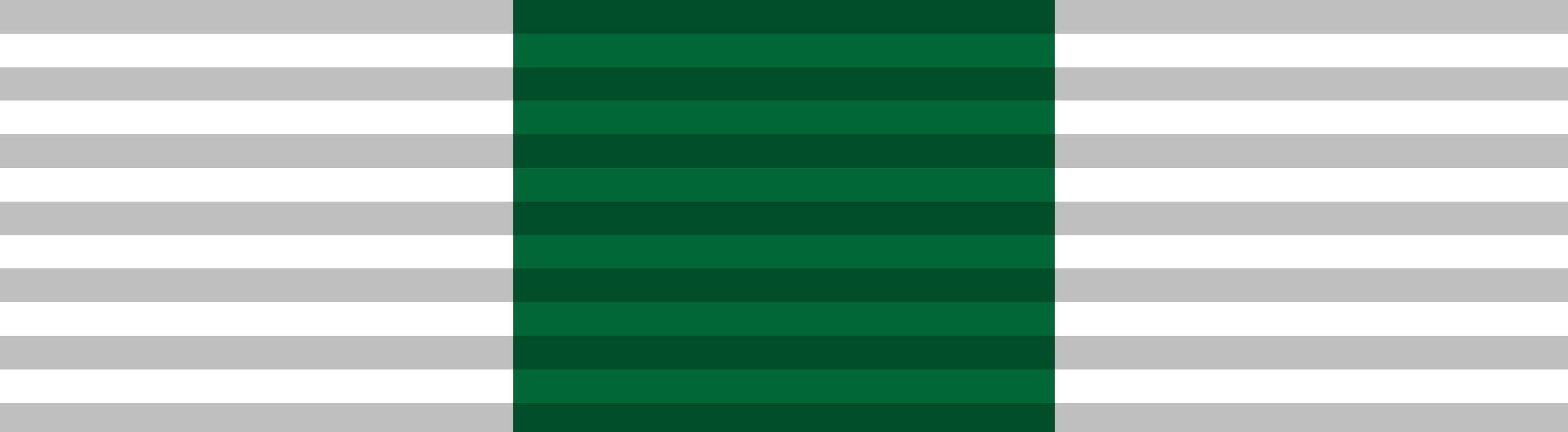

	Sitara-e-Jurat (Star of Courage) 1965 War	Sitara-e-Basalat (Star of Good Conduct) 1967	
Tamgha-e-Diffa (General Service Medal) Kashmir 1964/65 Clasp	Sitara-e-Harb 1965 War (War Star 1965)	Tamgha-e-Jang 1965 War (War Medal 1965)	Tamgha-e-Jamhuria (Republic Commemoration Medal) 1956

Military offices
Preceded by A. K. Khandker	Chief of Air Staff	Succeeded by Khademul Bashar
