= Dilawar Hussain (air marshal) =

Pakistani Air Marshal (1940-2020)

Air Marshal Dilawar Hussain HI(M) SJ SI(M) SBt
- دلاور حسین
- Air Marshal Hussain in the 90s

8th Director General Pakistan Aeronautical Complex
- In office May 1993 – November 1994
- Preceded by: AVM M Yousaf Khan
- Succeeded by: AVM Abdul Rahim Yousafzai

Air Officer Commanding Air Defence Command
- In office August 1989 – July 1990
- Preceded by: AVM Raja Aftab Iqbal
- Succeeded by: AVM Anwar Mahmood Khan

Deputy Chief of Air Staff (Operations)
- In office August 1988 – August 1989
- Preceded by: AVM Farooq Feroze Khan
- Succeeded by: AVM Bahar-Ul-Haque

Commander PAF Base Sargodha
- In office July 1985 – December 1986

Personal details
- Born: 8 September 1940 Quetta, Pakistan
- Died: 24 November 2020 (aged 80) Islamabad, Pakistan
- Children: 5
- Education: PAF College
- Awards: See list

Military service
- Branch/service: Pakistan Air Force
- Years of service: 1962–1994
- Rank: Air Marshal
- Unit: No. 14 Squadron PAF; No. 19 Squadron PAF; No. 7 Squadron RSAF
- Commands: Combat Commanders' School; PAF Base Mushaf; ACAS Air Operations at AHQ; DCAS Operations at AHQ; Pakistan Aeronautical Complex; Air Defence Command
- Battles/wars: Indo-Pakistani War of 1965; Indo-Pakistani Air War of 1965; Pathankot airstrike; Indo-Pakistani War of 1971; Indo-Pakistani air war of 1971; Battle of Sharoora

Dilawar Hussain (Note: Urdu: دلاور حسین) (8 September 1940 – 24 November 2020) was a Pakistani three-star rank officer in the Pakistan Air Force (PAF), known as a legendary pilot for his role in the Indo-Pakistani air war of 1965. He was the first Pakistani air force officer to command a Saudi fighter squadron, the No. 7 Sqn. Prior to his retirement in 1994, he had been serving as the eighth Director General of the Pakistan Aeronautical Complex since 1993.

In 1994, Dilawar and Vice Chief of Air Staff Air Marshal Shafique Haider were controversially superseded by Prime Minister Benazir Bhutto in favour of Abbas Khattak for the position of Chief of Air Staff. Khattak was later accused of receiving kickbacks from Mirage sales, along with Benazir's husband, Asif Ali Zardari.

== Early life ==
Hussain was born at Quetta, one of the major cities of Pakistan in 1940. Completing his studies from the Government College in Quetta, he opted for the Pakistan Air Force.

== Military career ==
Hussain joined the PAF College in 1959. During his training, he was sent to United States for advanced training with United States Air Force. He flew various elite aircraft of the time, including the T-33, T-34, and T-37. His tenure at foreign also allowed him acquiring experience of mastering the F-86.

=== 1965 War ===
Air Marshal Nur Khan praises his predecessor Air Marshal Asghar Khan for the PAF's success in the war. In addition, Squadron Leader Sajad Haider is seen briefing pilots, including Hussain, who is seen at the 0:17 mark seated in the center

Hussain was assigned to No. 19 Sqn during the Indo-Pakistani war of 1965. In the early hours of the war, the PAF conducted Pathankot airstrike, of which Hussain was a part. With only 8 F-86F Sabres, under the leadership of Squadron Leader Sajad Haider, No. 19 Sqn had destroyed at least 11 (some claims say 13 or 14) aircraft of the Indian Air Force. Hussain flew an F-86F in this mission, which became PAF's most successful air raid. For his gallantry, he was awarded Sitara-e-Jurat, Pakistan's third highest award.

==== Sitara-e-Jurat ====
His Sitara-e-Jurat citation reads:

CITATION
FLIGHT LIEUTENANT DILAWAR HUSSAIN (PAK/4264)

Flt Lt Dilawar Hussain was one of the greatest sources of inspiration for his Sqn mates throughout the operation. He displayed great keenness to operate in the battle area and great commitment and determination in the face of heavy odds was most inspiring. He flew at all times in a manner that befits the best of the fighter pilots of the PAF. His personal score of enemy tanks and aircraft on the ground was three aircraft, and eight tanks destroyed; one aircraft and four tanks damaged; one armoured vehicle and thirteen others destroyed; nine vehicles and one gun damaged. He flew ten Air Defence sorties and 17 Strike/Close support missions. On one occasion, he continued his mission without being in the least bit apprehensive after having been hit by ground fire. For his courage and high spirits in the performance of his duty, Flt Lt Dilawar Hussain is awarded SJ.

=== 1971 War ===
Hussain was part of the No. 14 Sqn in Dacca during the Indo-Pakistani war of 1971. On 4 December 1971, he flew the Canadair Sabre Mk6 and shot down Flight Lieutenant Kenneth Charles Tremenheere of No. 14 Sqn, who was later taken as a Prisoner of War. On 6 December, Hussain flew with a group of four F-86s to support Pakistani soldiers in the Comilla Sector near Dacca. During this mission, one of the officers under his command, Flying Officer Shamshad reportedly shot down an IAF Hunter.

== Post war ==
After participating in two major wars, Hussain later commanded the No. 14 Sqn. He held the appointment of Director of Operations at the Air Headquarters and also served as Commanding Officer of the Combat Commanders' School as a Group Captain. As an Air commodore, he was appointed as Base Commander PAF Base Mushaf, and Assistant Chief of Air Staff (Operations). Upon elevation to the rank of Air vice-marshal, he served as Deputy Chief of the Air Staff (Operations). He also headed the Pakistan Aeronautical Complex.

== Death ==
Hussain died on 24 November 2020 at his residence in Islamabad. The then Chief of the Air Staff, Mujahid Anwar Khan had shared deep sorrow over the death of the respected War Veteran, according to a PAF news release. He was laid down with full military honour.

== Awards and decorations ==
Hussain has been awarded with various awards throughout his distinguished military career. His awards and decorations are mentioned below. (Note: The Hilal-i-Imtiaz medal is not seen in his photo, as it was awarded to him afterwards. This medal is usually given to three-star officers of the Pakistan Air Force in recognition of their service.) (Note: The service year medals are not seen in his photo because the medals were given to the military personnels after the time that photo was taken. His contemporary fellow officers have those medals.)

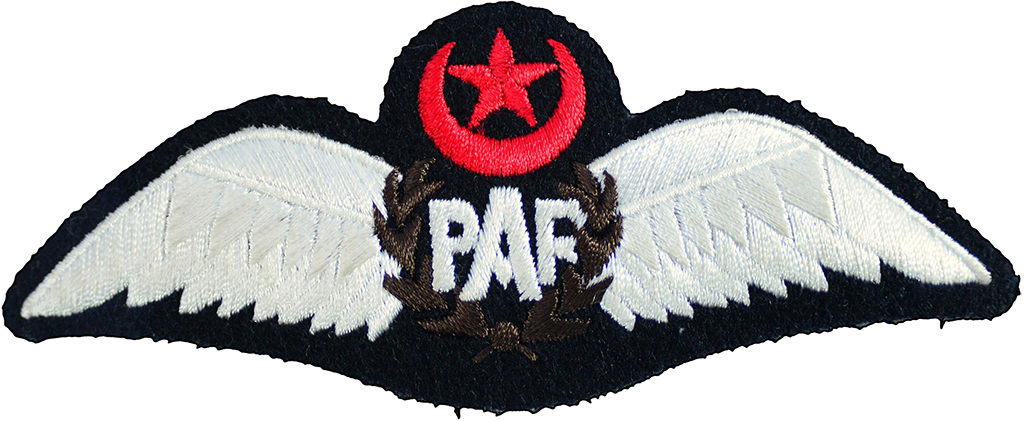

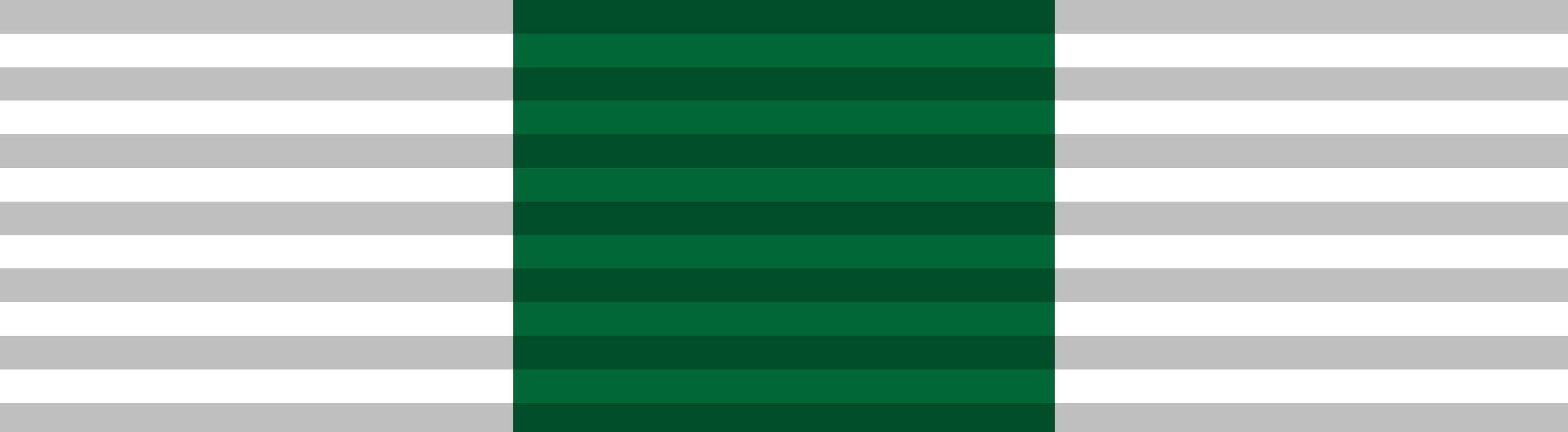

PAF GD(P) Badge RED (More than 3000 Flying Hours)
Hilal-e-Imtiaz (Military) (Crescent of Excellence)	Sitara-e-Jurat (Star of Courage) 1965 War	Sitara-i-Imtiaz (Military) (Star of Excellence)	Sitara-e-Basalat (Star of Valour)
Tamgha-e-Diffa (Defence Medal): 1. 1965 War Clasp; 2. 1971 War Clasp	Sitara-e-Harb 1965 War (War Star 1965)	Sitara-e-Harb 1971 War (War Star 1971)	Tamgha-e-Jang 1965 War (War Medal 1965)
Tamgha-e-Jang 1971 War (War Medal 1971)	10 Years Service Medal	20 Years Service Medal	30 Years Service Medal
Tamgha-e-Sad Saala Jashan-e-Wiladat-e-Quaid-e-Azam (100th Birth Anniversary of Muhammad Ali Jinnah) 1976	Hijri Tamgha (Hijri Medal) 1979	Tamgha-e-Jamhuriat (Democracy Medal) 1988	Qarardad-e-Pakistan Tamgha (Resolution Day Golden Jubilee Medal) 1990
