= Radar gunsight =

Type of gunsight for aerial combat

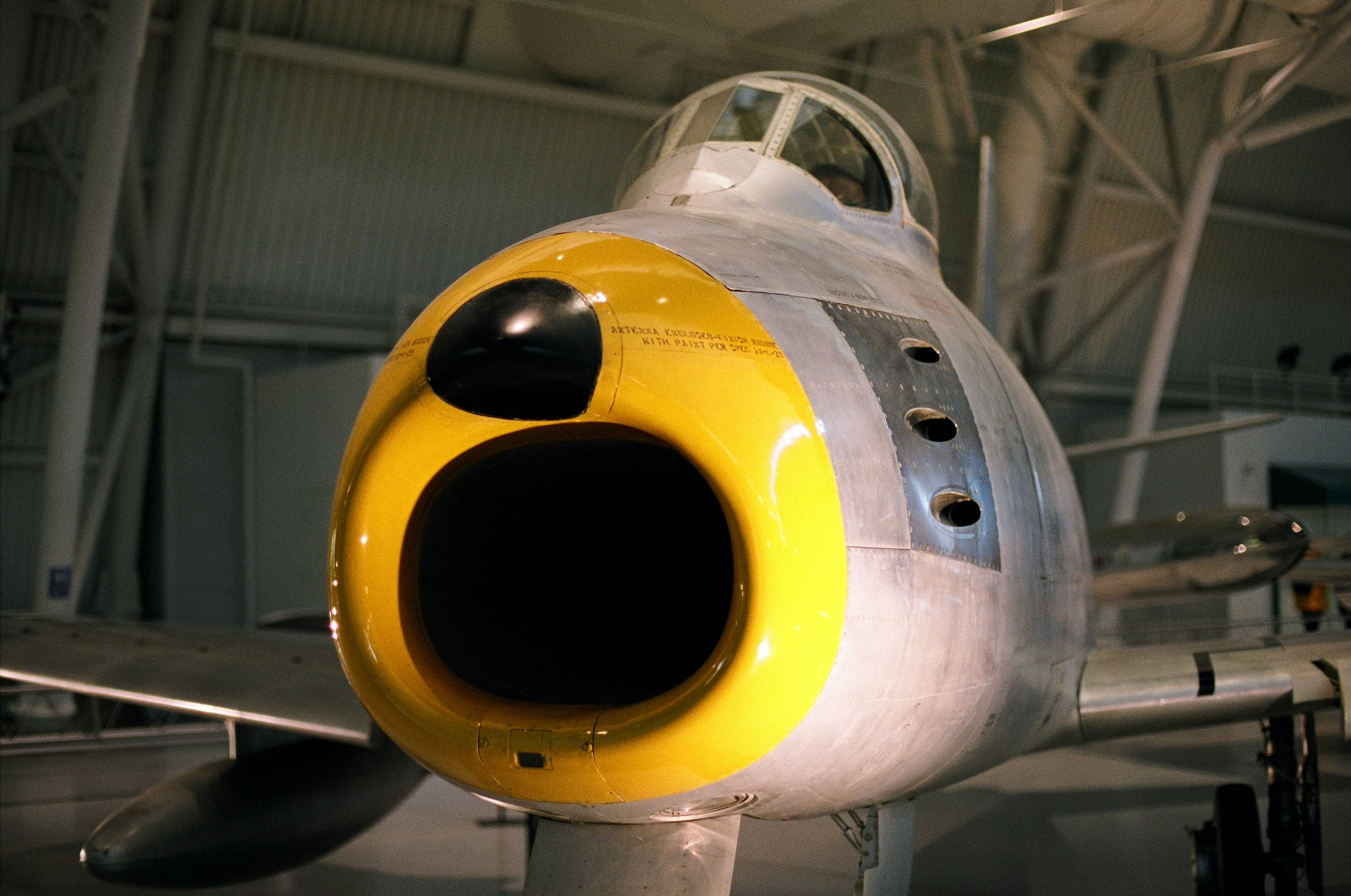
The small black patch on the nose of this North American F-86 Sabre is the fibreglass cover over the small AN/APG-30 radar that fed the A-4 radar gunsight.

A radar gunsight is a type of gunsight for aerial combat that combines a gyro gunsight with a small radar. They were introduced just after World War II and used into the 1960s. After that, more complex sighting systems and heads up displays replaced these designs. The APG-30 gunsight is credited with giving the North American F-86 Sabre the edge over the Mikoyan-Gurevich MiG-15 in the Korean War, the two types being similarly matched otherwise but the gunsight allowing longer range accurate fire.

The proper calculation of lead requires two values, the distance to the target and the turn that the attacking aircraft is making. The turn can be measured directly using a gyroscope, and such systems had been introduced during WWII. These had no direct way to measure the range to the target, however, requiring the pilot to estimate the range or measure it using simple optical devices.

Radar gunsights simply add a small radar to the system to directly and automatically measure the range continually during the attack. This automates the calculation and lowers pilot workload. Early use led to reviews of excellent performance, with hits being recorded at ranges up to 2,000 yards (1.8 km), a range that would formerly be considered unattainable.

== See also ==
- Index of aviation articles
- Head up display
