= 1965 Pathankot airstrike =

Pakistani aerial operation during the 1965 Indo-Pak War

Coordinates: 32°14′26″N 75°38′10″E

Pathankot airstrike
- Part of Indo-Pakistani war of 1965 and Indo-Pakistani air war of 1965
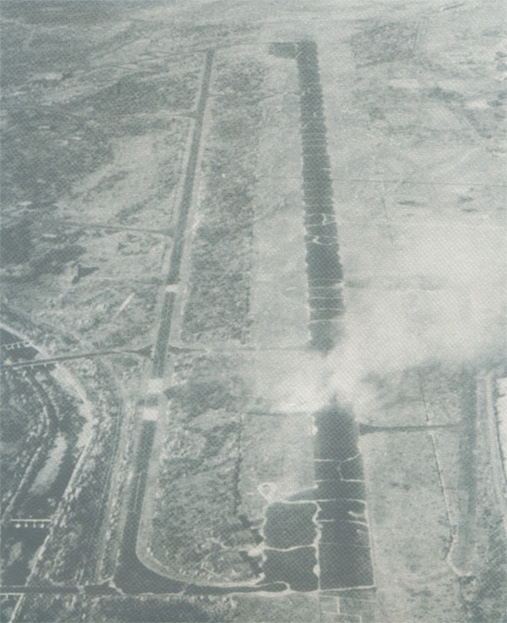
- Pathankot airbase in the aftermath of the raid captured by a Pakistani reconnaissance aircraft
Date	6 September 1965; 61 years ago
Location	Pathankot airbase, Punjab, India
Result	Pakistani victory: Indian retaliation

Belligerents
Pakistan	India

Commanders and leaders
Air Marshal Nur Khan; Squadron Leader Sajad Haider; Wing Commander Muhammad Ghulam Tawab	Air Marshall Arjan Singh

Units involved
Pakistan Air Force: No. 19 Sqn	Indian Air Force: No. 23 Sqn; No. 3 Sqn; No. 31 Sqn; No. 28 Sqn

Strength
8 F-86 Sabres	Unknown, planes remained grounded

Casualties and losses
None	Pakistani claim 13 aircraft destroyed Indian claim 10 aircraft destroyed: 2 MiG-21; 6 Mystère IVs; 1 Hunter F56; 1 Vampire FB52

The Pathankot airstrike was a key aerial operation of the Indo-Pakistani war of 1965. It took place on the evening of 6 September 1965, when the No. 19 Squadron of the Pakistan Air Force attacked the Indian Air Force base at Pathankot rendering it severely damaged and inoperable for the remainder of the war. It is considered as the PAF's most successful air raid to date.

== Background ==
On 6 September 1965, India crossed the International Border into Pakistan with a large offensive directed towards Lahore, Pakistan's second largest city. This was done in order to alleviate the pressure in Kashmir, where Pakistan's Operation Grand Slam had inflicted pressure on the Indian Army's operational capabilities. As a result of the Indian invasion toward Lahore, Pakistan was forced to abandon the operation in Kashmir and counter the Indian offensive in Punjab. Aerial operations by both sides became more common following this event, with the most significant instance being the PAF attack on Pathankot on the evening of 6 September.

== Planning ==
The attack on Pathankot was part of a larger, three-pronged aerial operation planned by the PAF, with the other two targets being at Halwara and Adampur. While the Pathankot mission was a great success, the other two attacks could not meet their objectives. The Adampur strike, led by the legendary fighter pilot M. M. Alam, turned around before it could reach the base while the attack on Halwara, led by S. A. Rafiqui was intercepted by IAF aircraft. In the resulting dogfight, the IAF lost 4 aircraft (2 Hawker Hunters and 2 De Havilland Vampires) while the PAF only lost 2 F-86 Sabres, however the attack on the airbase was prevented.

According to Squadron Leader Sajad Haider, who led the raid on Pathankot, the attack was risky because the target was 257 miles away while the operational range of the F-86 was only 180 miles. He also said that the decision to strike Pathankot came as a surprise, as they had been preparing for a strike on Ambala.

== Attack on Pathankot airbase ==
The attack was launched on the evening of 6 September 1965. A formation of 8 F-86 Sabres of the PAF's 19th Squadron (nicknamed Sherdils, Lionhearts in Urdu), led by Squadron Leader Sajad Haider and wing commander M. G. Tawab, took off from Peshawar towards Pathankot. The formation reached the target airfield at 5:30 p.m. and unleashed heavy fire upon the base. The attack proved to be a resounding success. The airbase was severely damaged and inoperable for the remainder of the war, and over a dozen IAF aircraft were destroyed, including several state-of-the-art MiG-21 fighter aircraft, freshly acquired by India from the Soviet Union.

None of the Pakistani aircraft involved in the airstrike were shot down despite heavy anti-aircraft fire by the Indians. All 8 F-86 Sabres returned home safely. According to Haider, the true credit for the successes at Pathankot and another PAF strike at Wagah should go to the younger pilots, stating that "even at our firing range in peace time in Peshawar, such accuracy was rare."

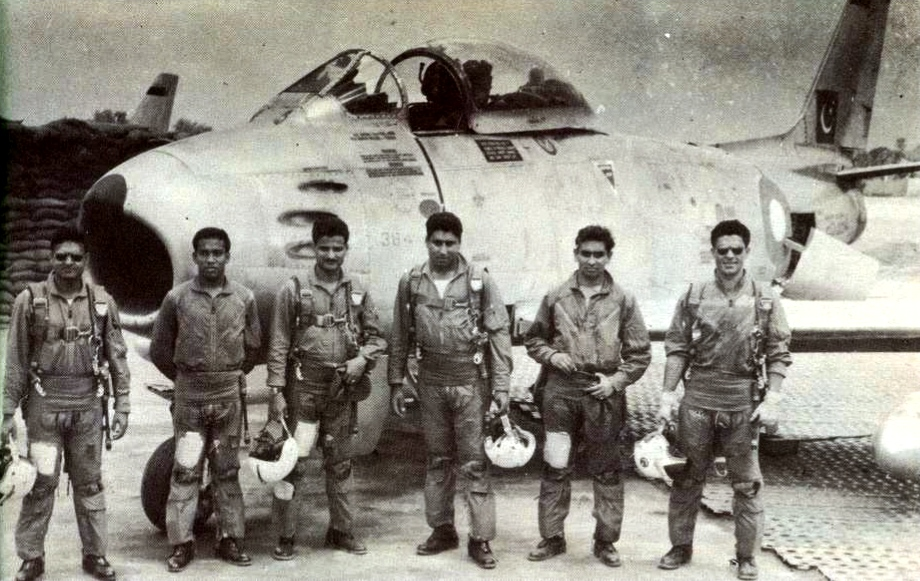
Sajad Haider (centre) after the airstrike on Pathankot with his fighter pilots

The PAF faced almost no air-to-air resistance from the IAF during the mission, as most of the aircraft in Pathankot remained grounded throughout the strike. According to IAF Air Marshal Raghavendran, the pilots failed to scramble their aircraft in time, and instead had to hide in nearby trenches to dodge fire from the Sabres. He provides an account of the attack:

"There was pandemonium. Bullets were flying all around. We all rushed to the nearest trench and dived in, not sitting and crouching as we should have been but piling ourselves flat on top of each other!! We could hear and see the Pakistani Sabres going round and round, as though in range practice, and picking off all the possible aircraft, including the MiG-21s, in spite of the anti-aircraft guns blazing away."

== Casualties and losses ==
The operation turned out to be a success for PAF, as IAF faced severe casualties. The PAF claims that at least 13 Indian aircraft were destroyed. IAF claims 10 aircraft were destroyed. PAF's exceptional performance has been admitted by IAF officers. India retaliated the following day with a large scale attack on the Pakistani base at Sargodha.

== Gallantry awards ==
Sitara-e-Jurat (Star of Courage), Pakistan's third highest military honor, was awarded to Squadron Leader Sajad Haider, Wing Commander Muhammad Ghulam Tawab and Flight Lieutenant Dilawar Hussain for their leadership and acts of gallantry during the Pathankot mission.
