= Kalaikunda =

- Census Town
- Location in West Bengal, India Kalaikunda (India)
- Coordinates: 22°20′32.6″N 87°13′35.4″E
- Country: India
- State: West Bengal
- District: Paschim Medinipur

Population (2011)
  - Total: 9,344

Languages*
  - Official: Bengali, Santali, English
- Time zone: UTC+5:30 (IST)
- Vehicle registration: WB
- Lok Sabha constituency: Medinipur
- Vidhan Sabha constituency: Kharagpur
- Website: paschimmedinipur.gov.in

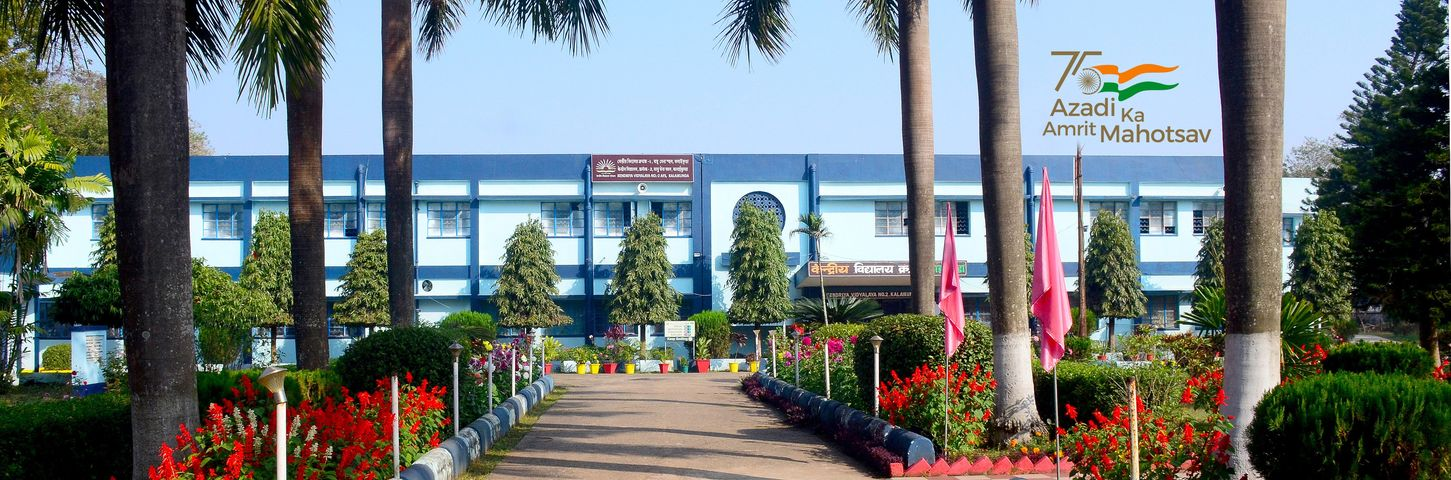
Kendriya Vidhyalaya No.2 Kalaikunda

Kalaikunda is a census town in the Kharagpur I CD block in the Kharagpur subdivision of the Paschim Medinipur district in the state of West Bengal, India.

== Geography ==
Cities and towns in the northern part of Kharagpur subdivision (including Khararagpur I & II, Debra and Pingla CD blocks) of Paschim Medinipur district
M: municipal city/ town, CT: census town, R: rural/ urban centre, H: historical/ religious centre, F: facilities
Owing to space constraints in the small map, the actual locations in a larger map may vary slightly

=== Location ===
Kalaikunda is located at 22°20′32.6″N 87°13′35.4″E.

=== Area overview ===
Kharagpur subdivision, shown partly in the map alongside, mostly has alluvial soils, except in two CD blocks in the west – Kharagpur I and Keshiary, which mostly have lateritic soils. Around 74% of the total cultivated area is cropped more than once. With a population density of 787 per km^{2}nearly half of the district’s population resides in this subdivision. 14.33% of the population lives in urban areas and 86.67% in the rural areas.

Note: The map alongside presents some of the notable locations in the subdivision. All places marked in the map are linked in the larger full screen map.

== Air Force Station ==
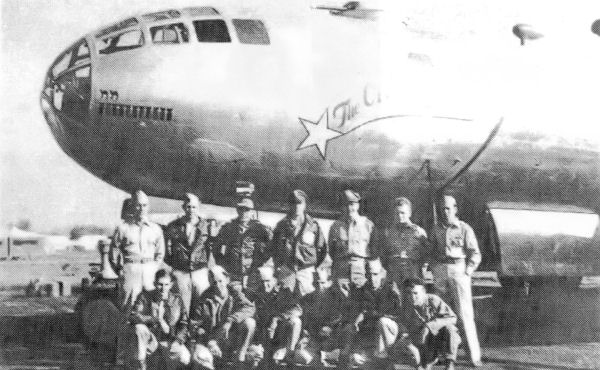
B-29 "The Craig Comet" of the 794th Bomb Squadron 468th Bomb Group at Kalaikunda Air Force Station

Kalaikunda Air Force Station is an Indian Air Force base. It was built by the British during World War II. Kalaikunda having two Kendriya Vidhaylaya KV No.1 and KV No. 2. Mostly Air force personnel children go to these schools.

== Demographics ==
As per 2011 Census of India Kalaikunda had a total population of 9,344 of which 5,196 (56%) were males and 4,148 (44%) were females. Population below 6 years was 1,202. The total number of literates in Kalaikunda was 6,973 (74.63% of the population over 6 years).

.* For language details see Kharagpur I#Language and religion

== Infrastructure ==
According to the District Census Handbook 2011, Paschim Medinipur, Kalaikunda covered an area of 2.17 km^{2}. Among the civic amenities, the protected water supply involved tap water from treated sources, borewell, tubewell. It had 804 domestic electric connections. Among the medical facilities, it had 2 dispensaries/ health centres, 1 nursing home, 1 charitable hospital/ nursing home, 15 medicine shops. Among the educational facilities it had were 3 primary schools.

== Transport ==
Kalaikunda is a station on the Kharagpur-Tatanagar line of South Eastern Railway.
