= No. 7 Squadron RSAF =

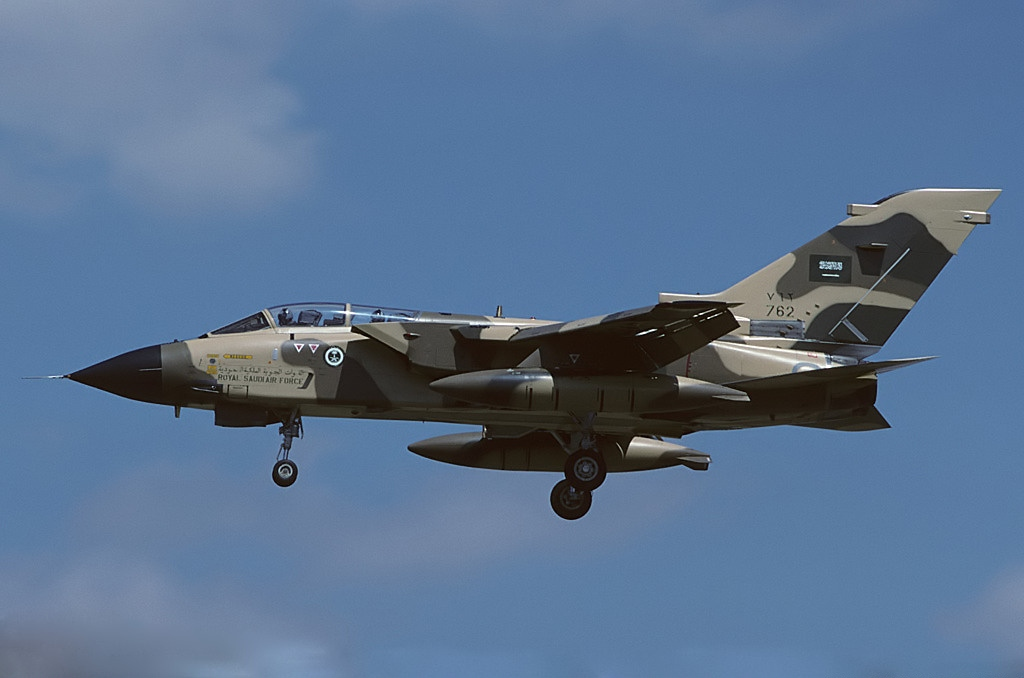
- Tornado of 7 Squadron at RAF Fairford in 1994
- Active: 1970s–present
- Country: Saudi Arabia
- Branch: Royal Saudi Air Force
- Type: Squadron
- Part of: RSAF 11 Wing
- Base: King Abdulaziz Air Base, Dhahran
- Aircraft: Panavia Tornado IDS

No. 7 Squadron RSAF is a squadron of the Royal Saudi Air Force that operates the Panavia Tornado IDS at King Abdulaziz Air Base, Dhahran, Eastern Province in Saudi Arabia within RSAF 11 Wing.

The squadron attended Exercise Spears of Victory 23 during February 2023 at King Abdulaziz Air Base.

It used to fly the Northrop F-5F in the ground attack and training role at King Abdulaziz Air Base, Dhahran during the 1970/80s.
