= No. 32 Squadron IAF =

No. 32 Squadron
- Active: 15 October 1963 - December 2016
- Country: Republic of India
- Branch: Indian Air Force
- Role: Fighter
- Garrison/HQ: Jodhpur AFS
- Nickname: "Thunderbirds"
- Mottos: Mahavegashya Dhundvrataha; Fast in speed, Fast in determination

Aircraft flown
- Fighter: MiG-21 Bison

No. 32 Squadron (Thunderbirds) is a fighter squadron of Indian Air Force. It was equipped with Mikoyan-Gurevich MiG-21Bison and was based at Jodhpur Air Force Station as part of South Western Air Command. The squadron was number plated in December 2016.

== History ==
The squadron was formed with the Mystere IV on 15 Oct 1963 at Air Force Station Adampur. This squadron later operated the Vampire (1965) aircraft followed by the Sukhoi-7 (1969), the MiG-21 Bis (1984) and is currently operating the Mig-21Bison (2003).

The squadron had received Presidential standard in 2013.

The squadron was number plated on an unspecified date. Currently, only 4 MiG-21 Bison squadron remains in service.

=== Assignments ===
- Indo-Pakistani War of 1965
- Indo-Pakistani War of 1971

== Aircraft ==
Aircraft	From	To	Air Base
Dassault Mystère IV	15 October 1963	February 1969	
Sukhoi Su-7 BMK	February 1969	February 1984	
MiG-21 bis	February 1984	February 2003	
MiG-21 Bison	February 2003	N/A	AFS Jodhpur
