= L. B. C. Cunningham =

Scottish statistician and physicist (1895–1946)

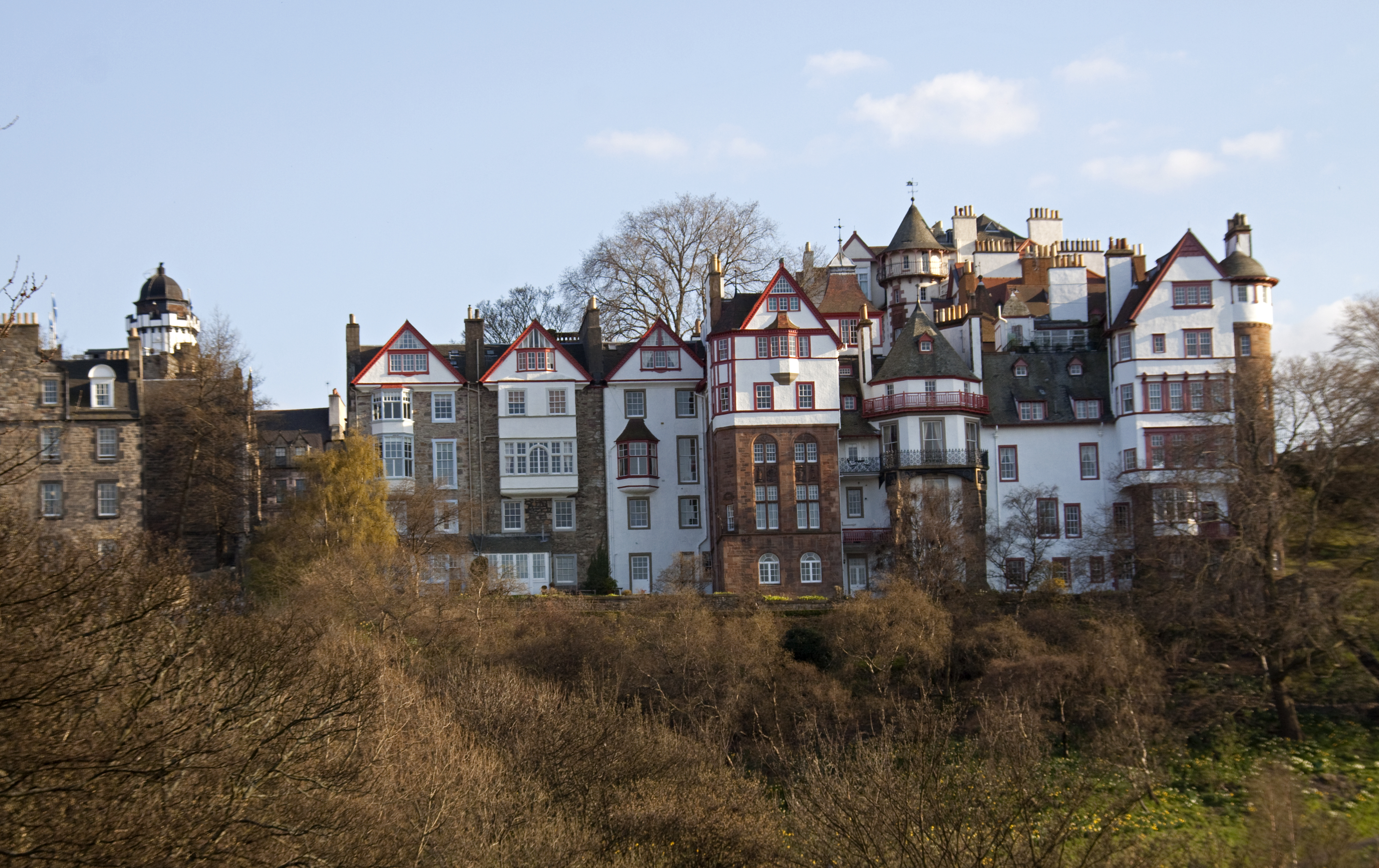
Ramsay Gardens

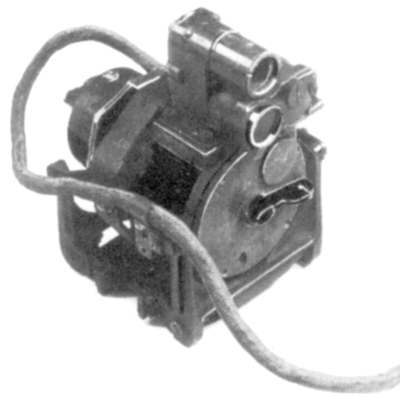
The Ferranti Gyro Sight Mk I

Dr Leslie Bennet Craigie Cunningham FRSE OBE (1895–31 August 1946) was a 20th-century Scottish statistician and physicist known for his expertise on air armaments. In 1936 he invented the gyro gunsight (GGS) which compensates for the movement of target aircraft, predicting their position dependent upon their speed. This created an effective increase in successful targeting from 100 to 400%

== Life ==
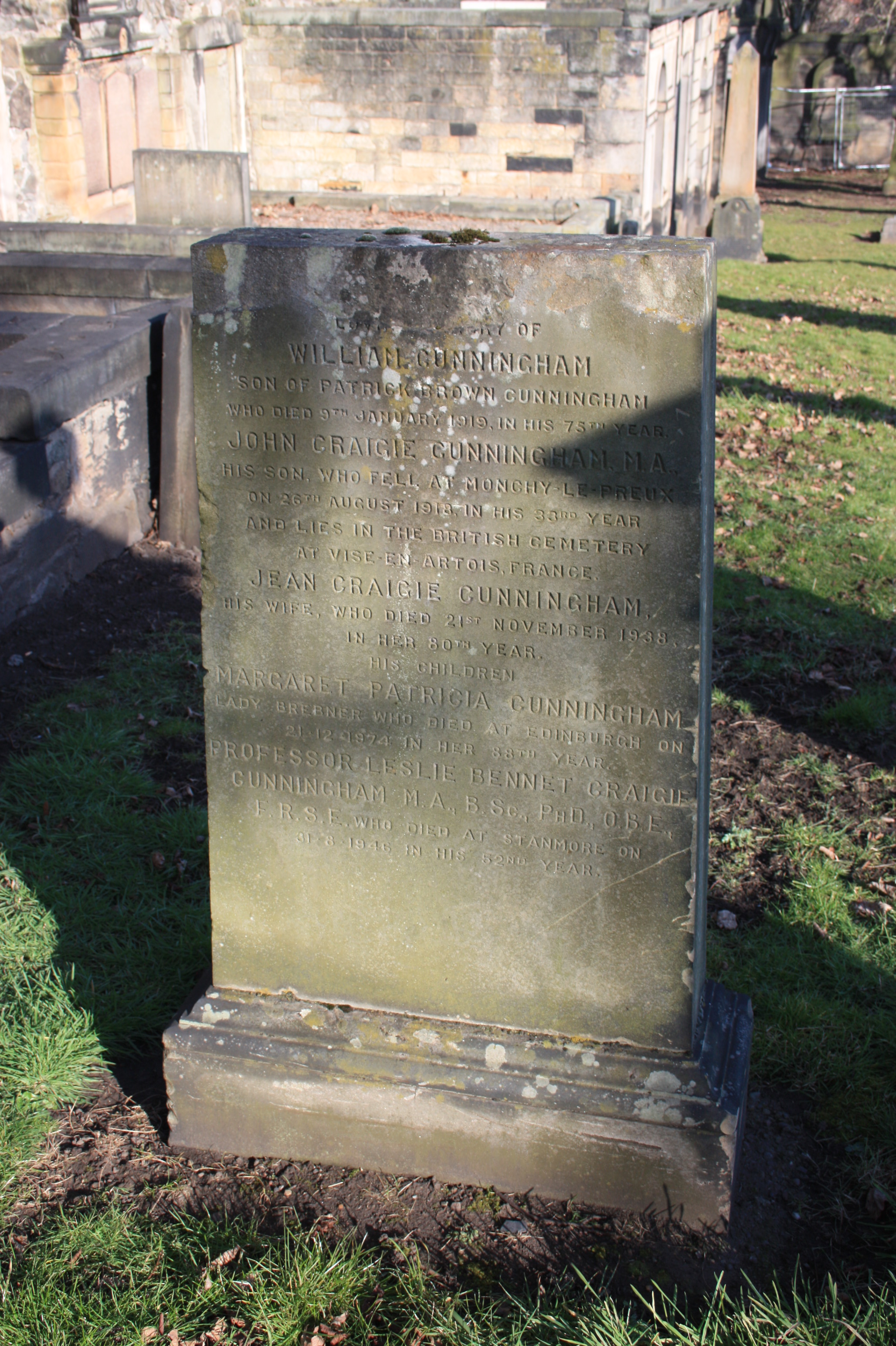
The grave of L B C Cunningham, New Calton Burial Ground

Cunningham was born in Edinburgh in 1895, the son of Jean Craigie and her husband William Cunningham. The family lived at 14 Ramsay Gardens at the top of the Royal Mile in Edinburgh.

He was educated at Edinburgh Academy, then from 1906 attended Sedbergh School in Yorkshire. He returned to Edinburgh to study at the University of Edinburgh but his education was interrupted by World War I. He served in the King's Own Scottish Borderers then the Royal Engineers. He had the rank of 2nd lieutenant. In May 1916 he was promoted to lieutenant.

After the war he returned to the University of Edinburgh, and in 1923 graduated with an MA BSc mathematics and physics. He continued at the university, gaining a PhD with a thesis on the Trajectory of Falling Bombs. In 1925 he began working for the RAF as an education officer. In 1931 he introduced the world's first course on advanced air armaments. In 1936, whilst at the Royal Aircraft Establishment he patented the Gyro gunsight, produced by Ferranti and immediately used by both the RAF and USAF. He also worked on position-finding equipment based on mathematical predictions (a precursor to radar).

In the World War II he was superintendent of air warfare analysis. In 1941 his gunsight was brought into active use in the Spitfire. He was given the rank of honorary squadron leader.

In 1945 he was elected a Fellow of the Royal Society of Edinburgh. His proposers were Sir Edmund Taylor Whittaker, Edward Copson, David Gibb and Alexander Aitken.

He died at 49 Beverley Gardens in Stanmore near Harrow on 31 August 1946 aged 51. He is buried with his parents in New Calton Burial Ground in Edinburgh just south of the main east-west entrance path.

== Publications ==
- Mathematical Theory of Combat: Air Warfare Analysis (1940)
