= No. 8 Squadron IAF =

No. 8 Squadron Eight Pursoots
- Active: 1 December 1942 – present
- Country: Republic of India
- Branch: Indian Air Force
- Role: Fighter
- Garrison/HQ: Bareilly AFS
- Nickname: "Eight Pursoots"
- Mottos: Surakshya Va Akraman; Offense is Defence

Aircraft flown
- Fighter: Sukhoi Su-30MKI

No. 8 Squadron also known as The Eight Pursoots Squadron nicknamed as Eight Pursoots is an Indian Air Force fighter squadron and is equipped with Su-30MKIs and based at Bareilly AFS.

== History ==
No. 8 Squadron were formed in 1943 at Tiruchirapalli and were trained at Peshawar and Bhopal. On 2 December 1943, they were moved to Doublemooring in Chittagong (now in Bangladesh) to work closely together with No. 82 Squadron RAF in the Burma Campaign. Equipped with Spitfires they had significant success against the Japanese Imperial Army.

While No. 8 Squadron is officially celebrated as having been raised on 1 March 1943, archival evidence suggests that its personnel and aircraft movements, as well as initial operational readiness, began as early as late 1942. The discrepancy between ceremonial and operational formation dates has been explored in a detailed historical analysis.

=== Assignments ===
- Burma Campaign
- Indo-Pakistani War of 1965
- Indo-Pakistani War of 1971

== Aircraft ==
| Aircraft | From | To | Air Base |
Pre-Independence (1942–47)
| Vultee A-31 Vengeance 1A | August 1943 | November 1944 | Tiruchirappalli |
| Supermarine Spitfire V | December 1944 | January 1945 | |
| Harvard IIB | July 1944 | January 1951 | |
| Supermarine Spitfire XIV | November 1944 | June 1946 | |
Post-Independence (1947–Present)
| Hawker Tempest II | April 1947 | December 1951 | |
| Vampire FB52 | December 1951 | June 1953 | |
| Vampire T55 | June 1953 | February 1957 | |
| Dassault Ouragan | November 1953 | February 1957 | |
| Dassault Mystère IV | February 1957 | February 1969 | |
| MiG-21 FL | February 1969 | February 2010 | Bagdogra, Tezpur |
| Sukhoi Su-30 MKI | February 2010 | Present | AFS Bareilly |
