= Dassault Mystère IV =

Fighter-bomber aircraft family, first transonic aircraft of the French Air Force

MD.454 Mystère IV
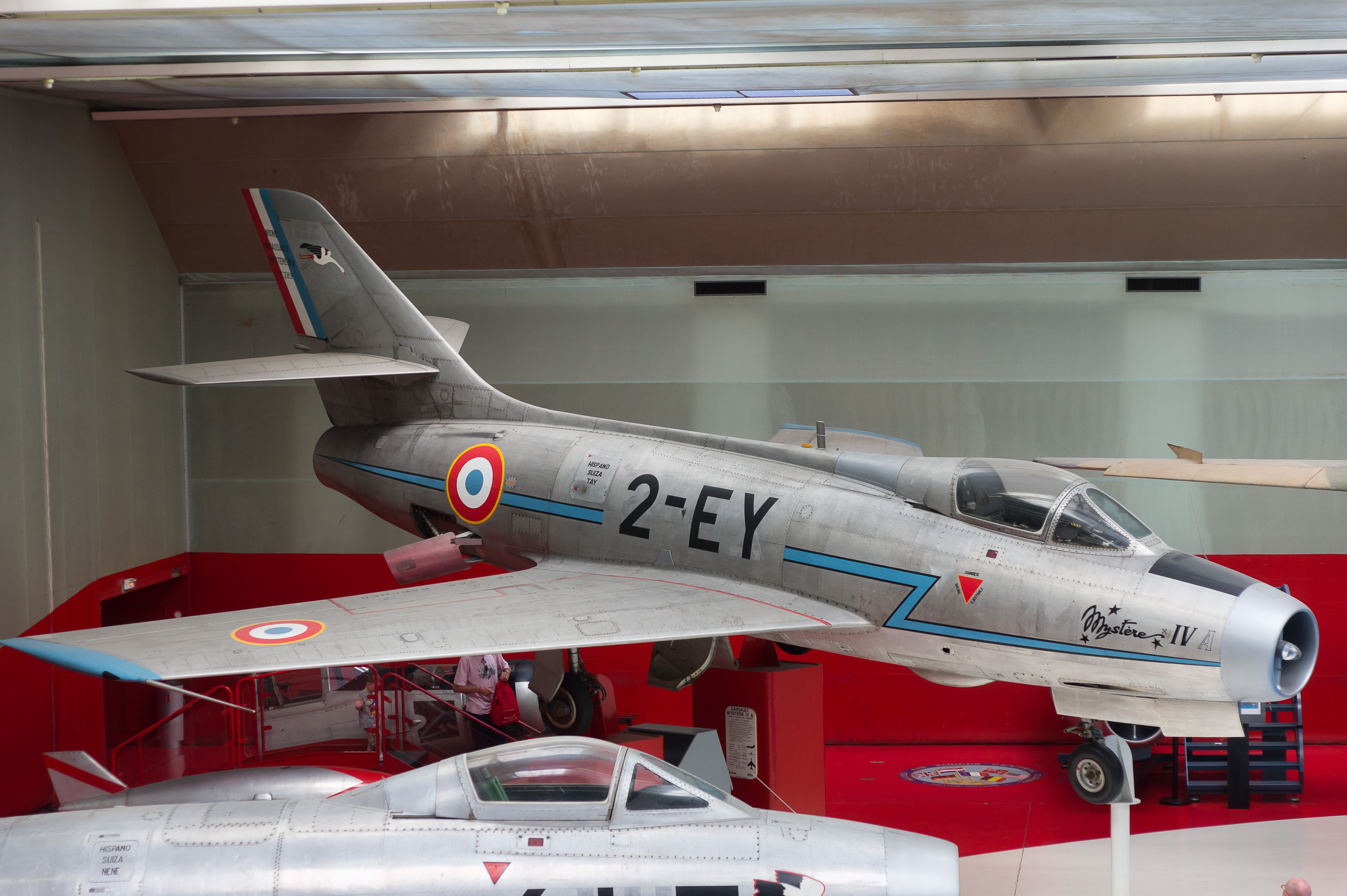
- Dassault Mystère IV A preserved at the Musée de l'Air.

General information
- Type: Fighter-bomber
- National origin: France
- Manufacturer: Dassault Aviation
- Primary users: French Air Force Indian Air Force; Israeli Air Force
- Number built: 411

History
- Manufactured: 1953–1958
- Introduction date: April 1953
- First flight: 28 September 1952
- Retired: 1980s
- Developed from: Dassault Mystère
- Developed into: Dassault Super Mystère

The Dassault MD.454 Mystère IV is a 1950s French fighter-bomber aircraft, the first transonic aircraft to enter service with the French Air Force. It was used in large-scale combat in the Israeli Air Force during the 1967 Six Day War.

== Design and development ==
The Mystère IV was an evolutionary development of the Mystère II aircraft. Although bearing an external resemblance to the earlier aircraft, the Mystère IV was in fact a new design with aerodynamic improvements for supersonic flight. The prototype first flew on 28 September 1952, and the aircraft entered service in April 1953. The first 50 Mystere IV A production aircraft were powered by British Rolls-Royce Tay turbojets, while the remainder had the French-built Hispano-Suiza Verdon 350 version of that engine.

== Operational history ==
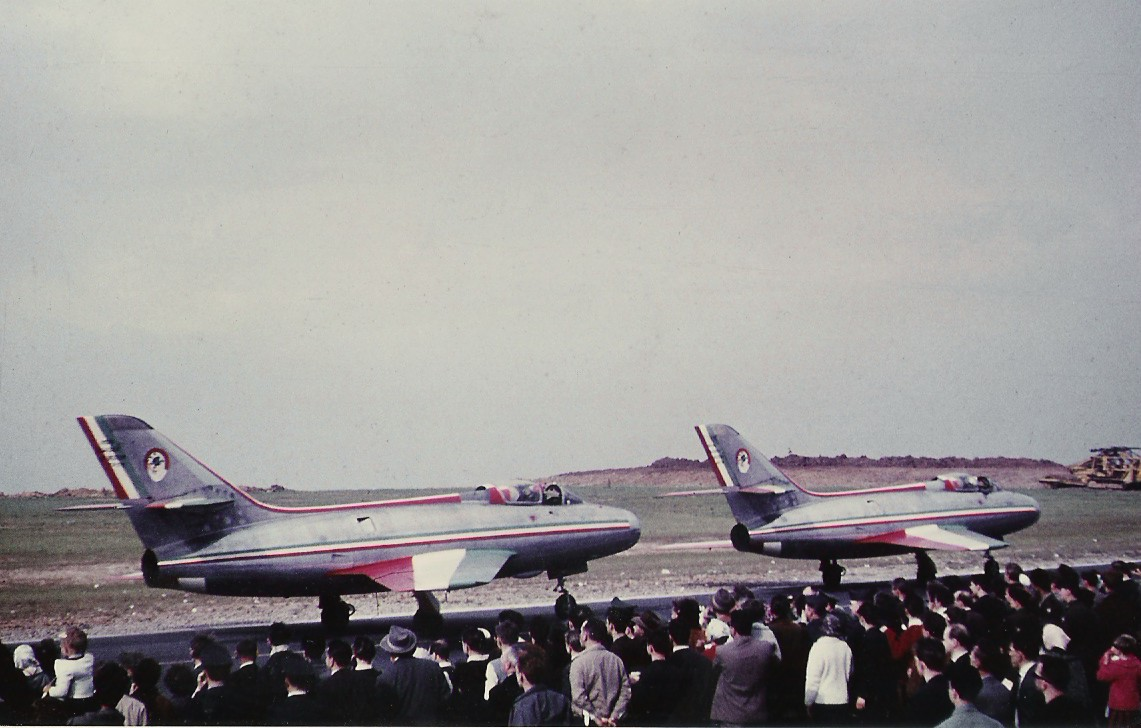
French Mystère IV As at Bitburg Air Base (Germany), early 1960s

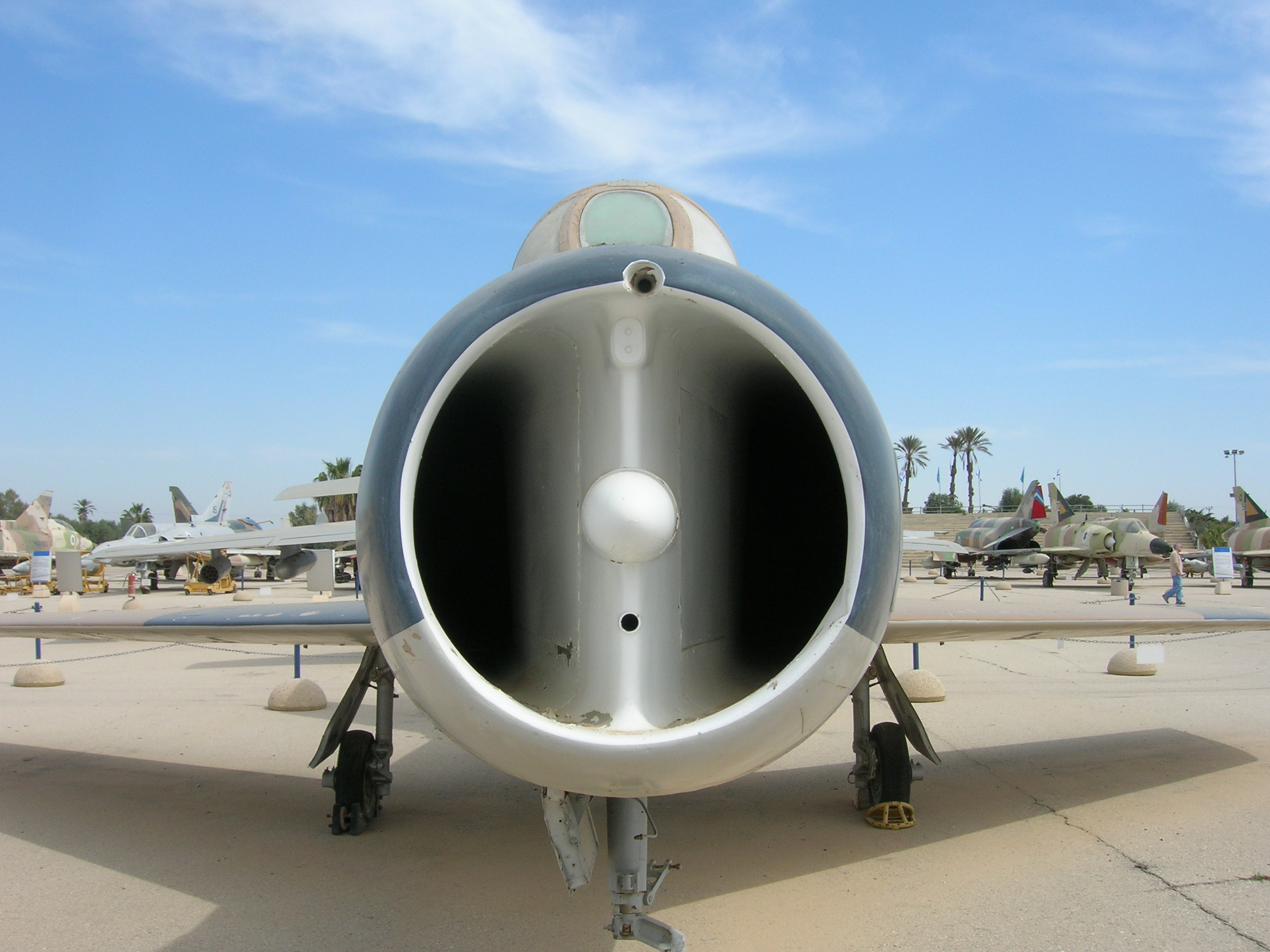
Israeli Dassault MD-520 Mystère IV A air intake

Israeli Mystère IVs saw action during the Arab–Israeli wars and were joined by the French Mystères for the Suez Crisis.

=== France ===
France was the main operator of the Mystère IV and at the peak usage operated 6 squadrons. Most of the aircraft were purchased under a United States Offshore Procurement contract and many were returned to US custody after they were retired. In April 1953 the United States government and the United States Air Force placed an order for 223 aircraft to be operated by the French.

The new Mystère IVs were used in the 1956 Suez Crisis and continued in use into the 1980s.

=== Israel ===
The Mystère IV became Israel's first swept-wing fighter when an order for Mystère IIs was changed to 24 Mystère IVs in 1955, which were delivered from April to June 1956, equipping 101 Squadron. A further 36 were delivered in August 1956, with a final aircraft, equipped for reconnaissance duties, delivered in September 1956.

On 29 October 1956, when Israel attacked Egypt in the opening move of what became known as the Suez Crisis, invading the Sinai Peninsula, the Mystères of 101 Squadron were deployed on both air-to-air and ground attack missions. On 30 October the Mystère IV got its first kill when eight aircraft fought 16 Egyptian Air Force MiG-15s. The Mystères shot down one MiG while a second MiG and one of the Mystères were damaged. On the next day, two Mystères engaged claimed four Egyptian De Havilland Vampires shot down, with another MiG-15 and a MiG-17 claimed later that day. Israeli Mystères flew a total of 147 sorties during the war, for the loss of a single aircraft, shot down by ground fire on 2 November.

A second squadron, 109 Squadron was equipped with the Mystère IV in December 1956, while 101 Squadron passed its Mystères to 116 Squadron in November 1961. Israel planned to replace the Mystère IV with the Douglas A-4 Skyhawk, but 109 and 116 Squadron still operated the French fighter on the outbreak of the Six-Day War. The Mystère was used as a ground attack aircraft during the war, flying 610 sorties, claiming three Arab aircraft (two MiG-17s and a Jordanian Hawker Hunter) shot down for the loss of seven Mystères, five to ground fire and two by enemy fighters (one by an Egyptian MiG-21 and one by a Jordanian Hunter flown by PAF pilot Saiful Azam).

The Mystère was finally retired from Israeli service on 18 March 1971.

=== India ===
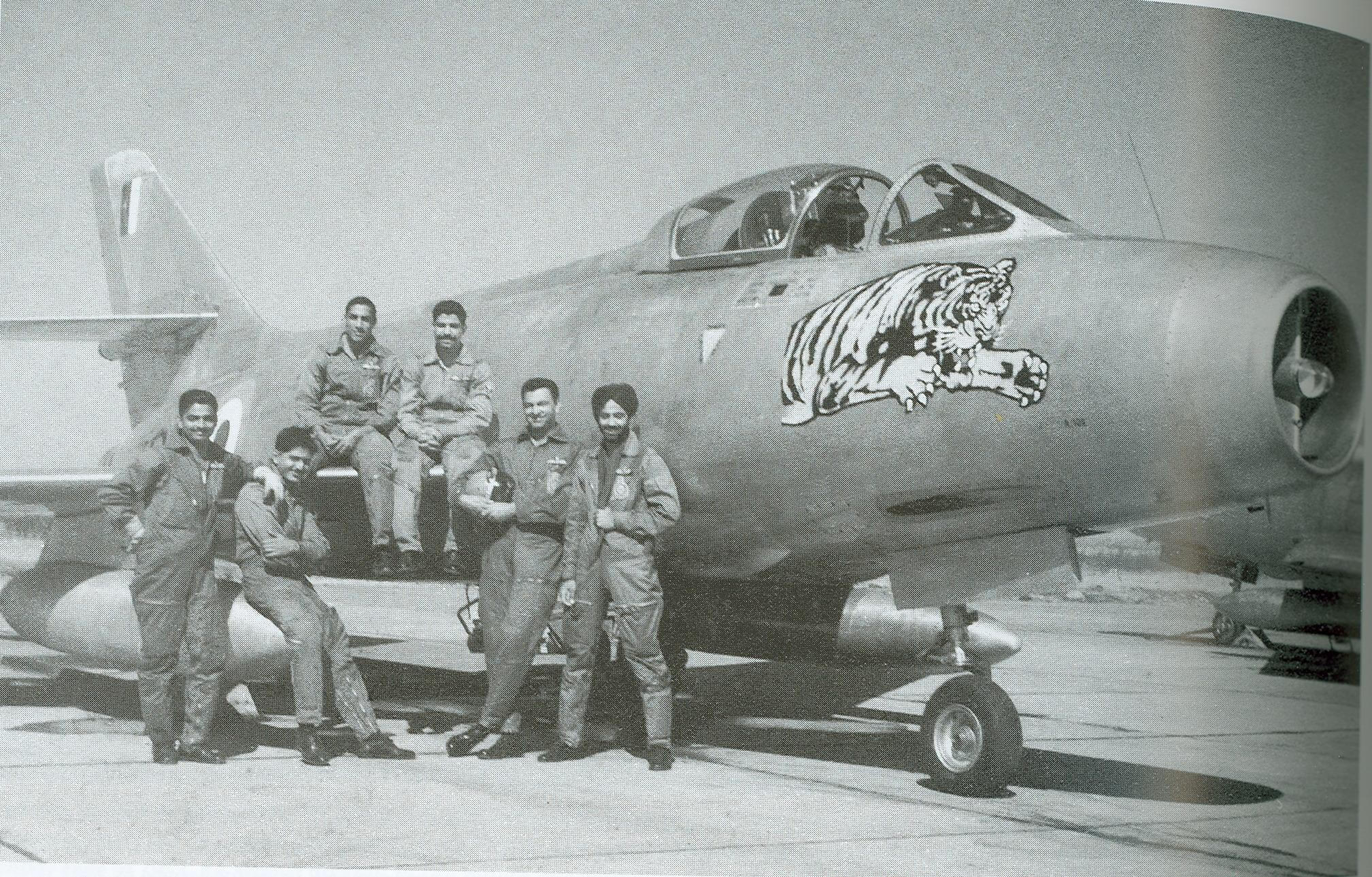
IAF pilots in front of a Mystère IV

Following Operation Polo, the Indian Air Force felt the need to procure more aircraft to replace the then rapidly ageing propeller planes such as the Supermarine Spitfires that were the mainstay of the force. Following an evaluation of American and French designs, an Airforce committee led by Group captain P.C Lal procured 110 aircraft in 1957 and used them extensively in the Indo-Pakistani War of 1965.

Equipping 5 squadrons of the Indian Air Force, Mystère IVs were employed as a ground attack aircraft during the 1965 war. The type, often accompanied by Folland Gnats providing air cover, was used extensively to provide close air support against enemy armour and artillery positions. Additionally, Mystères carried out a number of bombing missions against the Pakistani airfields, most notably on 7 September, when 3 waves of Mystères from the No.1 and No. 8 squadrons attacked Pakistan Air Force Base Sargodha (along with abandoned airfields at Bhagatanwala and Chhota Sargodha). The Indian Air Force claimed to have destroyed 6 Pakistani aircraft on the ground, including 4 F-86 Sabres and 2 F-104 Starfighters, although Pakistan only admitted to the loss of a single F-86 on the ground. While egressing as part of first wave, Squadron Leader Ajjamada B Devayya of the No. 1 squadron was shot down and killed by an F-104 Starfighter flown by Flight Lieutenant Amjad Hussain. The F-104 also subsequently crashed, having either been shot down by Devayya or having been damaged while flying through the debris of the Mystère, although its pilot ejected safely. Squadron Leader Devayya was posthumously awarded the Maha Vir Chakra in 1988.

In the only other air-to-air victory for the Mystère, Wing Commander Surapati Bhattacharya would succeed in shooting down a Pakistan Army L-19 Bird Dog over Chawinda on 16 September.

Pakistan would claim a total of 18 Mystères destroyed during this conflict, including 3 shot down in air-to-air combat, 6 shot down by anti-aircraft fire, and 9 destroyed on the ground during strikes on Indian airfields at Adampur and Pathankot. India admitted to losing only 15 Mystères during combat, attributing 3 further losses to accidents and other causes.

Despite equipping only two squadrons of the IAF during the 1971 India-Pakistan War, viz. No. 3 and No. 31 squadrons, Mystères would still see extensive service as ground attack aircraft on the western front. A total of 3 Mystères would be lost to Pakistani anti-aircraft fire in this conflict, with a further 2 being lost to accidents. The Mystère was retired from the Indian Air Force in 1974.

== Variants ==
Mystère IV
Prototype powered by a Rolls-Royce Tay 250 engine

Mystère IV A

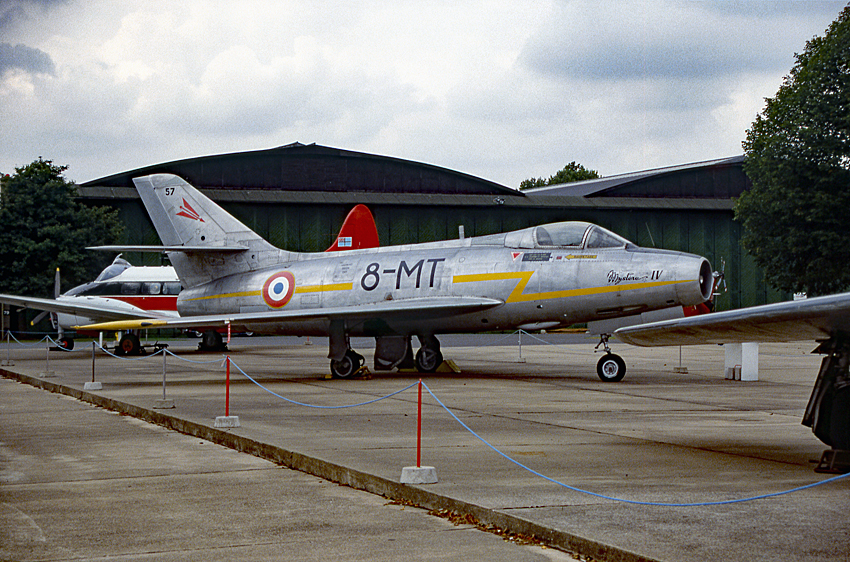
Dassault Mystère IV A 8-MT at Duxford

Production fighter-bomber, 421 built, first 50 with the Rolls-Royce Tay 250 the remaining 371 with a French derivative of the Tay, the Hispano-Suiza Verdon.

Mystère IV B
In addition to production Mystère IV A, Dassault developed an upgraded Mystère IV B with either Rolls-Royce Avon (first two prototypes) or SNECMA Atar 101 (third prototype) afterburning engine and a radar ranging gunsight. Six pre-production aircraft were built but the project was abandoned in favour of the promising Super Mystère. In 1954, French pilot Constantin Rozanoff was killed while doing a low-level flyover of this aircraft.

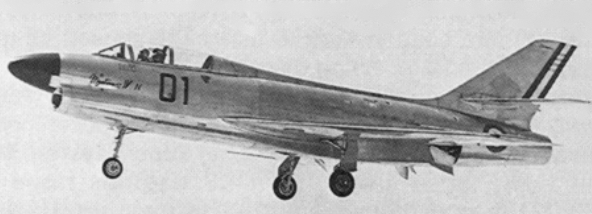
The only Mystère IV N in flight.

Mystère IV N
Dassault also proposed a two-seat all-weather interceptor version called Mystère IV N. The aircraft was equipped with the AN/APG-33 radar in an arrangement similar to North American F-86D Sabre Dog, powered by a Rolls-Royce Avon turbojet, and armed with 55× 68 mm Matra rockets in a retractable belly tray. The first prototype flew on 19 July 1954. AdA eventually decided to purchase Sud Aviation Vautour and F-86K Sabre for the interceptor role but the Mystère IV N prototype continued to fly for several years as a testbed for radar equipment.

== Operators ==
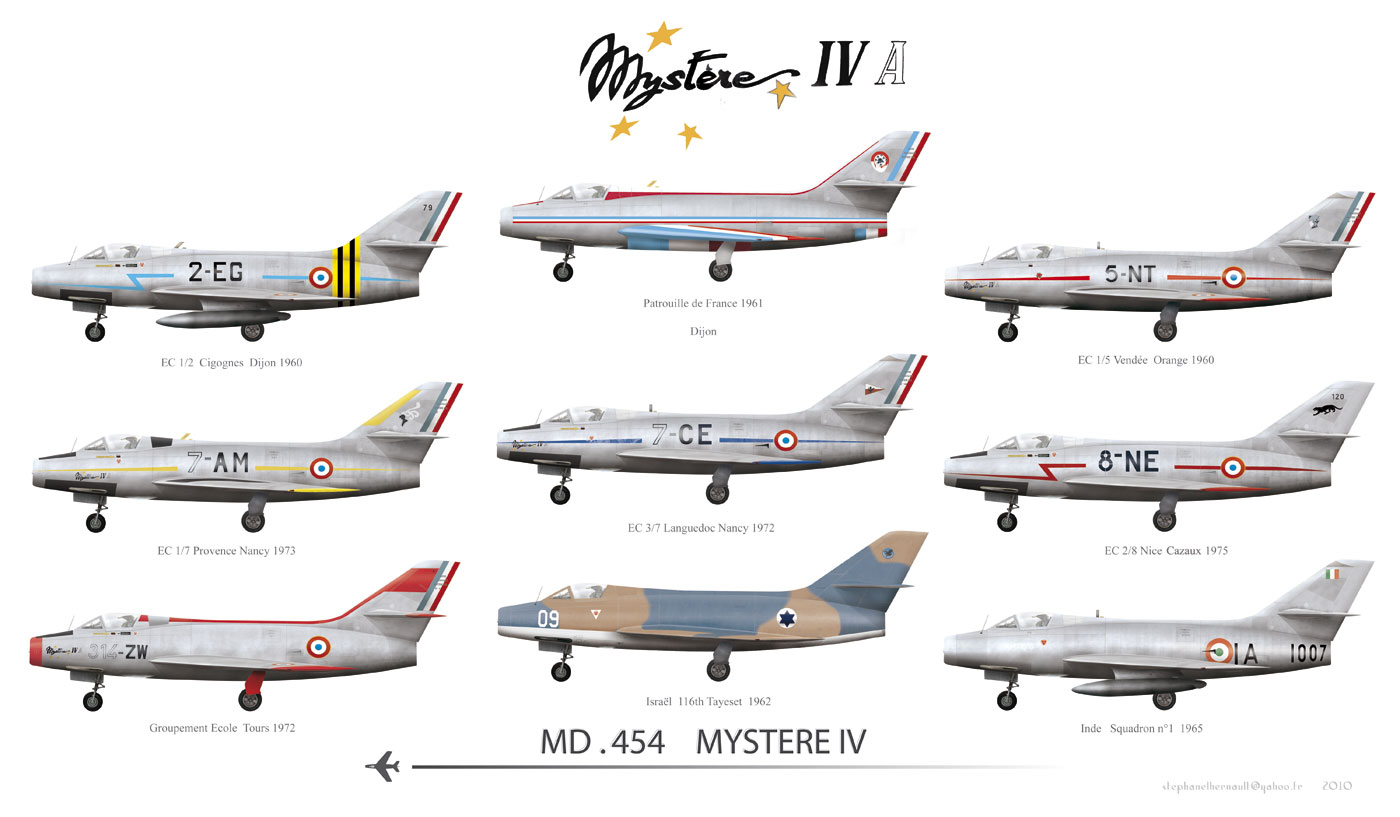
Dassault Mystère IV MD 454

France

- French Air Force, 241 delivered

India

- Indian Air Force, 110 delivered

Israel

- Israeli Air Force, 61 delivered.

== Aircraft on display ==
=== Israel ===
- 60 – Dassault Mystère IV A at the Israeli Air Force Museum.

=== United Kingdom ===
- 70 – Dassault Mystère IV A at the Midland Air Museum in Coventry.
- 79 – Dassault Mystère IV A at the Norfolk and Suffolk Aviation Museum in Flixton.
- 83 – Dassault Mystère IV A at the Newark Air Museum in Winthorpe, Nottinghamshire.
- 121 – Dassault Mystère IV A at the City of Norwich Aviation Museum in Horsham St Faith, Norfolk.
- 318 – Dassault Mystère IV A at the Dumfries and Galloway Aviation Museum in Dumfries, Scotland.

=== USA ===
- 57 – Dassault Mystère IV A at the Pima Air & Space Museum, Tucson, Arizona.

=== Poland ===
- 146 - Dassault Mystère IV A at the Polish Aviation Museum in Kraków.

=== India ===
- IA1007 – Dassault Mystère IV A at the Jahaz Chowk in Gurdaspur.

=== France ===
- 01 - Dassault Mystère IV A at Musée de l'air et de l'espace.

== Specifications (Mystère IV A) ==
Mystère IV A 3-view drawings

Data from The Complete Book of Fighters

General characteristics

- Crew: 1
- Length: 12.89 m (42 ft 3 in)
- Wingspan: 11.12 m (36 ft 6 in)
- Height: 4.6 m (15 ft 1 in)
- Wing area: 32.06 m^{2} (345.1 sq ft)
- Empty weight: 5,860 kg (12,919 lb)
- Gross weight: 8,510 kg (18,761 lb)
- Max takeoff weight: 9,500 kg (20,944 lb)
- Powerplant: 1 × Hispano-Suiza Verdon 350 turbojet engine, 34.32 kN (7,720 lbf) thrust

Performance

- Maximum speed: 1,110 km/h (690 mph, 600 kn) at sea level
- Range: 915 km (569 mi, 494 nmi) without external tanks

2,280 km (1,420 mi; 1,230 nmi) with external tanks

- Service ceiling: 15,000 m (49,000 ft)
- Rate of climb: 40 m/s (7,900 ft/min)

Armament

- Guns: 2× 30 mm (1.18 in) DEFA cannons with 150 rounds per gun
- Rockets: 55 air-to-air rockets in retractable pack
- Bombs: 1,000 kg (2,200 lb) of payload on four external hardpoints, including a variety of bombs, rockets or drop tanks

== See also ==
Related development

- Dassault Mystère
- Dassault Super Mystère

Aircraft of comparable role, configuration, and era

- CAC Sabre
- Hawker Hunter
- Mikoyan-Gurevich MiG-17
- North American F-86D Sabre
- Shenyang J-5
- Supermarine Swift

Related lists

- List of fighter aircraft
- List of military aircraft of France

Record setting pilots

- Jacqueline Auriol
