= Grifo radar =

Family of airborne radars

The Grifo radar is a family of airborne radars developed by Italian firm Leonardo S.p.A. for fighter aircraft and attack aircraft, and this family of radars includes several series.

== Pointer ==
Grifo radars trace their origin back to the Pointer series radar, which are ranging-only radars consisting of two models:

- Pointer radar: An Italian licence-produced Israeli Elta EL/M-2001B pulse Doppler ranging radar with air-to-air and air-to-ground ranging capability. Pointer radar was installed on all production AMX aircraft for the Italian and Brazilian Air Force.
- Pointer 2500 radar: Development of pointer radar with air-to-sea ranging capability added and equipped Q-5M and J-7E.

== Grifo-ASV and X ==
Grifo-ASV (anti-surface vessel) and Grifo-X radars are the first series multifunctional fire control radars of Grifo family, and consists of three line-replaceable units: transmitter, receiver/processor, and antenna.

- Grifo-ASV: also known as Griffetto P2801, is the first multifunctional fire control radar of Grifo family, and until the appearance of Grifo-7, also the smallest multifunctional fire control radar. Grifo-ASV was evaluated on an AMX-T test airframe and proposed as an upgrade, but was never acquired. The maximum range to detect a frigate sized target with radar cross-section (RCA) of a thousand square meter is 55 NM in air-to-sea mode, and the maximum range against a fighter sized target is 20 NM in air-to-air mode.
- Grifo-X: Grifo-X P2803 radar for AMX proposed upgrade is a larger-sized development of earlier Grifo-ASV and shares the system connectors with the Grifo-ASV. Unlike its predecessor Grifo-ASV which is a monopulse radar, Grifo-X is a pulse-Doppler radar with the same multi-modal flexibility as the Grifo-ASV, but with better look-up range and a limited look- down capability.

== Grifo-7/Mk-II/MG/L ==
Grifo-7 series is the smallest multifunctional fire control radar of Grifo family, and this series is designed for J-7/F-7 or MiG-21 upgrades, with over a hundred sold.

- Grifo-7: Weighing 55 kg, Grifo-7 mono-pulse radar is developed from the experience of P2801 Grifo-ASV/Griffetto, and is designed to be fitted into the nose cone of J-7/F-7/MiG-21. The only confirmed customer is Pakistan, with the radar license assembled by the ISO - 9002 certified Kamra Avionics, Electronics and Radar Factory of the Pakistan Aeronautical Complex (PAC), to arm F-7MP and early production series of F-7P fighters of Pakistani Air Force (PAF). With a range of 30 NM, the radar is compatible with IR-guided air-to-air missiles, free-fall bombs, rockets and guns.
- Grifo-Mk-II: Improvement of Grifo-7 radar in the same way Grio-ASV was developed to Grifo-X, Grifo-Mk-II is a pulse-Doppler radar upgrade of Grifo-7 monopulse radar. With weight only increased by 1 kg to 56 kg, Grifo-Mk-II has better look-down/shoot-down and ECCM capabilities than its predecessor, and it's capable of simultaneously tracking four targets and engage one of the four tracked. The sector of scan is increased from ± 10° of Grifo-7 to ± 20°. Also license assembled by Kamra factory of PAC, Grifo-Mk-II is used by PAF for its later production series F-7P fighters, and F-7MP and early production series F-7P fighters upgrades.
- Grifo-MG: Further development of Grifo-Mk-II with the sector of scan is increased from ± 20° of Grifo-Mk-II to ± 30°, and improved look-down/shoot-down and ECCM capabilities. The number of targets can be simultaneously tracked is increased from 4 of the Grifo-Mk-II to 8, and the radar can engage one of the eight targets tracked. Grifo-MG is adopted for PAF F-7PGs and Bangladesh Air Force F-7 upgrades.
- Grifo-L: this radar is designed to be fitted into the nose of Aero L-159 Alca, 24 of which are used by Draken International for aggressor training for the U.S. Department of Defense. In comparison to earlier Grifo-Mk-II, Grifo-L has the additional compatibility with IR or TV guided air-to-surface missiles (ASM) such as AGM-65 Maverick, and precision guided bombs (PGB) such as GBU-12 Paveway II. In November 2019, Leonardo S.p.A. signed a multi-year contract with Draken International to support the Grifo-L radars on L-159E used by the latter.

== Grifo-F ==
The 85 kg Grifo-F P2804 radar is designed to fit into the nose of Northrop F-5, and in comparison to earlier Grifo-L, Grifo-F is larger and has the additional compatibility with active radar guided air-to-air missiles. Grifo-F shares the same components of slightly larger Grifo-M3 radar, with the exception of its own elliptical antenna, which is unique to the space confinement of F-5. Grifo-F has been installed on Singaporean Air Force F-5s and Brazilian Air Force F-5s.

== Grifo-M ==
Grifo M P2800 series radars are larger and more powerful radars than Grifo-X, and like Grifo-F, Grifo-M also uses multi-processors for fire control, but incorporated additional compatibility with anti-ship missiles (AShM), and also has greater look-down range and better look-down capability by adopting fast Fourier transform (FFT) Doppler-filtering techniques. It also differs from Grifo-F in having circular antenna array. Grifo-M series includes 2 models:

- Grifo-M3: This 87 kg radar is designed for Dassault Mirage III upgrade with over sixty-five sold to Pakistan for PAF Mirage-IIIs upgrade under Project ROSE, including the complete radar sets at the beginning of the program and kits for local assemblies in the latter stage of the program.
- Grifo-M5: As a daytime fighter version of Mirage III, Dassault Mirage 5 lacks radar and the avionics rack behind the cockpit is relocated into the nose, with the space left behind is filled with a 470-liter fuel tank, resulting in Mirage 5 has greater range and slimmer nose than Mirage III. Grifo-M5 is designed to be fitted into the smaller nose of Mirage 5 for its upgrade market, but despite the smaller size of Grifo-M5, the avionics rack must be relocated somewhere else on the airframe of Mirage 5 to clear the room for Grifo-M5 installation, thus requiring more extensive work in comparison to earlier Grifo radars that only require simple installation/replacement, and this is a job for aircraft manufacturing and maintenance firms. As a radar house, Leonardo S.p.A. did not have the capability for airframe upgrade at the time, compounded with aging airframe of Mirage 5, despite successful flight tests, no known sale has been achieved.

== Grifo-S ==
Grifo-S is a series of large radars the Grifo family designed for medium and heavy fighters, but most of them failed to enter series production. As with earlier Grifo series in the family, models in this series also share the same components except the antenna, and due to the different sizes of antenna, the maximum range of each model also various somewhat. In comparison to earlier series, Grifo-S has the additional compatibility with semi-active radar homing air-to-air missiles, and SAR mode.

- Grifo-S1: designed for Dassault Mirage F1 & MiG-23, no known sales achieved.
- Grifo-S5: As an upgrade of earlier Mirage 5, Mirage 50 has a more powerful engine and longer nose to house the X-band Agave radar. Grifo-S5 is designed to be fitted into the more spacious nose of Mirage 50 for its upgrade market. As with earlier Grifo-M5, more extensive work is needed to relocate the avionics rack to clear the space for Grifo-S5 installation on Mirage 50, and for the same reason, no known sales were achieved despite successful flight tests as Venezuela, one of the only two foreign users of Mirage 50, retired its aging Mirage 50 fleet, and Chile, selected Israeli EL/M-2032 for upgrade.
- Grifo-S7: The only model in the Grifo-S series entered series production, with eight units delivered to China and Pakistan for prototypes and pre-production series JF-17, but is also reported available for installation on Guizhou JL-9.

The general performance of Grifo S series is:

- Weight: < 120 kg
- Power: 560 W
- Cooling: air
- Scan: ± 60°
- MTBF: > 220 hrs
- Detection range: > 50 NM in air-to-air mode
- Tracking range: > 40 NM
- Target tracking: 10 targets simultaneously tracked, 8 of the 10 displayed
- SAR resolution: better than 1 meter

== Grifo-2000/16 ==
Grifo-2000/16 is a pin-to-pin replacement of the APG-66 radar and has similar performance such as maximum range of 150 km. The radar has an elliptical antenna of 74 cm x 48 cm, and the radar is fully interchangeable with APG-66 at LRU level. Grifo-2000/16 was offered to Pakistan if Pakistan decided to purchase Chengdu J-10, which did not materialize, and the radar thus did not enter series production.

== Grifo-346 ==
Grifo-346 is a radar designed for Alenia Aermacchi M-346 Master. In comparison to earlier radars, Grifo-346 incorporates SAR and ISAR modes. Specification:

- Weight: < 100 kg
- Power: 200 W
- Cooling: air
- Scan: ± 60°
- MTBF: > 220 hrs
- Detection range: > 60 NM in air-to-air mode
- Tracking range: > 50 NM
- Target tracking: 10 targets simultaneously tracked, 8 of the 10 displayed

== Grifo-E ==
Grifo-E is a series of radars utilizing AESA. Models in this series only differs in antenna size, and thus with different ranges. Grifo-E was reportedly under consideration by Pakistan in 2020 for its JF-17 Block III fighter. Specification:

- Weight: 106 – 160 kg
- Power: 200 W
- Cooling: air or liquid
- Scan: > ± 60°
- Detection range: 45 – 85 NM in air-to-air mode
- Tracking range: 40 – 75 NM
- Target tracking: 24 targets simultaneously tracked

== Operators ==
Bangladesh Air Force (32)

- 16 Grifo-MG (variant of Grifo-7) for Chengdu J-7MG (deliveries 2006)
- 16 Grifo-MG (variant of Grifo-7) for Chengdu J-7MG (deliveries 2011)

(Brazil) Brazilian Air Force (49)

- 46 Grifo-F for modernisation of Northrop F-5E to F-5M (deliveries 2006–2013)
- 3 Grifo-F for modernisation of Northrop F-5E to F-5M (deliveries 2014–2017)

Czech Republic (70)

- 70 Grifo-L for Aero L-159A (deliveries 2000–2004)
  - 24 in use with the Czech Air Force
  - 15 in use with the Iraqi Air Force
  - 21 in use with Draken International, private contractor providing training with the L-159 to the Royal Air Force and the US Air Force
  - The rest in storage, or sold to private collector but without the radar and weapon systems

(Namibia) Namibian Air Force (8)

- 8 Grifo-MG (variant of Grifo-7) for Chengdu J-7NM (deliveries 2011)

(Nigeria) Nigerian Air Force (24 on order)

- 24 Grifo-346 for Alenia Aermacchi M-346 FA (ordered in 2023)

Pakistan Air Force (192)

- 35 Grifo-7 for Mirage III modernisation (deliveries 2000–2004)
- 100 Grifo-7 for Chengdu J-7P (deliveries 2000–2004)
- 57 Grifo-MG (variant of Grifo-7) for Pakistani made Chengdu J-7MG (deliveries 2002)

Singapore Air Force (40)

- 40 Grifo-F for modernisation of Northrop F-5E to F-5S/T (deliveries 2014–2017)

(Turkmenistan) Turkmen Air Force (4)

- 4 Grifo-346 for Alenia Aermacchi M-346 FA (deliveries 2021)
