= No. 22 Squadron PAF =

Pakistani air force unit

No. 22 Squadron
- Active: Since June 1984 (41 years, 2 months)
- Country: Pakistan
- Allegiance: Pakistan Air Force
- Branch: GD(P)/Flying
- Type: Squadron
- Role: OCU
- Airbase: PAF Base Masroor
- Nickname(s): Ghazis
- Engagements: Operation Sentinel; Operation Swift Retort

Aircraft flown
- Trainer: Dassault Mirage-IIIEL/DL (ex-Lebanese); Dassault Mirage-IIIDF; Dassault Mirage-VDD (dual seaters)

The No. 22 OCU also known by their nickname Ghazis is an Operational conversion unit of the Pakistan Air Force. Based at PAF Base Masroor, the squadron converts crews onto Dassault Mirage III and Mirage V jets.

== History ==
22 OCU was established in June 1984 after 9 Squadron (which was previously responsible for Mirage conversion) was re-equipped with F-16s. 22 OCU inherited all the Mirages and related assets of No. 9 Squadron and initiated undertaking conversion courses for the Mirages. The 16th Operational Conversion Course was the first to graduate from the unit.

The unit's initial aircraft inventory consisted of Pakistan specific Mirage variants built by Dassault Aviation. They included the single seat Mirage-VPA and Mirage-VPA2s along with dual seat Mirage-IIIDP variants. In 1993, as part of Project ROSE, the unit swapped its assets and aircraft with 7 Squadron's ex-Aussie Mirage-IIIEAs and dual seat Mirage-IIIDA to undertake their upgradation at Pakistan Aeronautical Complex (PAC). During this period, the OCU also conducted many conversion courses on the Aussie Mirages. By 1997, the unit started shifting them back to 7 Squadron after completion of upgradations with the Mirage-VPA/PA2s being transferred back to 22 OCU which it continued operating till early 2001 when they were allotted to 15 Squadron following which it received single seat Mirage-VEFs which were purchased from France under Blue Flash-VI. The unit while undertaking conversion courses on these mirages also managed their upgradation at PAC Kamra under Project ROSE which started from 2004. The ex-French mirages were replaced with ex-Lebanese Mirages which were procured under Blue Flash-VII program.

Owing to increased bird activity and resulting bird strikes which had caused some aircraft losses at Masroor airbase in 2008, the squadron was shifted to PAF Base Shahbaz until the bird problems at Masroor were resolved. After a brief stay at Jacobabad, the squadron shifted back to its home base. As of now, the OCU operates ex-Lebanese (IIIEL/DL) and ex-French (IIIDF and VDD) mirage variants and continues to take part in all operational activities and exercises of the PAF.

=== Operational history ===
As part of PAF's Operation Sentinel during the 2001–2002 India–Pakistan standoff, several Flight instructor and Mirages from the 22 OCU were assigned to various PAF combat squadrons.

== See also ==
- List of Pakistan Air Force aircraft squadrons
