= No. 25 Squadron PAF =

Flying squadron of the Pakistan Air Force

No. 25 Squadron Eagles
- Active: Since January 1966; 60 years ago
- Country: Pakistan
- Allegiance: Pakistan Armed Forces
- Branch: Pakistan Air Force
- Role: Night Strike
- Part of: Central Air Command; No. 34 Tactical Attack Wing
- Airbase: PAF Base Rafiqui
- Nickname: Night Strike Eagles
- Mottos: فضاؤں میں ہیبت کی یلغار ہم (Urdu for 'We are the onslaught of terror in the sky')
- Mascot: An Eagle
- Aircraft: Dassault Mirage-5EF ROSE-II
- Engagements: Indo-Pakistani War of 1971; Battle of Shakargarh; Operation Bedaar; Chagai-I; Chagai-II; War on terror

Commanders
- Notable commanders: Imtiaz Bhatti; Mushaf Ali Mir

Insignia
- Patch

Aircraft flown
- Attack: Dassault Mirage 5EF ROSE-II
- Fighter: Shenyang F-6C
- Trainer: Shenyang FT-6

The No. 25 Squadron, nicknamed Eagles, is a tactical attack squadron from the No. 34 Wing of the Pakistan Air Force's Central Air Command. It is currently deployed at Rafiqui Airbase and operates ROSE upgraded Dassault Mirage-5EF aircraft.

== History ==
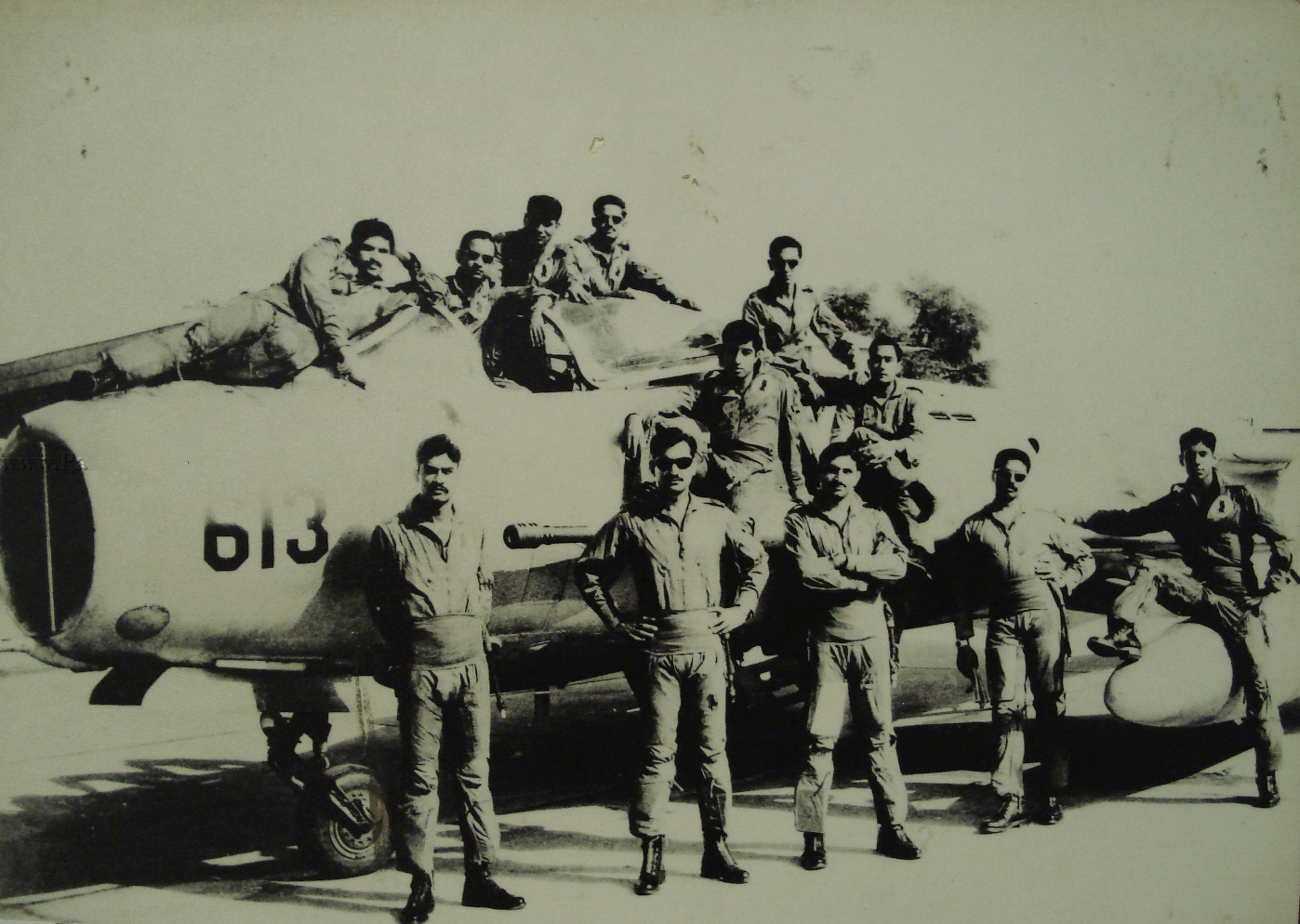
Pilots of the No. 25 Squadron with their OC Sqn Ldr. Imtiaz Bhatti in 1968.

The No. 25 Squadron was raised in January 1966 at Sargodha Airbase under the command of Wing Commander Tawab (who later rose to command the BAF) and was one of the first two PAF squadrons to be equipped with the newly inducted Shenyang F-6 fighters; the other being the No. 23 Squadron "Talons". The squadron was tasked with Fighter conversion duties after which the squadron trained a large number of pilots on the Shenyang F-6.

In 1967, the squadron took part in a large firepower demonstration in honour of the Shah of Iran while in 1968, the squadron presented an aerobatics display for the Soviet defence minister "Andrei Grechko". The squadron under the leadership of Squadron Leader Imtiaz Bhatti also won the 1968 Inter squadron armament competition.

Later in 1980, the squadron received a batch of Shenyang FT-6 trainer jets to facilitate their training program. 6 years later it was shifted to Mianwali Airbase to replace the 14 OCU which had been selected as PAF's third F-16 squadron. The No. 25 Squadron performed its OCU duties till 1995 when it was nominated for the Dassault Mirage 5EF ROSE-IIs after which its assets were transferred to the No. 17 and No. 23 Squadrons which were based at Samungli.

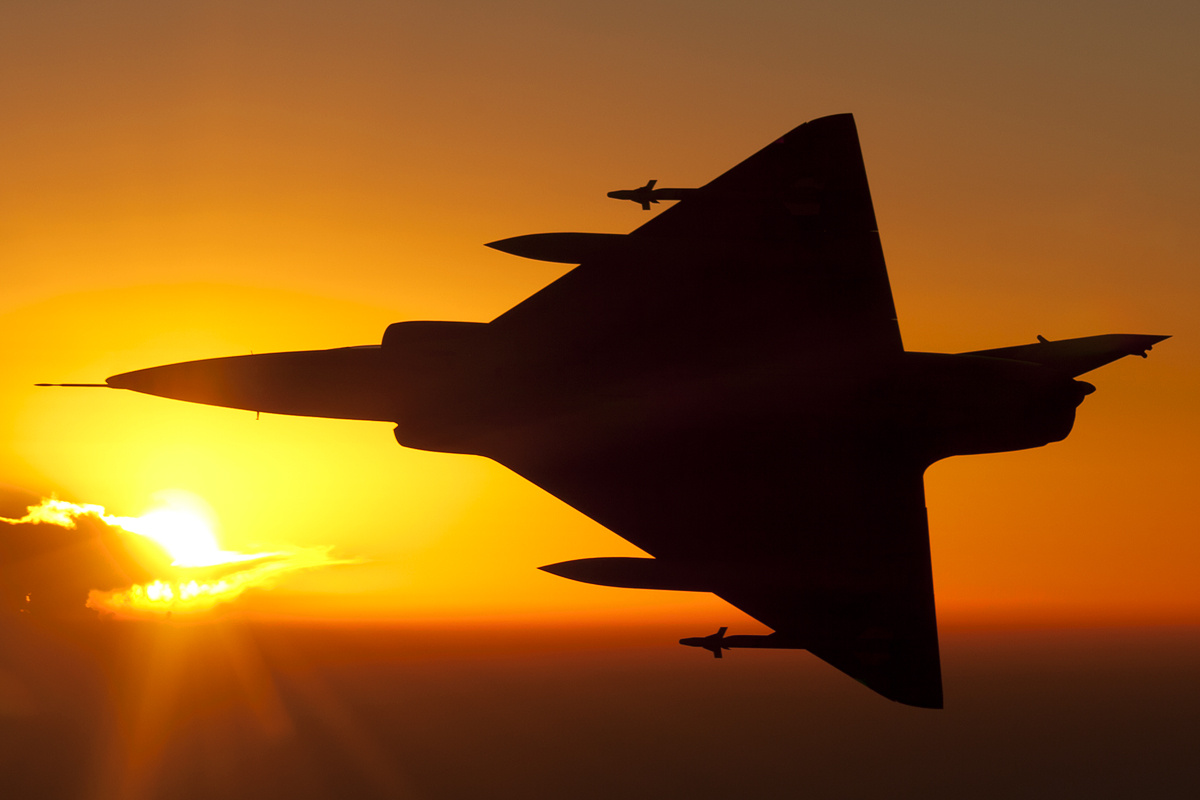
A Dassault Mirage-5EF ROSE-II of the No. 25 Squadron silhouetted against the sunset.

After the squadron's last F-6 had taken off for Samungli Airbase, it was transferred to Minhas where it started trials for upgraded Mirage 5s under Project ROSE. Upon receiving its first batch of ROSE-II upgraded Mirages from Dassault in September 1998, it was designated as a Tactical Attack (TA) squadron and assigned the Night Strike role.

=== Operational history ===
==== 1971 War ====
After hostilities broke out in 1971, the squadron was one of three PAF units operating F-6 fighters. The No. 25 Squadron was on high alert since the Indian invasion in East Pakistan and flew several Combat Air Patrol & Close Air Support sorties throughout the war. On 4 December, Flight Lieutenant Syed Shahid Raza shot down a Hawker Hunter near Murid Airbase. On 5 December, the Officer Commanding; Wing Commander Saad A. Hatmi and his wingman Flight Lieutenant Javed Qazi each chased down an Indian Hawker Hunter and shot them down over Sakesar. All of the Indian warplanes belonged to the No. 27 Squadron IAF.

Later during the Battle of Shakargarh, the squadron flew several CAS missions against Indian forces invading the Shakargarh area of Pakistan during which an F-6 flown by Flight Lieutenant Syed Shahid Raza was lost to enemy ground fire, though he was seen ejecting, Raza was never found and declared MIA by the PAF. He was later awarded the Tamgha-i-Jurat.

==== Operation Bedaar ====
In the 1990s, while based at Samungli Airbase, the Squadron provided vital air defence to Pakistan's nuclear assets notably from Indian and Israeli attacks. After the Chagai-II nuclear detonations, the mission was accomplished.

==== War on terror ====
The No. 25 Squadron while equipped with Dassault Mirage 5EF ROSE-IIs took active part in the KPK Insurgency. The Close Air Support provided by the squadron's Mirages in several Counterinsurgency operations by the Government of Pakistan in the former FATA regions played an important role in flushing out most of the terrorist groups.

==== 2019 Air Alert ====
In 2019, Pakistan launched Operation Swift Retort against various Indian military targets in Indian Held Kashmir. The heightened tensions between the two countries resulted in the No. 25 Squadron along with other squadrons being put on high alert exercises. In one of these exercises, the Squadron's Dassault Mirage-IIIDP jets performed runway operations on the M1 Motorway.

== Aircraft flown ==
No. 25 Squadron Eagles
Role	Operational	Aircraft	Notes
Air Superiority	1966–1995	Shenyang F-6C	
Tactical Attack	1996–Present	Dassault Mirage-5EF ROSE-II	

== Notable Officers and Commanders ==
The following is a list of known Officer Commanders (OCs) and notable officers of No. 25 Squadron

Rank	Name	From	To
Wing Commander	Muhammad Ghulam Tawab	January 1966	unknown
Squadron Leader	Syed Khalid Hasan Wasti	1971	4 December 1971
Squadron Leader	Imtiaz Bhatti	unknown	unknown
Wing Commander	Saad A. Hatmi	unknown	unknown
Wing Commander	Malik Nazar Hussein	July 1988	October 1988
Wing Commander	Yalmaz Arshi	October 1988	January 1990
Wing Commander	Shahid Nisar Khan	January 1990	July 1991
Wing Commander	Naeem Ashraf	July 1991	July 1993
Wing Commander	Tahir Ehsan Malik	July 1993	December 1994
Wing Commander	Zafar Yasin	December 1994	June 1997
Wing Commander	Waqar Haider	June 1997	February 1999
Wing Commander	Jawed Ahmed	February 1999	July 2000
Wing Commander	Abrar Ghalib	July 2000	December 2001
Wing Commander	Tariq Nazir	December 2001	April 2003
Wing Commander	M Ilyas Sultan	April 2003	July 2004
Wing Commander	Aamir Bin Naeem	Jul-2004	December 2005
Wing Commander	Hamid Randhawa	December 2005	unknown

== See also ==
- List of Pakistan Air Force squadrons
  - No. 27 Squadron PAF
- No. 25 Squadron RAF
- VFA-25
