= Imtiaz Bhatti =

Pakistan Air Force officer and cyclist (1933–2024)

His Excellency Air Commodore Imtiaz Ahmed Bhatti SJ SI(M) SBt
- Born: 18 April 1933; Gujrat, British India
- Died: 2 July 2024 (aged 91)
- Military career
- Allegiance: Pakistan
- Branch: Pakistan Air Force
- Service years: 1953–1988
- Rank: Air Commodore
- Service number: Pak/3757
- Unit: No. 15 Squadron
- Commands: No. 19 Squadron; No. 25 Squadron PAF
- Conflicts: Indo-Pakistani War of 1965; Indo-Pakistani War of 1971
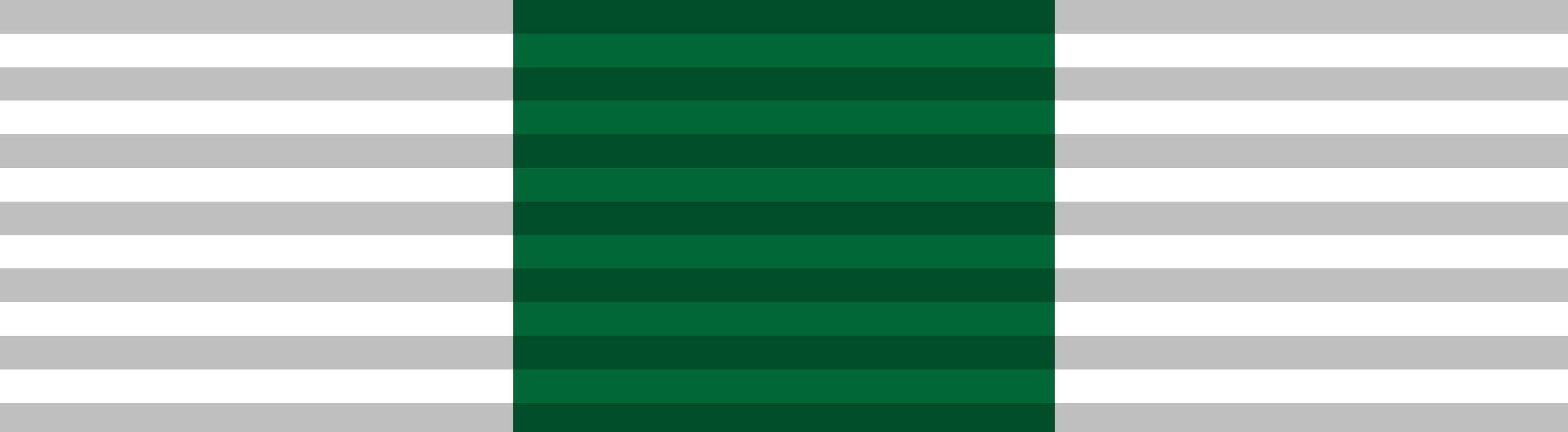
- Awards: Sitara-e-Jurat Sitara-e-Imtiaz (Military) Sitara-e-Basalat

Imtiaz Bhatti SJ SI(M) SBt (18 April 1933 – 2 July 2024) was a Pakistani cyclist and Air Force pilot and officer.

Bhatti was the Pakistan cycling champion during his student days at Punjab Agriculture College, Lyallpur (now University of Agriculture, Faisalabad) in late 1940s and early 1950s. He set national cycling records and represented Pakistan in the individual and team road race events at the 1952 Summer Olympics where he was placed 1st among the Asian cyclists and 25th in the world in the 1000 m time trial. Bhatti a veteran of the Indo-Pakistani War of 1965 flew 34 combat missions, the maximum from Pakistan during the war and is credited with confirmed downing of two Indian planes and damaging a third, in addition to participating in raids that destroyed the Amritsar radar and various other air defence and ground support missions.

== Career ==
=== Service with the Air Force ===
After completing his postgraduate studies at Punjab Agriculture College, he joined the Pakistan Air Force in 1953, where he was commissioned as an officer and had a distinguished career before retiring as an air commodore in 1988. Due to his distinguished acts of gallantry, valor and courage shown during war while performing duty and meritorious service, he was awarded the Sitara-e-Jurat, Sitara-e-Imtiaz (Military) and Sitara-e-Basalat by the Government of Pakistan and declared a legend by the PAF Falcons and is one of the war heroes to whom tribute is paid on Pakistan Defence Day.

==== 1965 war ====
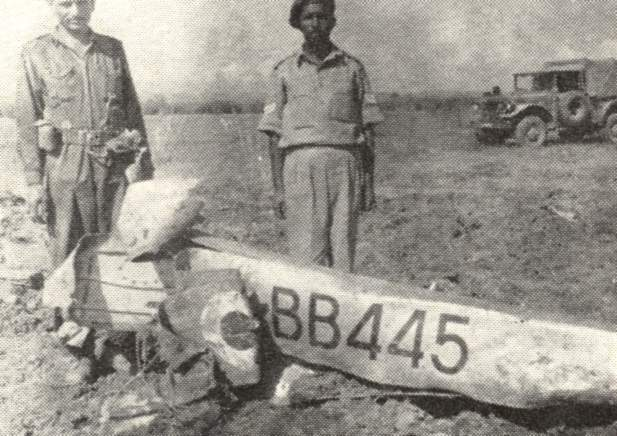
Wreckage of one of the four Indian Vampire aircraft, which were shot down on 1 September 1965

On 1 September 1965, Sargodha Airbase was assigned an Air Defence Alert mission. Bhatti who was a flight lieutenant in No. 15 Squadron at Sargodha at that time. After completing his regular duty 0400–1200 hours, he asked to be allowed to continue for another shift. Squadron Leader Sarfaraz Rafique commander of No. 5 Squadron, accompanied him on the mission, which started around 1700 hours. On getting airborne, they were directed by the Pakistani radar at Sakesar to the Sialkot-Chamb axis, from where they vectored to Chamb-Jaurian. Once there, the two started visual search not only for the attacking aircraft, but also for the PAF C-in-C, who was reported to be making an on-site assessment of the battle in a T-37. Bhatti first spotted two Vampires crossing 3–4,000 ft underneath and informed S/L Rafique, who immediately went after the two spotted planes. Bhatti, instead of flying as a traditional wingman, broke away and sighted more Indian aircraft. Before he could go after them, he saw two more Vampires that were trying to get into position behind Rafique. He called Rafique to break and himself took care of the other two that were following Rafique.

According to the Government of Pakistan citation:

Flight Lieutenant Imtiaz Ahmad Bhatti was one of the two pilots who were on an air patrol when they were directed to intercept enemy aircraft attacking our ground forces in Chamb area. This was the first air encounter of the Indo-Pakistan War. Though heavily outnumbered, Flight Lieutenant Bhatti fought with exceptional courage and professional skill and shot down two Vampire aircraft in this engagement. This set an inspiring example for others to emulate. For his gallantry, determination and dedication to the Service he is awarded Sitara-i-Jur'at.

On 13 September, in an encounter between PAF F-86 Sabres from Sargodha and IAF Gnats from No. 2 Squadron, an Indian Gnat flown by Flt. Lt. A.N. Kale was shot down by Flt. Lt. Yusaf Ali Khan, although Kale managed to eject safely. The other Gnat, flown by Squadron Leader N. K. Malik, was engaged and damaged in air combat by Flt. Lt. Bhatti. The experienced Malik somehow managed to return to his base, but according to All India Radio the Gnat's pilot later died of wounds sustained during the combat while attempting to land. His funeral was attended by the Indian President. Yusaf Ali Khan was credited with a kill, while Bhatti was only credited with damaging a Gnat, despite later confirmation that Malik had died of his wounds and his Gnat had crashed.

==== 1971 War ====
After Bhatti was promoted to the rank of squadron leader, he commanded No. 25 Squadron from 1968 to 1970, flying Shenyang FT-6s fighter/trainer jets. When the Indo-Pakistani War of 1971 broke out, he kept serving with his squadron while stationed at Sargodha Airbase.

==== Later years ====
After the war, Bhatti was given command of No. 19 Squadron of PAF; he led the squadron from 1973 to 1974.

=== Service with the Ministry of Foreign Affairs ===
After leaving PAF, he served as Ambassador / High Commissioner of Pakistan for Burundi, Madagascar, Malawi and Tanzania from 1990 until 1992.

=== Retirement and death ===
After returning from his ambassadorial duty, he happily settled in Sargodha, looking after family farmlands in the districts of Jhang and Sargodha concentrating on growing citrus and guava orchards, bamboo and forest plantations besides various food crops.

Bhatti died on 2 July 2024, at the age of 91.

== Awards and decorations ==
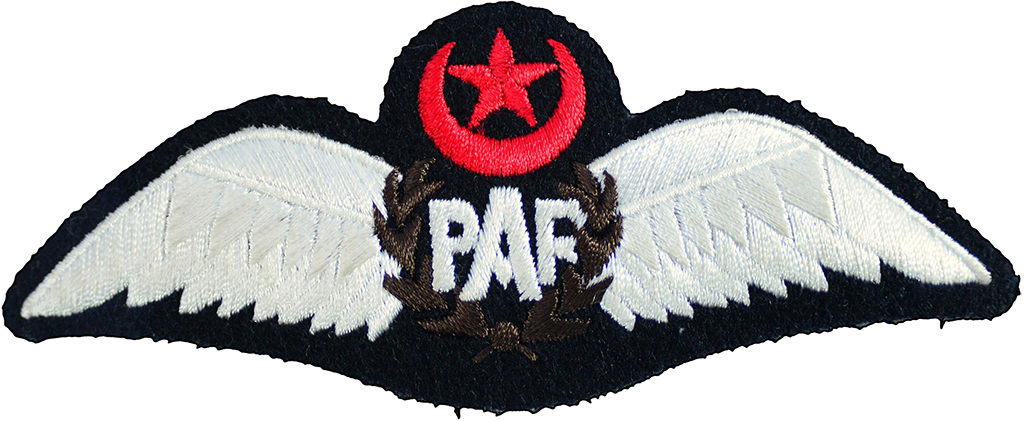

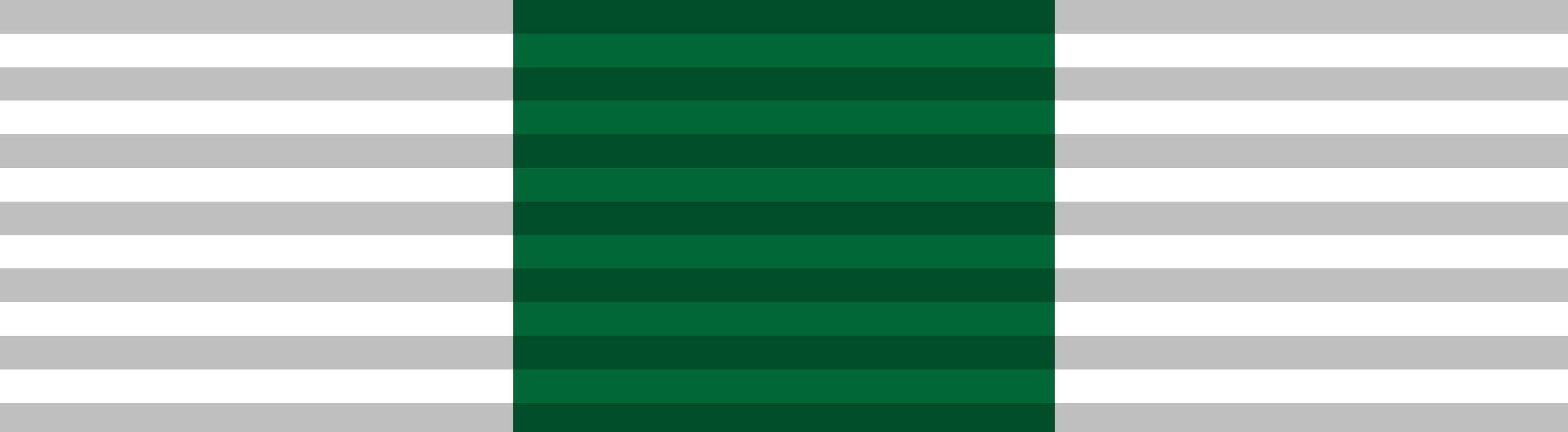

PAF GD(P) Badge RED (More than 3000 Flying Hours)
Sitara-e-Jurat (Star of Courage)	Sitara-e-Imtiaz (Military) (Star of Excellence)		Sitara-e-Basalat (Star of Good Conduct)
Tamgha-e-Diffa (General Service Medal): 1. 1965 War Clasp; 2. 1971 War Clasp	Sitara-e-Harb 1965 War (War Star 1965)	Sitara-e-Harb 1971 War (War Star 1971)	Tamgha-e-Jang 1965 War (War Medal 1965)
Tamgha-e-Jang 1971 War (War Medal 1971)	Tamgha-e-Sad Saala Jashan-e- Wiladat-e-Quaid-e-Azam (100th Birth Anniversary of Muhammad Ali Jinnah) 1976	Tamgha-e-Jamhuria (Republic Commemoration Medal) 1956	Hijri Tamgha (Hijri Medal) 1979

== Sitara-e-Jurat Citation ==
For his actions in the 1965 war, Bhatti was awarded the Sitara-e-Jurat, which is the third highest gallantry award of Pakistan.

Flt Lt. Imtiaz Ahmed Bhatti

15 Squadron PAK/3757

Flight Lieuteanat Imtiaz Ahmad Bhatti was one of the two pilots who were on an air patrol when they were directed to intercept enemy aircraft attacking our ground forces in Chamb area. This was the first air encounter of the Indo-Pakistan War. Though heavily out-numbered, Flight Lieutenant Bhatti fought with exceptional courage and professional skill and shot down two Vampire aircraft in this engagement. This set an inspiring example for others to emulate. For his gallantry, determination and dedication to the Service he was awarded Sitara-i-Juraat.
