= Sarfaraz Ahmed Rafiqui =

Pakistani fighter pilot (1935-1965)

Squadron Leader Sarfaraz Ahmed Rafiqui HJ SJ
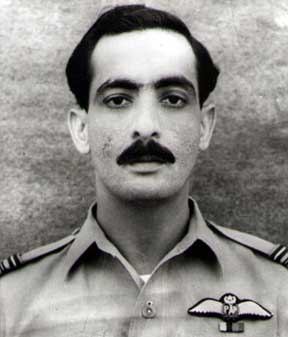
- Official portrait as squadron leader
- Born: 18 July 1935; Rajshahi, Bengal Presidency, British India
- Died: 6 September 1965 (aged 30); Halwara, Punjab, India
- Burial place: Lahore, Punjab, Pakistan
- Alma mater: St. Anthony High School, Lahore; Pakistan Air Force Academy
- Military career
- Allegiance: Pakistan
- Branch: Pakistan Air Force
- Service years: 1953–1965
- Rank: Squadron Leader
- Nickname: Mani
- Service number: PAK/1429
- Unit: No.5 Squadron
- Commands: No.14 squadron
- Conflicts: Indo-Pakistani War of 1965; Air war operations; Operation Grand Slam; Halwara Airstrikes †
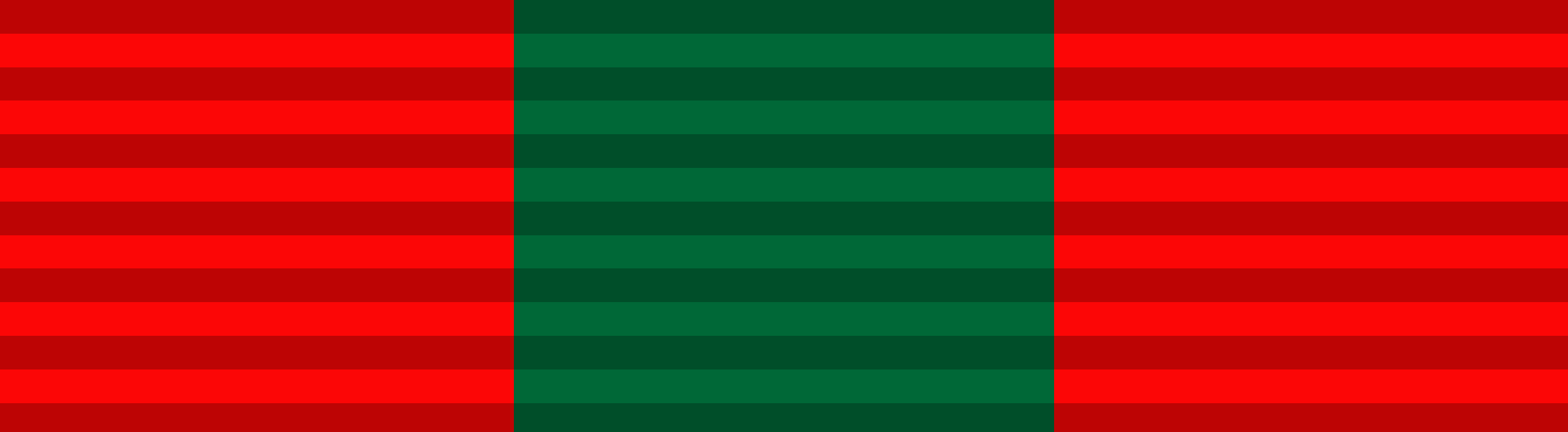
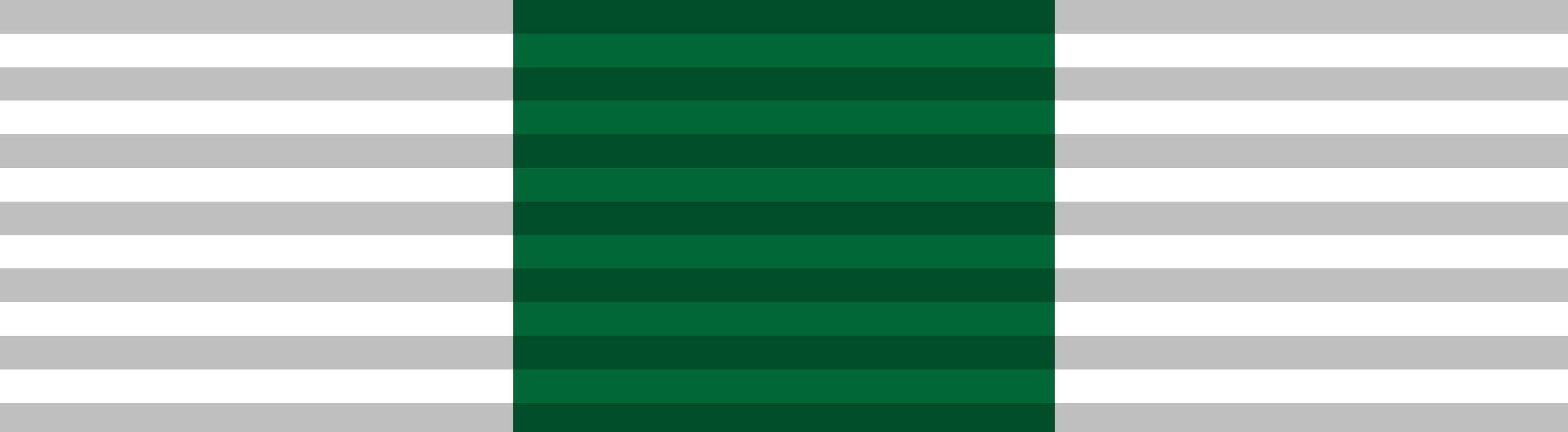
- Awards: Hilal-e-Jurat Sitara-e-Jurat

Sarfaraz Ahmed Rafiqui HJ SJ (18 July 1935 – 6 September 1965) was a Pakistani fighter pilot, best known for his gallant actions in two of the aerial dogfights during the Indo-Pakistani War of 1965. He is a recipient of both the 'Hilal-e-Jurat' (Crescent of Courage) and the 'Sitara-e-Jurat' (Star of Courage) military awards from the Government of Pakistan.

He is considered as one of the most decorated officers of the Pakistan Air Force as he had the honour to be awarded with the second and third highest gallantry award. He was buried at Lahore, Pakistan.

== Early life ==
Sarfraz Ahmed Rafiqui was born in Rajshahi, British India (present-day Bangladesh) on 18 July 1935. He had three brothers and a sister. He started his education at St. Anthony High School, Lahore, matriculating from Government High School, Multan in 1948. With the transfer of his father to Karachi, he joined D. J. Sindh Government Science College.

== Military career ==
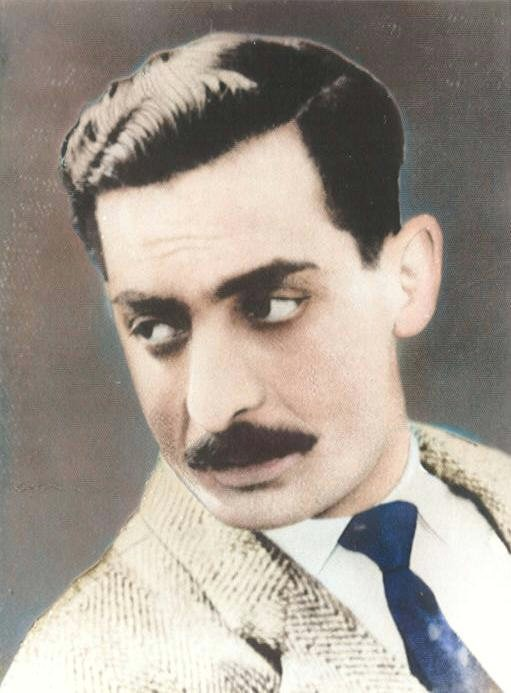
Sarfaraz in his 20s.

Inspired by his elder brother "Ijaz Rafique", Sarfaraz joined the Royal Pakistan Air Force's 13th GDP course and graduated from Risalpur Academy in 1953.

In 1962, he was appointed as the Officer Commanding of the No. 14 Squadron which was based in Tejgaon Airport at East Pakistan (Present day Bangladesh). In 1963, he was posted at PAF Base Sargodha to lead the PAF's No. 5 Squadron which he would command until his death.

=== 1965 War ===
==== Air battle over Chhamb ====
On the evening of 1 September 1965, the Indian Air Force (IAF) intervened in the Chhamb Sector by sending 26 aircraft (12 de Havilland Vampires and 14 Mystere IVs) to slow down the Pakistan Army's XII Division's offensive against Akhnoor in response to a call for help from the Indian Army. The IAF's 45 Squadron was ordered to provide close air support to Indian forces in the area. These 26 planes flying in finger-four formation strafed Pakistani positions and attacked Pakistani tanks and ground targets. The Pakistan Air Force (PAF) scrambled two F-86 Sabres, flown by S/L Sarfraz Rafiqui of No. 5 Squadron and F/L Imtiaz Bhatti of No. 15 Squadron from PAF Base Sargodha to intercept them. Though heavily outnumbered, the two pilots engaged the Indians and in the ensuing dogfight over Chhamb, each pilots shot down two de Havilland Vampires. Rafiqui had taken on the flight leader and wingman while Bhatti went after an element leader and element wingman.

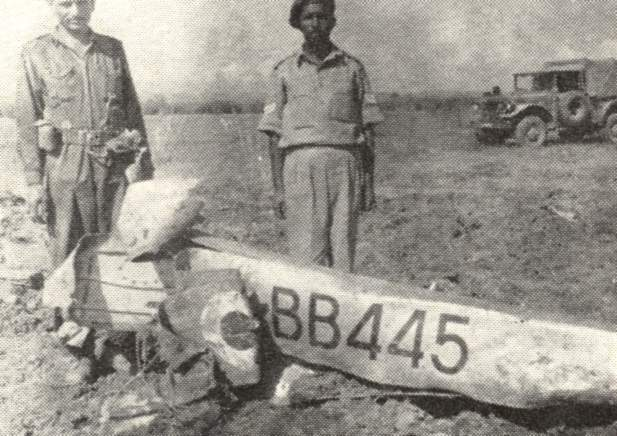
Wreckage of one of the IAF De Havilland Vampires shot down by Rafiqui or Bhatti

India acknowledged losing four airplanes, all Vampires, flown by Squadron Leader Aspi Kekobad Bhagwagar (flight leader), Flight Lieutenant Vijay Madhav Joshi (element leader), Flight Lieutenant Satish Bharadwaj (element wingman) and Flight Lieutenant (later Group Captain) Shrikrishna Vishnu Phatak (wingman). Both PAF pilots were credited with two victories each and were awarded the Sitara-e-Jurrat. This dogfight was a major blow to the IAF; it had to remove all Vampires from frontline service.

==== Halwara airstrike and subsequent death ====
On 6 September 1965, in response to India's invasion of Pakistan, the Pakistan Air Force launched an aggressive airstrike campaign on several Indian Air Force stations. Sarfaraz Rafiqui was tasked to lead a formation of three F-86 Sabres to strike the IAF's Halwara Air Base, with Flight Lieutenant Khawaja Yunus Hussain as his number 2 and Flight Lieutenant Cecil Chaudhry as his number 3. The formation took off from Sargodha and headed towards Halwara. On the way, the formation met up with Squadron Leader Muhammad Mahmood Alam's formation, which was returning from an aborted raid on the IAF's Adampur Air Force Station. Alam informed them about his encounter with four Indian Hawker Hunters over Tarn Taran (Alam had shot down one of them, while the rest managed to escape). Rafiqui's formation continued on and reached the Halwara base in the evening, where the remaining three Hunters from the earlier encounter with MM Alam's formation were taxiing after landing. Just as Rafiqui was positioning himself for a strafing run, two IAF Hunters (flown by Flight Officers P. S. Pingale and A. R. Gandhi) on Combat Air Patrol intercepted his formation. Rafiqui quickly aborted his strafing run and engaged Pingale. He manoeuvred behind the Hunter and shot it down. Rafiqui then engaged Gandhi's Hunter, scoring several hits on the enemy plane, when suddenly his Sabre's machine guns jammed. He then radioed Cecil Chaudhry and said, "Cecil, my guns have stopped firing, you have the lead."

While Rafiqui was positioning himself as Cecil's wingman, Gandhi managed to get behind Rafiqui, but failed to score any hits. Minutes later, Gandhi was shot down by Cecil as he came to Rafiqui's aid. Since the formation was low on fuel and daylight, along with Rafiqui's jammed guns, they decided to head back to base, but were suddenly bounced by two more IAF Hunters (flown by Flight Lieutenant D. N. Rathore and Flighy Officer V. K. Neb). Rathore attacked Rafiqui, while Neb engaged Younas. In the ensuing dogfight, both Rafiqui and Younas were shot down, while Cecil Chaudhry managed to escape. Rathore, who had ambushed Rafiqui, scored several hits on Rafiqui's Sabre, which suddenly banked sharply to the left and then crashed into the ground near the village of Heren, which was around six miles away from Halwara. He was declared missing in action by the Pakistan Air Force, but after his absence in prisoner exchanges after the war, the PAF officially declared him as killed in action. According to reports, Rafiqui is buried in an unmarked grave near Halwara.

== Honors and legacy ==
Rafiqui was posthumously awarded the Hilal-e-Jurat and the Sitara-e-Jurat.

The Pakistan Air Force's third largest air base, PAF Base Shorkot, was renamed as PAF Base Rafiqui in his honour. One of the largest roads of the Lahore Cantonment is named Sarfaraz Rafiqui Road, and Rafiqui Shaheed Road in Karachi is also named after him. At PAF Base Peshawar, the road on which the Rear Air Headquarters and Fazaia Degree School & College are located is named Rafiqui Lane in honour of the war hero.

== Government's gesture for parents ==
The Government of Pakistan awarded 77 acres of prime agriculture land, which was bequeathed by Rafiqui's parents to the Sarfraz Rafiqui Welfare Trust.

== Awards and decorations ==
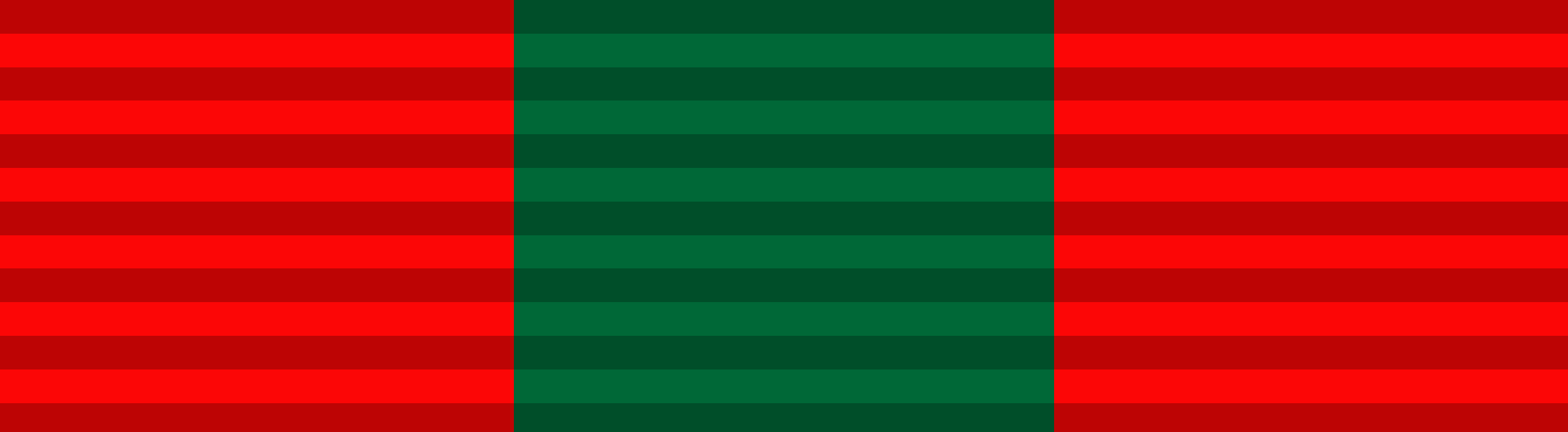

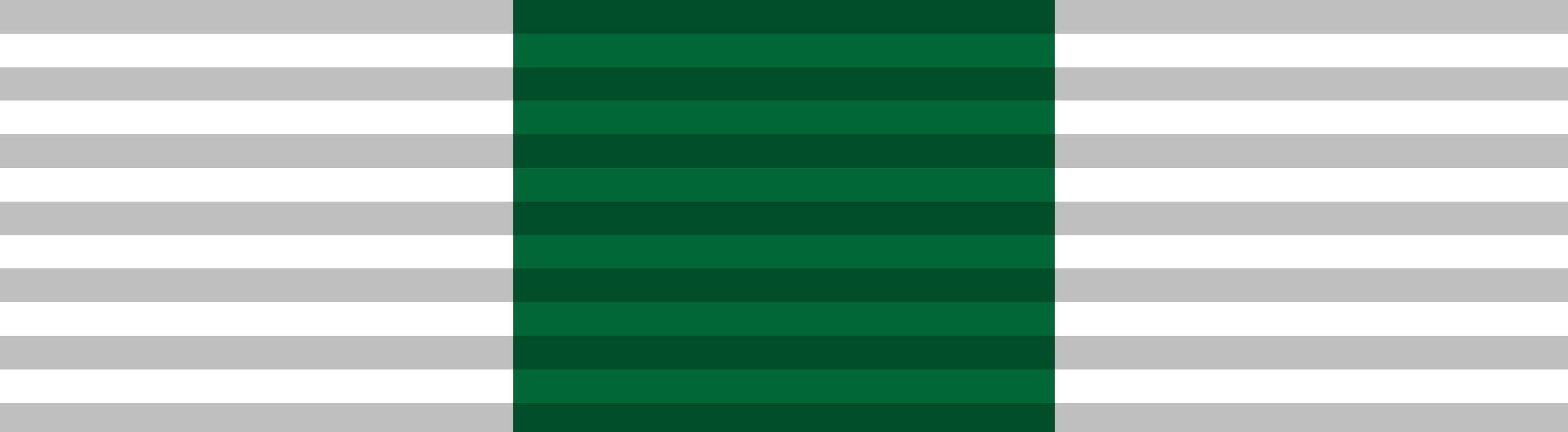

Hilal-e-Jurat (Crescent of Courage) 1965 War Posthumous		Sitara-e-Jurat (Star of Courage) 1965 War Posthumous	
Tamgha-e-Diffa (General Service Medal) 1965 War Clasp Posthumous	Sitara-e-Harb 1965 War (War Star 1965) Posthumous	Tamgha-e-Jang 1965 War (War Medal 1965) Posthumous	Tamgha-e-Jamhuria (Republic Commemoration Medal) 1956

== Hilal-i-Jur'at citation ==
For his bold leadership displayed over Halwara, Rafiqui was awarded Hilal-i-Jur'at, the second highest gallantry award of Pakistan.

His Hilal-i-Jur'at citation read as follows:

CITATION

Sqn Ldr Sarfaraz Ahmed Rafiqui

5 SQUADRON PAK/1429

On 6 September 1965, Squadron Leader Sarfaraz Ahmad Rafiqui led a formation of 3 F-86 aircraft on a strike against Halwara airfield. The formation was intercepted by about 10 Hunter aircraft out of which Squadron Leader Rafiqui accounted for one in the first few seconds. But then his guns jammed due to a defect and stopped firing. However, Rafiqui refused to leave the battle area which he would have been perfectly justified to do; instead he ordered his No. 2 to take over as leader and continue the engagement while he tried to give the formation as much protection as was possible with an unarmed aircraft. This called on the part of Squadron Leader Rafiqui. The end for him was never in doubt but he chose to disregard it and, in the process, his aircraft was shot down and he was killed but not before enabling his formation to shoot down 3 more Hunter aircraft. Rafiqui’s conduct was clearly beyond the call of duty and conformed to the highest traditions of leadership and bravery in battle against overwhelming odds. For this and his earlier exploits, he is awarded Hilal-i-Jurat and Sitara-i-Jurat.

== See also ==
- Imtiaz Bhatti
- Joseph C. McConnell
- Muhammad Mahmood Alam
- Saiful Azam
