= No. 27 Squadron PAF =

No. 27 Squadron Zarrars
- Logo of the squadron
- Active: 2007 - Present
- Country: Pakistan
- Allegiance: Pakistan Armed Forces
- Branch: Pakistan Air Force
- Role: Tactical Attack
- Part of: Central Air Command; No. 34 Tactical Attack Wing
- Airbase: PAF Base Rafiqui
- Nickname: Zarrars
- Mottos: دو نیم ان کی ٹھوکر سے صحرا و دریا (Persian for 'The desert and the river from their stumble')
- Aircraft: Dassault Mirage 5F ROSE-III
- Engagements: War on terror; Insurgency in KPK; Operation Rah-e-Nijat; Operation Khwakh Ba De Sham; Operation Burq

Insignia
- Patch

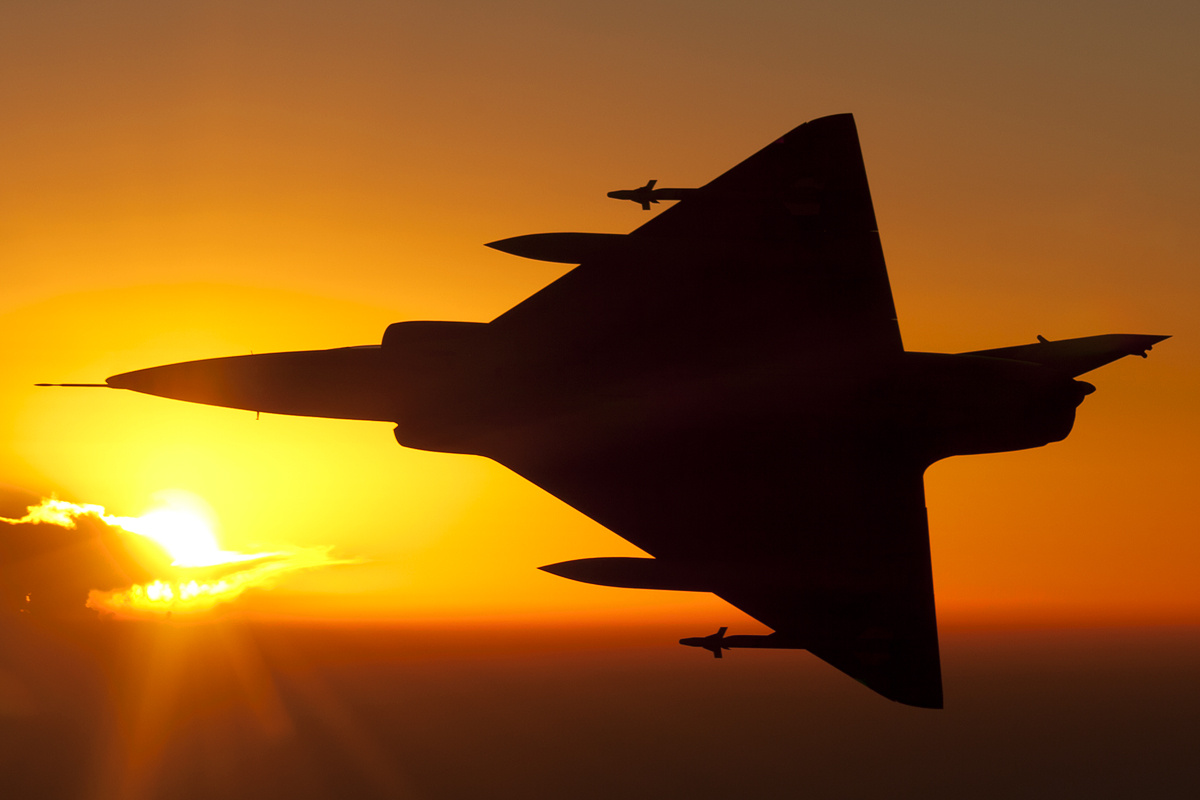
Mirage Aircraft of the squadron

The No. 27 Squadron, nicknamed Zarrars, is a tactical attack squadron from the No. 34 Wing of the Pakistan Air Force's Northern Air Command. It is currently deployed at Rafiqui Airbase and operates the Dassault Mirage-VEF ROSE-III aircraft.

== History ==
The squadron was formally raised on 19 April 2007 at PAF Base Rafiqui and equipped with the upgraded Dassault Mirage-5EF ROSE-III combat aircraft. The first Officer Commanding (OC) was Wing Commander Shafqat Mushtaq, the first Senior Engineering Officer (SEO) was Squadron Leader Najam-ul-Hasnain, and the first Engineering Officer (EO) was Flight Lieutenant Absar Omer.

=== Operational history ===
==== War on terror ====
After the spillover of militants & terrorists from Afghanistan into the Khyber Pakhtunkhwa province during the US invasion, The Zarrars were tasked to carry out air strikes throughout the former FATA & NWFP regions. In FATA, it took part in Operation Khwakh Ba De Sham and Operation Rah-e-Nijat supporting the army and local law enforcement.

As part of Operation Burq in 2009, the squadron carried out heavy air strikes on TTP positions in Swat valley in support of the army and local law enforcement's offensive.

== See also ==
- List of Pakistan Air Force squadrons
- No. 7 Squadron (Pakistan Air Force)
- No. 25 Squadron (Pakistan Air Force)
