= Dassault Mirage 5 =

French attack/interceptor aircraft

Mirage 5
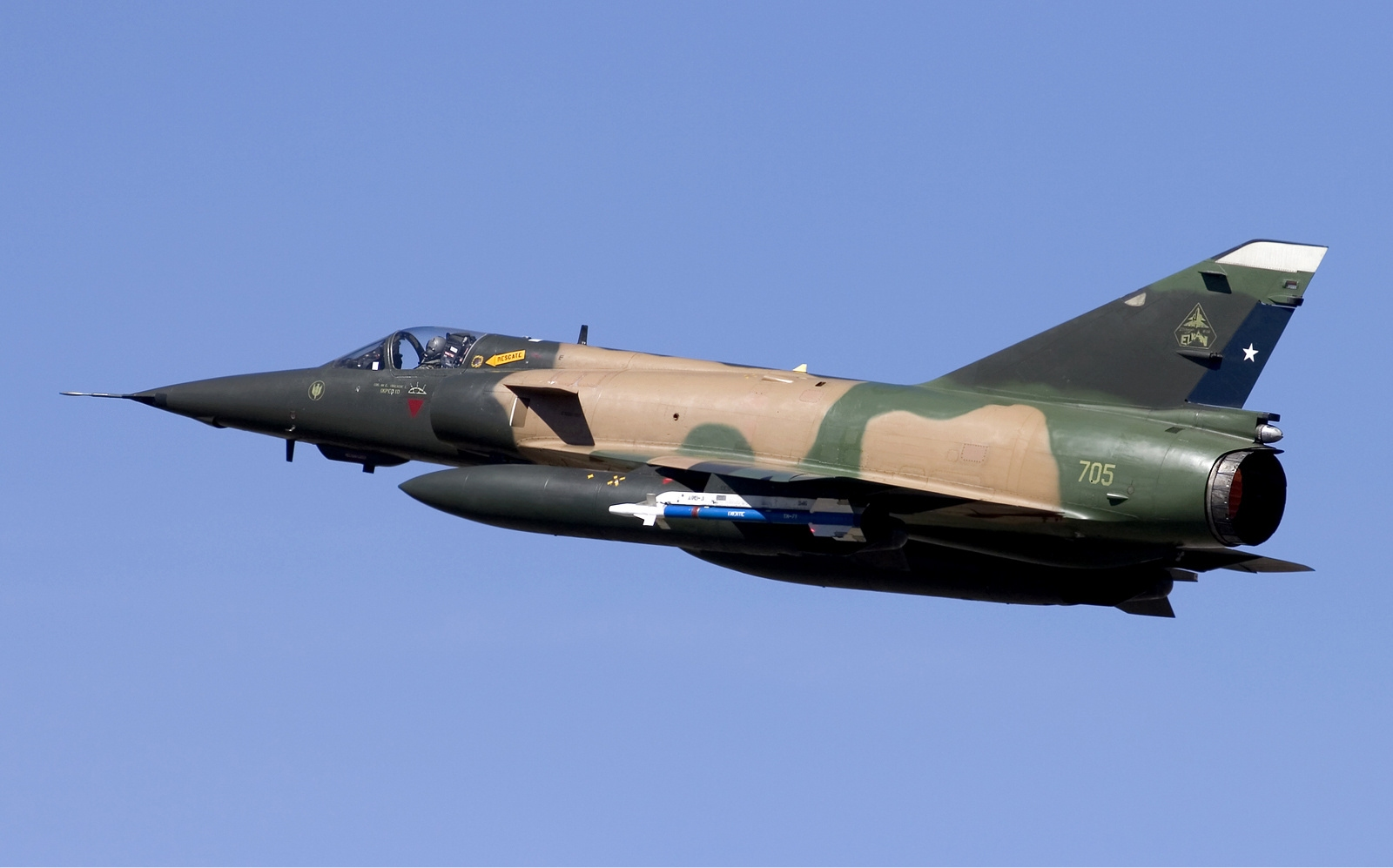
- Chilean Air Force Mirage 5MA

General information
- Type: Attack aircraft Fighter-bomber
- National origin: France
- Manufacturer: Dassault Aviation
- Status: Active
- Primary users: French Air Force (historical) Belgian Air Force (historical); Egyptian Air Force (historical); Pakistan Air Force
- Number built: 582

History
- First flight: 19 May 1967
- Developed from: Dassault Mirage III
- Variant: IAI Nesher
- Developed into: IAI Kfir.

The Dassault Mirage 5 is a French supersonic attack aircraft/fighter-bomber designed by Dassault Aviation during the 1960s and manufactured in France and other countries. It was derived from Dassault's popular Mirage III fighter and spawned several variants of its own, including the IAI Kfir. In the Pakistan Air Force, the Mirage 5 has been modified and is capable of nuclear weapons delivery.

== Design and development ==
=== Early development ===
The Mirage 5 grew out of a request to Dassault from the Israeli Air Force. Since the weather over the Middle East is clear and sunny most of the time, the Israelis suggested removing the air intercept radar and its avionics, normally located behind the cockpit, from the standard Mirage IIIE to reduce cost and maintenance, and replacing them with more fuel storage for attack missions. In September 1966, the Israelis placed an order for 50 of the new aircraft. Due to customer preference, some variants of the Mirage 5 were radar-equipped.

=== Mirage 5 ===
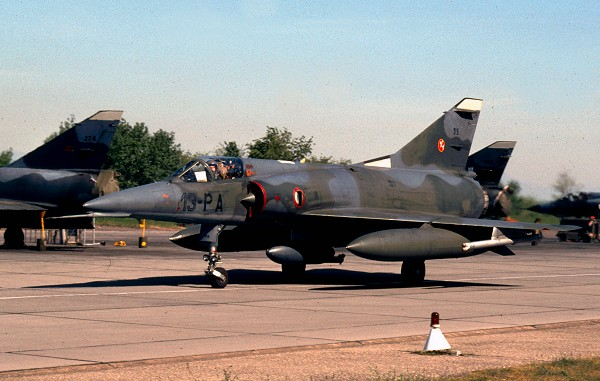
French Air Force Mirage 5F

The first Mirage 5 flew on 19 May 1967. It looked much like the Mirage III, except that it had a long, slender nose that extended the aircraft's length by about half a metre. A pitot tube was distinctively moved from the tip of the nose to below the nose in the majority of Mirage 5 variants. The Mirage 5 retained the IIIE's twin DEFA guns, but added two additional pylons, for a total of seven. Maximum warload was 4,000 kg (8,800 lb). Provision for the SEPR rocket engine was deleted.

Like the Mirage IIIE, the Mirage 5 was popular with export customers, with different export variants fitted with a wide range of different avionics. While the Mirage 5 had been originally oriented to the clear-weather attack role, with some avionic fits, it was refocused to the air-combat mission. As electronic systems became more compact and powerful, providing the Mirage 5 with increased capability became possible, though the rear avionics bay had been deleted; in some subvariants, the result was a "reinvented" Mirage IIIE.

Reconnaissance and two-seat versions of the Mirage 5 were sold, with the designation Mirage 5R, and Mirage 5D, respectively. The Mirage 5 was sold to Abu Dhabi, Belgium, Colombia, Egypt, Gabon, Libya, Pakistan, Peru, Venezuela, and Zaire, with the usual list of subvariant designations and variations in kit. The Belgian aircraft were fitted with mostly US avionics, and some Egyptian aircraft were fitted with the MS2 attack avionics system from the Dassault-Dornier Alpha Jet. In total, 582 Mirage 5s have been built, including 51 Israeli Neshers.

==== Belgian production ====
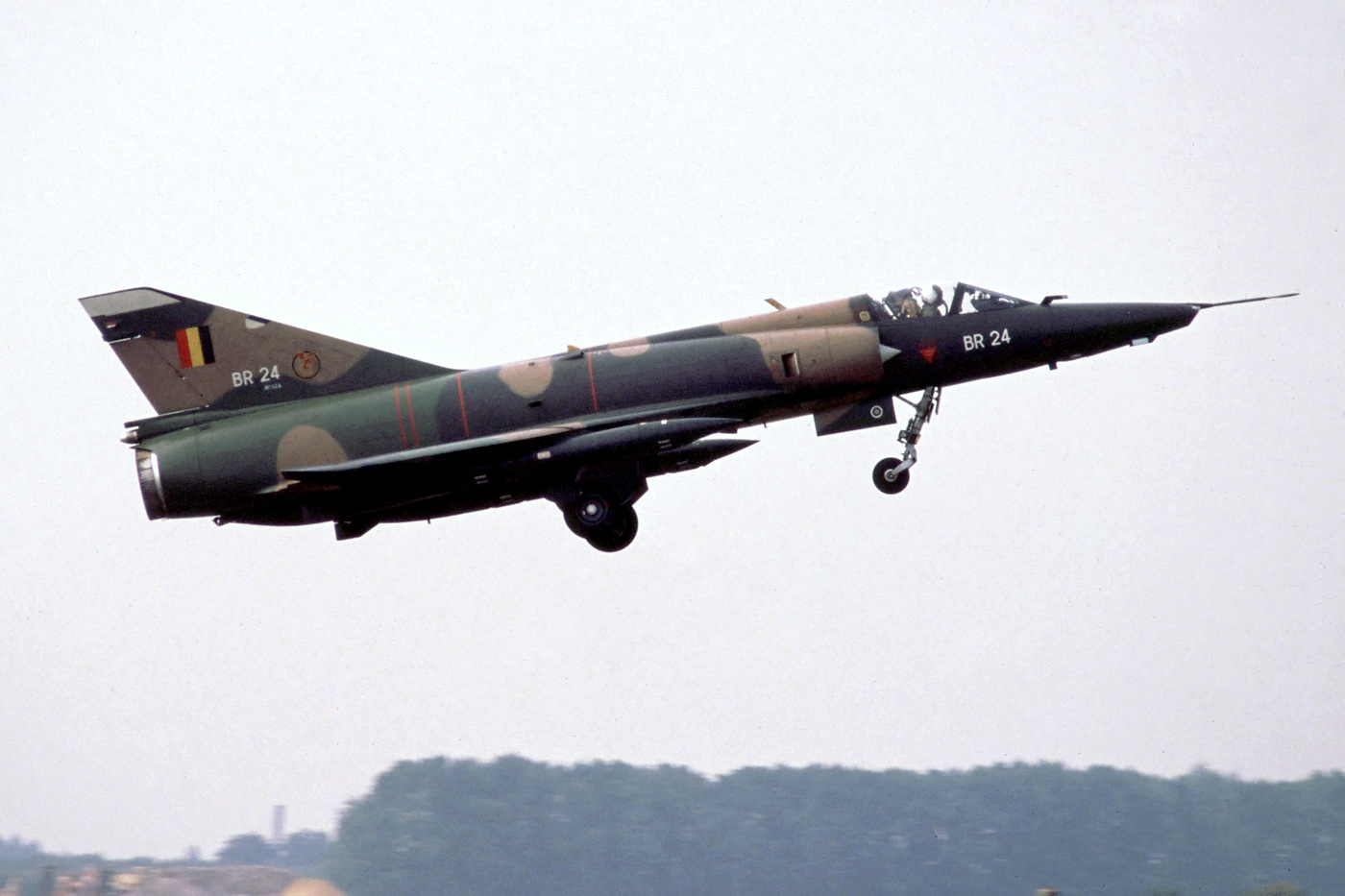
Mirage 5BR of the Belgian Air Component takes off in 1989

In 1968, the Belgian government ordered 106 Mirage 5s from Dassault. All aircraft but the first one of each variant were to be license-built by SABCA in Belgium. Component production at the SABCA Haren plant near Brussels was followed by assembly at the SABCA plant at Gosselies airfield, near Charleroi. The ATAR engines were produced by FN Moteurs at this company's Liège plant. SABCA production included three versions: Mirage 5BA for the ground-attack role, Mirage 5BR for the reconnaissance role and Mirage 5BD for training and conversion.

By the end of the 1980s, a MIRage Safety Improvement Program (MIRSIP) was agreed to by parliament, calling for 20 low-time Mirages (15 Mirage 5BAs and 5 Mirage 5BDs) to be upgraded. Initial plans included a new more powerful engine, but this idea was abandoned to limit cost. The upgrade eventually included a more modern cockpit, a new ejection seat, a laser rangefinder, and canards to improve takeoff performance and overall maneuverability. A new government canceled the MIRSIP but SABCA was allowed to carry out the update, in order to sell the aircraft on the export market. After completion, the Belgian government sold all 20 aircraft to Chile, together with 4 non-upgraded Mirage 5BRs, and one non-upgraded Mirage 5BD.

=== IAI Nesher ===
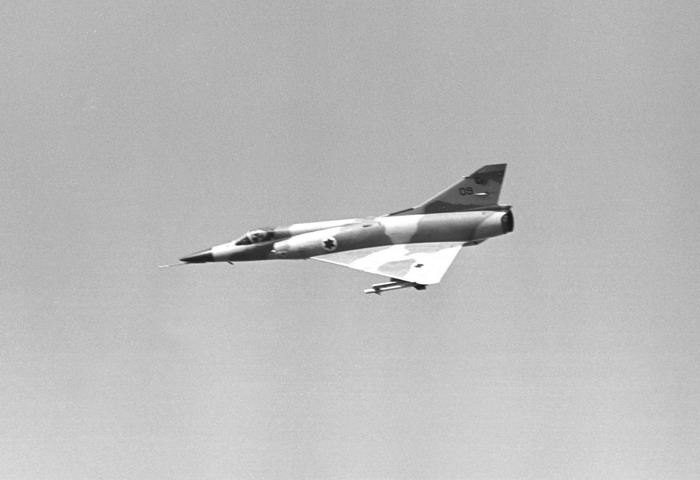
Israeli Nesher over the Golan Heights during the Yom Kippur War

Rising tensions in the Middle East led French President Charles de Gaulle to embargo the Israeli Mirage 5s on 3 June 1967. The Mirages continued to roll off the production line, though they were embargoed, and by 1968, the batch was complete and the Israelis had provided final payments. In late 1969, the Israelis, who had pilots in France testing the aircraft, requested that the aircraft be transferred to Corsica, in theory to allow them to continue flight training during the winter. The French government became suspicious when the Israelis also tried to obtain long-range fuel tanks and cancelled the move. The Israelis finally gave up trying to acquire the aircraft and accepted a refund.

Some sources claim that cooperation with France resumed outside the public's eye and Israel received 50 Mirage 5s in crates from the French Air Force, while the French took over the 50 aircraft originally intended for Israel, as Mirage 5Fs. Officially, Israel claimed to have built the aircraft after obtaining complete blueprints, naming them IAI Nesher and later developed it into the IAI Kfir.

=== Mirage 50 ===
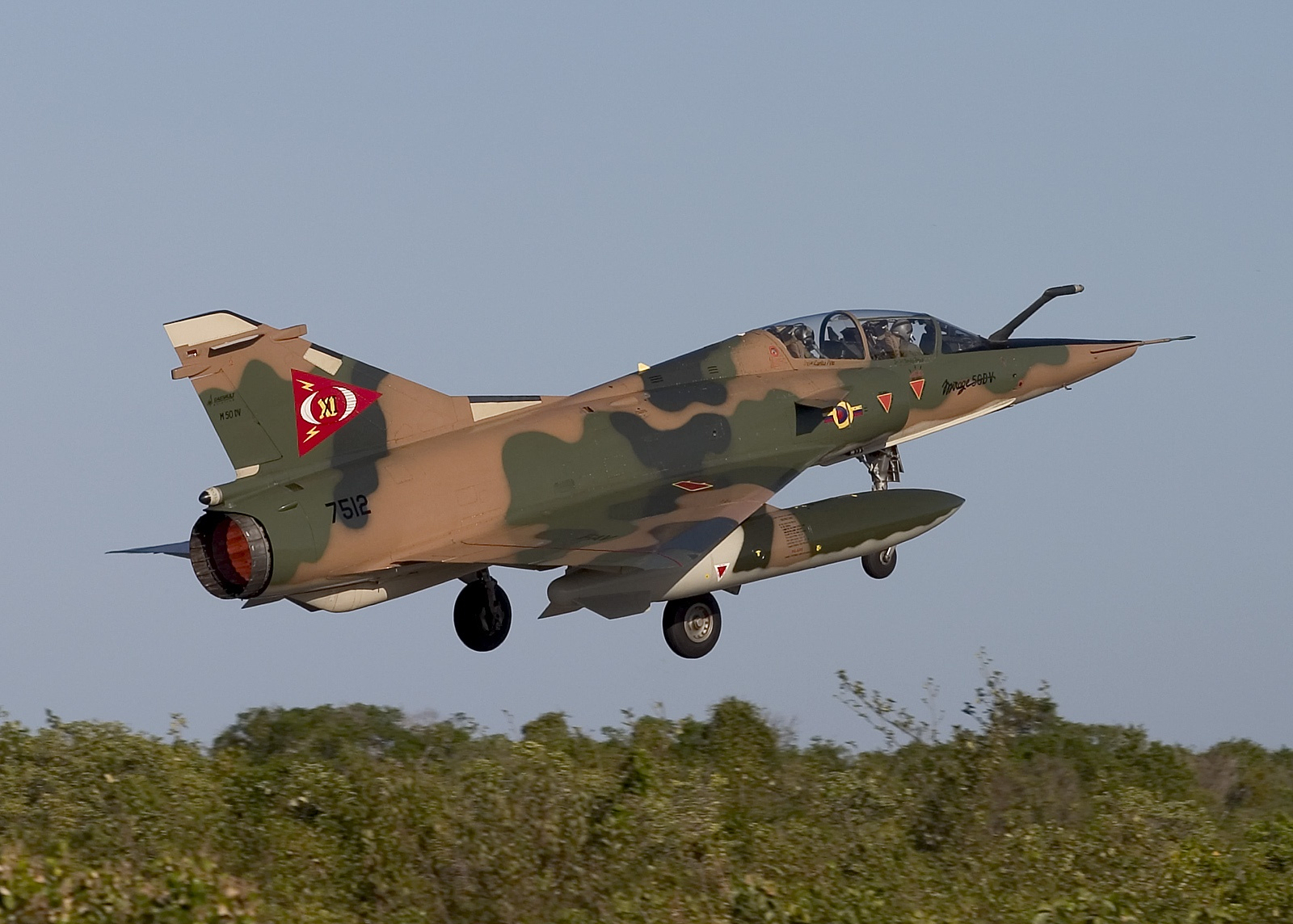
A Venezuelan Mirage 50DV

The development and subsequent installation of the new Atar 9K50 engine led to the next Mirage variant, the Mirage 50, during the 1970s. The uprated engine gave the Mirage 50 better takeoff and climb characteristics than its predecessors. The Mirage 50 also incorporated new avionics, such as a Cyrano IV radar system. However, despite these upgrades, it did not prove popular in export sales as the Mirage 5 itself was becoming obsolete.

Chile ordered a quantity of Mirage 50s, receiving both new production as well as updated Armée de l'Air Mirage 5s. The Chilean aircraft were later modernised along the lines of the IAI Kfir and were called the ENAER Pantera. The Pantera incorporates fixed canards and other aerodynamic improvements, as well as advanced avionics, an in-flight refuelling probe, a reinforced landing gear, and two additional harpoints under the fuselage. These aircraft have an extended nose to accommodate some of the new systems.

In the early 1990s, Dassault upgraded a batch of Venezuelan Mirage IIIEVs and 5s to Mirage 50 standards, in addition to some newly built aircraft.

=== Mirage 5 ROSE ===
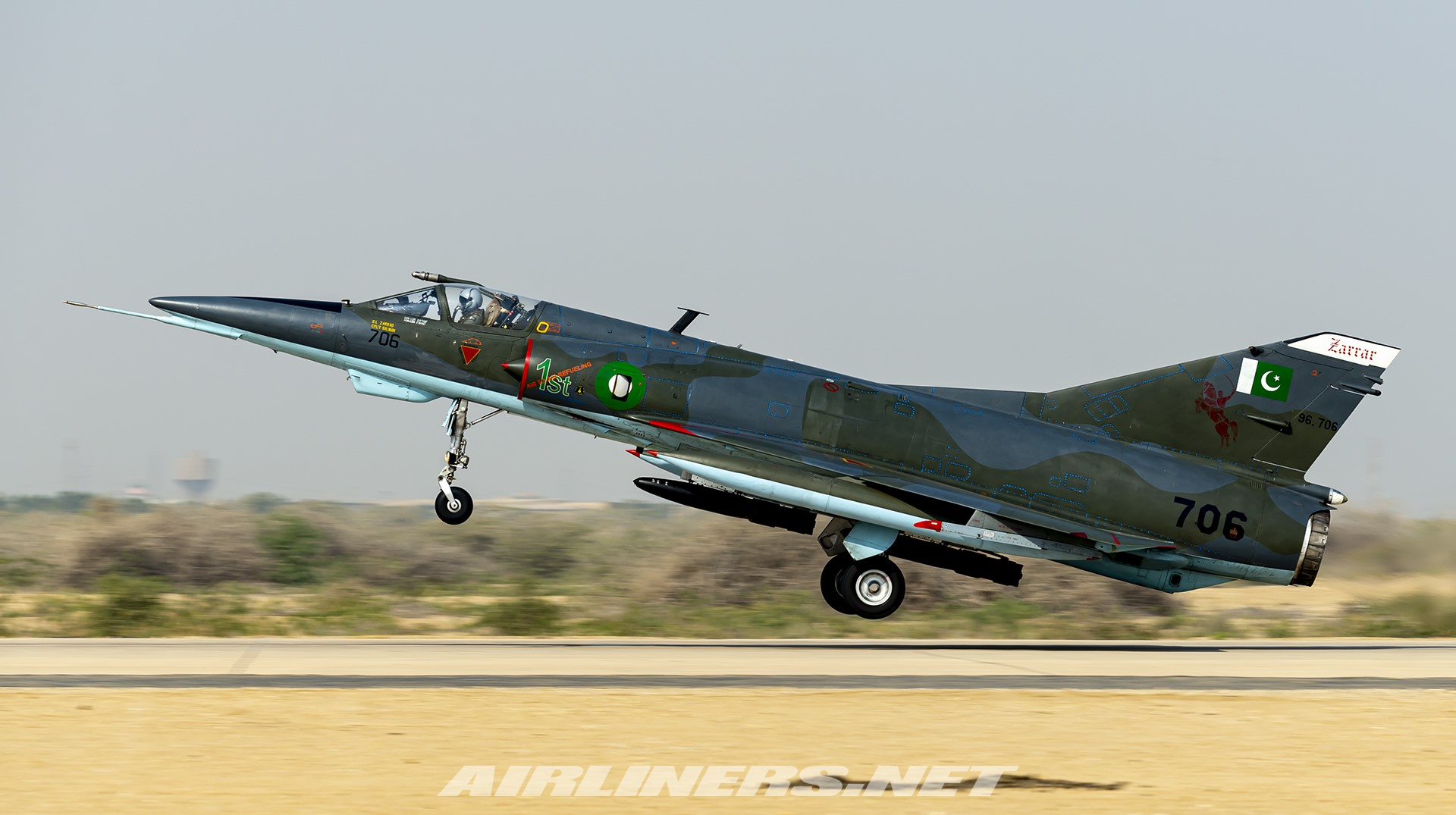
Pakistan Air Force Mirage 5 ROSE III taking off, carrying Mk 82 Snakeyes.

In the 1990s, the PAF launched a Mid-life update (MLU) program, codenamed as Project ROSE (Retrofit Of Strike Element), to its Mirage III and Mirage 5 aircraft with modern avionics provided by French, Italian, and Pakistani companies. The PAF acquired blueprint drawings of the aircraft from France, redeveloping and redesigning it at the Pakistan Aeronautical Complex.

In the first phase of the project, former Royal Australian Air Force Mirage III fighters received a modernisation designated ROSE I. Mirage 5Fs were also bought in the late 1990s from the French Air Force. Twenty of them were upgraded with new cockpit equipments including multifunction displays and a head-up display, navigation/attack suites, defensive aids systems, encrypted radios, a radar altimeter and a forward-looking infrared (FLIR) sensor under the aircraft's nose, under the ROSE II program.

Additionally, 14 Mirage 5Fs were similarly upgraded but with newer systems, under a program designated ROSE III. The FLIR sensors enable the Mirage 5 ROSE fighters to specialise in the night-time attack role.

== Operational history ==
=== Argentina ===
Between 1978 and 1980, Israel sold a total of 35 of their Neshers plus four Nesher trainer aircraft (Nesher Ts) to Argentina, where they were locally known first as Daggers and underwent several different upgrades over time referred to as Fingers. Mirage IIIs were also bought from Israel under a similar arrangement. All were retired in December 2015.

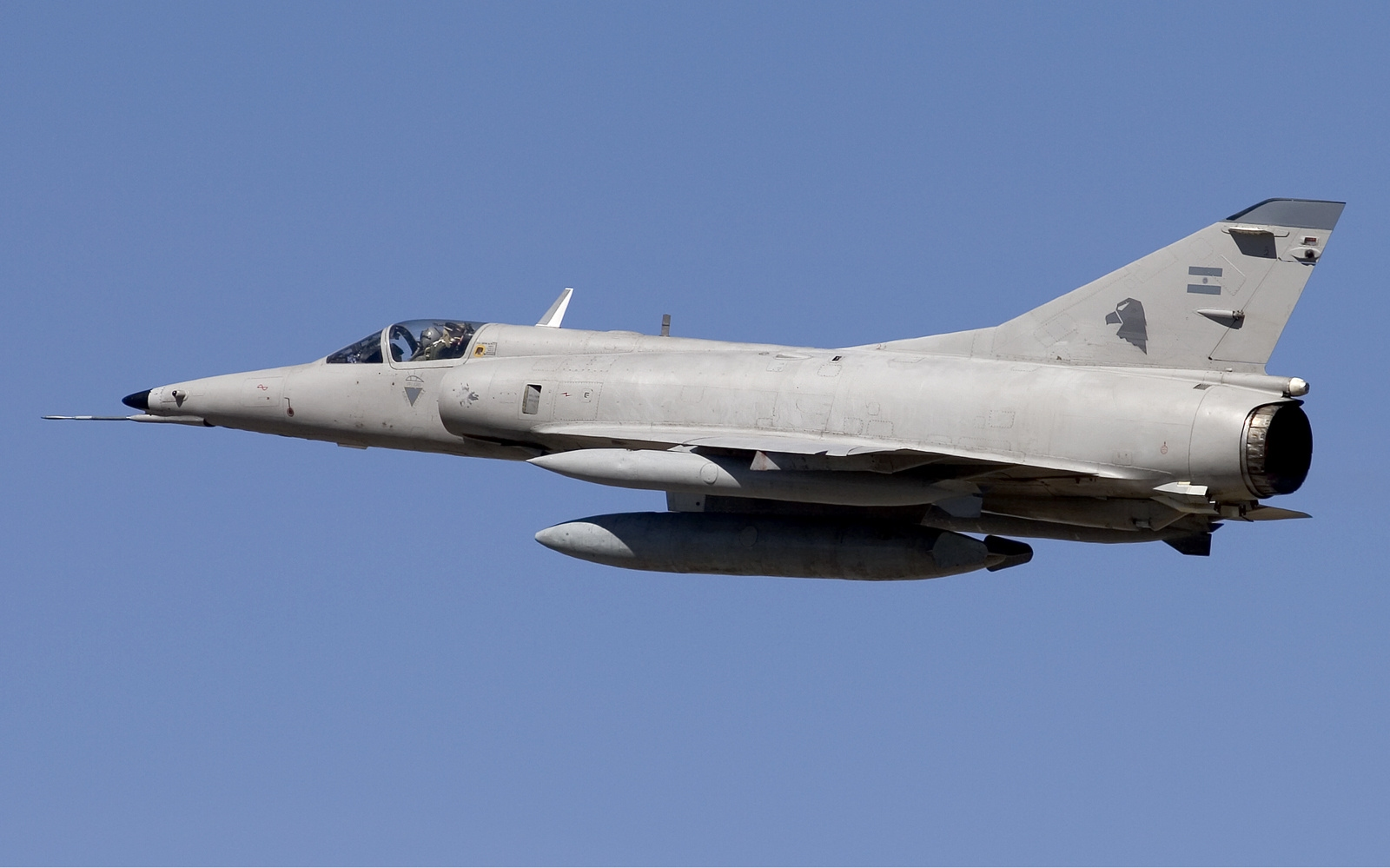
Argentine Air Force Mirage 5PA MARA, November 2005

==== Falklands War ====
The Argentines lost two Mirage IIIEAs and twelve Daggers during the Falklands War in 1982. The Peruvians transferred 10 of their Mirage 5Ps to Argentina, under the name Mirage Mara, to help alleviate these losses. The aircraft were upgraded after the conflict along the aforementioned Finger upgrades.

=== Belgium ===
==== Gulf War ====
During the 1991 Gulf War, 18 Belgian Mirage 5s were deployed to Turkey alongside German Alpha Jets and Italian F-104s under a NATO-based operation to protect Turkey against potential Iraqi attacks.

=== Chile ===
Chile incorporated some Mirage 5s under name Mirage Elkan.

=== Egypt ===
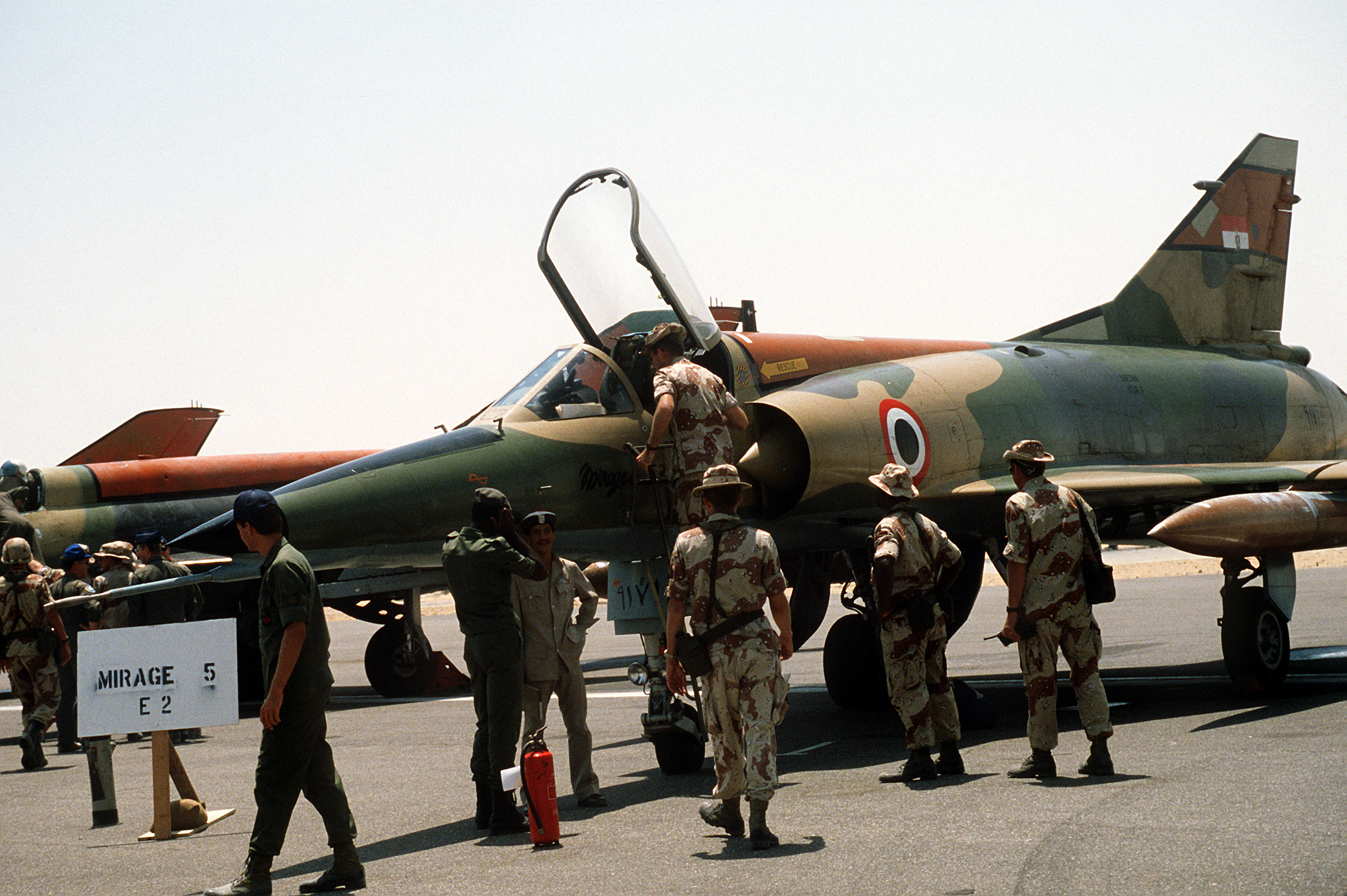
An Egyptian Mirage 5E2 in 1985

Egypt has historically used Mirage 5s, with a total of 101 aircraft being acquired. They were primarily used as ground strike aircraft and were extensively modernised throughout their time with the Egyptians, and at least one was shot down by Iranian F-14As on 14 March 1986, a Mirage 5SDE. Another Mirage was damaged by an F-4 Phantom on the same day. As of 2019, there was some talk to selling old airframes to Pakistan, though this seems to have not gone through.

=== Gabon ===
Gabon initially ordered three Mirage 5Gs, two Mirage 5RG Reconnaissance jets and two Mirage 5DG trainers for the Force Aerienne Gabonaise in 1975. The two reconnaissance variants were eventually cancelled and deliveries of the remainder were completed in 1978, with the Gabonese aircraft arriving in Libreville in 1980. In 1982, a follow on order for four Mirage 5G-IIs and two Mirage 5DG-IIs was placed with deliveries running until 1984, the contract also saw the eventual refurbishment of the older order Mirages. Two Mirages were lost in a mid-air collision a year after their initial delivery to the country over the capital of Libreville. These Mirages were the first fighters operated by the Gabonese Air Force, and they were flown regularly until at least the 1990s, when three Mirage 5Gs and three dual-seat trainers were still in service with the Escuadron de Chasse 1-02 "Leyou". They would be officially retired in 2006-2008 and Gabon would later acquire six ex-South African Mirage F.1s as replacements for the Mirage 5s.

=== Libya ===
The Libyan Air Force sought to improve its combat capability and looked to the weapon it viewed as the winning weapon of the Six-Day War, the Dassault Mirage series. France–Libya relations were positive at this time and thus they placed a rather large order for Mirage 5s in December 1969 composed of 53 Mirage 5D fighter-bombers (serials 401 to 453), 32 Mirage 5DE radar-equipped interceptors (Serials 101 to 132), 10 Mirage 5DR reconnaissance variants (Serials 301 to 310), 15 Mirage 5DD dual-seat trainers (201 to 215) alongside ground simulators and a large amount of spare parts. Libya was the second Arab nation (after Lebanon) and the largest Arab operator of the type. Libyan pilots were first sent to train in France in 1970 for platform-specific conversion training, but as Libya did not have enough pilots to man all acquired fighters, a portion of the crew trained were in fact Egyptians who were being trained to fight Israel with the first two batches being half Egyptian.

The first training squadrons established as OCUs (Operation Conversion Squadrons) were the 1010th "Jerusalem" OCU Squadron at Mitiga (Tripoli) supervised by French and Pakistani instructors, and the other was the Egyptian Operational Training Unit based at Nasser (Tobruk) Airbase overseen by Pakistani and Egyptian instructors recently trained in France. Egyptian Air Force MiG-21 pilots and MiG-21s also rotated to the airbase, serving as dissimilar combat aircraft for training to help them counter Israeli Mirages. Egyptian Pilots based at Nasser relocated to Tanta Airbase in April 1973, consisting of 20 pilots and 19 Mirage 5Ds and 2 5Rs formed the 69th Squadron, months before the Yom Kippur War. The remaining Egyptian pilots would leave after the conclusion of the war. Libyan officers travelled to Tanta Air Base and attempted to negotiate the return of the Libyan airframes during the Yom Kippur War, but the Egyptian Command refused, returning the airframes only in 1974 once newly built Egyptian Mirages from France were received.

==== Attack on the ITS Licio Visintini ====
Libyan-Italian relations deteriorated significantly in the early 1970s, and in 1973 the Libyan Air Force was involved in an attack on the Italian De Cristofaro-class Corvette ITS Licio Visintini (F-546) in the Sicilian Straits. Two Libyan Mirages initially spotted the vessel and conducted a strafing run with their onboard cannons, causing one injury on the Corvette. A subsequent flight of two Mirages also strafed the vessel resulting in the death of one and injury of another sailor on board.

==== Egyptian - Libyan War ====
Between 1974 and 1977, Libyan - Egyptian relations became increasingly strained. The Libyan Army during this time, conducted limited border incursions into western Egypt, provoking an Egyptian Army counterattack. A limited war - the Libyan - Egyptian War took place in July 1977, with Libyan Mirages performed close air support and interdiction missions in the first two days of the conflict.

In response to an Egyptian raid on Gamel Abdel-Nasser Airfield near Benghazi (where the destruction of seven airframes on the ground was claimed), a formation of Libyan Mirage 5s, supported by Mi-8s with ECM gear, was sent to attack Egyptian towns, bases and supply points near the border. During this raid, the Egyptians claimed the downing of one Mirage 5 by an SA-7. The next morning, an Egyptian attack was thwarted when two Mirage 5Ds of the Libyan Air Force intercepted a strike package and downed at least one Egyptian MiG-21 flying escort.

On the morning of Jul 23rd, 1977, a large Libyan strike package was assembled to strike targets deep within Egypt, possibly including Marsa Maturah Airfield, but this attack wave was hampered by Egyptian air defenses and aircraft. The war ended the next day, and the Egyptians claimed at least three to four Mirages destroyed in the air by MiG-21s with newly supplied and integrated AIM-9Ps (though some sources claim these were downed by anti-aircraft artillery instead). Some may have been lost on the ground.

Kills claimed by Libyan Mirage 5s:

- A Sukhoi Su-7 shot down on the 21st July, 1977 by a Mirage 5DE (Sometimes attributed to an SA-7)
- A MiG-21 downed on the 21st July, 1977 by a Mirage 5DE

=== Pakistan ===
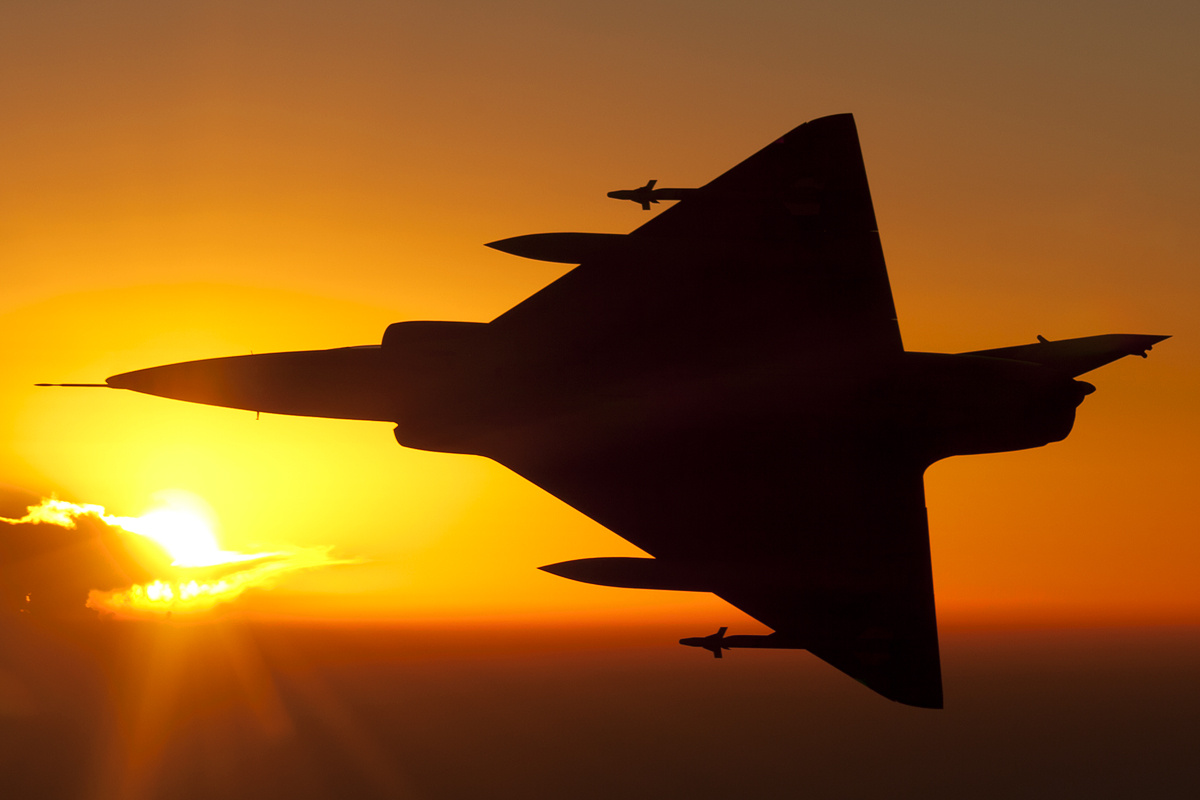
Silhouette if PAF Mirage 5 ROSE II

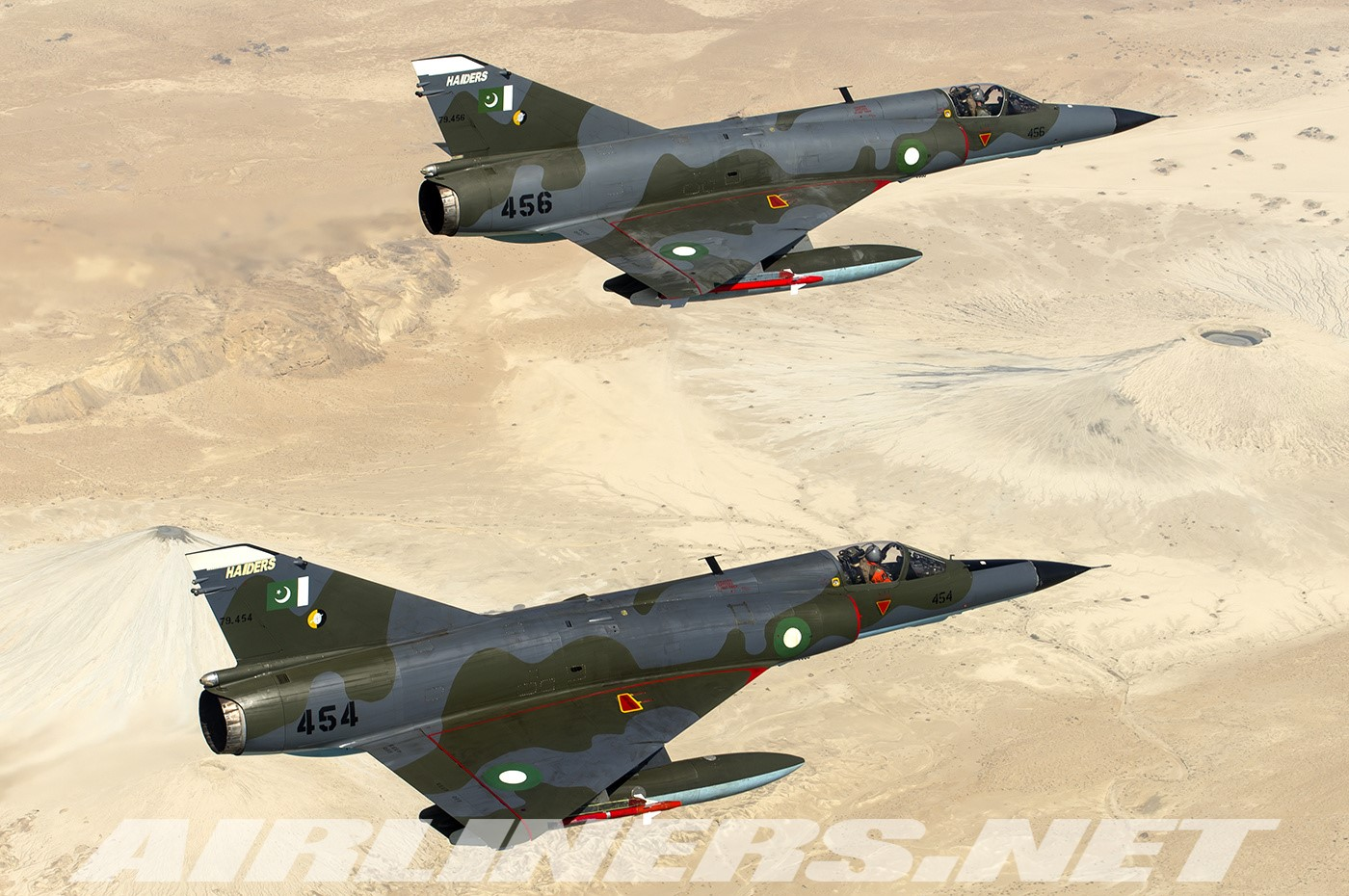
Two Pakistani Mirage 5PA2 inflight.

In 1970, Pakistan acquired its first Mirage 5s, specifically 28 Mirage VPAs (a longer-legged Mirage than the previous Mirage IIIs acquired under Blue Flash I) under the Blue Flash II program (alongside two Mirage IIIDP trainers). They came equipped with the AIDA II radar, and formed No.9 Squadron upon the commencing of delivery in January 1973 at Rafiqui. 10 of the 28 were sent to the Combat Commander's School, for its Mirage Squadron, with the remaining 18 at Rafiqiu also forming an Operational Conversion Unit within No.9 Squadron.

In 1978, Mirage 5s were delivered that were originally acquired under the direction of Pakistan Chief of Air Staff ACM (Gen.) Anwar Shamim from France to provide effective support to the Navy, specifically Mirages built to the VPA2 and VPA 3 standard whose fabrication began in 1979. These jets equipped the newly reformed No.18 Squadron at Rafiqui and later No. 8 Squadron at Masroor in 1982, with the VPA3s being equipped with the AM-39 Exocet missiles (which that same year were employed to great effect by the Argentine Air Forces in the Falklands War) and the Thomson CSF Agave radar to employ them effectively.

Pakistan has since acquired a number of airframes from nations that have phased the Mirage III and V out of service, including Lebanon and Libya. Mirages in Pakistani service have undergone significant upgrades over time, through a series of programs collectively referred to as Project ROSE. As of November 2025, about 90 Mirage VEFs,F,PAs in different ROSE Configurations are in active service with the PAF alongside 69 Mirage IIIs of various configurations.

==== Soviet-Afghan War ====
In 1985, the PAF elected to forward deploy Mirages to Kamra (Specifically the 18th Squadron) as, with the peak of Soviet involvement in Afghanistan, there was an increase in cross border incidents and the earlier deployed J-6s were deemed insufficient. On the 14th of May 1986, at 11:00 AM local time, two Mirage 5PAs (piloted by Sqd. Ldr Ro Qamar Sulemany and Flt. Lt. Nawaz) intercepted Mi-24s of the Soviet Air Forces when the GCI vectored them towards several slow flying targets closing at the border. After circling the targets, both made gun passes on the helicopters (Sulemany at 1.4 kilometers and 900 meters, Nawaz at 800–900 meters), but both missed. After returning to base, it was discovered that Nawaz had not removed the safety and Sulemany had a malfunction when the gun circuit breaker popped out because of short-cut in the gun pack. This deprived them of both kills.

==== Balakot Skirmishes ====
In February 2019, Indian Air Force jets violated Pakistani airspace and bombed an alleged terror camp in Balakot. Consequently, Pakistan launched retaliatory airstrikes (Codenamed "Operation Swift Retort") on military installations at Indian Administered Kashmir. During the airstrikes, two Dassault Mirage-5PAs from the No. 15 Squadron dropped their H-4 SOW glide bombs which were guided to their specific targets by Weapon System Officers seated in Dassault Mirage-IIIDAs via data link. The operation was viewed as a success as munitions were delivered and the aircraft returned safely.

==== Marqa-e-Haqq ====
The Pakistan Armed Forces' participation in the 2025 India-Pakistan Standoff (including the Pakistan Air Force's participation) was under the overall code-name "Marka-e-Haqq". Three weeks before the May conflict, a Pakistani Mirage 5 had crashed during a training mission, which was accidentally mistaken for an Indian Mirage 2000 or Rafale later on during the conflict. Due to their outdated airframes for air-to-air combat the Mirage 5 had limited involvement during the standoff and were given no frontline roles, which left the bulk of the work to the PAF's squadrons of J-10Cs and JF-17s. During the May 2025 conflict, Pakistan's Mirage IIIs and Mirage 5s did serve a frontline role. Despite this, on 12 May 2025, the Indian Air Force displayed debris of what it claimed to be a PAF Mirage 5 shot down by air defense systems during Operation Sindoor press briefing. The Quwa Defence News & Analysis Group, a publishing organization that covers Pakistan-centric regional defense coverage, stated that a Pakistani Mirage 5 may have been accidentally shot down in a friendly fire incident by an HQ-16 missile battery. In late June 2025, claims emerged from Indian OSINT sources showing alleged Video Evidence (uploaded to X, but then since deleted) of a downed Mirage. It was confirmed independently later on that Pakistan's Mirage 5s had no frontline role during the may clashes. The PAF denied suffering any losses, calling accusations baseless. Professor Cheng Xizhong of China’s Charhar Institute also said that there was no evidence of Pakistan losing any aircraft during the May conflict.

=== South Africa ===
South Africa purchased five Nesher trainers for trials during its own Atlas Cheetah fighter programme. All the aircraft were eventually upgraded to Cheetah D standard.

=== Zaire (DR Congo) ===
==== Chad ====
Following the Libyan invasion of Northern Chad, Zaire (a customer of French arms at the time), deployed three of its Mirage 5Ms alongside 1750 troops to N'Djamena, also participating in the training of local troops to fight Libya.

== Variants ==
- Mirage 5 : Single-seat radarless ground-attack fighter aircraft.
  - Mirage 5AD : Export version of Mirage 5 for Abu Dhabi, UAE; 12 built.
  - Mirage 5EAD : Single-seat radar-equipped fighter-bomber version for Abu Dhabi, UAE. 14 built.
  - Mirage 5BA : Single-seat version of the Mirage 5 for Belgium, fitted with mainly US avionics; 63 built, 62 under license by SABCA.
  - Mirage 5COA : Export version of the Mirage 5 for Colombia. 14 built. Remaining aircraft upgraded by IAI with canards and new avionics to 5COAM.
  - Mirage 5D : Export single-seat ground-attack aircraft of the Mirage 5 for Libya; 53 built.
  - Mirage 5DE : Single-seat radar-equipped fighter-bomber version for Libya; 32 built. 31 survivors upgraded with radar warning receivers starting in 1975.
  - Mirage 5F : Single-seat ground-attack fighter aircraft for the French Air Force. 50 ex-Israeli Mirage 5Js. Eight aircraft withdrawn for conversion to Mirage 50C for Chile, with eight new-build 5Fs built as replacements.
  - Mirage 5G : Export version of the Mirage 5 for Gabon. Three built.
  - Mirage 5G2 : Four aircraft for Gabon, with provision for a laser rangefinder under the nose; two new-build and two undelivered ex-Zaire 5M.
  - Mirage 5J : 50 aircraft were ordered by Israel, but the order was later embargoed by the French government. They were delivered instead to the French Air Force as the Mirage 5F.
  - Mirage 5M : Export version of the Mirage 5 for Zaire; 14 built, of which only 11 delivered owing to funding shortages.
  - Mirage 5MA Elkan : Upgraded Mirage 5BA aircraft sold to Chile.
  - Mirage 5P : Export version of the Mirage 5 for Peru; 22 built.
  - Mirage 5P Mara : Upgraded Mirage 5P for Argentina; 10 aircraft sold by Peru.
  - Mirage 5P3 : Upgraded aircraft for Peru, with new Litton inertial navigation system, radio altimeter, and new IFF; 10 built.
  - Mirage 5P4 : Upgraded aircraft for Peru, with all of the improvements found on the Mirage 5P3, as well as a head-up display, a laser rangefinder, HOTAS controls, in-flight refueling probe, and capable of using R.550 Magic missiles; two new-build plus upgraded older aircraft.
  - Mirage 5PA : Single-seat radarless version of the Mirage 5 for Pakistan; 28 built. Later modernized with a head-up display and a Litton inertial navigation system.
  - Mirage 5PA2 : New-build aircraft for Pakistan, fitted with the Agave radar; 18 built.
  - Mirage 5PA3 : New-build anti-shipping aircraft for Pakistan, also fitted with the Agave radar and compatible with the Exocet anti-ship missile. 12 built.
  - Mirage 5SDE : Single-seat radar-equipped fighter-bomber version for Egypt, equivalent to Mirage IIIE; 54 built.
  - Mirage 5E2 : Upgraded radarless attack version for Egypt, with a navigation and attack system identical to the one found on the Alpha Jet MS2. 16 built.
  - Mirage 5V : Single-seat ground attack aircraft 5 for Venezuela; six built. 2 survivors rebuilt to Mirage 50EV standard, and 1 to Mirage 50DV.
- Mirage 5R : Single-seat reconnaissance aircraft.
  - Mirage 5BR : Reconnaissance version of 5BA for Belgium; 27 built, 23 in Belgium.
  - Mirage 5COR : Export version of the Mirage 5R for Colombia; two built.
  - Mirage 5DR : Export version of the Mirage 5R for Libya; ten built.
  - Mirage 5RAD : Export version of the Mirage 5R for Abu Dhabi, UAE; three built.
  - Mirage 5SDR : Export version of the Mirage 5R for Egypt; six built.
- Mirage 5Dx : Two-seat training version.
  - Mirage 5BD : Two-seat trainer version of 5BA for Belgium; 16 built, 15 built locally.
  - Mirage 5COD : Two-seat trainer for Colombia. Two built. Upgraded with canards and new avionics.
  - Mirage 5DAD : Two-seat trainer for Abu Dhabi, UAE. Three built.
  - Mirage 5DD : Two-seat trainer for Libya; 15 built.
  - Mirage 5DG : Two-seat trainer for Gabon; two delivered in 1978.
  - Mirage 5DG2 : Two-seat trainer for Gabon; two built, delivered in 1984 and 1985 respectively.
  - Mirage 5DM : Two-seat trainer for Zaire; three built, all of which were delivered.
  - Mirage 5DP : Two-seat trainer for Peru; four delivered.
  - Mirage 5DP3 : Upgraded trainer for Peru, with the same improvements as on the Mirage 5P3; one built.
  - Mirage 5DP4 : Upgraded trainer for Peru, with the same improvements as on the Mirage 5P4, except the in-flight refueling probe; one new-build plus upgraded older aircraft.
  - Mirage 5DPA2 : Two-seat trainer version for Pakistan; two built.
  - Mirage 5DV : Two-seat trainer for Venezuela; three built. One survivor rebuilt to Mirage 50DV standard.
  - Mirage 5MD Elkan : Upgraded Mirage 5BD aircraft sold to Chile.
  - Mirage 5SDD : Two-seat trainer for Egypt; six built.
- Mirage 50 : multi-role fighter-bomber, ground-attack aircraft, powered by more powerful 49.2 kN (11,055 lbf) dry, 70.6 kN (15,870 lbf) with reheat Atar 9K-50 engine. Available with or without radar.
  - Mirage 50C : New-build radar-equipped Mirage 50 for Chile; six built.
  - Mirage 50FC : Eight re-engined Mirage 5F aircraft sold to Chile.
  - Mirage 50DC : Two-seat training version for Chile. Three built, two with lower powered Atar 9C-3 engine.
  - Mirage 50CN Pantera : Mirage 50C and 50FC aircraft upgraded by ENAER with help from the Israeli company IAI for Chile with canards, revised, Kfir style nose and new avionics; 13 50C and FC upgraded plus two 50DC trainers.
  - Mirage 50EV : Single-seat fighter-bomber version for Venezuela. Fitted with canards, and an in-flight refueling probe. New Cyrano IVM3 radar, SAGEM inertial navigation system, and head-up display. Equipped with a Sherloc radar warning receiver, and an ALE-40 chaff/flare dispenser. Capable of using the Exocet anti-ship missile. Six new-build, as well as seven upgraded aircraft (two Mirage IIIEV, two Mirage 5V, and three ex-Zairian Mirage 5M).
  - Mirage 50DV : Two-seat training version for Venezuela. Similar standard to 50EV, save for the radar, and the refueling probe that can only be used for training (no fuel transfer possible). One new build plus two upgrades (one Mirage 5V and one Mirage 5DV). This variant is also in service with the Ecuadorian Air Force.

== Operators ==
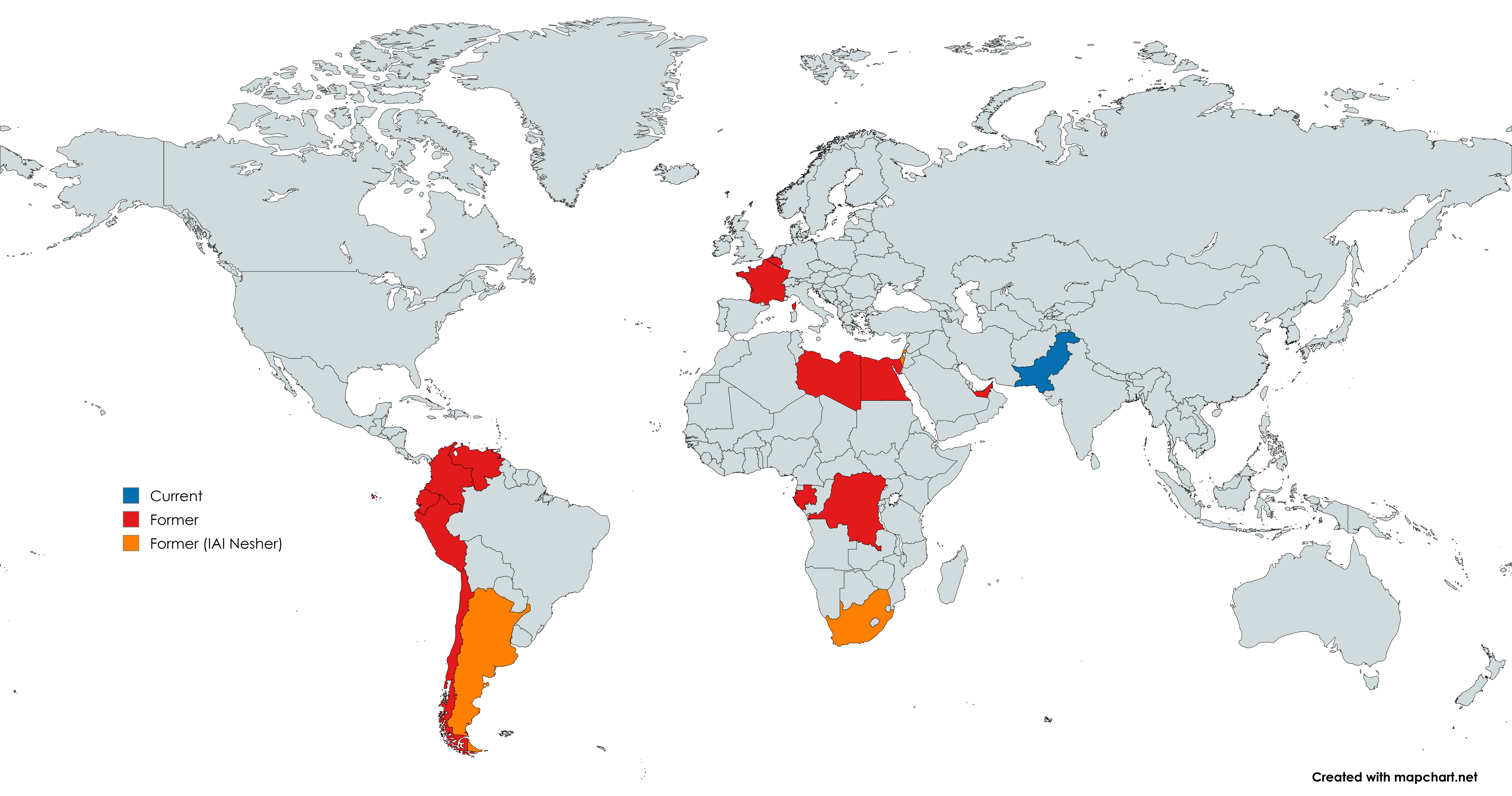
Current (blue) and former (red) operators of the Mirage 5. Former operators of the closely related IAI Nesher are denoted in (orange).

=== Current ===
- Pakistan: 37
    - Combat Commanders' School, PAF Base Mushaf, Mirage 5PA
    - No. 8 Squadron, PAF Base Masroor, Mirage 5PA2, 5PA3, 5DPA2 - (1979–2022)
    - 9 Squadron, PAF Base Rafiqui, Mirage 5PA - (1973–1984)
    - 15 Squadron, PAF Base Rafiqui, Mirage 5PA, 5DR (Converted to J-10C in 2022)
    - No.18 Squadron, PAF Base Masroor, Mirage 5PA2 - (1981–1989)
    - No. 22 Squadron, PAF Base Masroor, Mirage 5PA, 5PA2 - (1984–2004)
    - 25 Squadron, PAF Base Rafiqui, Mirage 5F ROSE II
    - 27 Squadron, PAF Base Rafiqui, Mirage 5F ROSE III

=== Former ===
- Abu Dhabi / United Arab Emirates: 32
- Argentina: 10 Mirage 5P and 39 IAI Nesher
- Belgium: 106
- Chile: 42, 25 Mirage 5M ELKAN and 17 Mirage 50
- Colombia: 18
- Ecuador: 6 Mirage 50, replaced by IAI Kfirs.
- Egypt: 101 Mirage 51, one of which was shot down on 14 March 1986 during Iran–Iraq War by AIM-9 Sidewinder launched by an Iranian Grumman F-14 Tomcat.
- France: 50
- Gabon: 11
- Israel: 61 IAI Nesher
- Federation of Arab Republics
- Libya: 110
- Peru: 40
- South Africa: 5 IAI Nesher; all upgraded to Atlas Cheetah
- Venezuela: 21, 9 Mirage 5 and 16 Mirage 50 (including 4 rebuilt Mirage 5 that were already used by Venezuela before)
- Zaire: 17

== Specifications (Mirage 5F) ==
Data from Encyclopedia of World Military Aircraft

General characteristics

- Crew: 1
- Length: 15.55 m (51 ft 0 in)
- Wingspan: 8.22 m (27 ft 0 in)
- Height: 4.5 m (14 ft 9 in)
- Wing area: 35 m^{2} (380 sq ft)
- Empty weight: 7,150 kg (15,763 lb)
- Max takeoff weight: 13,700 kg (30,203 lb)
- Powerplant: 1 × SNECMA Atar 9C afterburning turbojet, 41.97 kN (9,440 lbf) thrust dry, 60.8 kN (13,700 lbf) with afterburner

Performance

- Maximum speed: 2,350 km/h (1,460 mph, 1,270 kn) at 12,000 m (39,000 ft)
- Cruise speed: 956 km/h (594 mph, 516 kn)
- Combat range: 1,250 km (780 mi, 670 nmi) hi-lo-hi profile with 2x 400 kg (882 lb) bombs and max external fuel
- Ferry range: 4,000 km (2,500 mi, 2,200 nmi)
- Service ceiling: 18,000 m (59,000 ft)
- Wing loading: 391 kg/m^{2} (80 lb/sq ft)

Armament

- Guns: 2 × 30 mm (1.18 in) DEFA 552 cannons with 125 rounds per gun
- Rockets: 2 × Matra JL-100 drop tank/rocket pack, each with 18 × SNEB 68 mm rockets and 66 US gallons (250 liters) of fuel
- Missiles: 2 × AIM-9 Sidewinder OR Matra R550 Magic
- Bombs: 4,000 kg (8,800 lb) of payload on five external hardpoints, including a variety of bombs, reconnaissance pods or Drop tanks

== See also ==
Related development

- Dassault Mirage III
- Dassault Mirage 2000
- IAI Nesher
- IAI Kfir

Aircraft of comparable role, configuration, and era

- Chengdu J-7
- Mikoyan-Gurevich MiG-21
- Northrop F-5 Freedom Fighter
- Sukhoi Su-9
- Sukhoi Su-11

Related lists

- List of Dassault Mirage III operators
- List of fighter aircraft
- List of military aircraft of France
