= Project ROSE =

Pakistan Air Force program

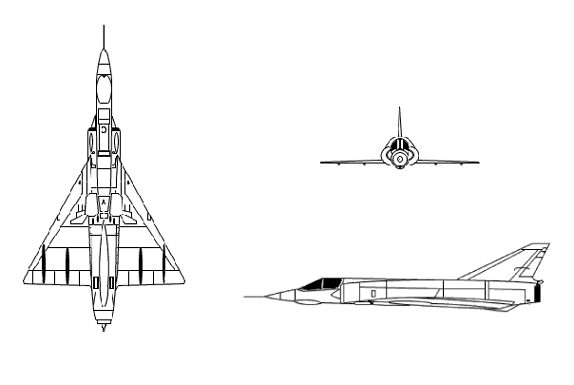
Three-view of the Mirage IIIE

Project ROSE ("Retrofit of Strike Element") was a program by the Pakistan Air Force to upgrade the avionics of its aging Dassault Mirage IIIEP and Mirage 5PA fighter jets. These aircraft were originally manufactured by Dassault Aviation in France, or by the Government Aircraft Factories (GAF) in Australia. The program, based at the Pakistan Aeronautical Complex, focused on upgrading the military avionics and onboard computer systems, with equipment supplied by Pakistani Margalla Electronics, French SAGEM and Italian SELEX consortia.

The program was initiated after the PAF began considering retiring or phasing out these aircraft from active service. The Pakistan Air Force, which was already operating Dassault Mirage IIIs and Mirage 5s, began its procurement of second-hand Mirage fighters from Australia, Lebanon, Libya, and Spain. More than 90% of aircraft were retrofitted at the Pakistan Aeronautical Complex in Kamra with the remaining being upgraded in France.

The upgrade package included the installation of a Grifo radar with a detection range of approximately 75 km, in-flight refueling probes, and airframe overhauls to extend service life. Further considerations for upgrades were recommended but the program was eventually terminated due to the increasing cost of spare parts and the poor condition of the second-hand airframes.

== History ==
=== Program overview ===
In the 1990s, the United States placed an economic and military embargo on Pakistan due to its Nuclear bomb program, which delayed the procurement of F-16 fighter jets. Also, the Indian Air Force began to modernize its fleet of fighter aircraft, thus putting stress on the Pakistan Air Force. The restrictions prompted the development of solutions to maintain combat readiness.

In 1992, the Pakistan Air Force devised a strategy to increase its self-reliance and launched the ROSE and Project Sabre II programs. Funding was provided in 1995 for both programs. Although the United States raised objections to the program, the PAF procured Mirage fighters from various countries including Australia, Belgium, Lebanon, Libya, and Spain from 1992 till 2003.

SAGEM from France and SELEX from Italy were contracted to provide consultations on military electronics and avionics in 1996. Overhaul facilities and engineering divisions were established at the Pakistan Aeronautical Complex (PAC) in Kamra. Over 90% of the aircraft were locally retrofitted at the Pakistan Aeronautical Complex, and a few aircraft were upgraded in France. Under this first phase of the program, designated as ROSE–I, around 33 Mirage III fighter jets, designated ROSE I, were upgraded to perform multiple mission types including air superiority and strike missions. The ROSE upgrade was also applied to 34 Mirage 5 fighter jets for conducting night operations.

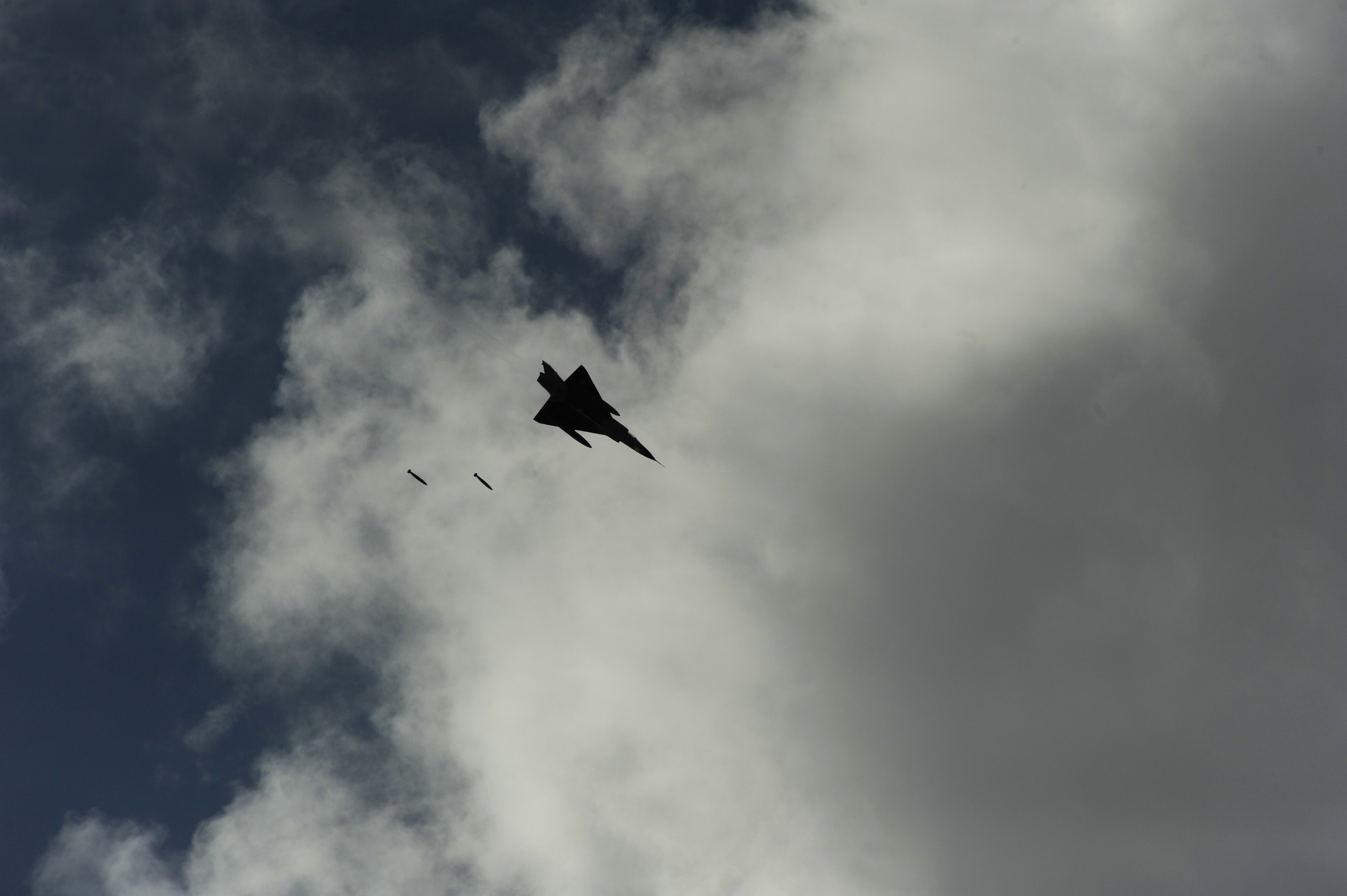
A Pakistan Air Force Mirage III fitted with the ROSE-III upgrade package drops bombs on a target during Falcon Air Meet 2010 at Muwaffaq Salti Air Base, Jordan

In 1998, Margalla Electronics, DESTO, GIDS and NIE joined the program after the departure of SAGEM and SELEX. In the second stage of the project named ROSE–II, around 20 Mirage fighter jets were upgraded and 14 aircraft were upgraded under ROSE–III. Newer Mirages bought from Australia and Belgium were in good condition with low flight hours to supplement the PAF's own fleet of 34 Mirage IIIs and 32 Mirage 5s acquired directly from France between 1967 and 1982. During 1998, the Pakistan Air Force bought the fleet of grounded Mirage IIIs from Lebanon and upgraded them at the Pakistan Aeronautical Complex.

A project team was formed to manage the program and held review meetings in both Pakistan and France. The Pakistan Aeronautical Complex and its technical personnel were involved with parts manufacturing and quality control. PAF test pilots validated performance of the new equipment during test flights. In 2003, the PAF bought a total of about 50 grounded Mirage 5 fighter jets from Libya along with 150 engines still in sealed packaging and a huge quantity of spare parts. Most of these aircraft were to be broken up for spare parts required by the Mirage fleet already in PAF service. With this purchase, the PAF became the largest operator of Dassault Mirage III/5 fighters.

=== Mirage IIIO ROSE I ===
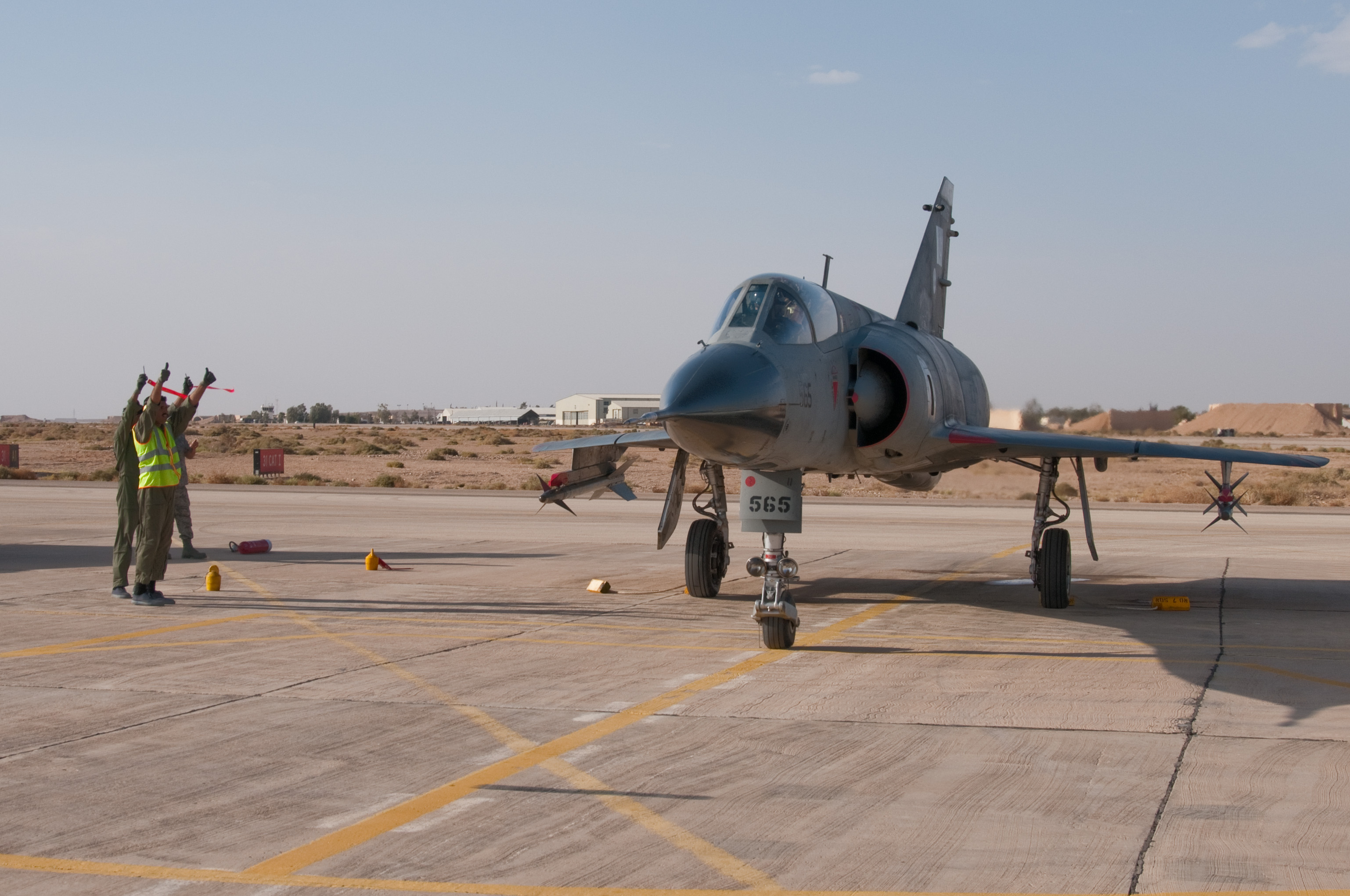
A Dassault Mirage IIIO, upgraded to ROSE I standard, takes part in an alert scramble competition during the Falcon Air Meet 2010 exercise in Jordan

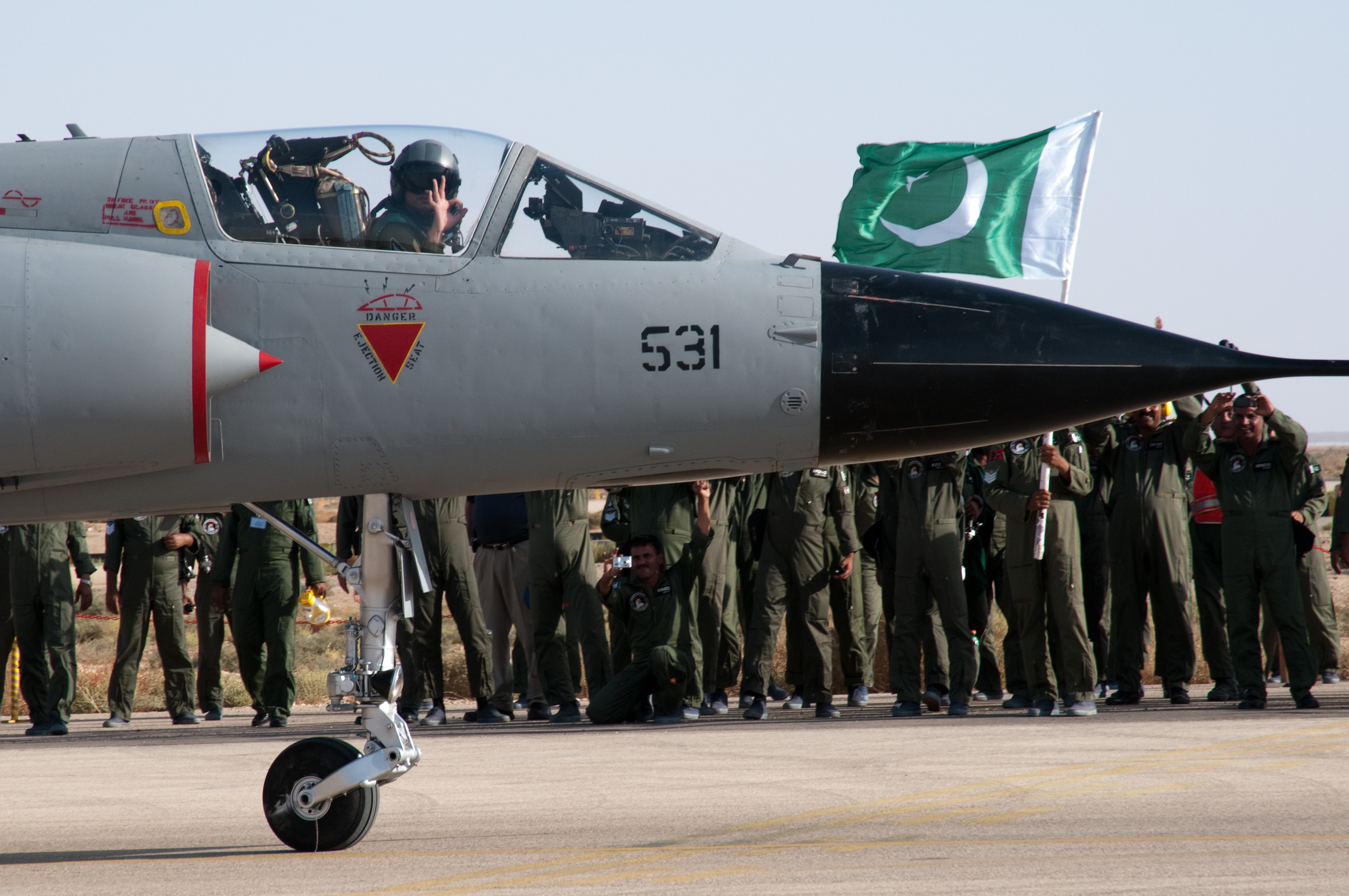
The FIAR Grifo M3 radar was installed in the black nose cone of this ROSE I aircraft

In 1990, the PAF bought 43 Mirage IIIOs and seven Mirage IIIDs, which had been retired from the Royal Australian Air Force between 1987 and 1989. Out of the 50 Dassault Mirage III fighters received from Australia, 40 were found to be suitable for service with the PAF, 12 of them were overhauled at PAC and made operational. After being inspected, the remaining 28 were selected for upgrade under Project ROSE. 28 of the ex-Australian Dassault Mirage IIIO/D aircraft of the PAF were modified to ROSE I standard. The cockpit was modernized with a new head-up display, new multi-function displays, and a new radar altimeter. New navigation systems, including an inertial navigation system and a GPS, were also installed. A new radar warning receiver was installed.

The FIAR Grifo M3 multi-mode radar was installed in the second phase of the upgrade project. It was stated that ROSE I fighters could easily be in service beyond 2010. In early 1999 it was stated that problems in "certain parameters - and errors in certain modes" had surfaced during flight trials of the Grifo M3 radar in the Mirage III, but these were later solved.

A new Italian fire-control radar, the FIAR (now SELEX Galileo) Grifo M3, was installed. The PAF's standard short-range air-to-air missile at the time, the AIM-9L Sidewinder, was integrated with the Grifo M3 radar.

The Grifo M3 was developed specifically to fit the Mirage III and has been in full operation on the Mirage III since 2001. It has a power consumption of 200 W, operates in the X-band and is compatible with infrared-guided, semi-active and active radar guided missiles. The circular antenna has a diameter of 47 cm. The radar has over 30 different operational air-to-air/air-to-surface mission and navigation modes. Air to air modes include Single/Dual Target Track and Track While Scan. Air to surface modes include Real Beam Map, Doppler Beam Sharpening, Sea Low/High, Ground Moving Target Indicator, Ground/Sea Moving Target Track.

Other optional modes include Raid Assessment, Non Cooperative Target Identification, SAR (synthetic aperture radar) and Precision Velocity Update. Low, medium and high pulse repetition frequencies reduce effects of ground clutter. Digital adaptive pulse-compression technology, dual channel receiver, scanning coverage +/-60 degrees in both azimuth and elevation, air cooling, weighs less than 91 kg, MTBF (flight guaranteed) over 220 hours. Extensive ECCM (electronic counter-countermeasures) provisions and built-in test equipment (BITE). IFF interrogators can also be integrated.

The in-flight refueling probes of South African origin were also installed on the upgraded Mirage III ROSE I aircraft, stating that it is a pilot program for the induction of aerial refueling capability into the PAF.

=== Mirage 5F ROSE II ===
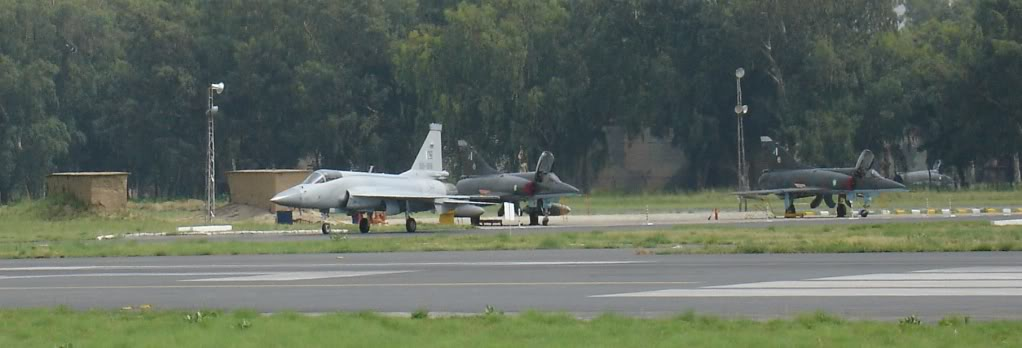
Mirage 5s with a CAC/PAC JF-17 Thunder at a PAF base, circa 2006

In 1996, SAGEM sold 44 surplus French Air Force Mirages (35 single-seat Mirage 5Fs and nine dual-seat Mirage IIIBEs) to the PAF. Only 34 Mirage 5Fs and six Mirage IIIBEs were intended to fly again, the others serving as spare parts sources. 20 Mirage 5Fs were overhauled and upgraded in France to ROSE II standards. In total, 29 Mirage 5Fs and six Mirage IIIBEs (respectively designated Mirage 5EF and Mirage IIIDF with the PAF) were delivered to Pakistan by air between 1999 and 2001, with five other aircraft delivered by boat to be overhauled by PAC (one single-seater crashed during an acceptance flight in France).

ROSE II Mirages are similar to ROSE I examples, but they are fitted with a navigation FLIR in place of the Grifo M3 radar. It is mounted in a pod under the nose. Moreover, a new inertial navigation system was installed, together with an encrypted radio.

=== ROSE III ===
14 ex-French Air Force aircraft that hadn't been upgraded to ROSE II standards were upgraded to ROSE III standards in Pakistan. In addition to the upgrades embodied in the ROSE II standard, the ROSE III modernization includes a new head-up display, a new multi-function display, and a Chinese-made radar warning receiver. A new PAF squadron was raised on 19 April 2007, No. 27 Tactical Attack "Zarrar" Squadron, to operate the Mirage 5 ROSE III fighters and specialize in night-time surface strike missions.

=== ROSE IV ===
A ROSE IV upgrade was also offered, but not taken up. It was based on the ROSE III upgrade standard, but it also included the installation of the Grifo 3 radar, AIM-9L/M capacity, as well as the Dart targeting pod, derived from the Litening. A chaff/flare dispenser and a radar warning receiver were also planned to be added.

== Conclusion of the program ==
The ROSE program saved the Pakistan Air Force financial capital that could be spent on the foreign exchange. Under this program, further upgrades were considered and recommendations were made for the procurement of Mirage 2000 from Qatar.

Acquisitions of Mirage 2000s from Qatar were bypassed by the JS HQ when Indian IAF inducted the jets in its fleet. In 2003, the PAF bought 13 more Mirage IIIEs from Spain for spare parts, and they were actually used for that purpose, unlike the Australian and Lebanese purchases. Their condition dictated their return to service was highly unlikely. Problems were encountered for the upgrade of the Mirage 5's role in naval variant for the Navy, which was eventually solved with the procurement of spare parts.

The program contributed to maintaining the operational relevance of Mirage aircraft in Pakistan’s air defense strategy. The program was meant to be continued for some time after 2003, but the Pakistan Air Force had to terminate it due to a combination of high costs and aging Mirage III/5 airframes.
