= Aurangzeb Ahmed =

Pakistan's Air Vice Marshal

Aurangzeb Ahmed SI(M) SBt TI(M)
- اورنگزیب احمد

Director General Public Relations Pakistan Air Force
- In office 25 August 2022 – March 2026
- Chief of Air Staff: Zaheer Ahmad Babar
- Preceded by: AVM Tariq Zia

Commander Air Force Strategic Command (Pakistan)
- Incumbent
- Assumed office 5 March 2026

Personal details
- Born: 1970 (age 55–56)
- Education: Pakistan Air Force Academy; National Defence University (Pakistan)

Military service
- Allegiance: Pakistan
- Branch/service: Pakistan Air Force
- Years of service: 1992 — present
- Rank: Air Vice Marshal
- Unit: No. 9 Squadron PAF
- Commands: Director General Warfare and Strategy; Assistant Chief of the Air Staff (Operational Requirements & Development); Directing Staff at National Defence University; Deputy Chief of the Air Staff (Operations); Commander Air Force Strategic Command (Pakistan)
- Awards: Sitara-e-Imtiaz (Military); Tamgha-e-Imtiaz (Military); Sitara-e-Basalat

Air Vice Marshal Aurangzeb Ahmed, SI(M) SBt TI(M) is a two-star rank officer who is the incumbent Deputy Chief of Air Staff (Operations) and commander of the Air Force Strategic Command (Pakistan).

== Education ==
Aurangzeb holds a master's degree in Military Arts from China. He is also fluent in Mandarin. He has done a master's on National Security & War Studies from the National Defence University as well.

== Military career ==
Aurangzeb was commissioned in the General Duty (GD) pilot branch of the Pakistan Air Force in 1992.

Aurangzeb has commanded a Fighter Squadron and an Operational Air Base of the PAF. He served in Saudi Arabia as a Contingent Commander of Pakistan Aeronautical Complex Team. He also served as ACAS (OR&D) at Air Headquarters. Upon his promotion to Air vice-marshal, he assumed the office of DGPR PAF. Aurangzeb had also served as Director General, Warfare and Strategy.

As of 2025, he was serving as Deputy Chief of the Air Staff (Operations). In 2026, Aurangzeb was appointed as the commander of the Air Force Strategic Command (Pakistan).

=== 2025 India–Pakistan conflict ===
Aurangzeb came into the limelight in the press conference of Inter-Services Public Relations, led by Lieutenant General Ahmed Sharif Chaudhry.

Aurangzeb claimed the losses of several India Air Force jets during the dogfight. He gave several proof of the downed Indian jets, including voice recording of one of the Indian Rafale, images and videos. He upheld the deployments of Pakistan Air Force against India during this conflict. Aurangzeb claimed the PAF had made a "swift and steady" reply against India's aggression.

Aurangzeb was praised by Netizens of Pakistan for his role in the conflict and "charismatic character".

He became Pakistan's top Google search after his press briefings on military tensions with India gained widespread public attention and praise.

== Awards and decorations ==
Aurangzeb has been decorated with various military awards, which includes Sitara-e-Imtiaz in 2021 and Tamgha-e-Imtiaz. He was awarded the Sitara-e-Basalat following his contributions in the 2025 India–Pakistan conflict.

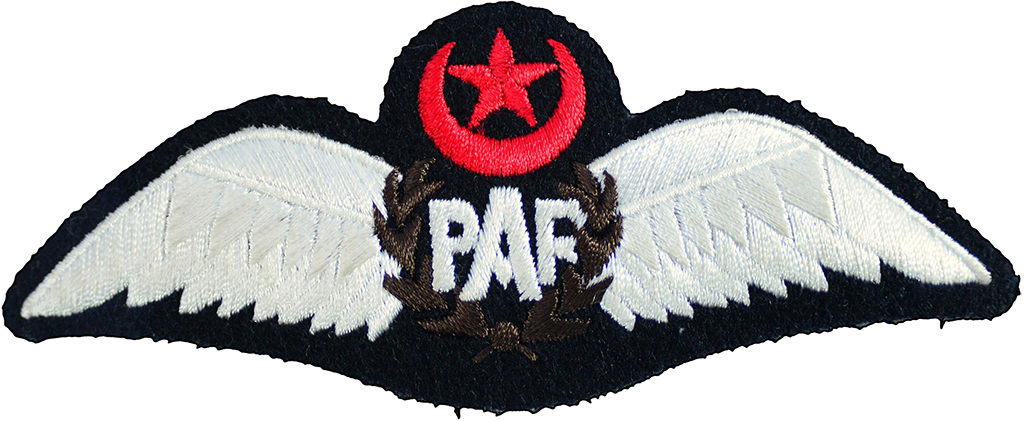

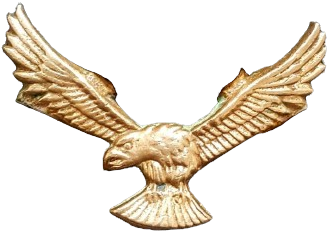

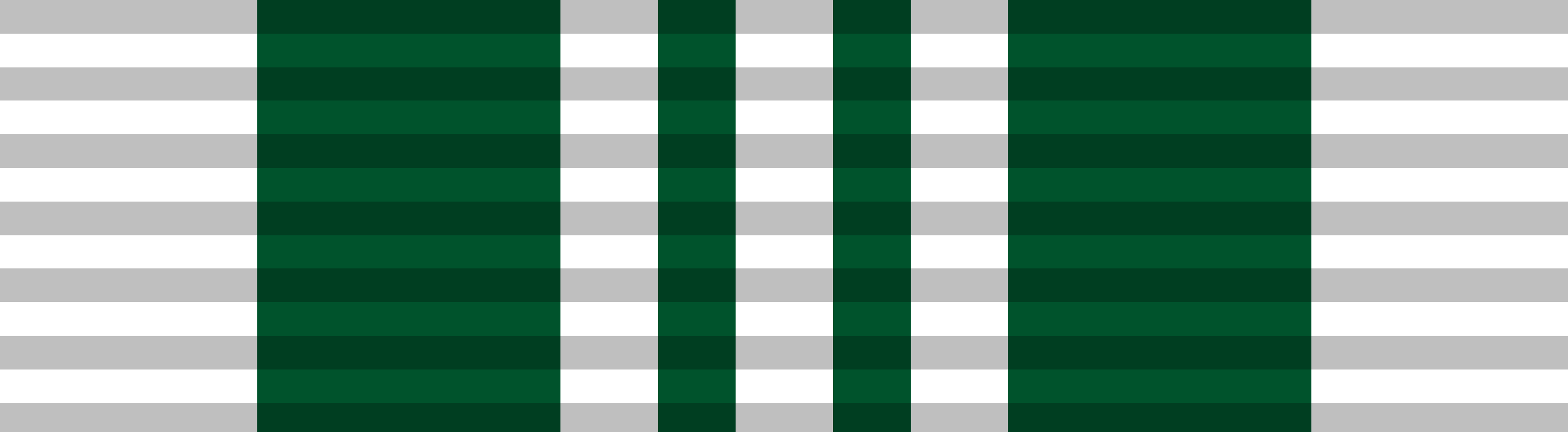

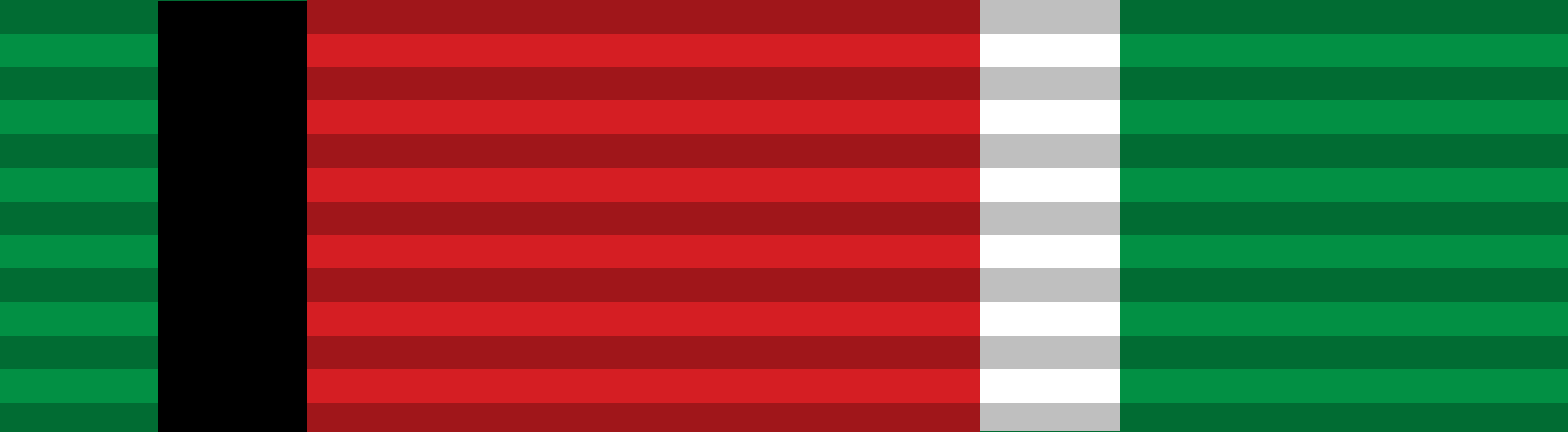

PAF GD(P) Badge RED (More than 3000 Flying Hours)
Golden Eagle Award (Pakistan) (Exceptional Fighter Pilot)
	Sitara-e-Imtiaz (Military) (Star of Excellence)	Sitara-e-Basalat (Military) (Star of Good Conduct)	
Tamgha-e-Imtiaz (Military) (Medal of Excellence)	Tamgha-e-Baqa (Nuclear Test Medal)	Tamgha-e-Istaqlal Pakistan (Escalation with India Medal)	Tamgha-e-Azm (Medal of Conviction)
10 Years Service Medal	20 Years Service Medal	30 Years Service Medal	35 Years Service Medal
Jamhuriat Tamgha (Democracy Medal)	Qarardad-e-Pakistan Tamgha (Resolution Day)	Tamgha-e-Salgirah Pakistan (Independence Day Golden Jubilee Medal)	Pakistan Medal (Pakistan Tamgha)

== See also ==
- Indo-Pakistani wars and conflicts
- 2025 India–Pakistan conflict
- 2025 India–Pakistan standoff
