= Awards and decorations of the Pakistan Armed Forces =

The awards and decorations of the Pakistan Armed Forces recognize a service member's service and personal accomplishments while being a member of the Pakistan Armed Forces. These awards are awarded only to those who show absolute bravery, dedication, loyalty and commitment towards the service and nation- Pakistan.

Flag of the Pakistan Armed Forces

== Decorations ==
=== Wartime gallantry medals ===
Nishan-e-Haider (Order of the Lion)
Hilal-e-Jurat (Crescent of Courage)
Sitara-e-Jurat (Star of Courage)
Tamgha-e-Jurat (Medal of Courage)
Imtiazi Sanad (Mentioned in Despatches)

=== Peacetime distinguished service medals ===
Nishan-e-Imtiaz (Military) (Order of Excellence) Awarded to four-star Generals and equivalent when considered appropriate by the Government of Pakistan
Hilal-e-Imtiaz (Military) (Crescent of Excellence) Awarded to major generals & above or equivalent, for excellence of work/spontaneous meritorious acts
Sitara-e-Imtiaz (Military) (Star of Excellence) Awarded to colonel & above, for excellence of work/spontaneous meritorious service or on completion of 18 years of service
Tamgha-e-Imtiaz (Military) (Medal of Excellence) Awarded to lieutenant colonel & above, for excellence of work/spontaneous meritorious service or on completion of 12 years of service
Tamgha-e-Khidmat (Class-I) (Medal of Service Class I) Admissible to junior commissioned officers (JCOs) only who are in receipt of Tamgha-e-Khidmat (Class-II) award for rendering long meritorious or distinguished service of a non-operational nature
Tamgha-e-Khidmat (Class-II) (Medal of Service Class II) Admissible to junior commissioned officers (JCOs) only for long meritorious or distinguished service of a non-operational nature
Tamgha-e-Khidmat (Class-III) (Medal of Service Class III) Awarded to non-commissioned officers/other ranks for long meritorious or distinguished service of a non-operational nature
Golden Eagle Award Awarded to exceptional fighter pilots of the Pakistan Air Force
President's Medal For Best Shot Awarded to the Best Firer from the whole Army (usually from Infantry Group) during the PAKISTAN ARMY RIFLE ASSOCIATION CENTRAL MEET held annually.

=== Civil Gallantry Awards ===
Nishan-e-Shujaat (Order of Bravery)
Hilal-e-Shujaat (Crescent of Bravery)
Sitara-e-Shujaat (Star of Bravery)
Tamgha-e-Shujaat (Medal of Bravery)

=== Non-Operational Gallantry Awards ===
Sitara-e-Basalat (Star of Valour) A gallantry award admissible to all ranks for acts of valour, courage & devotion to duty though not on active operations against the enemy
Tamgha-e-Basalat (Medal of Valour) Admissible to all ranks for acts of valour, courage & devotion to duty though not on active operations against the enemy

=== Campaign / war medals ===
Tamgha-e-Diffa (Defence Medal) A general campaign medal and is awarded along with a clasp to all ranks who take part in minor operations or campaigns within laid down period, dates and prescribed qualifying area.
Sitara-e-Harb 1965 War (War Star 1965) This medal was awarded to the Armed Forces personnel who took part in the 1965 war in the prescribed area of the operations.
Sitara-e-Harb 1971 War (War Star 1971) This medal was awarded to the Armed Forces personnel who took part in the 1971 war in the prescribed area of the operations.
Tamgha-e-Jang 1965 War (War Medal 1965) A war medal and was awarded to the Armed Forces personnel who were in service during the period of hostilities during the 1965 war.
Tamgha-e-Jang 1971 War (War Medal 1971) A war medal and was awarded to the Armed Forces personnel who were in service during the period of hostilities during the 1971 war.
Tamgha-e-Istaqlal (Escalation with India Medal - 2002) Awarded to all the military servicemen on Active-Duty during the 2001-2002 Standoff with India.
Tamgha-e-Azm (Medal of Conviction) Awarded to military/civil armed officials in 2018 for services rendered in War on Terrorism.
Marka-e-Haq (War for Right Cause), awarded to all serving personals of armed forces of Pakistan during 2025 India–Pakistan conflict.

=== Long service medals ===
10 Years Service Medal
20 Years Service Medal
30 Years Service Medal
35 Years Service Medal
40 Years Service Medal

=== Wound stripes ===
Golden Wound Strip All serving personnel of the Armed Forces seriously or severely wounded during war or operations due to enemy's action while on border defence duties are eligible for the strip.
Red Wound Strip All serving personnel of the Armed Forces wounded during war or operations due to enemy's action while on border defence duties are eligible for the strip.

=== Commemorative medals ===
Pakistan Tamgha (Pakistan Medal) - 1947 Instituted to celebrate the emergence of Pakistan on 14 August 1947.
Tamgha-e-qayam-e-Jamhuria (Republic Commemoration Medal) - 1956 Instituted on the eve of Pakistan becoming a republic on 23 March 1956.
Tamgha-e-Sad Saala Jashan-e-Wiladat-e-Quaid-e-Azam (100th Birth Anniversary of Muhammad Ali Jinnah) - 1976 Instituted to celebrate the birth centenary of Quaid-e-Azam Muhammad Ali Jinnah on 25 December 1976.
Hijri Tamgha (Hijri Medal) - 1979 Instituted to celebrate the completion of the fourteenth centenary Hijri (Islamic Calendar) on 22 November 1979.
President's Award for Pride of Performance - 1982
Jamhuriat Tamgha (Democracy Medal) - 1988 Instituted to celebrate the return of democracy in Pakistan.
Qarardad-e-Pakistan Tamgha (Resolution Day Golden Jubilee Medal)- 1990 Instituted to celebrate the Golden Jubilee of Lahore Resolution
Tamgha-e-Salgirah Pakistan (Independence Day Golden Jubilee Medal) - 1997 Instituted to celebrate the Golden Jubilee of Pakistan
Tamgha-e-Baqa (Nuclear Test Medal) - 1998 Instituted to celebrate the successful testing of a nuclear bomb at Chagai.
Sitara-e-Eisaar (Star of Sacrifice) - 2006 Awarded for outstanding humanitarian services in the wake of the devastating 2005 earthquake in Pakistan
Tamgha-e-Eisaar (Medal of Sacrifice) - 2006 Awarded for outstanding humanitarian services in the wake of the devastating 2005 earthquake in Pakistan
Command and Staff College Quetta Centenary Instructor's Medal (2005)
Command and Staff College Quetta Centenary Student's Medal (2005)

== Order of wearing ==
Precedence	Award name	Ribbon
1	Nishan-e-Haider (Order of Haider)	
2	Nishan-e-Pakistan (Order of Pakistan)	
3	Nishan-e-Shujaat (Order of Bravery)	
4	Nishan-e-Imtiaz (Civilian) (Order of Excellence)	
5	Nishan-e-Imtiaz (Military) (Order of Excellence)	
6	Nishan-e-Quaid-e-Azam (Order of the Great Leader)	
7	Nishan-e-Khidmat (Civilian) (Order of Service)	
8	Hilal-e-Pakistan (Crescent of Pakistan)	
9	Hilal-e-Jurat (Crescent of Courage)	
10	Hilal-e-Shujaat (Crescent of Bravery)	
11	Hilal-e-Imtiaz (Civilian) (Crescent of Excellence)	
12	Hilal-e-Imtiaz (Military) (Crescent of Excellence)	
13	Hilal-e-Quaid-e-Azam (Crescent of the Great Leader)	
14	Hilal-e-Khidmat (Civilian) (Crescent of Service)	
15	Sitara-e-Pakistan (Star of Pakistan)	
16	Sitara-e-Jurat (Star of Courage)	
17	Sitara-e-Shujaat (Star of Bravery)	
18	Sitara-e-Imtiaz (Civilian) (Star of Excellence)	
19	Sitara-e-Imtiaz (Military) (Star of Excellence)	
20	Sitara-e-Quaid-e-Azam (Star of the Great Leader)	
21	President's Award for Pride of Performance	
22	Sitara-e-Basalat (Star of Good Conduct)	
23	Sitara-e-Eisaar (Star of Sacrifice)	
24	Sitara-e-Khidmat (Civilian) (Star of Service)	
25	Tamgha-e-Jurat (Medal of Courage)	
26	Tamgha-e-Shujaat (Medal of Bravery)	
27	Tamgha-e-Imtiaz (Civilian) (Medal of Excellence)	
28	Tamgha-e-Imtiaz (Military) (Medal of Excellence)	
29	Tamgha-e-Quaid-e-Azam (Medal of the Great Leader)	
30	Tamgha-e-Basalat (Medal of Good Conduct)	
31	Tamgha-e-Eisaar (Medal of Sacrifice)	
32	Tamgha-e-Khidmat (Civilian) (Medal of Service)	
33	Imtiazi Sanad (Mentioned in Despatches)	
34	Tamgha-e-Diffa (Defence Medal)	
35	Sitara-e-Harb 1965 War (War Star 1965)	
36	Sitara-e-Harb 1971 War (War Star 1971)	
37	Tamgha-e-Jang 1965 War (War Medal 1965)	
38	Tamgha-e-Jang 1971 War (War Medal 1971)	
39	Tamgha-e-Baqa (Nuclear Test Medal) - 1998	
40	Tamgha-e-Istaqlal (Escalation with India Medal) - 2002	
41	Tamgha-e-Azm (Medal of Conviction)	
42	Tamgha-e-Khidmat (Class-I) (Medal of Service Class I)	
43	Tamgha-e-Khidmat (Class-II) (Medal of Service Class II)	
44	Tamgha-e-Khidmat (Class-III) (Medal of Service Class III)	
45	10 Years Service Medal	
46	20 Years Service Medal	
47	30 Years Service Medal	
48	35 Years Service Medal	
49	40 Years Service Medal	
50	Pakistan Tamgha (Pakistan Medal) - 1947	
51	Tamgha-e-Sad Saala Jashan-e-Wiladat-e-Quaid-e-Azam (100th birth anniversary of Muhammad Ali Jinnah) - 1976	
52	Tamgha-e-Jamhuria (Republic Commemoration Medal) - 1956	
53	Hijri Tamgha (Hijri Medal) - 1979	
54	Jamhuriat Tamgha (Democracy Medal) - 1988	
55	Qarardad-e-Pakistan Tamgha (Resolution Day Golden Jubilee Medal) - 1990	
56	Tamgha-e-Salgirah Pakistan (Independence Day Golden Jubilee Medal) - 1997	
57	Command and Staff College Quetta Instructor's Medal - (2005)	
58	Command and Staff College Quetta Student's Medal - (2005)	

== See also ==
- Military decoration
- Orders, decorations, and medals of Pakistan
