= Derek Joseph =

Pakistani military officer (1945–2021)

Lieutenant Colonel Derek Joseph TJ
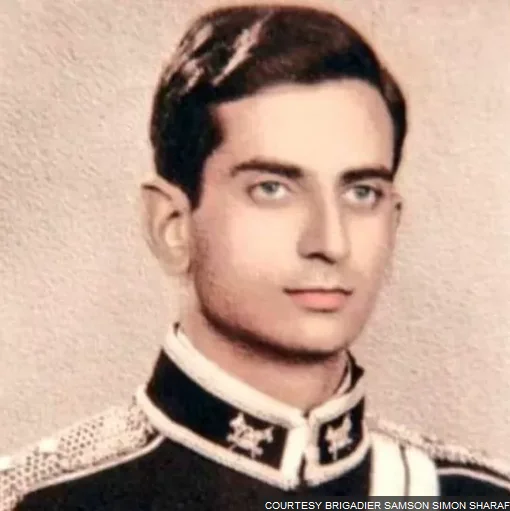
- Born: 13 November 1945; Peshawar, North-West Frontier Province, British India
- Died: 29 July 2021 (aged 75); Peshawar, Khyber Pakhtunkhwa, Pakistan
- Burial place: Old Christian Cemetery, Peshawar
- Education: Edwardes College Peshawar
- Military career
- Allegiance: Pakistan; UAE
- Branch: Pakistan Army; United Arab Emirates Army
- Rank: Lieutenant Colonel
- Conflicts: Indo-Pakistani War of 1971
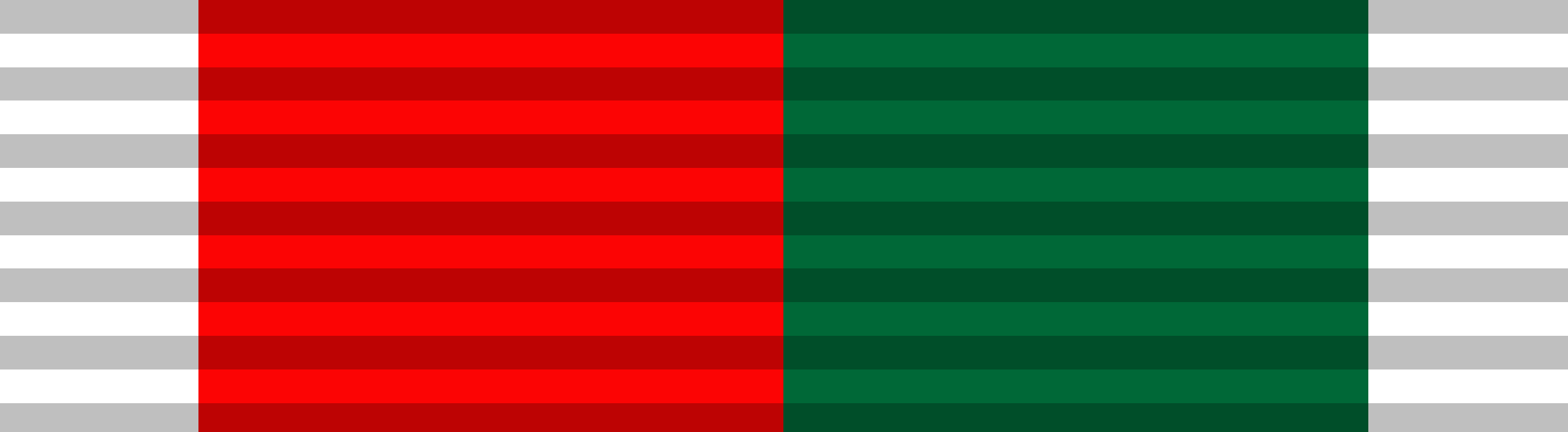
- Awards: Tamgha-i-Jurat

Derek Joseph (Note: Urdu: ڈیرک جوزف; Armenian: Դերեկ Ջոզեֆ) TJ (13 November 1945 – 29 July 2021) was a Pakistani military officer of Armenian descent, and a veteran of the Indo-Pakistani War of 1971, accredited with destroying seven Indian tanks on the West Punjab front. He was awarded Tamgha-i-Jurat for his actions during the war. After the war, Joseph chose to be sent on a Pakistani deputation to the United Arab Emirates Armed Forces, where he served for three years before returning to Pakistan. He retired in the rank of Lieutenant Colonel.

== Personal life ==
Joseph was born on 13 November 1945 in Peshawar, North-West Frontier Province, British India. His brother, Dennis Joseph, a retired professor at Edwardes College, says that their family came from Armenia to Afghanistan and stayed in Kabul and Nangarhar before moving to British India following the withdrawal of British troops from Afghanistan. Joseph's family arrived in Peshawar, capital of then North-West Frontier Province (now known as Khyber Pakhtunkhwa), in 1890 and have remained there ever since. Derek Joseph's father, Dr. Paul Joseph, was a general surgeon at the Mission Hospital in Peshawar and his mother used to teach English at various colleges. . He was a brilliant student of Cantt Public School (CPS) Peshawar and passed Matriculation in 1962-63. He was the Senior Prefect during his school time.

== Military career ==
Joseph was commissioned into the Pakistan Army on 20 April 1969 (40th PMA long course) and later fought in Indo-Pakistan war of 1971. During the war he destroyed seven Indian tanks and was awarded Tamgha-i-Jurat for his valour.

== Possibility of becoming a General ==
Colonel Joseph's friend, Retd Brigadier Muhammad Saad, said that considering Colonel Joseph's abilities, it was clear that he would reach the rank of General, but instead of going to the Command and Staff College in Quetta, Colonel Joseph left Pakistan and joined the United Arab Emirates Armed Forces.

== Death ==
Derek Joseph died on 29 July 2021 in his birthplace, Peshawar. He was found dead in his home after his brother arrived at the home to do a welfare check because he didn't answer his phone call. He was buried with full military honors in a military graveyard. A number of retired Pakistani military personnel and civil servants described Joseph as brave soldier and expressed their grief over the death of Joseph.

== See also ==
- Armenians in Pakistan
- Gurbanmurad Nepesov
