= Tamgha-e-Diffa =

Award of the Pakistan Armed Forces

Tamgha-e-Diffa تمغہِ دفاع
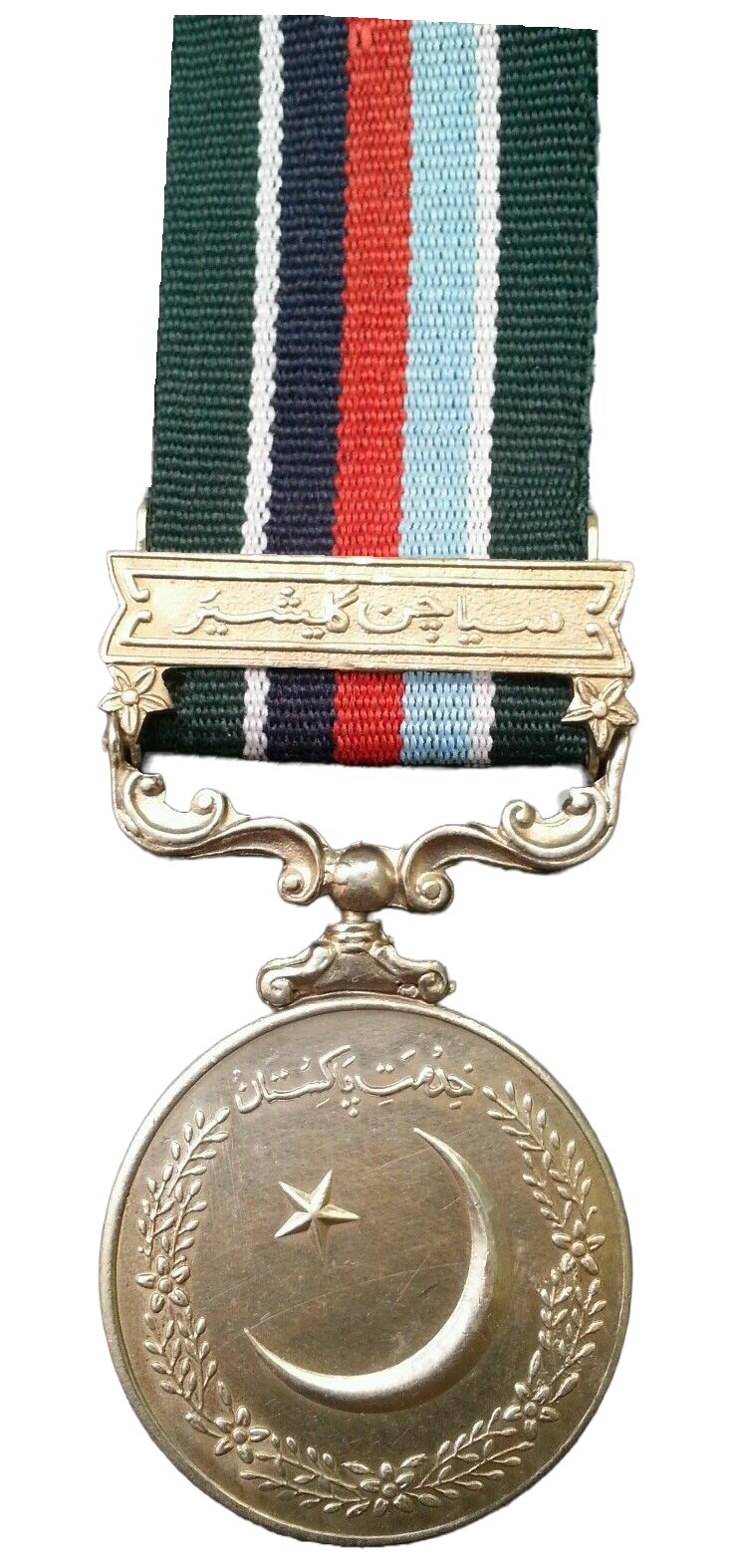
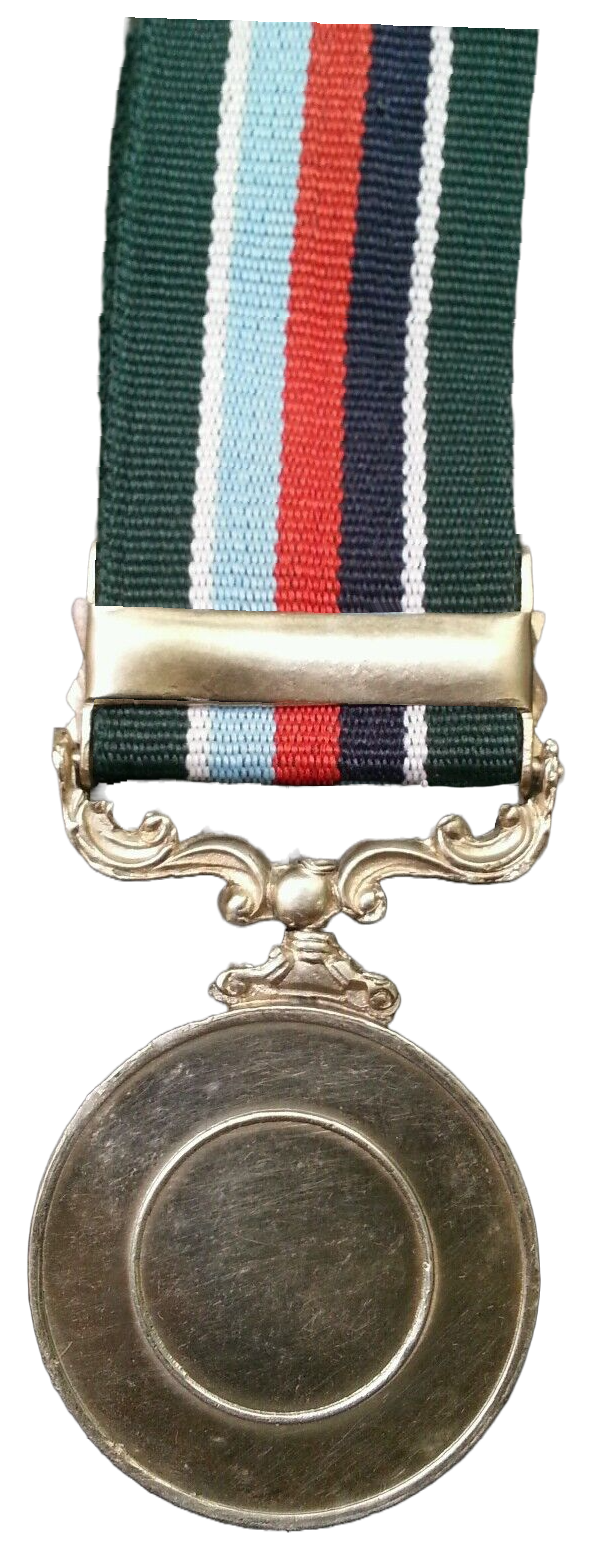
- Tamgha-e-Diffa Medal with Siachen Glacier Clasp; Left: Obverse; Right: Reverse
- Type: Service medal
- Awarded for: Service in minor or major Army, Air Force or Navy operations for which no separate medal was intended.
- Presented by: Pakistan
- Eligibility: Pakistan Armed Forces Personnel
- Ribbon: Tamgha-e-Diffa; Ribbon
- Clasps: First Kashmir War; Dir-Bajaur Campaign (1960-61); Second Kashmir War; Kutch 1965; Siachen Glacier; Shaqma
- Status: Only Siachen Glacier Clasp still being awarded.
- Established: 1957

Precedence
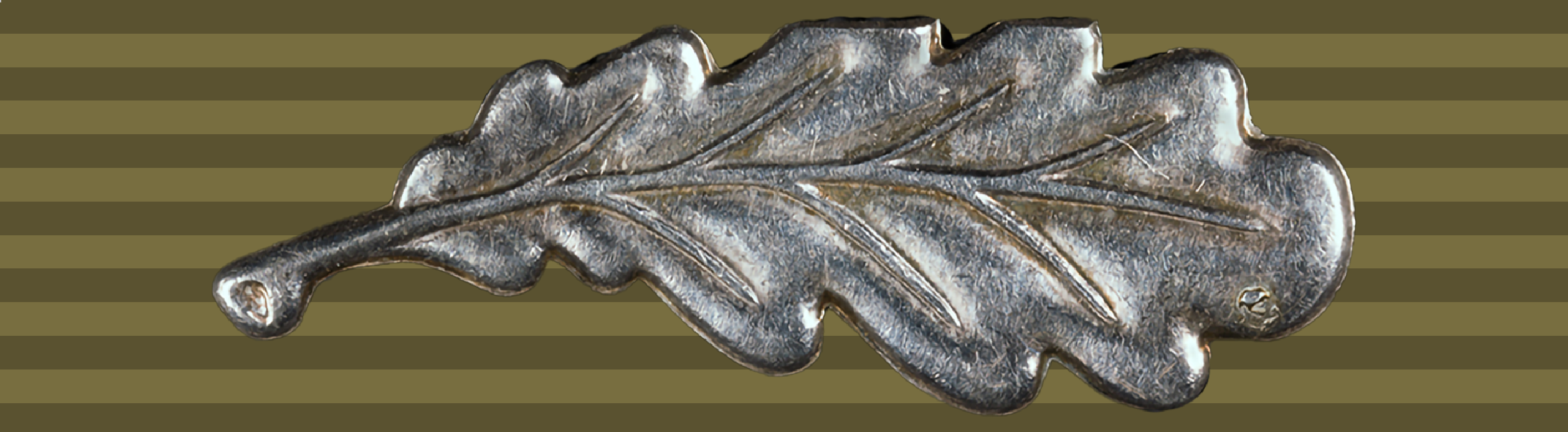
- Next (higher): Imtiazi Sanad

- Next (lower): Sitara-e-Harb; 1965 War

Tamgha-e-Diffa (Urdu: تمغہِ دفاع, lit. '(Defence Medal)' is a Pakistani general campaign medal and is awarded along with a clasp to all ranks who take part in minor operations or campaigns within a laid down period, dates and prescribed qualifying area.

== History ==
The Pakistani continuation of the general service medal tradition came in 1957 (after attaining status as a republic) when the Tamgha-e-Diffa (General Service Medal) was established by notification No.F.40(3)/Pres./57 of 16 March 1957, by the President of Pakistan. As with India, there had been pre-republic discussion of the medal, and a draft warrant and design - with the cipher of Queen Elizabeth II - had been drawn up but was never instituted.

It is given for minor and major military campaigns and operations for which no separate medal was intended.

== Appearance ==
=== Obverse ===
A 36-mm circular copper-nickel medal. Star and crescent in the center, surrounded by a wreath. Above, the inscription "Khidmat-e-Pakistan" (In The Service of Pakistan) in Urdu is written. Suspended from an ornate straight-bar swivelling suspender and a clasp with the campaign relevant to the award; bars both in English and bilingual bars in Urdu/Bengali have been seen (Until 1971). The medal has also been seen and reported in gilt, but this seems to be a totally unofficial modification.

The ribbon is 33 mm, green, with central stripes of dark blue, red, light blue, edged with thinner white stripes. Green 7 mm, white 2 mm, dark blue 5 mm, red 5 mm, light blue 5 mm, white 2 mm, green 7 mm.

=== Reverse ===
Plain, open circle in the center. The medal is rarely seen named.

== Service Ribbon Insignia ==
The ribbon is 33mm; Green with central stripes of Dark Blue (Navy), Red (Army) and Sky Blue (Air Force), edged with thin White stripes.

=== Ribbon Size ===
Green 7mm, White 2mm, Dark Blue 5mm, Red 5mm, Sky Blue 5mm, White 2mm and Green 7mm.

== Clasps ==
Tamgha-e-Diffa is awarded with a clasp designating the qualifying service of the recipient. There are seven total clasps for the medal.

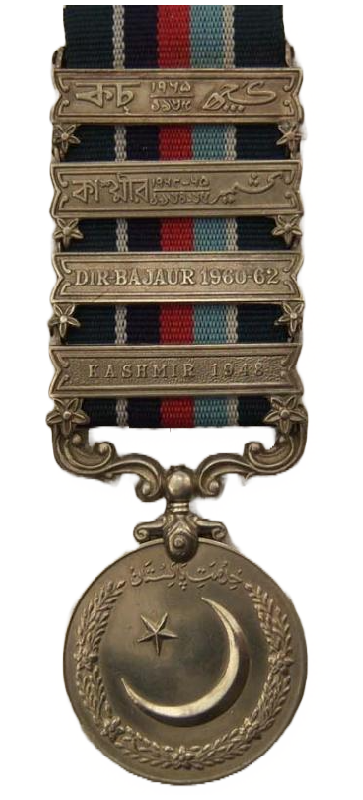
Tamgha-e-Diffa with all the Clasps except Siachen Glacier and Shaqma

=== Kashmir 1947–48 ===
Monolingual in English. Awarded for operational service rendered by military personnel from October 1947 to 1 January 1949 in the first Indo-Pakistan war in Kashmir.

=== Dir-Bajaur 1960–62 ===
Monolingual in English. Awarded for the suppression of "tribal" rebellions in the North-West Frontier Province. (See: Bajaur Campaign)

=== Kashmir 1964–65 ===
Bilingual in Urdu and Bengali.

Awarded to recognise the services of the personnel employed on border defence duties in KASHMIR between 1 January 1964 and 5 September 1965 (both days inclusive). It was awarded to the following:

1. Personnel of the Pakistan Army, Azad Kashmir Regular Forces, Pakistan Air Force.
2. Personnel of the Frontier Corps and West Pakistan Rangers under command of the Army, Activated Mujahids of the Pakistan Mujahid Force and Azad Kashmir.
3. All Police Battalions, Frontier Constabulary, Azad Kashmir Police, and Azad Kashmir Police Reserves and Azad Kashmir Rangers, under command of the Armed Forces.
4. Civilians employed with the Pakistan Armed Forces and Azad Kashmir Regular Forces.

==== Operational Areas ====
1. All area south-east of line starting from the point NJ 9739 — CHINGAR NH 6882 — ASTORE NG 8268 — Boundary Junction NG 1133 — CHAK GHIA NV 9275 — PIND AZIZ NV 9976 — PIR KHANA NQ 0371 — KALUK NW 0862 — BHIMBER NULLAH NW 1460 — MUSA NW 2032 — MIANUDDIN NW 2628— FATEHPUR NW 3125 — MARI NW 5640 then along west bank of the river CHENAB up to Boundary Junction 6850.
2. GILGIT-BALTISTAN Agencies.

==== Eligibility ====
Pakistan Army: If they were borne on the strength or were attached to a Formation, Unit or Detachment employed on border defence duties in the operational areas between 1 January 1964 and 5 September 1965, (both days inclusive) and remained as such for at least 45 days between 1 January 1964 and 31 July 1965 (both days inclusive) or for 7 days between 1 August 1965 and 31 August 1965 (both days inclusive) or for 1 day between 1 September 1965 and 5 September 1965 (both days inclusive), except that personnel of the Army Aviation shall be eligible for the Clasp if they carried out at least three operational sorties between 1 January 1964 and 31 July 1965 (both days inclusive), or one operational sortie between 1 August 1965 and 5 September 1965, (both days inclusive).

Pakistan Air Force: Personnel of the Pakistan Air Force who carried out three operational sorties or were mobilized and remained so in direct support of six such operational sorties between 1 January 1964 and 31 July 1965 (both days inclusive) or carried out one operational sortie or were mobilized and remained so in direct support of two such operational sorties between 1 August 1965 and 5 September 1965 (both days inclusive).

The Clasp "KASHMIR 1964-65" to the TAMGHA-E-DIFFA was also conferrable on the following personnel, who served in the operational areas, irrespective of the duration of their stay in that area, namely:

1. Those whose services in the operational areas ended by death, wounded, sickness attributable to service or capture by the enemy.
2. Those who were awarded gallantry decorations irrespective of other conditions.
3. The personnel of 19 BALUCH who were employed on specific missions during the operations between 1 January 1964 and 5 September 1965 (both days inclusive) in the operational areas.

=== Kutch 1965 ===
Bilingual in Urdu and Bengali.

Awarded to recognise the services of the personnel employed in the RANN of KUTCH operations between 6 April 1965 and 30 June 1965.

The Clasp "KUTCH 1965" was conferrable on the following categories of personnel:

1. Personnel of the Pakistan Army, Pakistan Navy and Pakistan Air Force.
2. Personnel of West Pakistan Rangers under command of the Army and Activated Mujahids of the Pakistan Mujahid Force.
3. All Police Battalions under command of the Army and Civilians who were employed with the Army.

==== Operational Areas ====
1. Area BADIN (District HYDERABAD) and DIPLO (District THARPARKAR) bounded by BADIN map sheet 40D UK 24, NAOKOT map sheet 40H UK 96, CHACHRO map sheet 40K QF 89, DOST JOTAR map sheet 40K GQ 59, along boundary de-facto line to SINDORI map sheet 40L QM 49, DING map sheet 40H UK 50, SALT CHOKI map sheet 40D UK 20.
2. Sea adjoining RANN of KUTCH, East of Long 660° E. between Lat. 22° N to 25° N. Area BADIN (District HYDERABAD) and DIPLO (District THARPARKAR) bounded by BADIN map sheet 40D UK24, NAOKOT map sheet 40K UK 96, CHACHRO map 40K QF 89, DOST JOTAR map sheet 40K GQ 59, along boundary de-facto line to SINDORI map sheet 40L QM 49, DING map sheet 40H UK 50, SALT CHOKI map sheet 40D UK 20.

==== Eligibility ====
Pakistan Army: If they were borne on the strength or were attached to a Formation, Unit or Detachment employed on border defence duties in the operational

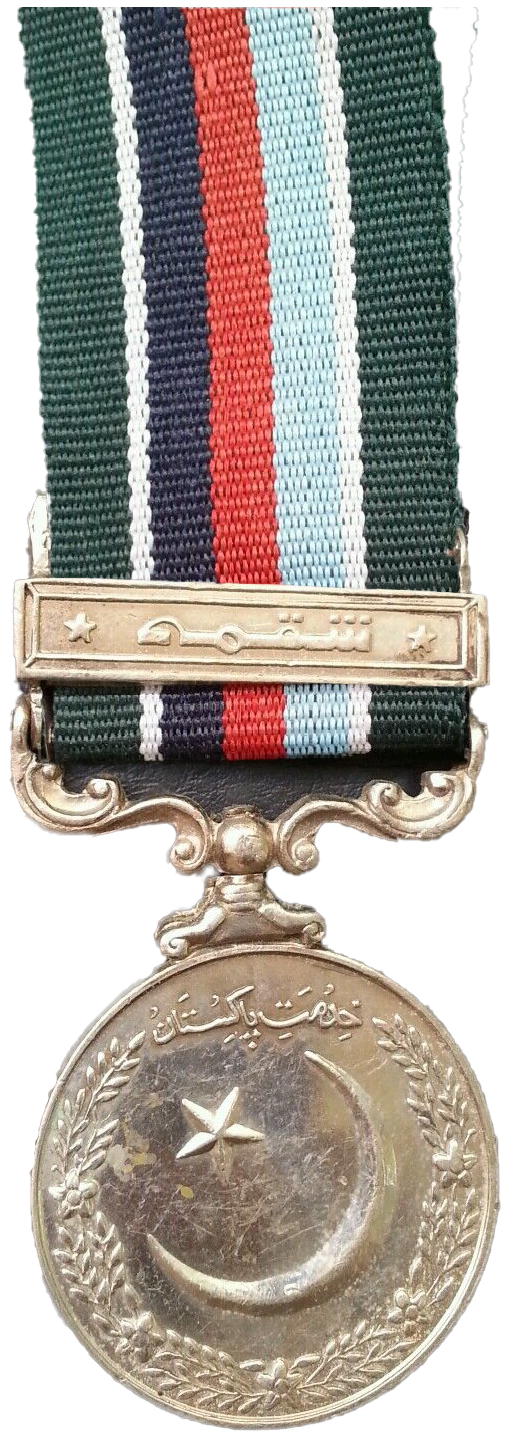
Tamgha-e-Diffa Shaqma Clasp

areas between 6 April 1965 and 30 June 1965 (both days inclusive) and remained as such for at least 21 days. Personnel of the Army Aviation shall be eligible if they carried out one operational sortie between 6 April 1965 and 30 June 1965 (both days inclusive). Personnel of the Pakistan Air Force shall also be eligible if they carried out one operational sortie or were mobilized and remained so in direct support of three such operational sorties between 6 April 1965 and 30 June 1965 (both days inclusive).

The Clasp "KUTCH 1965" to the TAMGHA-E-DIFFA was also conferrable on the following personnel, who served in the operational areas, irrespective of the duration of their stay in that area, namely:

1. Those whose services in the operational areas ended by death, wounded, sickness attributable to service or capture by the enemy.
2. Those who were awarded gallantry decorations or an IMTIAZI SANAD (Mentioned in Dispatches) for their services in the operational area between 6 April 1965 and 30 June 1965 (both days inclusive).
3. The personnel of 19 BALUCH who were employed on specific missions during the operations between 6 April 1965 and 30 June 1965 (both days inclusive), in the operational area.

=== Siachen Glacier ===
Awarded since 1984 to Army personnel posted along the Siachen Glacier in Skardu with the FCNA and NLI. The Siachen Dispute and conflict remain unresolved. This Clasp is still being awarded.

=== Shaqma ===
Awarded for service in the 1999 Kargil War (Shaqma Sector). The clasp is monolingual in Urdu and while most clasps are in Nastaliq Script, this clasp is in Urdu in the Kufic Script.

== See also ==
- Awards and decorations of the Pakistan Armed Forces
