= Aurangzeb (name) =

Aurangzeb is a masculine given name and a surname. Notable people with the name are as follows:

== Given name ==
- Aurangzeb, seventh Mughal emperor
- Aurangzeb Ahmed
- Aurangzeb Chowdhury

== Surname ==
- Marriyum Aurangzeb
- Muhammad Aurangzeb
- Tahira Aurangzeb
