= Tamgha-e-Khidmat =

Tamgha-e-Khidmat تمغہِ خدمت
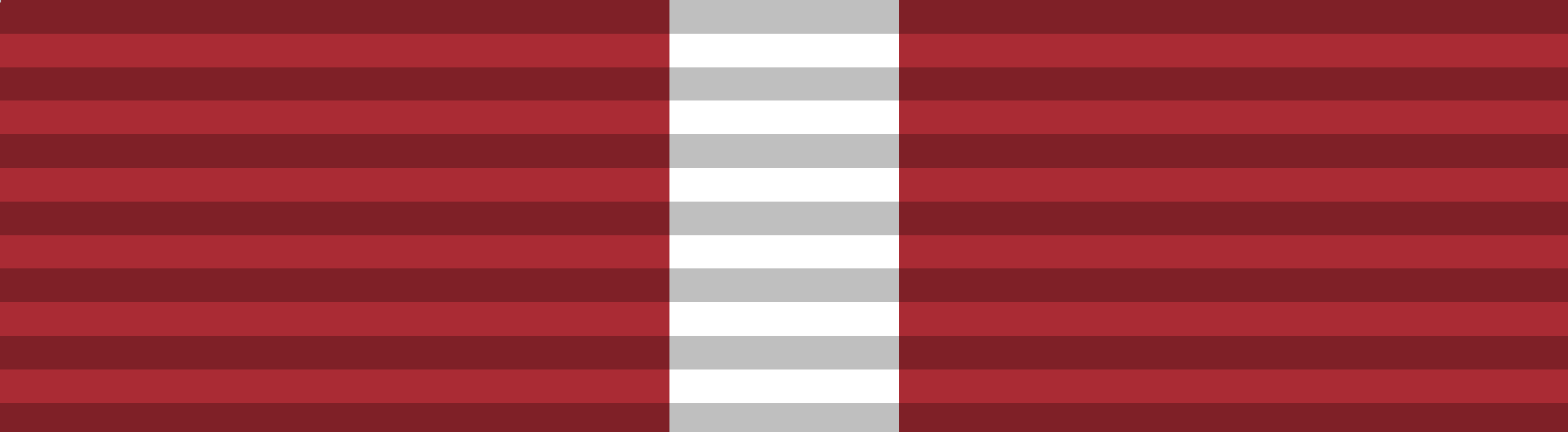
- Type: Military Decoration
- Awarded for: “...long meritorious or distinguished service of a non-operational nature”.
- Country: Pakistan
- Presented by: Government of Pakistan
- Eligibility: Military and Civil Armed Forces persons only
- Status: Currently awarded
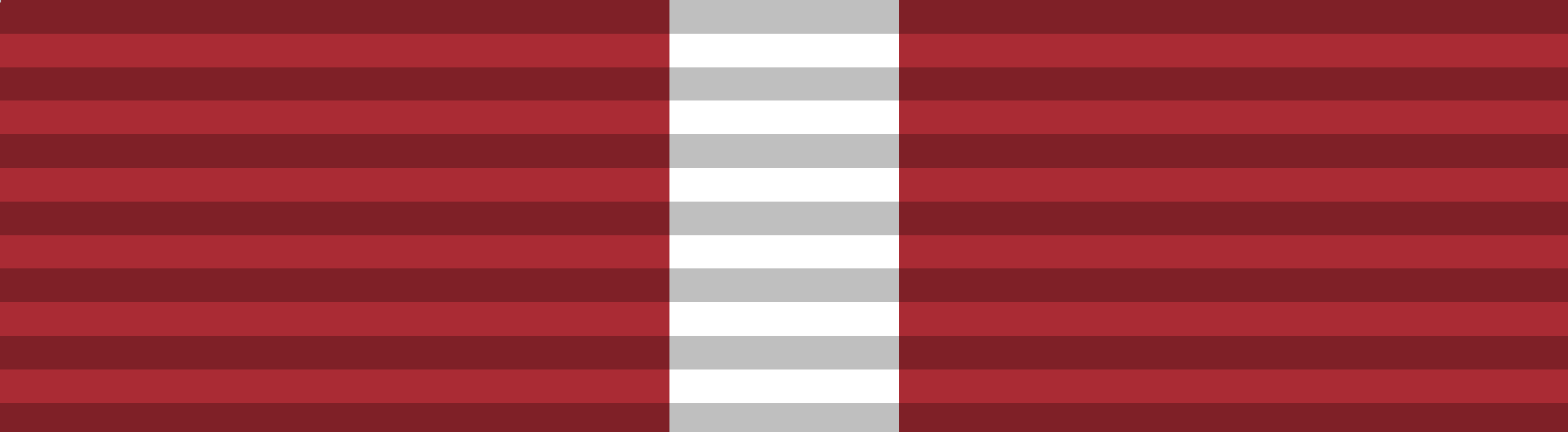
- Service ribbon of Tamgha-i-Khidmat (Class-I)

Precedence
- Next (higher): Imtiazi Sanad

Tamgha-e-Khidmat or Tamgha-i-Khidmat (Urdu: تمغہِ خدمت, literally “medal of service”) is a civilian and military award of the Islamic Republic of Pakistan. In Pakistan Army, it is applicable to junior commissioned officers, in addition to personnel of the Frontier Corps and the Frontier Constabulary. It is given to those Frontier Constabulary personnel who are serving or have served under the federal government. This award is also given to chief petty officers of the Pakistan Navy, flight sergeants of the Pakistan Air Force and non-commissioned officers with the equivalent ranks of the eligible forces such as land-based army, air force and navy.

Also given below the rank of junior commissioned officers, the Tamgha-e-Khidmat is usually awarded for rendering “long meritorious or distinguished service of a non-operational nature”.

== Class ==
TAMGHA-e-KHIDMAT (CIVILIAN)
Nishan-e-Khidmat	Sitara-e-Khidmat	Tamgha-e-Khidmat

TAMGHA-e-KHIDMAT (MILITARY)
Class I	Class II	Class III

== See also ==
- Pakistani Armed Forces
- Awards and decorations of the Pakistan military
