= Air Force Strategic Command (Pakistan) =

- Active: 1985; 41 years ago
- Country: Pakistan
- Branch: Pakistan Air Force
- Type: NC2 and C4ISTAR
- Role: Strategic deterrence Aerial-based second strike capability
- HQ/Garrison: Air HQ in Islamabad

Commanders
- Director-General of C4Istar: AVM Khalid Mehmood
- Commander: AVM Syed Inamullah
- Notable commanders: ACM Zaheer Ahmad Babar Sidhu

The Pakistan Air Force Strategic Command (Reporting name:AFSC) is one of the major regional formations of the Pakistan Air Force headquartered at the Air HQ in Islamabad.

The Air Force Strategic Command provides the combat readiness to conduct aerial-based strategic deterrence through maintaining the operational command and control over the nuclear weapons together with the Navy's counterpart.

== History ==
Since 1970s, the Pakistan Air Force had been training an elite class of fighter pilots at their Combat Commanders School (CCS), which is roughly based on the USAF Weapons School, for carrying out the strike operations and strategic bombing missions.

The Pakistan Air Force's military leadership established the formation for strategic mission to subvert and mitigate the threats from India to target Pakistan's national laboratories, which it was being planned with Israel based on their previous mission in Iraq. On routine basis, the Pakistan Air Force fighter pilots began their combat air patrol missions while learning and training on targeting India's nuclear sites.

After the F-16 Fighting Falcons were inducted in the Pakistan Air Force in 1983, Air Chief Marshal Anwar Shamim, then-Chief of Air Staff, decided to establish the strategic command dedicated for protecting and providing combat readiness to conduct strategic deterrence from foreign adversaries.

The Air Force's strategic command also provided the platform to the PAF's fighter pilots to practiced and later mastered the "toss-bombing"— a method developed by the United States Air Force to deliver nuclear weapons from fighter jets in 1990s. In 1998, the strategic command rotated its nuclear weapons-related mission by flying F-16 on an air patrol to provide cover to the C-130s planes transporting the nuclear devices in knock-down assembly to the nuclear test site in Balochistan.

=== Employment ===
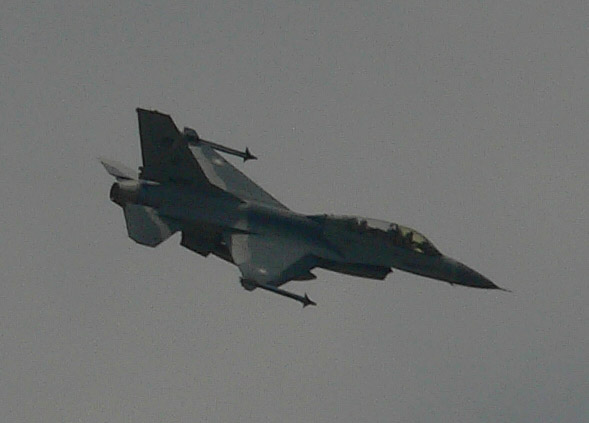
An earlier version of PAF's F-16B from the No. 11 Sq. Arrows flying over Lahore in 2006

The Pakistan Air Forces controls and maintains the operation control of the nuclear weapons including their launch codes, target selections, satellites, interoperability, radars, and military computers. In a sharp contrast to the Pakistan Army's and Navy's strategic command, the Pakistan Air Force's strategic command is far more secretive and more mission oriented with very few details of its mission available from outside sources. Even the Inter-Services Public Relations (ISPR) of the Pakistani military has acknowledged very little of its achievements, with its commanders routinely assigned new mission parameters.

In past, the No. 11 Squadron (Arrows) were part of the Air Force Strategic Command; the Arrows has F-16s (variant A/B) which are understood to be nuclear weapons delivery capable.

It has been understood that the No. 16 Squadron (Black Panthers) and the No. 26 Squadron (Black Spiders), have been reported as likely to be tasked with the delivery of nuclear weapons. In 1998, the Black Panthers and Black Spiders were rotated and stationed in PAF Base Masroor in Karachi but were redeployed at the PAF Base Peshawar as early as in 1999. Due to its control over the nuclear weapons, the Air Force's strategic command routinely moves the aircraft, devices, its personnels, and their delivery mechanisms all over the country and practice combat delivery of nuclear weapons quarterly. The No. 15 Sqd. (Cobras), No. 25 Sqd. (Eagles) and No. 27 Sqd. (Zarrar) are also widely suspected of the part of the strategic command since they have ability to carry and deliver nations' nuclear standoff weapon system.

== Director Generals ==
Commanders of the Air Force Strategic Command
Officer Commanding Air Force Strategic Command	Start of Tenure	End of Tenure
Air Vice Marshal Tameez Uddin Shakir Qazi	2017	2019
Air Vice Marshal Ahsen Rafique	2019	October 2020
Air Vice Marshal Tariq Zia	October 2020	August 2021
Air Vice Marshal Imtiaz Sattar	August 2021	January 2024
Air Vice Marshal Muhammad Ehsan Ul Haq	January 2024	March 2026
Air Vice Marshal Aurangzeb Ahmed	March 2026	August 2026
Air Vice Marshal Syed Inamullah	September 2026	Incumbent
