= Armenians in Pakistan =

- (Armenia) (Pakistan)
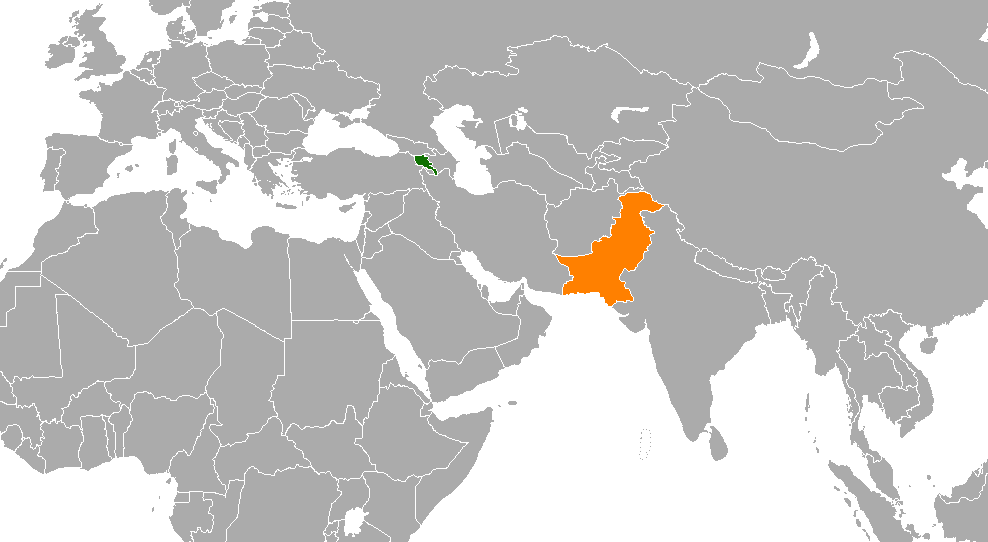

Total population
- Unknown, perhaps several thousand descendants.

Regions with significant populations
- Islamabad, Karachi and Lahore.

Languages
- Sindhi, Urdu, Punjabi, Armenian and other Languages of Pakistan.

Religion
- Majority Christianity

The Armenians in Pakistan are ethnic Armenians living in the present country of Pakistan. Armenians migrated to Karachi during the economic boom in the early 20th century. Notable Armenian settlements in Pakistan can be found in the cities of Karachi, Lahore and in the capital Islamabad.

== History ==
The Ottoman and the Safavid conquests of the Armenian highlands in the 15th century CE meant that many Armenians dispersed across the Ottoman and Safavid empires, with some eventually reaching Mughal India. During the period of Akbar, Armenians – such as Akbar's wife Mariam Begum Saheba and a Chief Justice Abdul Hai – gained prestige in the empire. While Armenians gained prestige serving as governors and generals elsewhere in India such as Delhi and the Bengal, they were also present in Lahore.

Armenian inscriptions from 1606 and 1618 have been found by archaeologists in 1901 in the Thal Chotiali, Loralai District, in Balochistan. There was an Armenian colony established there in the beginning of the 17th century. In 1908, a British officer wrote that

No Armenian colonies could be traced in the Kalat Agency. We should therefore have to assume that the reputed settlers of the seventeenth century, on their conversion to Islam, have become completely merged in the indigenous Brahui and Baloch tribes.

There was a large Armenian colony in Lahore as early as the 16th century, in the time of the Mughal Empire. Lahore also had an enclosed Armenian quarter near Lahore Fort with an Armenian church and cemetery, and Christian Armenian and Georgian gunners were in the employ of the governor Mir Mannu during its invasion by Ahmad Shah Durrani; members of the Dutch East India Company's expeditions to Lahore noted many Armenian priests. Armenians prospered there, and while most were general merchants, members of the community were also noted as owners of breweries and wine-shops. There was a church in Lahore "used by Armenian Christian traders" under the Mughal Emperor Akbar.

In 1711, there was a Bishop of the Armenian Apostolic Church in Lahore. However, many Armenians, including twenty merchants with their families, fled from the city after a Mughul governor threatened them. The community of the 17th and 18th centuries was greatly reduced, but with the arrival of British India, an Armenian presence continued in this part of the South Asia until the early 20th century. In 1907, the remaining Armenians in Lahore were visited by Armenian Archbishop Sahak Ayvadian, a primate of the Indian Diocese in Calcutta.

== Notable people ==
- Derek Joseph

== See also ==
- Armenian diaspora
- Armenia–Pakistan relations
- Armenians in India
- Armenians in Bangladesh
- Turks in Pakistan
