= Armenia–Pakistan relations =

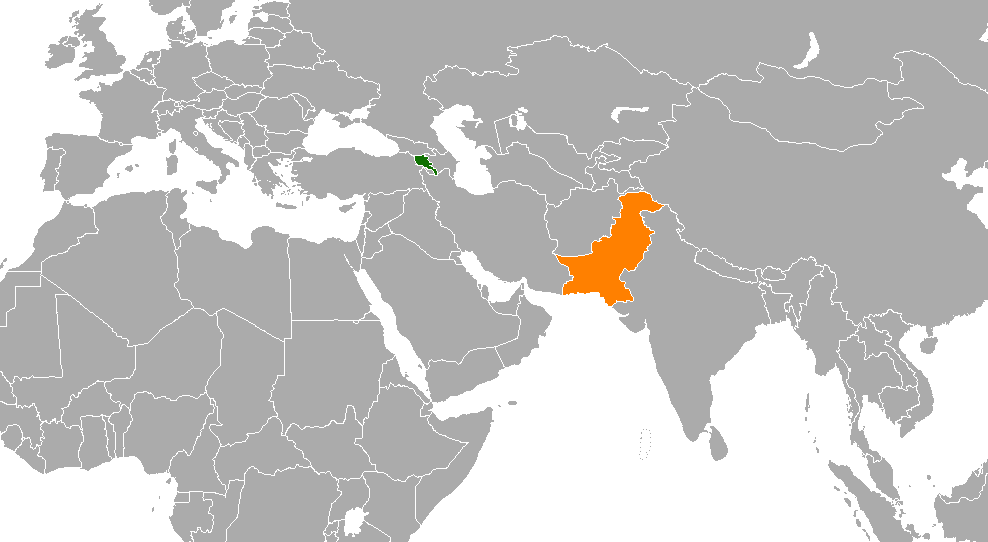

- Armenia: Pakistan

The Republic of Armenia and the Islamic Republic of Pakistan established bilateral relations on 31 August 2025.

== Recognition ==
=== Initial non-recognition by Pakistan ===
Prior to establishment of diplomatic relations, it was widely held that Pakistan did not recognize Armenia as a state, owing to its close support for Azerbaijan and Turkey. The non-recognition seems to have been a political mistake that went unaddressed for decades (as most Pakistanis were not aware of this non-recognition and the topic of Armenia was barely discussed in Pakistan’s domestic discourse).

=== Relations prior to formalizing diplomatic ties ===
Historically, Pakistan refused to "recognize" Armenia due to the Nagorno-Karabakh conflict between Armenia and Azerbaijan, despite the fact that Armenia and Azerbaijan have themselves always recognised each other as sovereign states ever since they both gained independence during the dissolution of the Soviet Union in 1991. Pakistan, which recognised Azerbaijani sovereignty in 1991, declared that recognition of Armenia would be contingent on the Armenians relinquishing their claim to Nagorno-Karabakh, as well as an end to the Armenian military presence in that disputed territory. Likewise, Pakistan openly supported Azerbaijan during the First Nagorno-Karabakh War and the Second Nagorno-Karabakh War; it has strongly advocated full Azerbaijani control over Nagorno-Karabakh, which has historically had an Armenian-majority population, though it is internationally recognised as a part of Azerbaijan.

Amidst the 2023 Azerbaijani military offensive, over 100,000 Armenians were displaced from Nagorno-Karabakh, triggering the collapse of the Armenia-backed Republic of Artsakh. The United Nations has stated from local reports that there are between 50 and 1000 Armenians remaining in the region. On 20 September 2023, one day after Azerbaijan's offensive began, the Pakistani Foreign Ministry released an official statement reaffirming Pakistan's "unwavering support for the sovereignty and territorial integrity of Azerbaijan" in Nagorno-Karabakh.

== History ==
=== Pakistan and the Nagorno-Karabakh conflict ===
Pakistan was the third country, after Turkey and Romania, to recognize Azerbaijan, and has close relations with it as it relates to conflicts in the Nagorno-Karabakh region. Pakistan had supported Azerbaijan during the First Nagorno-Karabakh War. In 2015, Pakistan declared that recognizing Armenia's independence is contingent on the latter's military leaving Karabakh. In 2020, Pakistan supported Azerbaijan in the Second Nagorno-Karabakh War and hailed the subsequent ceasefire, which brought Azerbaijan territorial gains.

=== Armenia, Pakistan, and India ===
At the end of 2016, Armenian–Pakistani relations further deteriorated, and Armenia vetoed Pakistan's bid for observer status in the Russian-led Collective Security Treaty Organization (CSTO) Parliamentary Assembly.

In 2019 after an interview with WION, Prime Minister Nikol Pashinyan stated that Armenia supported India in the Kashmir conflict between India and Pakistan.

=== Establishment of relations ===
On August 31 2025, diplomatic relations were established, resulting in Pakistan effectively recognizing Armenia. Formal relations were established through a joint communique between Armenian Foreign Minister Ararat Mirzoyan and Pakistani Foreign Minister Ishaq Dar on the sidelines of the 2025 Shanghai Cooperation Organisation summit in Tianjin, China.

In July 2026, Armenian President Vahagn Khachaturyan appointed Karen Grigoryan as Armenia's ambassador to Pakistan, while he continues as ambassador to the United Arab Emirates.

On September 11, 2026, Pakistan appointed its first ambassador to Armenia after establishing diplomatic ties in 2025, as Ambassador Shafqat Ali Khan presented his credentials to the Armenian president. Ambassador Khan concurrently serves as Pakistan's ambassador to the UAE and as non-resident Ambassador to Armenia.

== See also ==
- Armenians in Pakistan
- Foreign relations of Armenia
- Foreign relations of Pakistan
