= Tamgha-e-Jurat =

Fourth-highest military award of Pakistan

Tamgha-e-Jurat تمغہِ جرأت
- Type: Military Decoration
- Awarded for: "... Gallant and distinguished service performed in combat..."
- Presented by: Government of Pakistan
- Eligibility: Military only (Conferrable on all ranks)
- Post-nominals: TJ
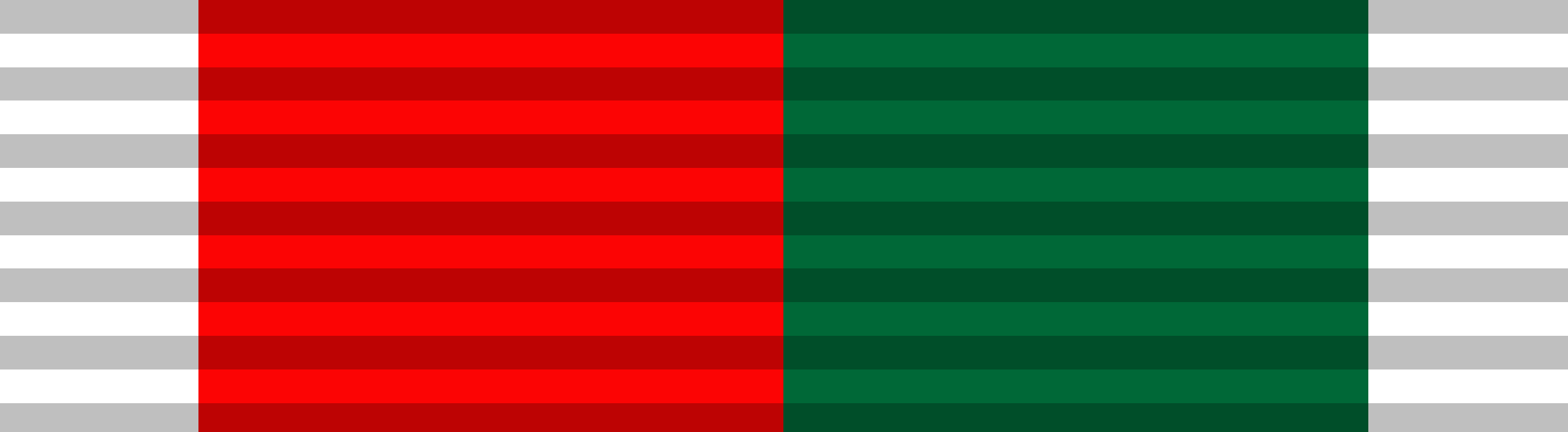
- Ribbon
- Status: Currently awarded
- Established: 16 March 1957
- Final award: Squadron Leader Hassan Siddiqui

Precedence
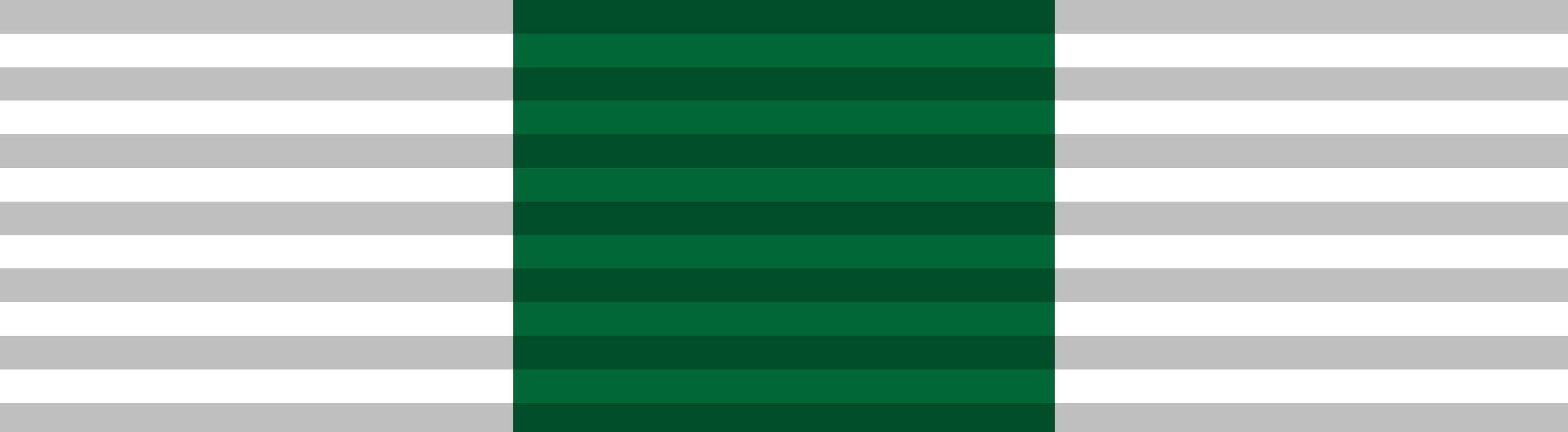
- Next (higher): Sitara-e-Jurat

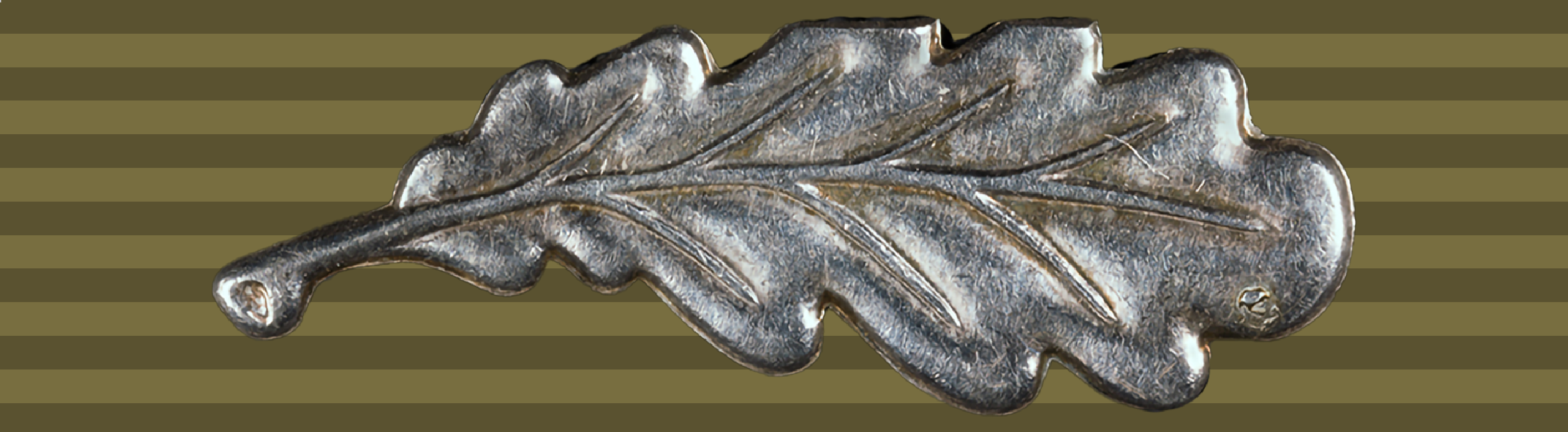
- Next (lower): Imtiazi Sanad

Tamgha-e-Jurat (Urdu: تمغہِ جرأت, lit. 'Medal of Courage'), is the fourth highest military award of Pakistan. This citation is awarded for extraordinary heroism while engaged in armed combat with an opposing force on Pakistan soil or outside its borders. The award was established in 1957 after Pakistan became a republic, however, it was instituted retrospectively back to 1947. This medal is awarded for various types of high risk tactical missions like combat, tactical reconnaissance and infiltration and can be bestowed upon all ranks, commissioned officers and non-commissioned officers, in the Pakistan Army, Navy, Air Force, and the paramilitary Civil Armed Forces such as the Frontier Corps, the Frontier Constabulary and the Pakistan Rangers. Ranked below the Sitara-e-Jurat on the order of precedence, the Tamgha-e-Jurat is the equivalent to the Military Cross in the U.K Commonwealth honours system and the Silver Star in the United States honours system.

== List of Recipients ==
Pakistan Army

- Maj. Ali Jawwad Khan Changezi shaheed TJ (11 cavalry), embraced martyrdom in 2016
- Brigadier Syed Imran Naqvi TJ,(Retd) Director Productions ISPR was also awarded TJ.
- Subaidar Abdul Aziz Magray, TJ 1971
- Sep. Noor Muhammad Shaheed (from Bannu)TJ 51 Panjab (Now 15 Sindh) regiment, Date of Shahadat (4.12.1971) in ponch op at Chand sector Kashmir
- Sep. Farman Ali from Shishakt, Hunza (1st Punjab Regiment) TJ, 1948
- Maj. Habib-ur-Rehman Qureshi AJK, 1971
- Sub Zulifqar Ali Operation Al Meezan 2012/13
- Lieutenant Colonel Derek Joseph, 1971
- Lt. Col. Muhammad Akram Khan (Mardan) Embraced Martyrdom on 05-Dec-1971 at the age of 28
- Lance Havaldar Laal Khan SSG(Baloch Regiment), TJ, 1958
- Capt. Aftab Ahmed TJ
- Hon. Capt Falak Sher TJ 1971
- Capt Ghulam Murtaza Cheema TJ 1965
- Havaldar Muhammad Karim NLI (15 July) (TJ) 1999
- Sepoy Liaquat Ali, 1 Sind Regiment while serving with 24 Sind Regt 1999
- Naik Manzur Hussain TJ 3 Punjab 1965 War
- 2339221 Havaldar Sikandar Khan TJ Posthumously 3 Punjab 1965 War
- Khushi Muhammad TJ TK1 1965
- Lance Naik Laal Hussain TJ 1965
- Defedar Rana Abdul Majeed Khan, TJ 1965
- Col. Mirza Hassan Khan
- Capt Sabir Shah TJ
- N/Sub Ibarat Shah TJ, Northern Scout 1947
- Hav. Khayal Akbar Khan Orakazi, TJ,(7 FF 1948)
- Havaldar Hukamdad Abbasi TJ
- Lance Naik Shadab Wali Khan TJ, 39 Baloch 1971
- Sep/Clk Muhammad Akbar TJ, 4 Punjab, 1971
- Col/ Muhammad Saleem TJ
- Maj/ Muhammad Iftikhar Ahmad TJ, 1971, Army Aviation, Choor Sector
- Sep Muhmad Ghraz (6 NLI) TJ, 1999
- Cap. Asfandyar Bukhari (11 FFR) TJ 1, 2015
- Captain Roohullah (Baloch Light Commando Battalion), 2016
- Lance Nayek Syed Munawar Hussain Shah (3 FFR) TJ, 1965
- Lt Khalil Ahmad Shaheed (650 Mujahid Regiment) TJ, 1991
- Subaidar Raja Mehrban Khan Minhas (Kahuta, Narh) - 1965 13FF
- Lance Naik Muhammad Din TJ 1948
- Subaidar Ali Madad

Pakistan Air Force

Gallantry 1965

- Flying Officer Muhammad Hamidullah Khan TJ, SH, 1965 - (doc. 30.06.62 34TH GD (P) Course no. 1 SQN), Pakistan Air Force Academy, Risalpur; Sialkot- Pathankot infiltration, from Pakistan Air Force Base Chaklala, Rawalpindi. 29.03.1971 defected allegiance to BDF, then as Flight Lieutenant, Asst. Provost Marshal, CO - No. 5 P&S Unit (Provost and Security), Dacca

Posthumous 1965

Gallantry 1965

- Master Warrant Officer M Ashfaq TJ
- Master Warrant Officer M Hafeez TJ
- Corporal M Omer Ali TJ
- Corporal Sher Mohammad TJ
- Corporal Technician Ghulam Abbas TJ
- Corporal Technician Muhammad Ghazanfar Pak 76361 TJ

Posthumous 1971

- Flight Lieutenant Javed Iqbal TJ
- Flight Lieutenant Syed Shahid Raza TJ

Gallantry 1971

- Flight Lieutenant Ghulam Murtaza Malik TJ
- Flight Lieutenant Taloot Mirza TJ
- Flight Lieutenant Maqsood Amir TJ
- Flight Lieutenant Javed Latif TJ
- Flight Lieutenant Abdul Karim Bhatti TJ
- Warrant Officer Abdul Haq shah TJ
- Senior Technician Sajjad A Shah TJ
- Senior Technician Asghar Ali TJ
- Corporal Muhammad Ghazanfar TJ
- Corporal M Afzal Abbasi TJ
- Junior Technician Muhammad Latif TJ

Gallantry 2006

- 2nd Lieutenant Imran Ahmed Khan TJ

February 2019

- Sq Leader Hasan Mehmood Siddiqui was awarded Tamgha-e-Jurat - Pakistan and India were involved in a rare aerial engagement which had ignited fears of an all-out conflict. On February 27, PAF shot down two Indian warplanes in Pakistan's airspace and captured Indian pilot Abhinandan Varthaman who was released on March 1 as a "peace gesture".
- Naval units
- Pakistan Navy Submarine Force, contributions to the Indo-Pakistani war of 1965 and 1971.

== Notes and references ==
- Nishan-e-Haider Archived 2017-10-15 at the Wayback Machine, from Pakistan Television Corp (PTV). Television drama on Captain Raja Muhammad Sarwar Shaheed, Rashid Minhas Shaheed, Momin and Major Raja Aziz Bhatti Shaheed
- Edward Haynes webpage on Pakistani awards Archived 2007-01-21 at the Wayback Machine
- GeoCities website on military wards

== See also ==
- Pakistani Armed Forces
- Awards and decorations of the Pakistan military
