= 2005 Kashmir earthquake =

Earthquake in South Asia

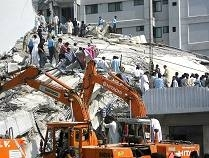
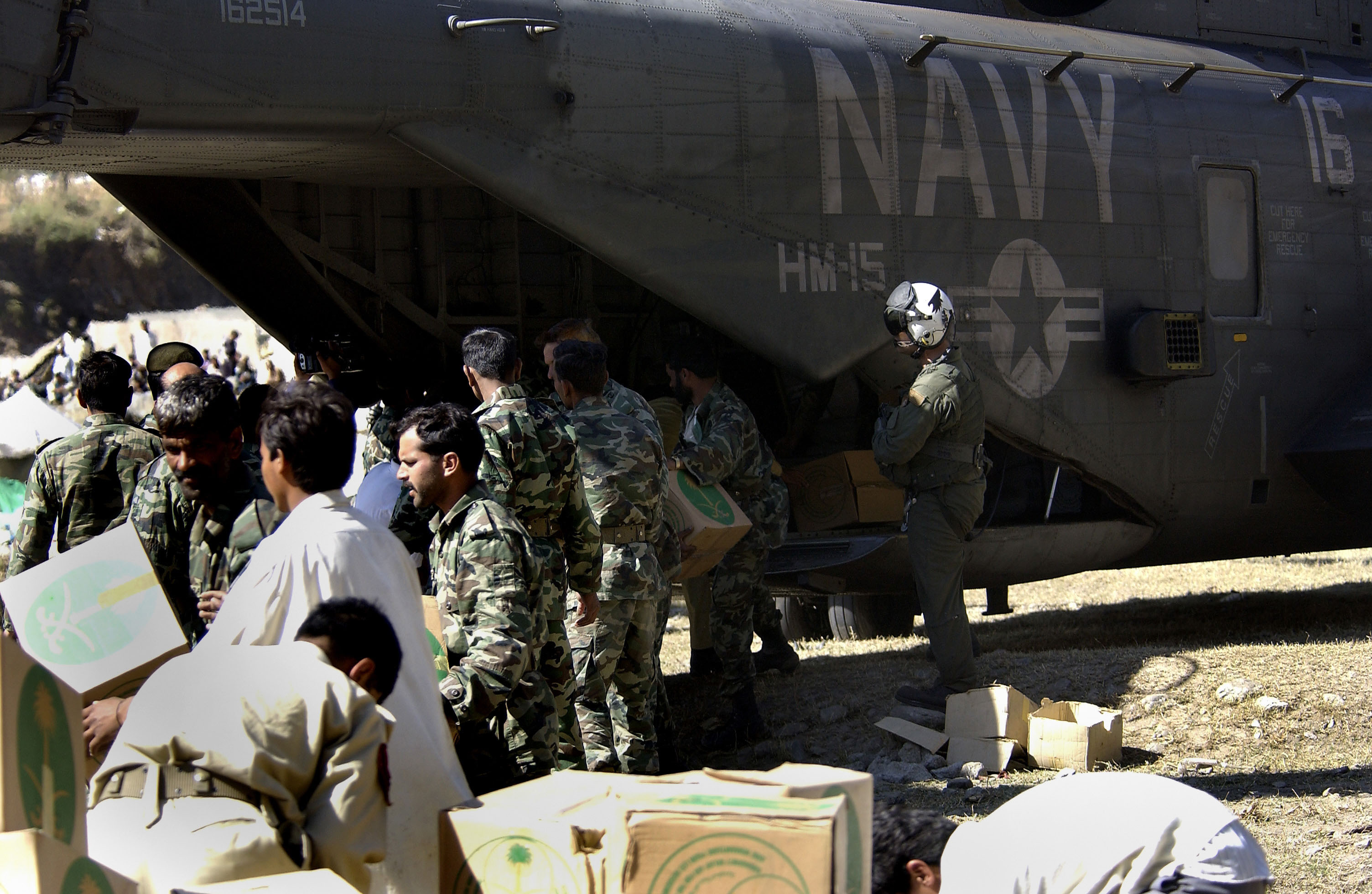
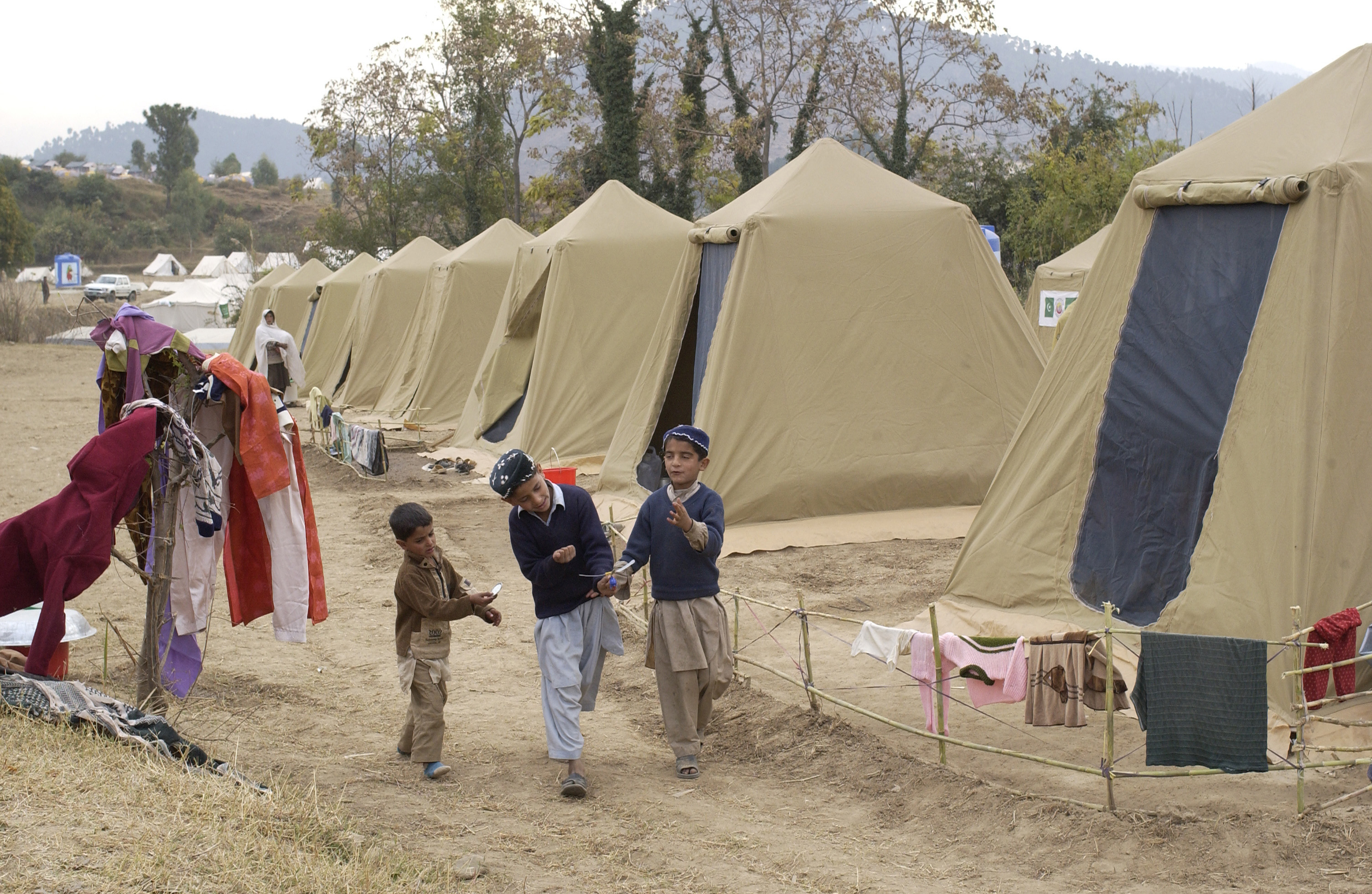
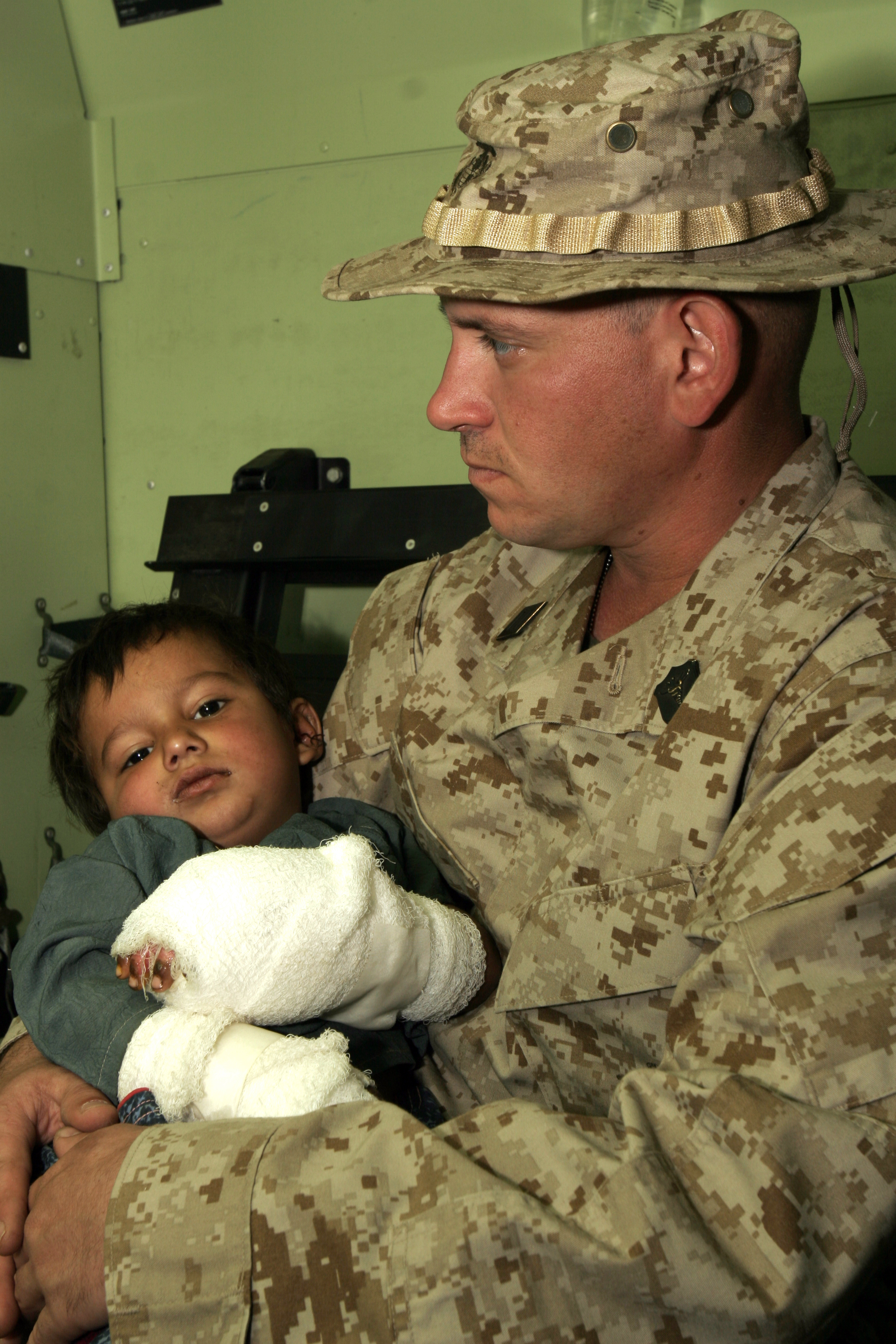
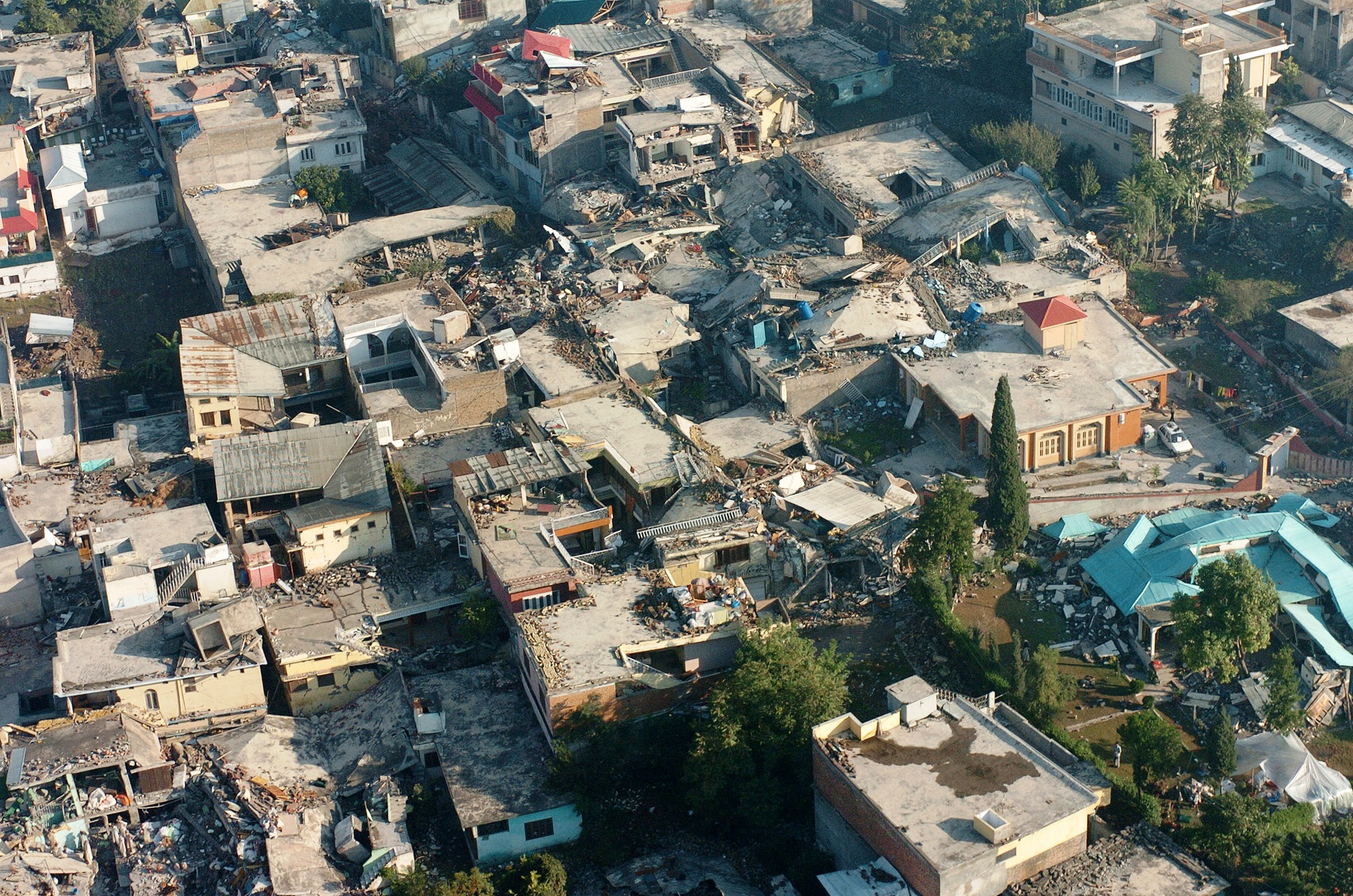
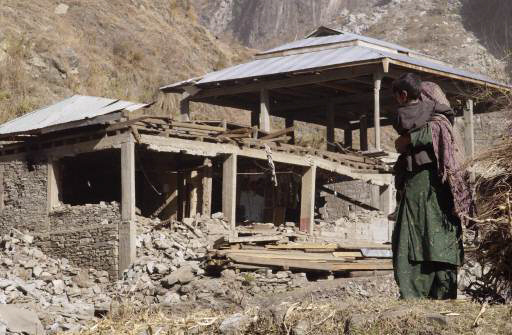
- Clockwise from top left: Rescuers at the collapsed Margalla Towers in Islamabad; Pakistani soldiers unload relief supplies from a U.S. Navy helicopter near Balakot; U.S. Navy Hospitalman holds an injured three-year-old boy in Shinkiari; Destroyed building in Nardjan; Collapsed buildings in Muzaffarabad; A tent village built to house displaced earthquake survivors in Shinkiari

- UTC time: 2005-10-08 03:50:39
- ISC event: 7703077
- USGS-ANSS: ComCat
- Local date: October 8, 2005
- Local time: 08:50:39 PKT (UTC+5)
- Duration: 20 seconds
- Magnitude: M_{w} 7.6
- Depth: 15 km (9.3 mi)
- Epicenter: 34.45°N 73.65°E
- Fault: Main Himalayan Thrust
- Type: Reverse
- Areas affected: Northern Pakistan; Jammu and Kashmir, India; Eastern Afghanistan
- Total damage: US$6.68 billion (equivalent to $11.0 billion in 2025)
- Max. intensity: MMI XI (Extreme)
- Peak acceleration: 0.231 g
- Landslides: Yes
- Aftershocks: 1,778 (as of 31 December 2005); M_{w} 6.4 at 15:46 PKT on 8 October 2005 (strongest)
- Casualties: 88,714 dead, 207,096 injured, thousands missing: 87,350 dead, 200,000 injured, thousands missing (Pakistan); 1,360 dead, 7,082 injured (India); 4 dead, 14 injured (Afghanistan)

On 8 October 2005, at 08:50:39 PKT, a M_{w} 7.6 earthquake struck the Azad Kashmir region in northern Pakistan. Its epicenter was located in the tehsil of Patikka, near the city of Muzaffarabad. It caused catastrophic damage and tens of thousands of fatalities across Azad Kashmir and northwestern Jammu and Kashmir, India.

At least 87,350 people were killed and 200,000 were injured in Pakistan, with an additional 1,360 deaths and 7,082 injuries in India and 4 deaths in eastern Afghanistan. Among the fatalities were 26,000 killed by landslides, 19,000 students and teachers killed by collapsing schools, and 317 Pakistani and Indian military personnel. Muzaffarabad, Balakot, Bagh and Battagram were the worst-affected areas in Pakistan; all 4,000 inhabitants in the destroyed village of Jabri Kailash died. Severe damage also occurred in Kupwara and Baramulla districts in India, with the tehsil of Karnah almost completely destroyed. More than 856,400 buildings and houses were severely damaged or destroyed in Pakistan and India, with buildings collapsing as far away as Lahore. More than 3.5 million people were displaced, resulting in a severe humanitarian crisis for the region.

== Tectonic setting ==
Kashmir lies at the southern margin of the broad zone of continental collision between the Eurasian and Indian plates. The rate of convergence between these plates near this location is 38 mm per year. The main structures involved in accommodating this convergence are large thrust faults, such as the Main Central Thrust and the Main Frontal Thrust. Within the frontal thrust zone, there are many individual thrust faults.

The region where the 2005 earthquake occurred crosses the political borders of Pakistan, India and neighboring countries. The earliest recorded quake occurred in 1255 in Kathmandu, Nepal. The Kashmir valley is completely surrounded by mountains, with the valley floor being 1,850 m (6,070 ft) above sea level, but the encircling mountains reach heights of 3,000–4,000 m (9,800–13,100 ft). Its unique geography makes it particularly prone to natural disasters, including floods, windstorms, avalanches, landslides, fires and droughts. It is, however, particularly prone to earthquakes as it lies on top of active geological faults where two tectonic plates, the large Eurasian and small Indian tectonic plates collide. This collision forces the Indian plate under the Eurasian plate, causing movement of the earth's crust.

== Earthquake ==
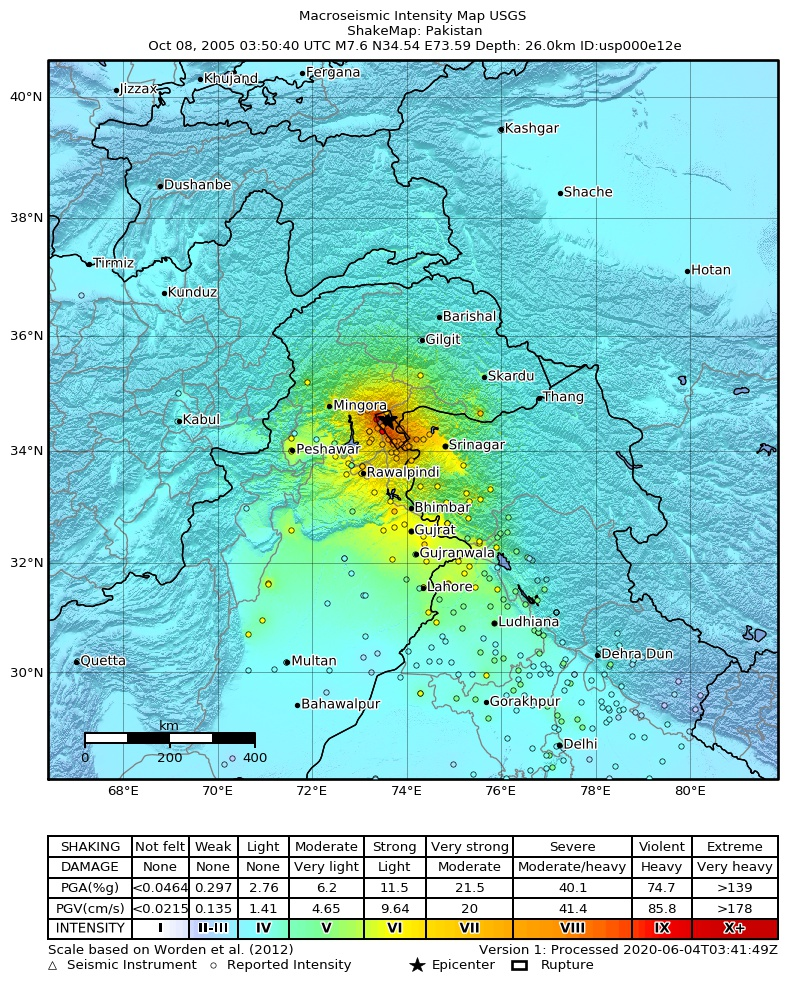
USGS ShakeMap

The United States Geological Survey (USGS) and International Seismological Centre (ISC) both recorded a moment magnitude (M_{w}) of 7.6, and depths of 26 km (16 mi) and 15 km (9.3 mi), respectively. Its epicenter was located 10 km (6.2 mi) east-northeast of the town of Patikka in the Muzaffarabad District. The focal mechanism corresponded to reverse faulting on the Main Himalayan Thrust. A rupture area of 110 km (68 mi) x 40 km (25 mi) was estimated, with a maximum slip of 10.573 m (34.69 ft) north of Muzaffarabad. The observed source time function gives a 20 second duration for the earthquake, with the greatest phase of seismic moment release occurring about 10 seconds after initiation.

The earthquake resulted in a 75 km (47 mi) long surface rupture. It also triggered thousands of landslides, mainly rockfalls, debris falls and a debris avalanche. Landslides buried over 7,500 km^{2} (2,900 sq mi) of land, and caused nearly a third of the fatalities from the earthquake. There were two significant landslides, one in Chella Bandi, Muzaffarabad, and another in the Pir Panjal Range. The latter is considered the largest earthquake-triggered landslide and formed a new lake. The course of the Neelum River was altered by the landslides and the surface rupture. A waterfall also formed at the edge of the Kunhar River valley. It was observed that new co-seismic escarpments formed where sharp topographic changes existed. There are conflicting studies about the soil liquefaction aspects. This phenomenon and sand-blows were reported in the northwestern Kashmir Valley. However, one study did not observe any liquefaction.

The earthquake had a maximum Modified Mercalli intensity of XI (Extreme) evaluated in an area around the epicentre, between the towns of Muzaffarabad and Balakot. It was also assigned XI on the Environmental Seismic Intensity scale. Field surveys of heavy damage to buildings and other structures in Balakot determined that the Modified Mercalli intensity exceeded X (Extreme). At Muzaffarabad, the intensity peaked at IX–X (Violent–Extreme). Intensity VII–VIII (Very strong–Severe) was determined in the areas south of Muzaffarabad. A maximum peak ground acceleration (pga) of 0.231 g was recorded at Abbottabad.

The maximum intensity in India was MMI X in the towns of Uri and Karnah, and MMI IX in Kupwara and Handwara. Areas of eastern Afghanistan felt MMI IV–V (Light–Moderate). The earthquake was also felt throughout central Asia, and as far away as Dushanbe, Tajikistan and Almaty, Kazakhstan.

By the end of 2005, a total of 1,778 aftershocks were recorded. By the end of 2006, 357 aftershocks of M_{w} 4.0 or higher were recorded by the USGS; the largest aftershock measured M_{w} 6.4, striking at 15:46 PKT on 8 October with an epicenter northwest of the mainshock.

== Impact ==
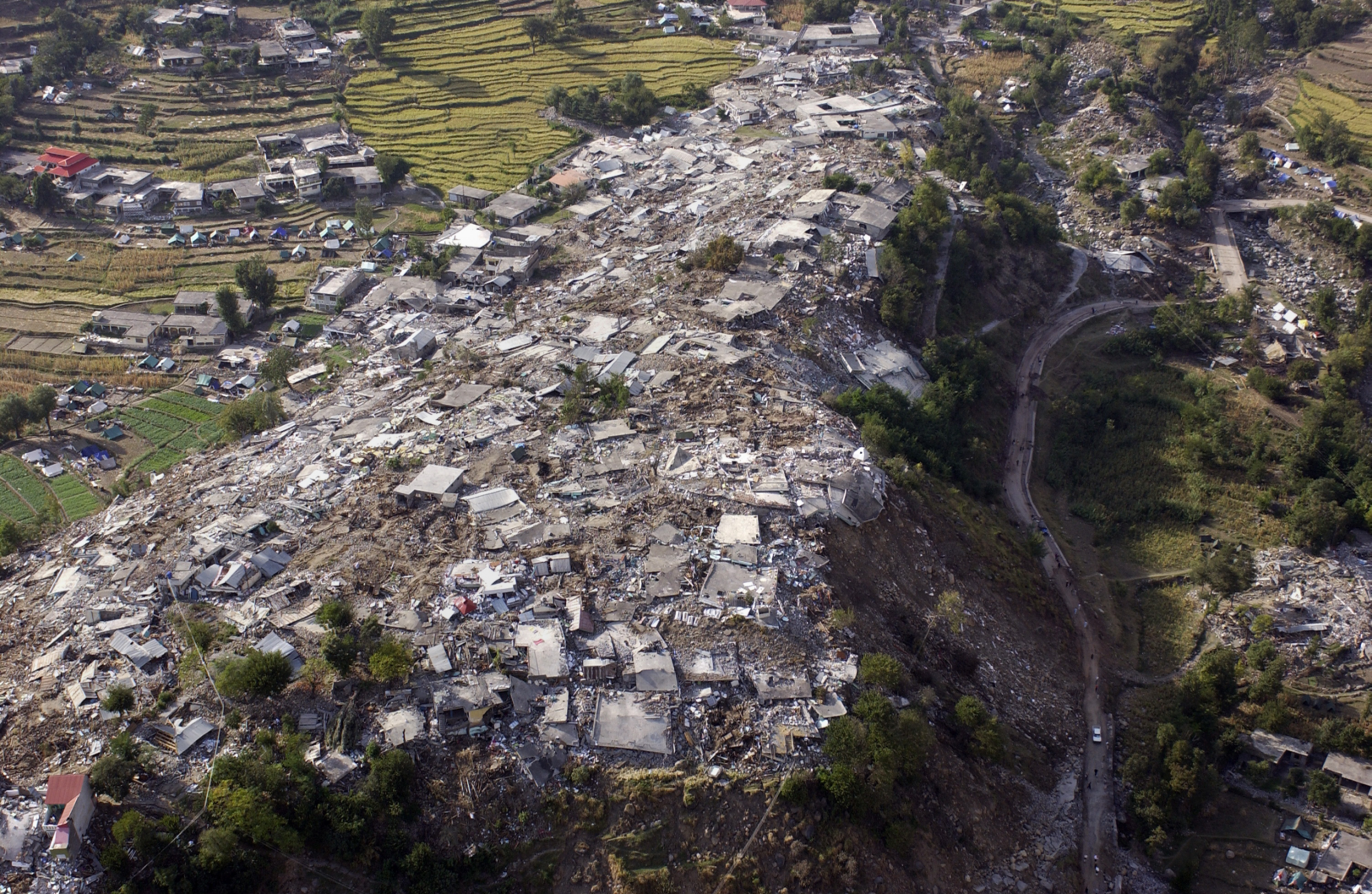
The ruins of Balakot, nine days after the earthquake

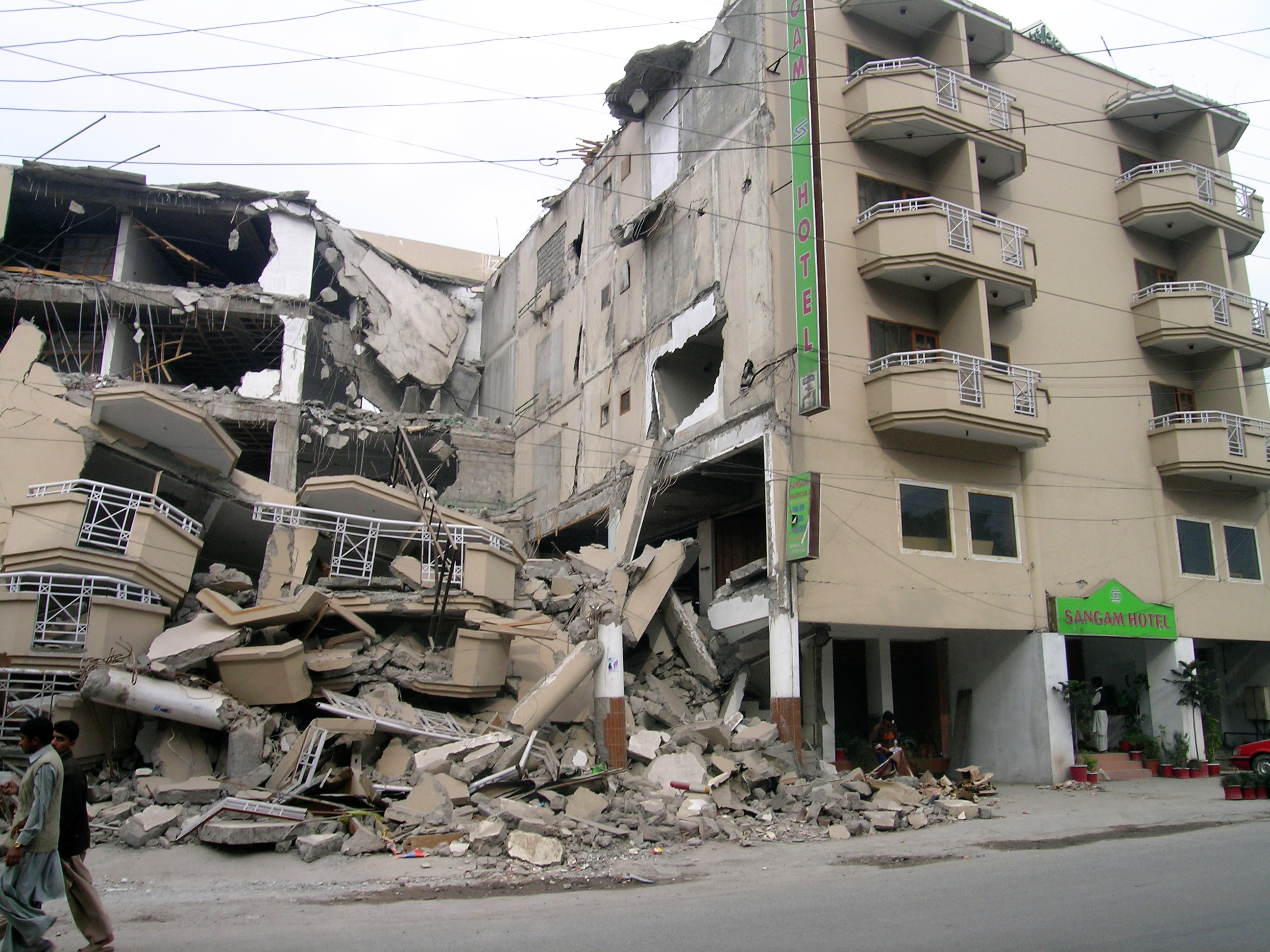
A collapsed building in Muzaffarabad

=== Pakistan ===
The Pakistani government's official death toll as of November 2005 stood at 87,350, although some initial estimates put the toll at over 100,000. Approximately 200,000 people were injured, and over 3.5 million were displaced. As of January 2010, thousands of people were still unaccounted for. The earthquake affected more than 500,000 families, and cold weather killed many who survived the earthquake.

By district, there were 33,724 deaths in Muzaffarabad, 24,511 in Mansehra, 8,157 in Bagh, 3,232 in Battagram, 1,025 in Poonch, 661 in Kohistan, 515 in Abbottabad, 447 in Neelum, 423 in Shangla, 6 in Mirpur and 4 in Sudhanoti. Additionally a school collapse in Rawalpindi killed one student and injured six. More than 780,000 buildings were severely damaged or destroyed in Pakistan, including 17,000 schools. About 80% of these were located in rural areas, including 50% of structures within the rupture zone. Overall economic losses from the earthquake amounted to US$6.68 billion.

Because the earthquake occurred during a school day in the region, most students were at school when the earthquake struck. In total, approximately 19,000 victims in Pakistan were students who died when their schools collapsed. Landslides were also responsible for 26,000 deaths, making it the fourth-deadliest landsliding event ever recorded, and the deadliest since the Vargas landslides in 1999. Many were also trapped in their homes, and because the earthquake occurred during Ramadan, most people were taking naps after their pre-dawn meal and had little time to escape. Women made up a larger portion of casualties as many were inside cleaning after the morning meal. At least 215 Pakistani soldiers also died.

In Balakot, about 90% of the buildings were reduced to rubble, and 30,000 people were feared dead, while in the city of Muzaffarabad, 23,000 people were killed and almost every building was either destroyed or damaged. The village of Jabri Kailash, near the epicenter, was completely destroyed, with its entire population of 4,000 believed to have been wiped out. In Garhi Habibullah, 2,000 people were killed, including 403 students after a school collapsed. Up to 1,000 people were killed after a landslide struck the town of Hattian Bala.

Around 574 health facilities were reported to have been partially damaged or destroyed. In Pakistan, around 320 health institutions were destroyed and 44 were partially damaged. The resulting landslides from the earthquake affected transport, with closure of essential roads and highways. Sections of a road and pavement in a major route in Muzaffarabad collapsed. Many bridges were damaged, with the largest damaged bridge in Balakot. Several other bridges in the Jhelum Valley (Kashmir) were also damaged. The bridges in Muzaffarabad were not damaged except for a pedestrian suspension bridge north of the city which collapsed. 3,994 water supply systems were destroyed. In Muzaffarabad and Balakot, the electricity network was destroyed. In Balakot, some pylons were tilted. The GSM network withstood the impact of the earthquake better. In both towns, the Mobilink operator was functional, but was saturated and experienced intermittent signal, and was therefore unreliable. In contrast, landline telephone infrastructure was completely destroyed. It was estimated that about 40% of telecommunication exchanges, and 15% of telephone lines in Azad Jammu and Kashmir were disrupted. In the North-West Frontier Province, it was estimated that 30% of exchanges and 8% of lines were disrupted.

In Islamabad, one building collapsed; a 12-story apartment building at the Margalla Towers complex. The collapse trapped nearly 200 people, with 78 dying and 107 others rescued, including 100 with serious injuries. Damage elsewhere in the city was rather minor, with 117 buildings sustaining structural cracks. Buildings also collapsed in Gujranwala, Gujrat and Lahore.

=== India and Afghanistan ===
At least 1,360 fatalities were confirmed in Jammu and Kashmir, India. At least 102 military personnel were among the dead, with 322 more injured and 32 missing. In addition, 7,082 were injured, 9,836 homes were destroyed and 34,245 were severely damaged. In addition, 32,335 buildings collapsed in Anantnag, Baramulla, Jammu and Srinagar. In Karnah, nearly every single house collapsed, with almost every resident displaced and 514 people killed in the tehsil. At least 250 people were killed in Kupwara, while in Uri there were over 300 deaths, including 54 soldiers killed by a collapsing border post and 54 labourers struck by rockfalls, half of the buildings were damaged or destroyed and fires caused severe damage. An additional 32 fatalities were reported in Tangdhar. In Jammu division, 17 people died, 148 were injured and 914 houses were damaged or destroyed. The 200-year-old Moti Mahal fort in Poonch District collapsed. Buildings were also damaged in Delhi, while panic caused by the shaking was reported as far away as Gujarat.

Four deaths and 14 injuries were reported in Afghanistan, including a young girl who died in Jalalabad after a wall collapsed on her, while minor damage occurred in Kabul.

== Response ==
=== Domestic ===
Immediately after the earthquake, local residents and organizations responded to emergency needs. The government and local non-governmental organizations (NGOs) coordinated relief efforts, distributing food, water and medical supplies. Many individuals and communities provided assistance spontaneously. People opened their homes to those displaced. In the initial phases of response, the Pakistan Medical corps, Corps of Engineers, Army Aviation and many infantry units were heavily involved. Helicopters conducted aerial reconnaissance and delivered essential supplies to remote areas while infantry units engaged in search and rescue operations.

The collective action of local residents, government agencies, and NGOs was instrumental in providing immediate relief and setting the stage for long-term recovery and reconstruction. Medical rehabilitation services swiftly intervened, providing assistive devices and customized prosthetics to facilitate the early recovery of injured individuals' functional abilities and psychological states. The MST Military Hospital, equipped with 12 beds and a team of experienced specialists, provided urgent medical and surgical care for post-disaster casualties. This rapid response accelerated the rehabilitation process, ensuring that victims received timely and professional medical support even under extreme conditions.

=== International ===
Well over US$6.2 billion (400 billion Pakistani rupees) in aid arrived from all around the world. US Marine and Army helicopters stationed in neighbouring Afghanistan quickly flew aid into the devastated region along with five CH-47 Chinook helicopters from the Royal Air Force that were deployed from the United Kingdom. Five crossing points were opened on the Line of Control (LOC), between India and Pakistan, to facilitate the flow of humanitarian and medical aid to the affected region, and aid teams from different parts of Pakistan and around the world came to the region to assist in relief efforts. Afghan National Army helicopters also brought supplies and medical personnel.

The United Nations Development Programme coordinated responses, rebuilt shelters, schools and health facilities. The United Nations Population Fund deployed nine mobile medical units, provided reproductive health services for one million people and focused on pregnant women and children. The UNICEF distributed school kits for 140,000 children, established 70 child-friendly spaces and reopened 487 schools. The World Food Programme provided emergency food, including high-energy biscuits. The World Health Organization delivered medical equipment, health kits and set up a disease early warning system. The United Nations High Commissioner for Refugees managed 37 camps, distributing tents, blankets and supplies. The International Organization for Migration helped 14,000 families return home, providing transport and food. The OCHA initiated rescue operations, launched a $550 million fundraising appeal and conducted environmental assessments. The United Nations Humanitarian Air Service delivered 28,000 tons of relief supplies to remote areas using helicopters.

The International Rescue Committee (IRC) responded swiftly, providing emergency food, medical care, and shelter. They treated thousands of survivors in makeshift clinics, ensured access to clean water and sanitation, and established child-friendly spaces to aid psychological recovery. Before winter, the IRC distributed warm clothing and bedding and assisted in rebuilding homes and infrastructure, supporting long-term recovery efforts.

The World Bank, with the Asian Development Bank, estimated reconstruction costs at $3.5 billion, providing financial and technical support for infrastructure, particularly in housing, education, and health, while promoting transparency and disaster risk reduction. The International Monetary Fund helped stabilize Pakistan's economy by offering financial aid to manage fiscal pressures from emergency relief and reconstruction, ensuring economic stability and the efficient management of international aid.

Countries worldwide responded quickly with financial and logistical aid. For instance, Saudi Arabia contributed a $133 million aid package, including emergency supplies and medical teams, and institutionalized its support through SPAPEV. China provided $6.2 million in aid, deployed a 49-member rescue team with sniffer dogs, and sent US$1 million in cash and the first batch of rescue materials for immediate relief. Turkey delivered $150 million in aid, sent 30 aircraft with medical teams and relief goods, and built tent cities for 70,000 people. Cuba dispatched 2,260 health professionals, set up 32 field hospitals, supplied 234.5 tons of medicines, and offered 1,000 free medical scholarships to Pakistani students from rural areas.

Numerous NGOs, including Médecins Sans Frontières, Save the Children and Oxfam provided medical care, clean drinking water and temporary housing. They were crucial in addressing the psychological and social needs of affected communities, especially for vulnerable groups like children and the elderly. The Gift of the Givers Foundation, for example, concentrated on delivering food, water, and medical supplies to remote areas that were difficult to access.

Despite substantial aid, logistical difficulties hindered efficient relief efforts. Limited infrastructure, combined with harsh weather and mountainous terrain, delayed the transport of supplies to remote areas. Additionally, coordination challenges among different organizations sometimes led to resource duplication and gaps in critical areas.

== Aftermath ==
At least 100,000 of the injured suffered fractures, crush injuries and/or lacerations. Healthcare facilities were inundated, and makeshift field hospitals were quickly established. However, the lack of adequate facilities, supplies and skilled personnel significantly hampered medical response efforts. Temporary shelters and overcrowded camps coupled with inadequate access to clean water, sanitation, and hygiene facilities, led to outbreaks of respiratory infections, diarrheal diseases and measles. Respiratory infections were notably prevalent, exacerbated by the cold weather in the region, and poor insulation in camps.

The earthquake caused significant psychological trauma for survivors who endured the sudden loss of family members, homes and livelihoods. This experience triggered acute stress reactions in many individuals, including anxiety, depression and later, post-traumatic stress disorder (PTSD). The lack of mental health infrastructure in the affected areas compounded these problems as there were few resources available for trauma counselling or psychological support. Mental health clinics set up by non-governmental organisations provided some relief, but the support was often short lived to limited funding and resources.

In terms of non-communicable diseases, increased rates of hypertension, diabetes and cardiovascular disease were observed as access to routine health care services became severely disrupted. This disruption meant that individuals with chronic illnesses struggled to obtain necessary medications and medical care, leading to poor disease management and subsequent health complications. Long term mental health impact was also significant. Research conducted years after the earthquake found that many survivors were still experiencing symptoms of PTSD, depression, anxiety disorders. These persistent psychological effects highlight the limited access to mental health resources in the affected regions and the cultural barriers preventing individuals from seeking mental health support.

The severity of injuries varied across regions, with mountainous and remote areas particularly affected. The geographical isolation of these regions made it challenging for rescue teams to provide timely assistance, leading to higher mortality rates in these hard-to-reach areas. Their rugged terrain and damaged infrastructure delayed the transport of critically injured patients to hospitals, increasing fatalities among the injured

Lower income populations faced greater hardship due to inadequate housing which was more vulnerable to collapse during the earthquake. These individuals also lacked financial means to rebuild their homes and lives post disaster, prolonging their exposure to hazardous living conditions and increasing their risk of health complications.

Women, especially those who were pregnant or had caregiving responsibilities faced additional health challenges due to their limited mobility and high risk of injury during the earthquake. In the aftermath, women often struggled with mental health issues including depression and anxiety as they assumed the burden of caring for the injured family members while dealing with their own trauma and additional occurrence of domestic violence. Children were at a heightened risk of developing psychological issues, including PTSD due to the traumatic experience of witnessing death and destruction.

In the Kamsar area, north of Muzaffarabad, in January 2010, a Chinese road-building firm dug up a van containing 17 decomposed corpses which went missing during the earthquake.

== See also ==
- 2019 Kashmir earthquake
- Disaster Management Act, 2005
- List of earthquakes in 2005
- List of earthquakes in Afghanistan
- List of earthquakes in India
- List of earthquakes in Pakistan
- Meena – "Life Smiled Again"
- October 2015 Hindu Kush earthquake
- Tamgha-e-Eisaar
- Sitara-e-Eisaar
