= Sitara-e-Eisaar =

Award of Pakistan Armed Forces

- Type: Commemorative Medal
- Awarded for: Showing outstanding humanitarian services in the wake of the devastating 2005 earthquake in Pakistan
- Sponsored by: Government of Pakistan
- Post-nominals: SER
- Status: Currently not being awarded
- Established: in 2006 by Government of Pakistan
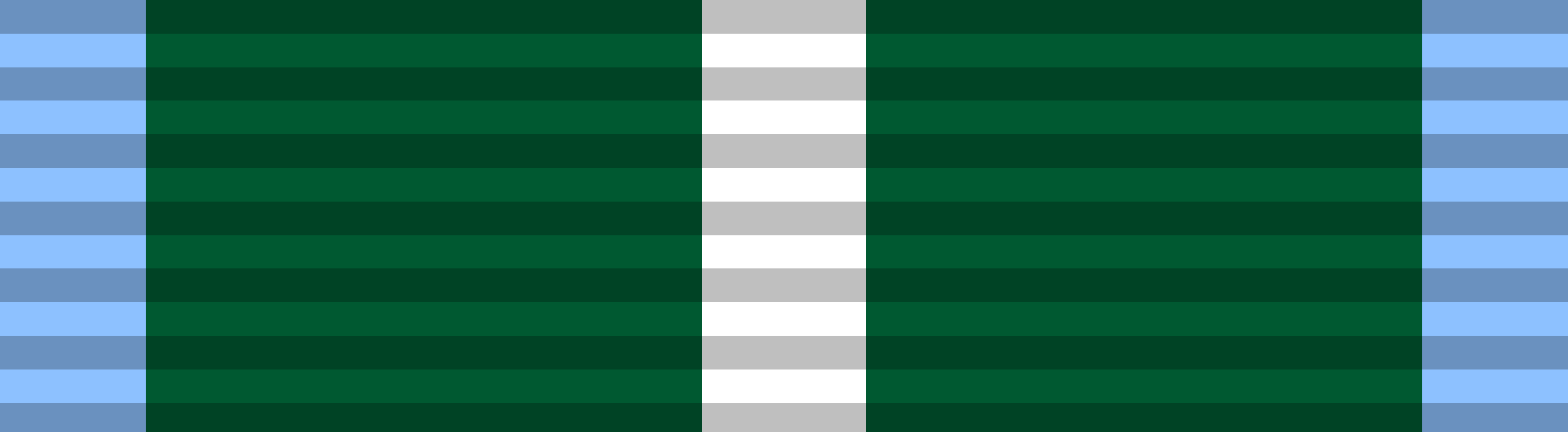
- Ribbon Bar of Sitara-e-Eisaar

Precedence
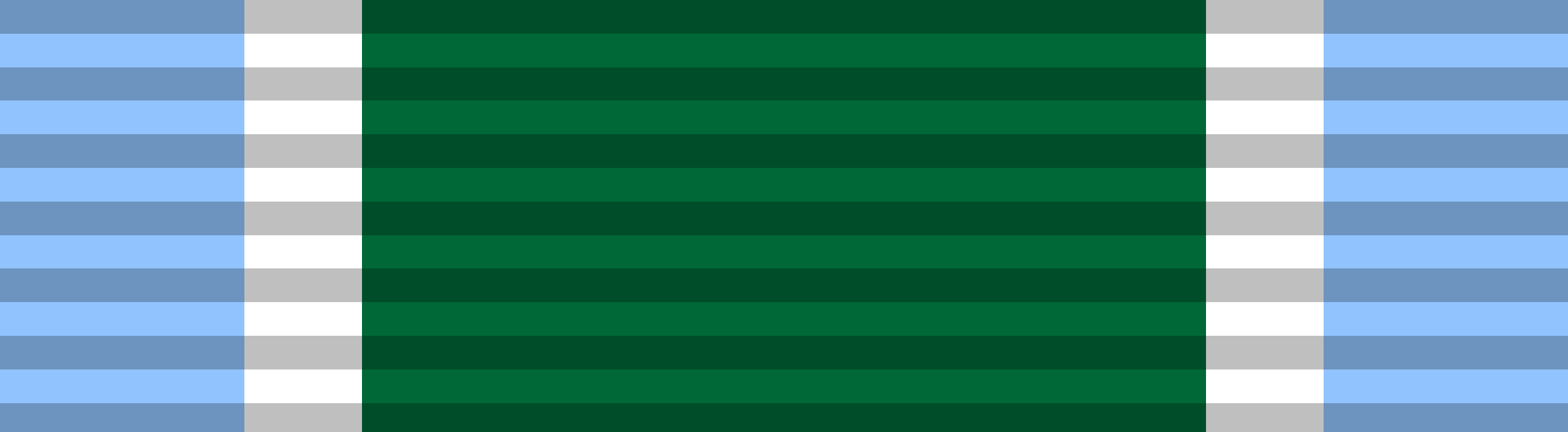
- Next (lower): Tamgha-e-Eisaar

Sitara-e-Eisaar (lit. Star of Sacrifice) is a commemorative medal which is awarded for outstanding humanitarian services in the wake of the devastating 2005 earthquake in Pakistan. It was awarded by the then President Pervez Musharraf.
