= Tamgha-e-Istaqlal =

Award of the Pakistan Armed Forces

Tamgha-i-Istaqlal تمغہِ استقلال
- Obverse of Tamgha-e-Istaqlal Medal
- Type: Medal
- Awarded for: "... Escalation versus India Medal"
- Presented by: Government of Pakistan
- Status: Currently not being awarded
- Established: On 2002

Tamgha-i-Istaqlal (Urdu: تمغہِ استقلال, lit. 'Medal of Good performance') is a medal of the Pakistan Armed Forces, awarded to all the military servicemen on duty during the 2001-2002 Standoff with India.

== See also ==
- Awards and decorations of the Pakistan Armed Forces
