= Tamgha-e-Eisaar =

Award of Pakistan Armed Forces

- Type: Commemorative Medal
- Awarded for: Showing outstanding humanitarian services in the wake of the devastating 2005 earthquake in Pakistan
- Sponsored by: Government of Pakistan
- Post-nominals: TER
- Status: Currently not being awarded
- Established: in 2006 by Government of Pakistan
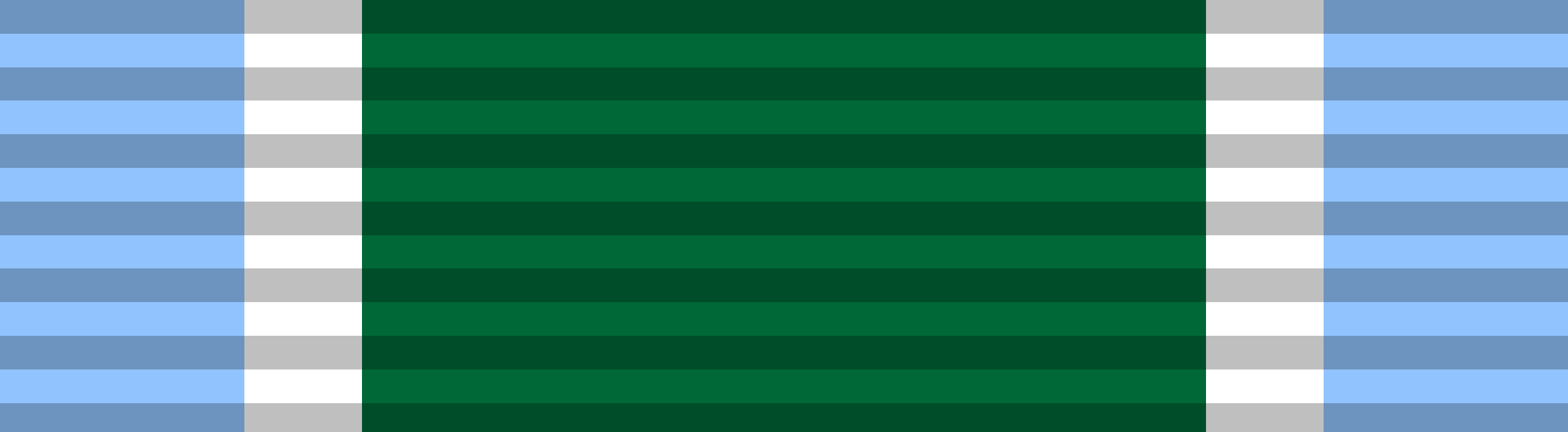
- Ribbon Bar of Tamgha-e-Eisaar

Precedence
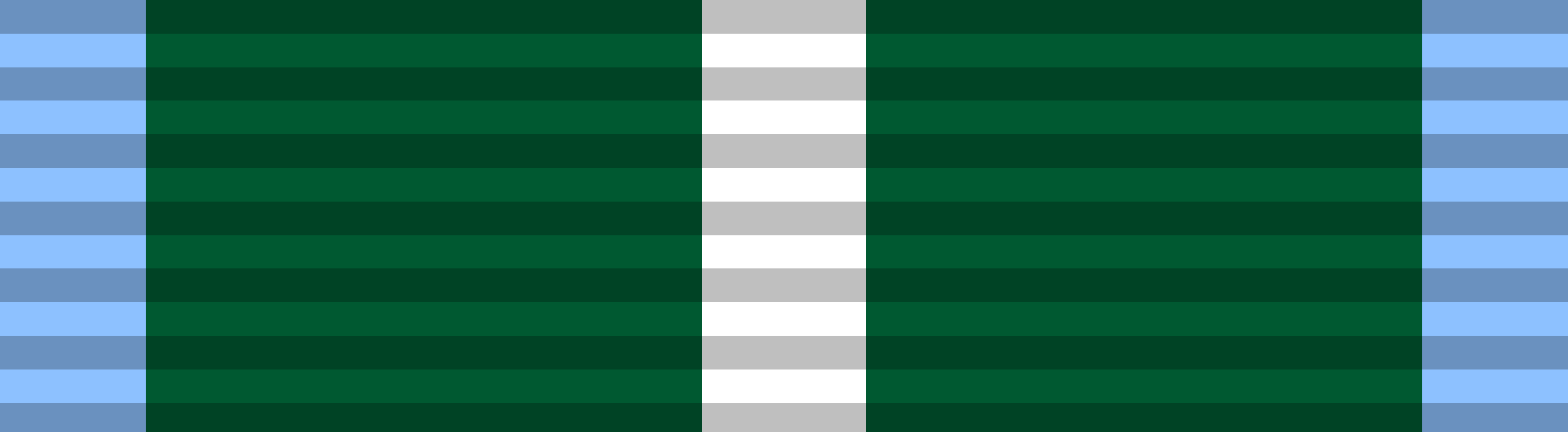
- Next (higher): Sitara-e-Eisaar

Tamgha-e-Eisaar (lit. 'Medal of Sacrifice') is a commemorative medal which is awarded for giving humanitarian services in the wake of the devastating 2005 earthquake in Pakistan. It was awarded by the then President Pervez Musharraf.
