= Patikka =

Tehsil (Town) in Muzaffarabad, Azad Kashmir, Pakistan

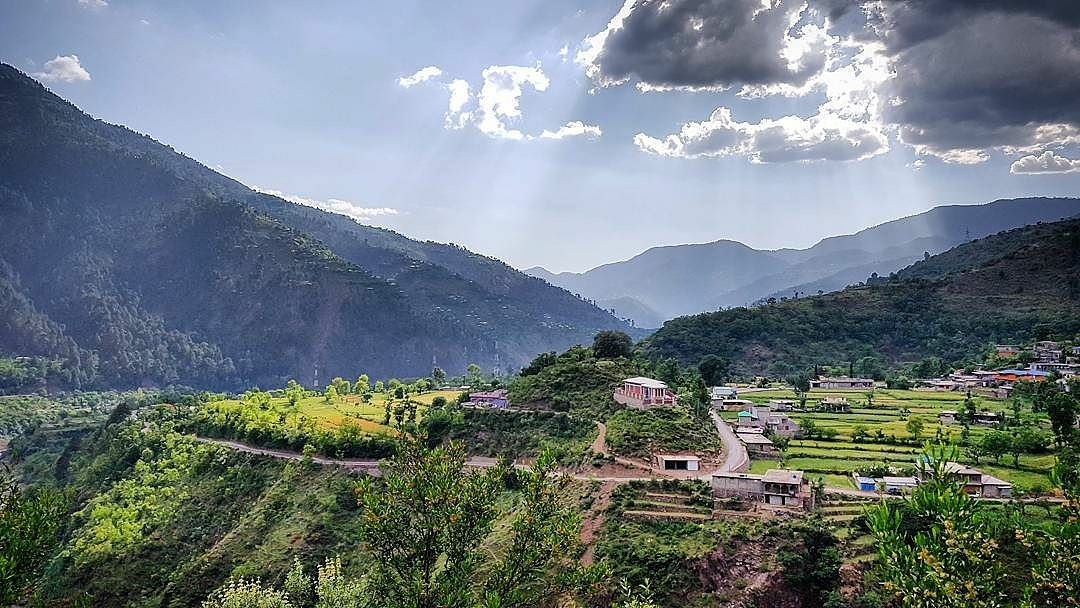
- Interactive map of Patikka
- Coordinates: 34°27′09″N 73°33′01″E
- Country: Pakistan
- Territory: Azad Kashmir

Patikka is a town in the district of Muzaffarabad, in Pakistan-administered Azad Kashmir.
