= Old Christian Cemetery, Peshawar =

British cemetery in Khyber Pakhtunkhwa, Pakistan

- گورا قبرستان
- Interactive map of Old Christian Cemetery, Peshawar

Details
- Established: 1851
- Location: Tehkal Bala, Peshawar, Khyber Pakhtunkhwa, Pakistan
- Coordinates: 34.0078°N 71.5297°E
- Type: Anglican cemetery
- Owned by: Diocese of Peshawar, Church of Pakistan

The Old Christian Cemetery, also known as Tehkal Cemetery, Gora Qabristan, or White people's cemetery, is a cemetery situated in Peshawar, Khyber Pakhtunkhwa, Pakistan. It dates from Victoria era times.

== History ==
The Tehkal Cemetery, established in 1851, is at the Khyber Pass entrance. The cemetery, shaded by historic peepal, sheesham, and palm trees, contains marble crosses and diverse headstones that trace the city's history, notably highlighting British influence and losses in the region. It's also distinguished by a backdrop of the Khyber Hills and has evolved into a tourist destination, recognized in various travel guides.

The cemetery reflects a diverse demographic that has contributed to the region's history, including British soldiers, civil administrators, and their families, along with businessmen, health professionals, and clergy.

It is a repository of historical records pertaining to the Anglo-Afghan conflict. This is evidenced through the various tombstones of British men, women, and children who attempted to extend British control into Kabul.

A significant tombstone belongs to Robert Warburton, a member of the Bengal Artillery, who was captured during the Afghan campaign and held at the Ghilzai Fort. During this period, he formed a relationship with Shahjehan Begum, the divorced niece of the Amir of Afghanistan. The couple later married and had two sons, including Robert Warburton.

== Folklore ==
Despite its historical richness, the cemetery is often associated with an apocryphal tale of a humorous epitaph ascribed to a "Captain Ernest Bloomfield," supposedly killed by his orderly in 1879. This tale, although frequently refuted by experts, has been perpetuated for over a century.

In reality, such incident happened with Isidore Loewenthal, a missionary mistakenly shot by his watchman. His tombstone bears no humorous message, instead, it commemorates his contributions, such as translating the New Testament into Pushto. As this fable persists, the true histories and contributions of individuals interred here, like Loewenthal, risk being overshadowed by this mythical story.
