= Tamgha-e-Azm =

Military award of Pakistan

Tamgha-i-Azm تمغہ عزم
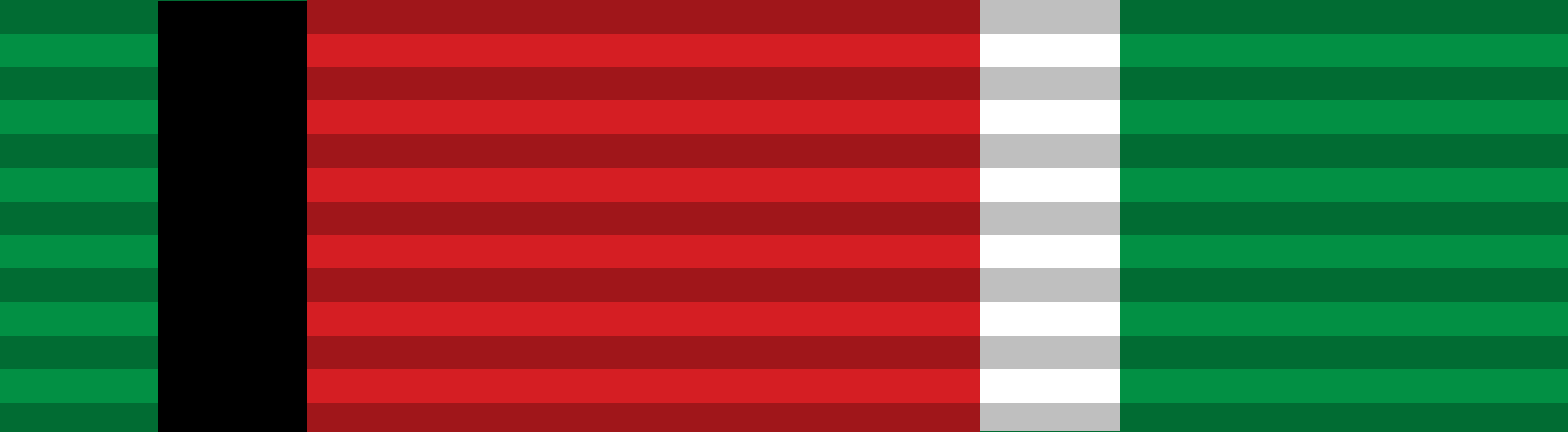
- Ribbon of Tamgha-e-Azm
- Type: Medal
- Awarded for: Display of resolve and steadfastness against militancy and terrorism
- Presented by: President of Pakistan
- Eligibility: Members of the Armed Forces, Civil Armed Forces, and Law Enforcement Agencies
- Status: Currently awarded
- Established: 23 March 2018

Tamgha-e-Azm (Urdu: تمغہِ عزم, lit. 'Military Service Medal') is a military award of Pakistan that recognizes exceptional bravery and sacrifice displayed by personnel of the Armed Forces, the Civil Armed Forces, and the law enforcement agencies of the country against militancy and terrorism.

The medal was recommended by the Ministry of Defence in 2018.

== Established ==
On the event of the Pakistan Day Parade, 23 March 2018 at Islamabad, the President of Pakistan announced the new medal "Tamgha-e-Azm" for all Armed Forces and law enforcement agencies' personnel who have participated in the war against terrorism.

== Eligibility ==
The Decoration is awarded to the members of the three armed forces, civil armed forces, Janbaz, Mujahid, National Guards, Maritime Security Agency, and Police, who are or have been on the active strength thereof on and from December 11, 2001 uptill 23 March 2018.

== See also ==
- Awards and decorations of the Pakistan Armed Forces
