= Imtiazi Sanad =

Fifth-highest military award of Pakistan

- امتیازی سناد
- Presented by: Government of Pakistan
- Eligibility: Pakistan Armed Forces
- Post-nominals: I.S.
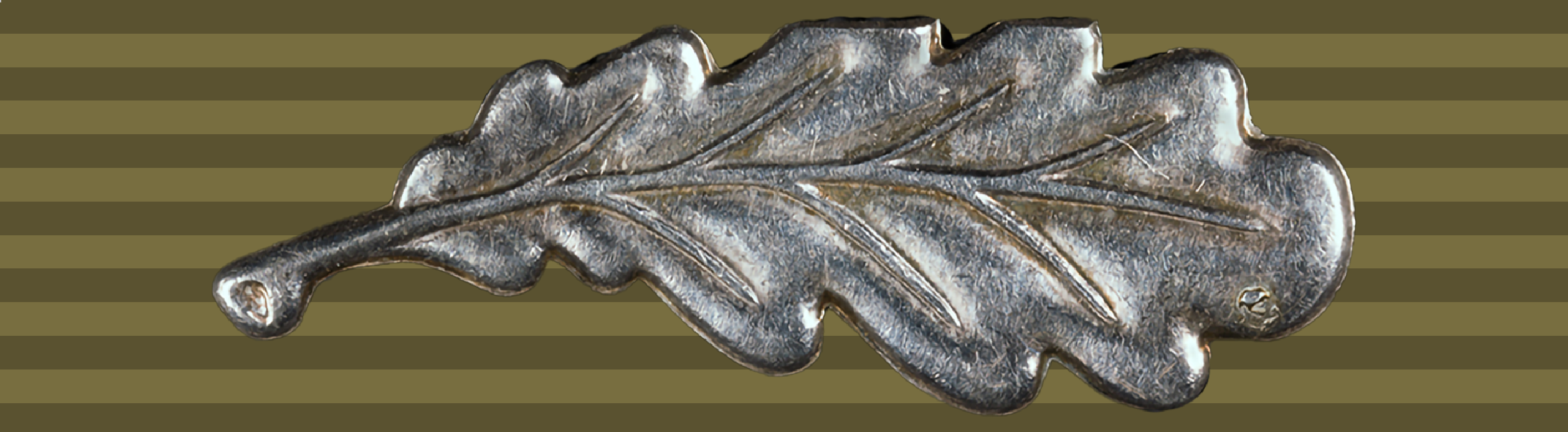
- Ribbon

Precedence
- Next (higher): Tamgha-e-Jurat

The Imtiazi Sanad (Note: Urdu:امتیازی سناد) is the fifth-highest Pakistani military award for gallantry or distinguished service in combat. It can be conferred upon any member of the Pakistani Armed Forces or Civil Armed Forces who is mentioned in the dispatches of a senior commander for actions that do not warrant a higher gallantry award. It may be considered equivalent of the Mentioned in Despatches in the Commonwealth honours system and the Bronze Star in the United States honours system. The next highest award in the Pakistani honours systems is the Tamgha-i-Jurat.

== Description ==
According to the Pakistan Army regulations of 1959, the Imtiazi Sanad: "will be signifed by a bronze OAK leaf emblem to be worn on the ribbon of the campaign star/medal pertaining to the operation for which the individual has been mentioned in dispatches and thereby becomes eligible for the "Imtiazi Sanad". If a campaign star/medal has not been granted, the emblem is to be worn directly on the coat after any medal ribbons. If there are no medal ribbons the emblem is to be worn in the position in which a single ribbon would be worn."

== See also ==
- Awards and decorations of the Pakistan military
