= 1935 =

1935 in various calendars
- Gregorian calendar: 1935; MCMXXXV
- Ab urbe condita: 2688
- Armenian calendar: 1384; ԹՎ ՌՅՁԴ
- Assyrian calendar: 6685
- Baháʼí calendar: 91–92
- Balinese saka calendar: 1856–1857
- Bengali calendar: 1341–1342
- Berber calendar: 2885
- British Regnal year: 25 Geo. 5 – 26 Geo. 5
- Buddhist calendar: 2479
- Burmese calendar: 1297
- Byzantine calendar: 7443–7444
- Chinese calendar: 甲戌年 (Wood Dog); 4632 or 4425 — to — 乙亥年 (Wood Pig); 4633 or 4426
- Coptic calendar: 1651–1652
- Discordian calendar: 3101
- Ethiopian calendar: 1927–1928
- Hebrew calendar: 5695–5696
- Hindu calendars
- Vikram Samvat: 1991–1992
- Shaka Samvat: 1856–1857
- Kali Yuga: 5035–5036
- Holocene calendar: 11935
- Igbo calendar: 935–936
- Iranian calendar: 1313–1314
- Islamic calendar: 1353–1354
- Japanese calendar: Shōwa 10 (昭和１０年)
- Javanese calendar: 1865–1866
- Juche calendar: 24
- Julian calendar: Gregorian minus 13 days
- Korean calendar: 4268
- Minguo calendar: ROC 24 民國24年
- Nanakshahi calendar: 467
- Thai solar calendar: 2477–2478
- Tibetan calendar: ཤིང་ཕོ་ཁྱི་ལོ་ (male Wood-Dog); 2061 or 1680 or 908 — to — ཤིང་མོ་ཕག་ལོ་ (female Wood-Boar); 2062 or 1681 or 909

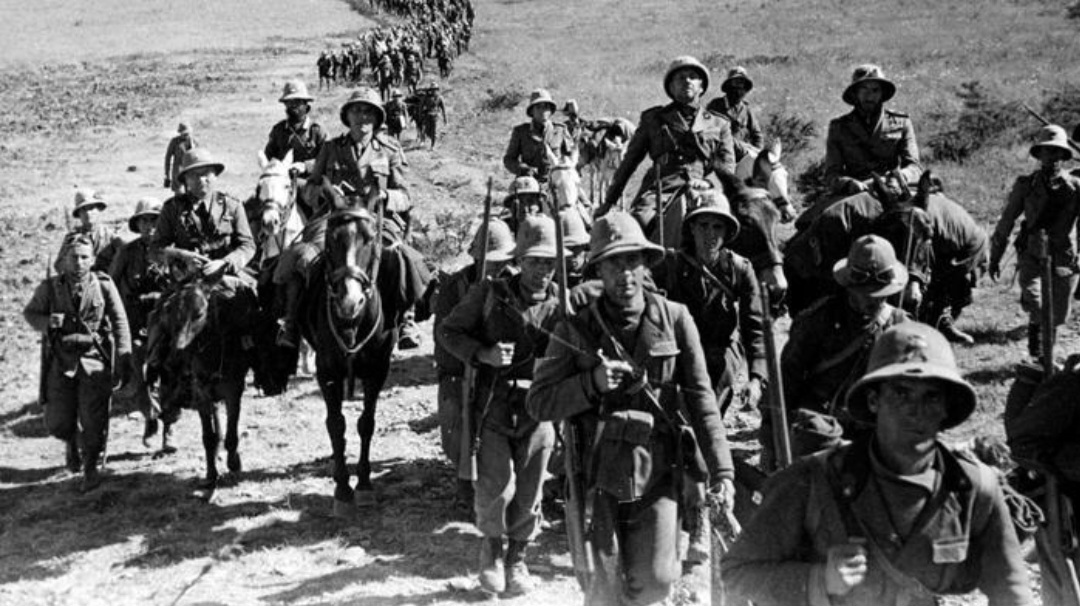
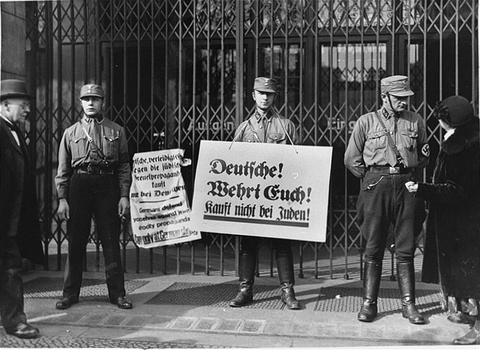
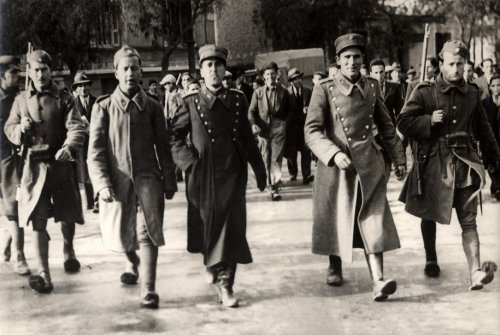
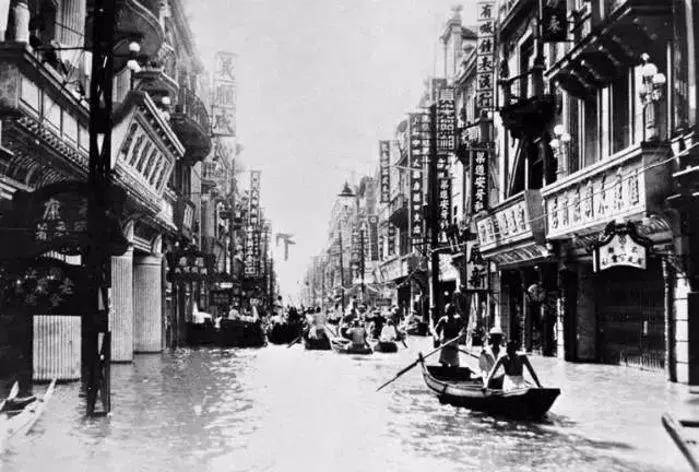
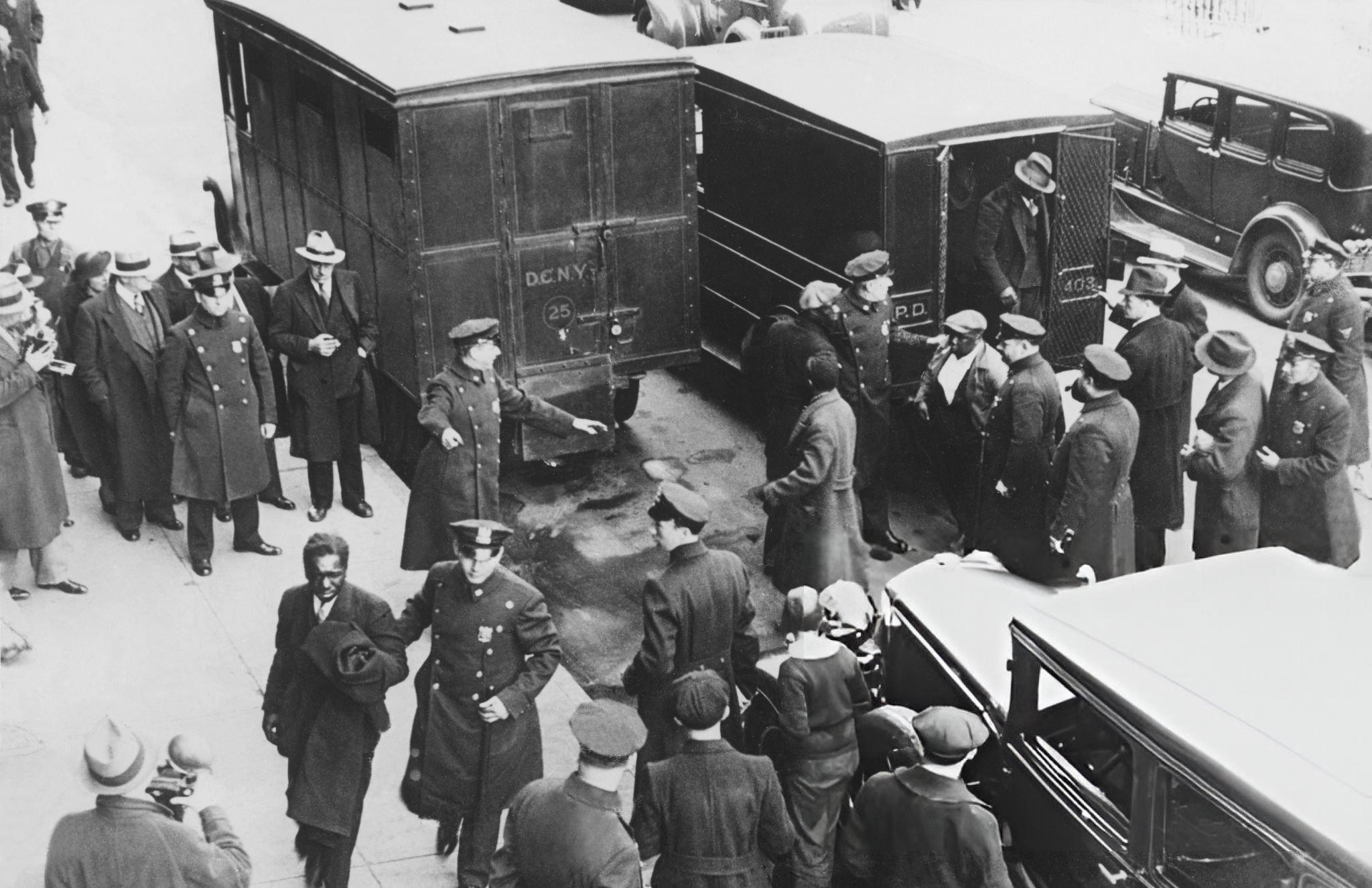
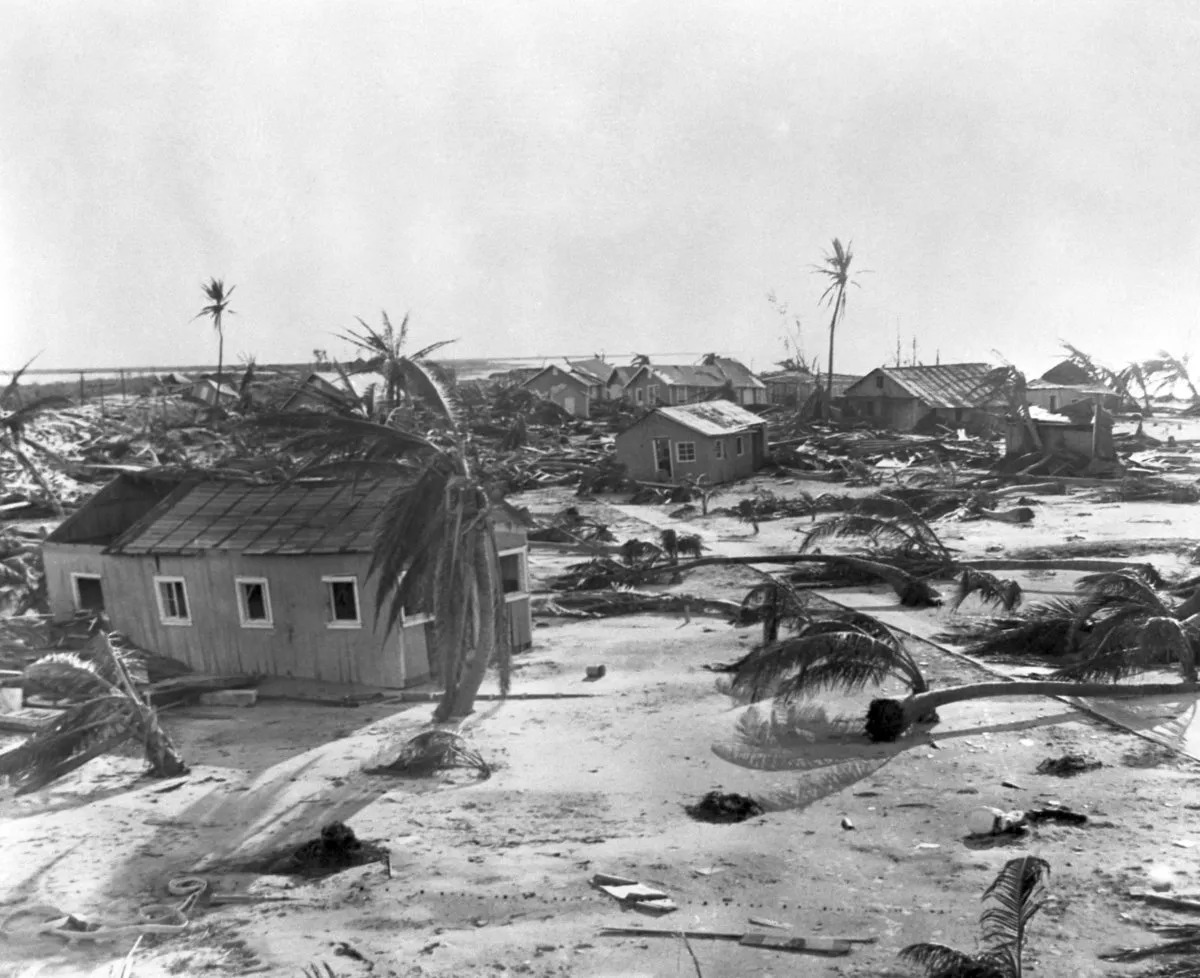
From top to bottom, left to right:
- The Second Italo-Ethiopian War begins as Italy invades Ethiopia, signaling growing tensions in Europe and Africa;
- The Nuremberg Laws are enacted in Nazi Germany, depriving Jews of citizenship and basic rights and cementing the regime’s racial policies;
- The 1935 Greek coup attempt unfolds in March but is swiftly suppressed, highlighting political instability in Greece;
- The 1935 Yangtze flood devastates large parts of China, killing tens of thousands and displacing millions;
- The Harlem riot of 1935 breaks out in New York City, the city’s first modern race riot, reflecting deep social and racial tensions;
- The 1935 Labor Day hurricane strikes the Florida Keys with unprecedented force, becoming one of the most intense hurricanes in U.S. history.

1935 (MCMXXXV) was a common year starting on Tuesday of the Gregorian calendar, the 1935th year of the Common Era (CE) and Anno Domini (AD) designations, the 935th year of the 2nd millennium, the 35th year of the 20th century, and the 6th year of the 1930s decade.

== Events ==
=== January ===
- January 7 – Italian premier Benito Mussolini and French Foreign Minister Pierre Laval conclude an agreement, in which each power agrees not to oppose the other's colonial claims.
- January 12 – Amelia Earhart becomes the first person to successfully complete a solo flight from Hawaii to California, a distance of 2,408 mi (3,875 km).
- January 13 – A referendum in the Territory of the Saar Basin shows that 90.3% of those voting wish to join Germany.
- January 24 – The first canned beer is sold in Richmond, Virginia, United States, by Gottfried Krueger Brewing Company.

=== February ===
- February 6 – Parker Brothers begins selling the board game Monopoly in the United States.
- February 13 – Richard Hauptmann is convicted and sentenced to death for the kidnapping and murder of Charles Lindbergh Jr. in the United States.
- February 15 – The discovery and clinical development of Prontosil, the first broadly effective antibiotic, is published in a series of articles by Gerhard Domagk and others in Germany's pre-eminent medical journal, Deutsche Medizinische Wochenschrift.
- February 26
  - In Nazi Germany, Adolf Hitler orders reinstatement of the air force, the Luftwaffe, in violation of the 1919 Treaty of Versailles.
  - Robert Watson-Watt first demonstrates the use of radar to detect aircraft, at Daventry in the UK.

=== March ===
- March 1
  - 1935 Greek coup d'état attempt: Nikolaos Plastiras, Anastasios Papoulas and other Venizelists lead a coup against the People's Party government in Greece. The attempt is suppressed by March 11, and the leaders condemned to death for treason.
  - İsmet İnönü forms the new government in Turkey (the 8th government; during Atatürk's presidency, İnönü has served seven times as a prime minister).
- March 2 – King Prajadhipok (Rama VII) of Siam abdicates the throne; he is succeeded by his 9-year-old-nephew Ananda Mahidol (Rama VIII).
- March 16 – Adolf Hitler announces German re-armament in violation of the 1919 Treaty of Versailles.
- March 19 – Harlem riot of 1935: A race riot breaks out in Harlem (New York City), after a rumor circulates that a teenage Puerto Rican shoplifter in the S. H. Kress & Co. department store has been brutally beaten.
- March 21 – Reza Shah of Iran asks the international community to formally adopt the name "Iran" to refer to the country, in place of the name "Persia".
- March 22 – The world's first regular television program (by Fernsehsender Paul Nipkow) is transmitted from the Funkturm in Berlin, Germany.

=== April ===
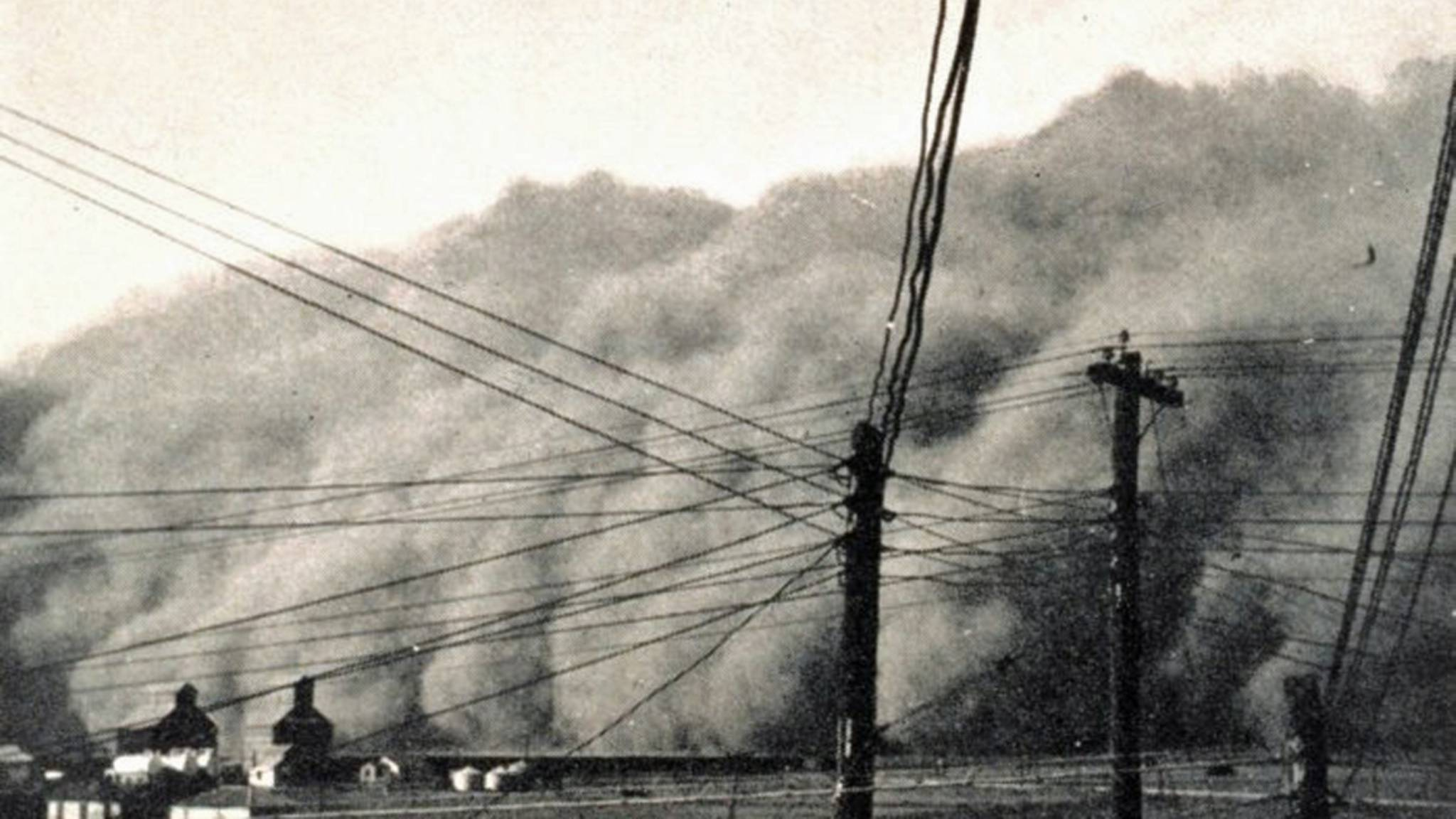
Dust storm approaching Spearman, Texas

- April 11 – The 1935 Danish general election is held, resulting in Thorvald Stauning becoming the first Social Democratic Prime Minister of Denmark.
- April 14 – Dust Bowl: "Black Sunday", the great dust storm in the United States hits eastern New Mexico and Colorado, and western Oklahoma the hardest (it will be made famous by Woody Guthrie, in his "dust bowl ballads").
- April 15 – The Roerich Pact, a Pan-American treaty on the protection of cultural artefacts, is signed in Washington, D.C.
- April 17 – Sun Myung Moon, a teenage Presbyterian convert in Korea under Japanese rule, claims to have a revelation from Jesus, telling him to complete his mission from almost 2,000 years ago.
- April 24 – William Christian Bullitt Jr., the United States Ambassador to the Soviet Union, hosts the elaborately prepared Spring Ball of the Full Moon, which is said to have surpassed all other embassy parties in Moscow's history.
- April 27 – Sheffield Wednesday beat West Bromwich Albion 4–2 at Wembley Stadium in England to win the FA Cup final.
- April 29 – The first edition of the Vuelta a España is raced, and goes on to become one of the 3 Grand Tours of road bicycle racing.

=== May ===
- May 13 – T. E. Lawrence ("Lawrence of Arabia") is involved in a motorcycle accident, near his home in Dorset, England, resulting in his death a few days later.
- May 14 – Northamptonshire County Cricket Club gains (over Somerset at Taunton by 48 runs) what proves to be their last victory for 99 matches, easily a record in the County Championship. Their next Championship win is not until May 29, 1939.
- May 15 – Joseph Stalin opens the Moscow Metro to the public.
- May 21 – In Nazi Germany, Adolf Hitler announces the reintroduction of conscription to the Wehrmacht, in violation of the 1919 Treaty of Versailles.
- May 22 – The 1912-1935 Ethnic Rebellion of Cambodia ends at the Siege of Nam Nung as inter-tribal leader Pa-Trang-Loeng suffers a mortal wound.
- May 27 – Schechter Poultry Corp. v. United States (the "Sick Chicken Case"): The Supreme Court of the United States declares that the National Industrial Recovery Act, a major component of the New Deal, is unconstitutional.
- May 29 – The French Compagnie Générale Transatlantique ocean liner SS Normandie sets out on her maiden voyage from Le Havre to New York, which she will reach in 4 days, 3 hours and 14 minutes, taking the Blue Riband; she gains the eastbound record on her return passage.
- May 31
  - 1935 Quetta earthquake: A 7.1 magnitude earthquake destroys Quetta in modern-day Pakistan, killing 40,000.
  - Twentieth Century Pictures and Fox Film Corporation merge to form Twentieth Century-Fox Film Corporation.

=== June ===
- June 9 – He–Umezu Agreement: China's Kuomintang government concedes Japanese military control of north-eastern China.
- June 10 – Alcoholics Anonymous is founded in Akron, Ohio, United States, by William G. Wilson and Dr. Robert Smith.
- June 12 – The Chaco War between Paraguay and Bolivia ends.
- June 13 – James J. Braddock defeats Max Baer at Madison Square Garden Bowl, to win the heavyweight boxing championship of the world.
- June 18 – Anglo-German Naval Agreement: Britain agrees to a German navy equal to 35% of her own naval tonnage.
- June 24 – Ten people, including musician Carlos Gardel, are killed in a collision between two Ford Trimotor airplanes at Olaya Herrera Airport in Medellín, Colombia.

=== July ===
- July 1 – RMS Mauretania (1906) sails from Southampton to Rosyth to be broken up.
- July 22 – Inauguration of the Brazilian radiophonic program A Voz do Brasil.
- July 25–August 20 – The seventh and last congress of the Comintern is held.

=== August ===
- August 2 – The Government of India Act is passed by the British Parliament, making provision for the establishment of a "Federation of India" and a degree of autonomy.
- August 13 – An estimated 250 people are killed when a dam bursts near Ovada, Italy.
- August 14 – United States President Franklin D. Roosevelt signs the Social Security Act into law.
- August 16 – Representatives of France, Britain and Italy meet in Paris in an unsuccessful attempt to negotiate a solution to the Abyssinia Crisis.

=== September ===
- September 2 – 1935 Labor Day hurricane: The strongest hurricane ever to strike the United States landfalls in the Upper Florida Keys as a Category 5 storm with 185 mph winds, killing 423.
- September 3 – English driver Sir Malcolm Campbell becomes the first person to drive an automobile at 300 miles per hour in Blue Bird, establishing a new absolute land speed record of 301.337 mph (484.955 km/h) on the Bonneville Salt Flats in Utah.
- September 13 – American aviator Howard Hughes, flying the Hughes H-1 Racer, sets an airspeed record of 352 mph (566 km/h).
- September 15 – The Nuremberg Laws go into effect in Germany, removing citizenship from Jews.
- September 17 – Manuel L. Quezon is elected 2nd President of the Philippines.
- September 24 – Earl W. Bascom and his brother Weldon produce the first night rodeo held outdoors under electric lights, at Columbia, Mississippi.
- September 29 – The London and North Eastern Railway's first A4 Class streamlined steam locomotive A4 2509 Silver Link makes her inaugural journey, from London King's Cross.
- September 30
  - U.S. President Franklin D. Roosevelt dedicates the Hoover Dam.
  - The London and North Eastern Railway commences the Silver Jubilee, Britain's first streamline train service.

=== October ===
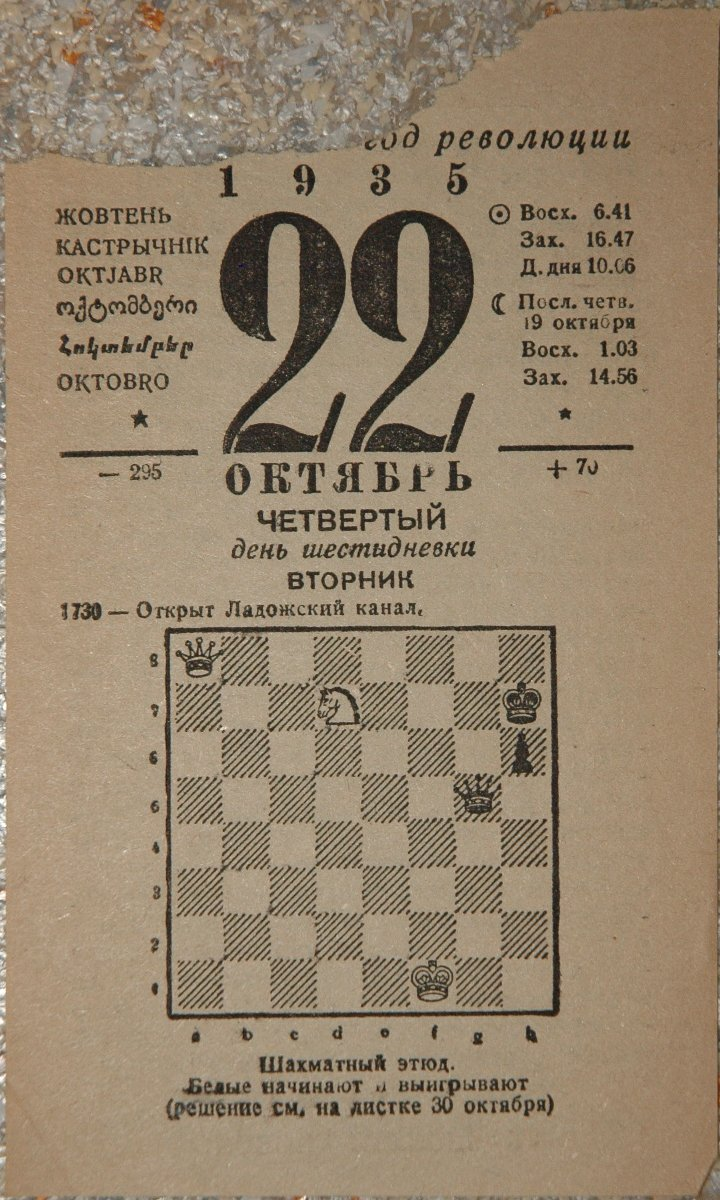
October 22 page from a Soviet revolutionary calendar with six-day weeks.

- October 2–3 – The Second Italo-Ethiopian War begins, as Italian General Emilio De Bono invades Ethiopia.
- October 6 – The wreckage of the RMS Lusitania is discovered.
- October 10 – A tornado destroys the 160-metre-tall (520 ft) wooden radio tower in Langenberg, Germany. As a result of this catastrophe, wooden radio towers are phased out.
- October 14
  - 1935 Canadian federal election: The Liberal Party of William Lyon Mackenzie King wins a majority government, defeating the Conservative Party of Prime Minister R. B. Bennett.
  - The Turkish government had all Masonic lodges in the country abolished on the ground that Masonic principles are incompatible with nationalistic policy and their property transferred to the state.
- October 21 – Grant v Australian Knitting Mills, a landmark case in consumer law, is decided on appeal in the Judicial Committee of the Privy Council in the U.K.
- October 22 – The Chinese Communist Party settles in Shaanxi after the Long March.

=== November ===
- November 3 – A Greek monarchy referendum is held by self-proclaimed Regent Georgios Kondylis. Almost 98% of the votes favor restoration of the monarchy, although the referendum's integrity is dubious.
- November 14 – 1935 United Kingdom general election: Prime Minister Stanley Baldwin returns to office at the head of a National Government led by the Conservative Party, with a large but reduced majority.
- November 22 – The flying boat China Clipper takes off from Alameda, California, United States, to deliver the first airmail cargo across the Pacific Ocean; on November 29 the aircraft reaches its final destination, Manila, and delivers over 110,000 pieces of mail.
- November 23 – Jacques and Thérèse Tréfouël, Daniel Bovet and Federico Nitti, in the laboratory of Ernest Fourneau at the Pasteur Institute in Paris, discover that sulfanilamide is the active component of Prontosil.
- November 25 – After 11 years in exile, George II returns to Greek soil as King of Greece at Corfu, from London.

=== December ===
- December 10 – Hanshin Tigers, a well known professional baseball club of Japan, is founded in Osaka.
- December 12
  - The Lebensborn program in support of Nazi eugenics is founded by Heinrich Himmler in Germany.
  - The De La Warr Pavilion at Bexhill-on-Sea, designed by Erich Mendelsohn and Serge Chermayeff, a pioneering example of International Style architecture, opens in England.
- December 17 – The Douglas DST, prototype of the Douglas DC-3 airliner, first flies in the United States. More than 16,000 of the model will eventually be produced.
- December 18
  - Samuel Hoare resigns as British foreign secretary, and is replaced by Anthony Eden.
  - The socialist party of Sri Lanka, the Lanka Sama Samaja Party, is founded.
- December 27
  - In China, Mao Zedong issues the Wayaobu Manifesto, On Tactics Against Japanese Imperialism, calling for a National United Front against the Japanese invasion.
  - In Germany, Regina Jonas becomes the first woman ever to receive semikhah (ordination) as a rabbi within Judaism. She will be killed in Auschwitz concentration camp in 1944 and the next such ordination will be in 1972.
- December 28 – Pravda publishes a letter from Pavel Postyshev, who revives the New Year tree tradition in the Soviet Union.

== Births ==
=== January ===
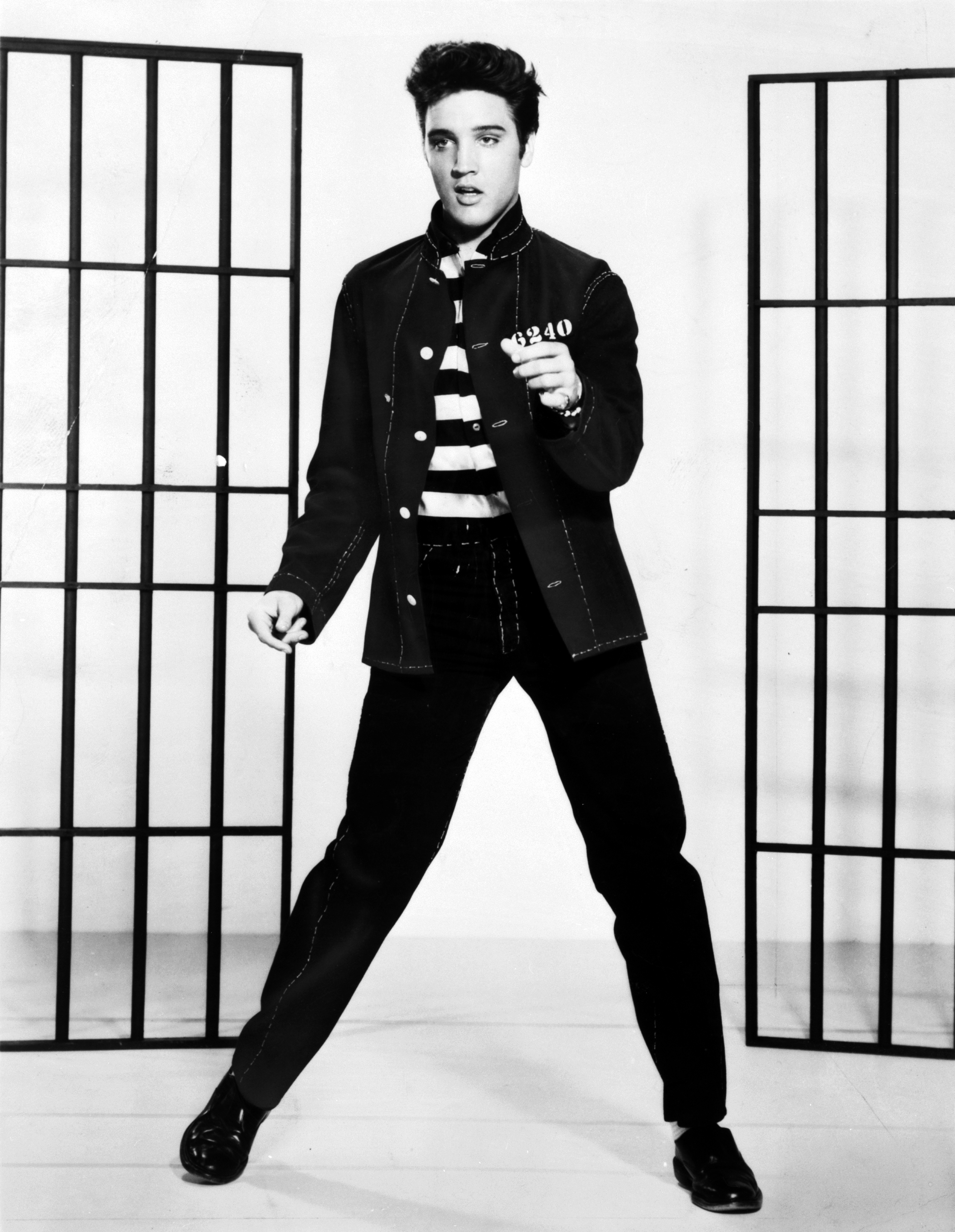
Elvis Presley

- January 4 – Floyd Patterson, African-American boxer (d. 2006)
- January 6 – Margarita Saxe-Coburg-Gotha, Spanish-born Bulgarian monarch
- January 7 – Valery Kubasov, Soviet and Russian cosmonaut (d. 2014)
- January 8 – Elvis Presley, American rock 'n' roll singer, guitarist and actor (d. 1977)
- January 9 – Manlio De Angelis, Italian actor (d. 2017)
- January 10 – Sherrill Milnes, American baritone
- January 14 – Lucile Wheeler, Canadian skier
- January 15 – Luigi Radice, Italian football player and manager (d. 2018)
- January 16
  - A. J. Foyt, American race car driver
  - Udo Lattek, German football coach (d. 2015)
- January 19 – Soumitra Chatterjee, Indian actor (d. 2020)
- January 21 – Andrew Sinclair, British novelist and biographer (d. 2019)
- January 25 – António Ramalho Eanes, 16th President of Portugal
- January 26 – Dame Paula Rego, Portuguese-born British visual artist (d. 2022)
- January 30
  - Richard Brautigan, American writer (d. 1984)
  - Elsa Martinelli, Italian film actress (d. 2017)
- January 31 – Kenzaburō Ōe, Japanese writer, Nobel Prize laureate (d. 2023)

=== February ===
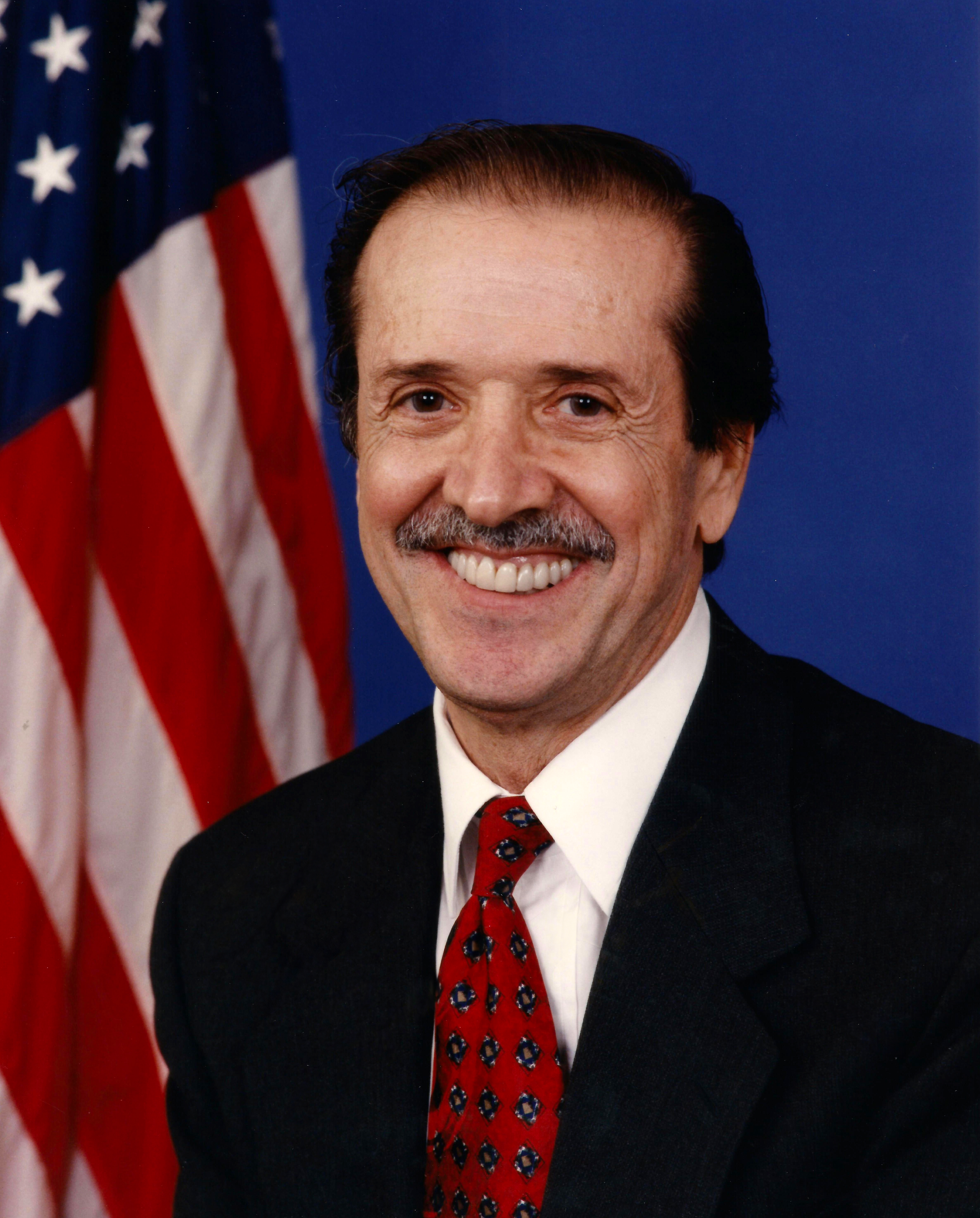
Sonny Bono

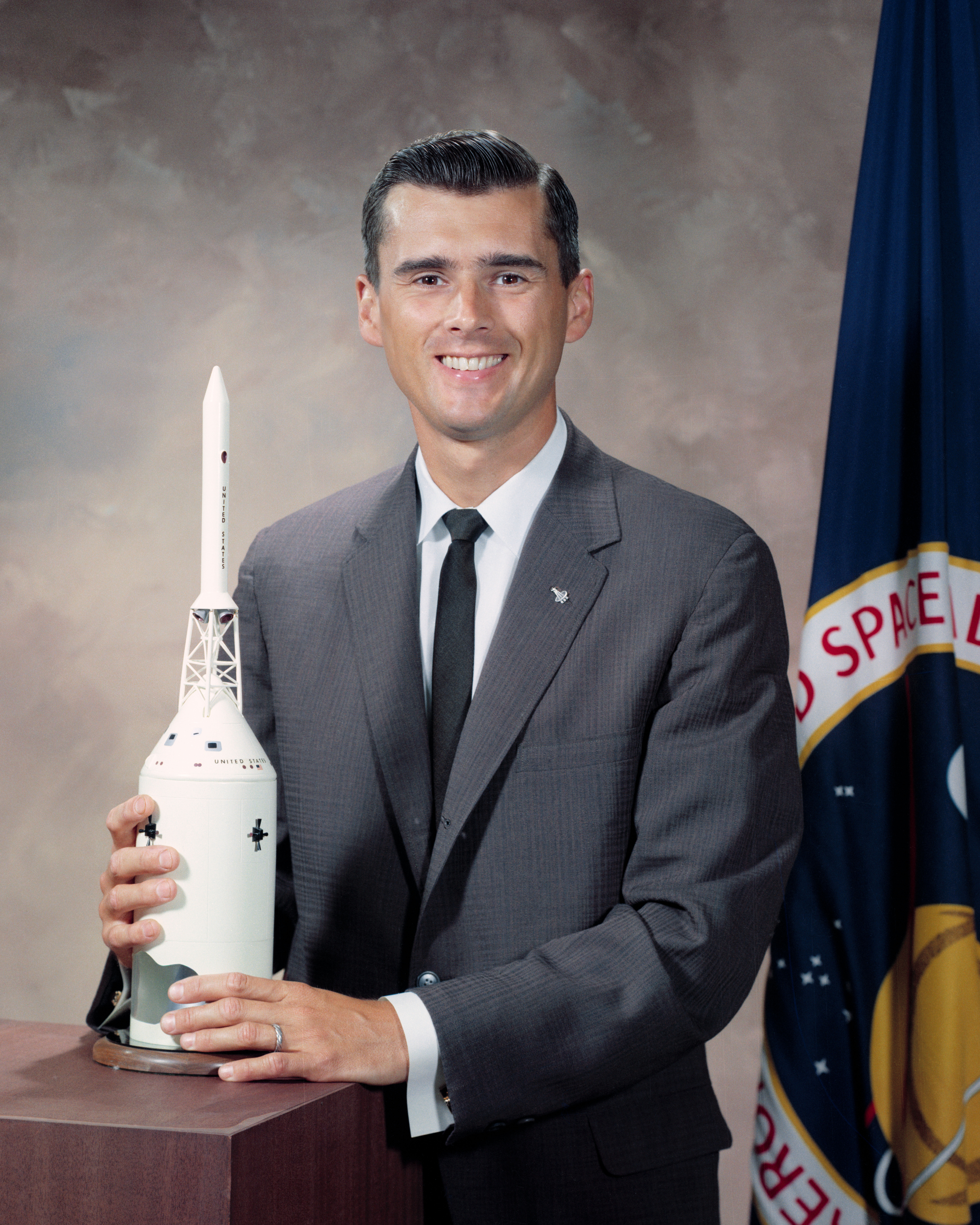
Roger B. Chaffee

- February 3 – Johnny "Guitar" Watson, African-American singer, songwriter and musician (d. 1996)
- February 4 – Martti Talvela, Finnish bass (d. 1989)
- February 11 – Gene Vincent, American guitarist and vocalist (d. 1971)
- February 15 – Roger B. Chaffee, American astronaut (d. 1967)
- February 16 – Sonny Bono, American singer, actor and politician (d. 1998)
- February 25 – Sally Jessy Raphael, American talk show host
- February 26
  - Artur Rasizade, Azerbaijani politician, 6th Prime Minister of Azerbaijan
  - Jane Wagner, American writer, director and producer
- February 27 – Mirella Freni, Italian soprano, Pavarotti's Friend (d. 2020)

=== March ===
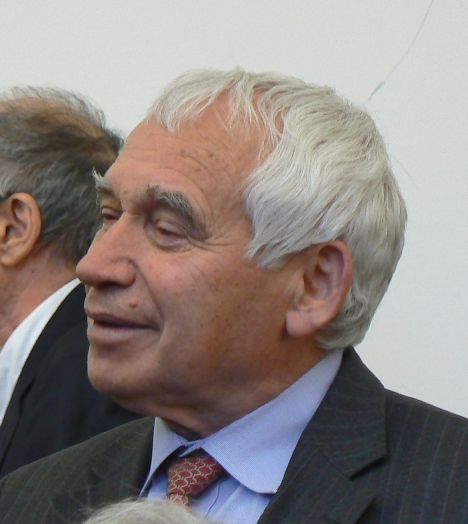
Zhelyu Zhelev

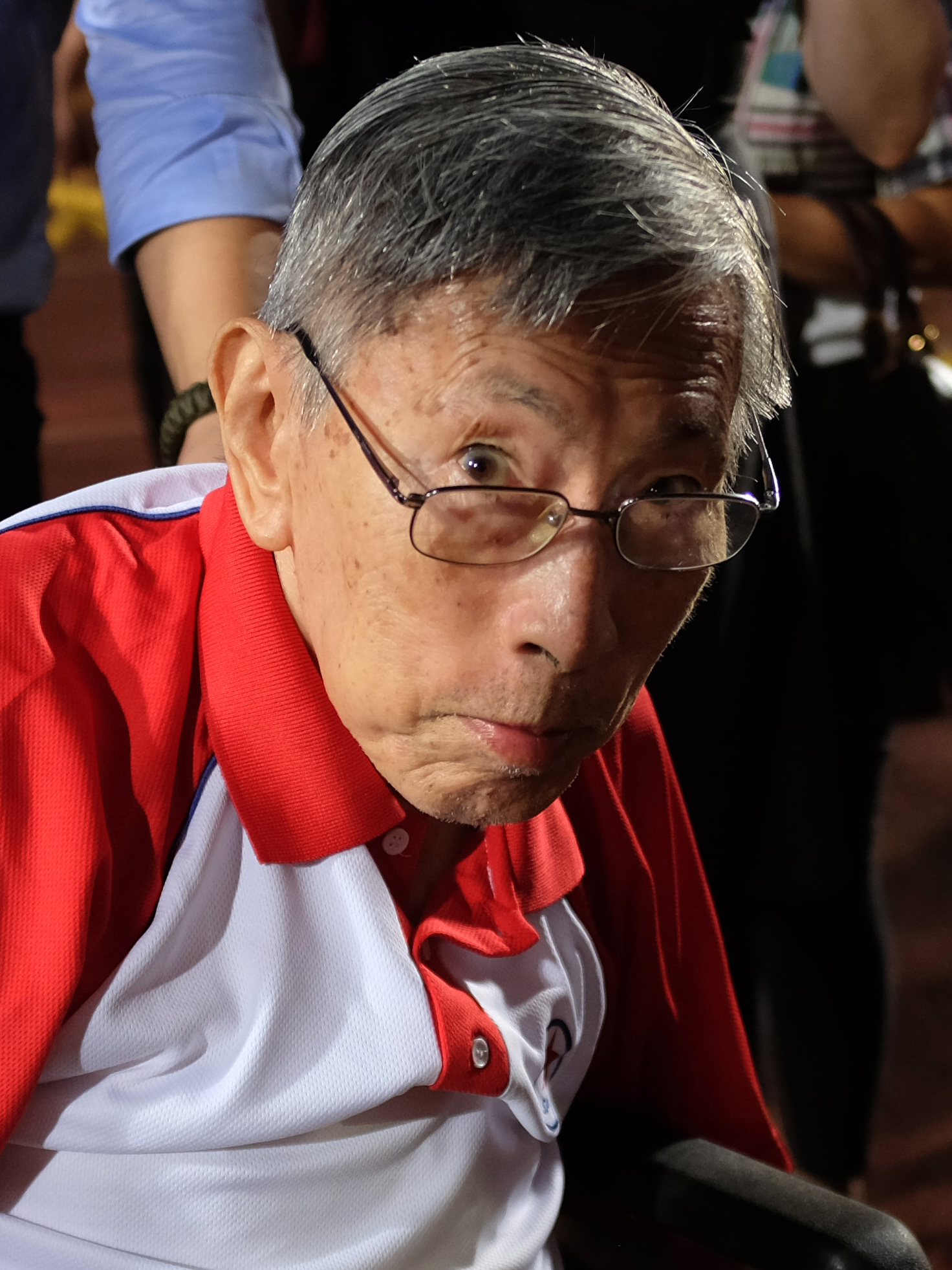
Chiam See Tong

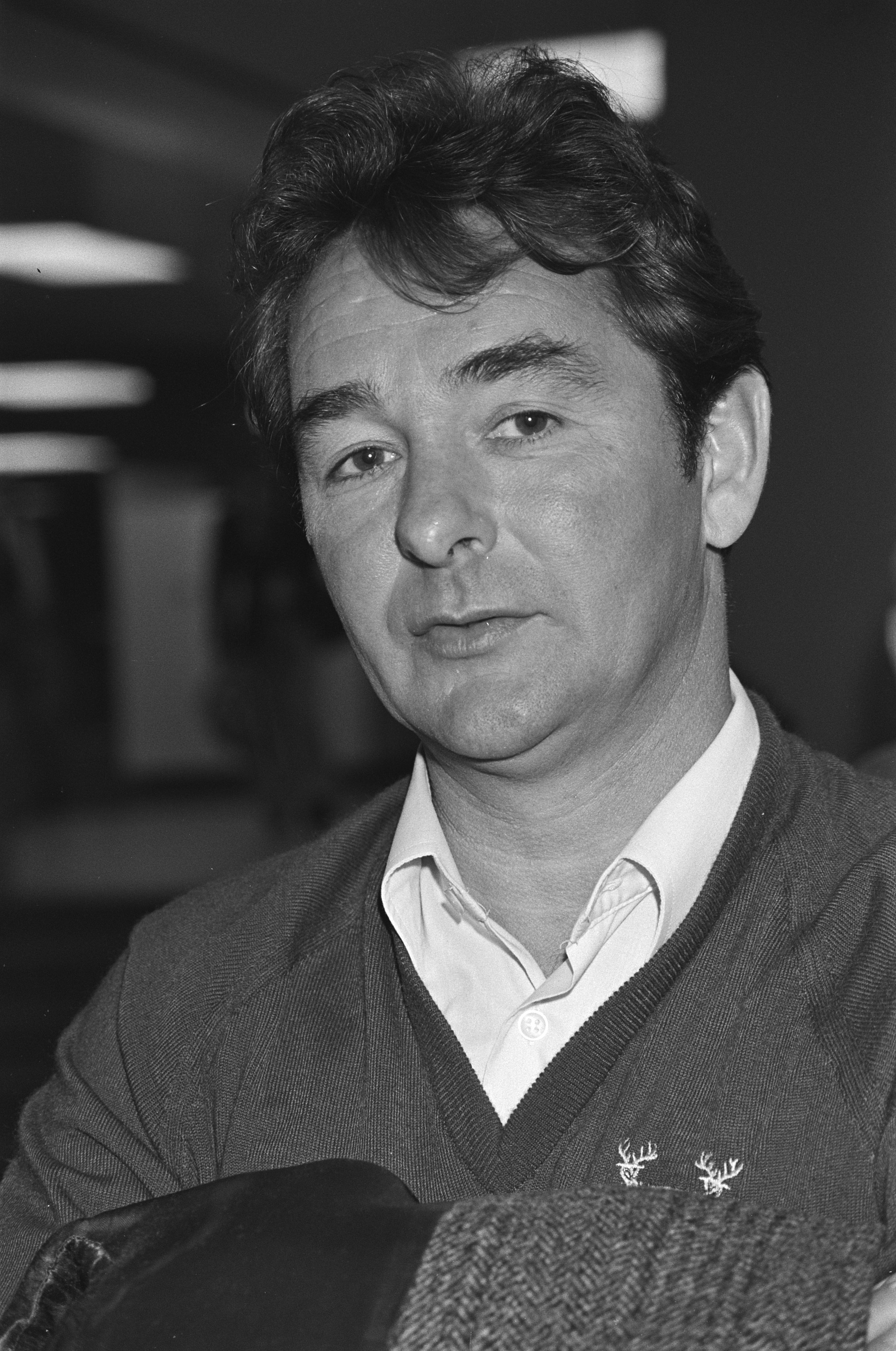
Brian Clough

- March 1 – Robert Conrad, American actor (d. 2020)
- March 3 – Zhelyu Zhelev, President of Bulgaria (d. 2015)
- March 4 – Bent Larsen, Danish chess player (d. 2010)
- March 12
  - Chiam See Tong, Singaporean lawyer and politician
  - Valentyna Shevchenko, Ukrainian politician (d. 2020)
- March 15 – Judd Hirsch, American actor
- March 16 – Sergei Yursky, Soviet and Russian actor (d. 2019)
- March 21 – Brian Clough, English footballer and manager (d. 2004)
- March 22 – Galina Gavrilovna Korchuganova, Russian-born Soviet test pilot and aerobatics champion (d. 2004)
- March 24 – Peter Bichsel, Swiss writer (d. 2025)
- March 27 – Julian Glover, English actor
- March 28 – Józef Szmidt, Polish athlete (d. 2024)
- March 31
  - Ruth Escobar, Portuguese-Brazilian actress, businesswoman and politician (d. 2017)
  - Herb Alpert, American trumpeter, bandleader and singer

=== April ===
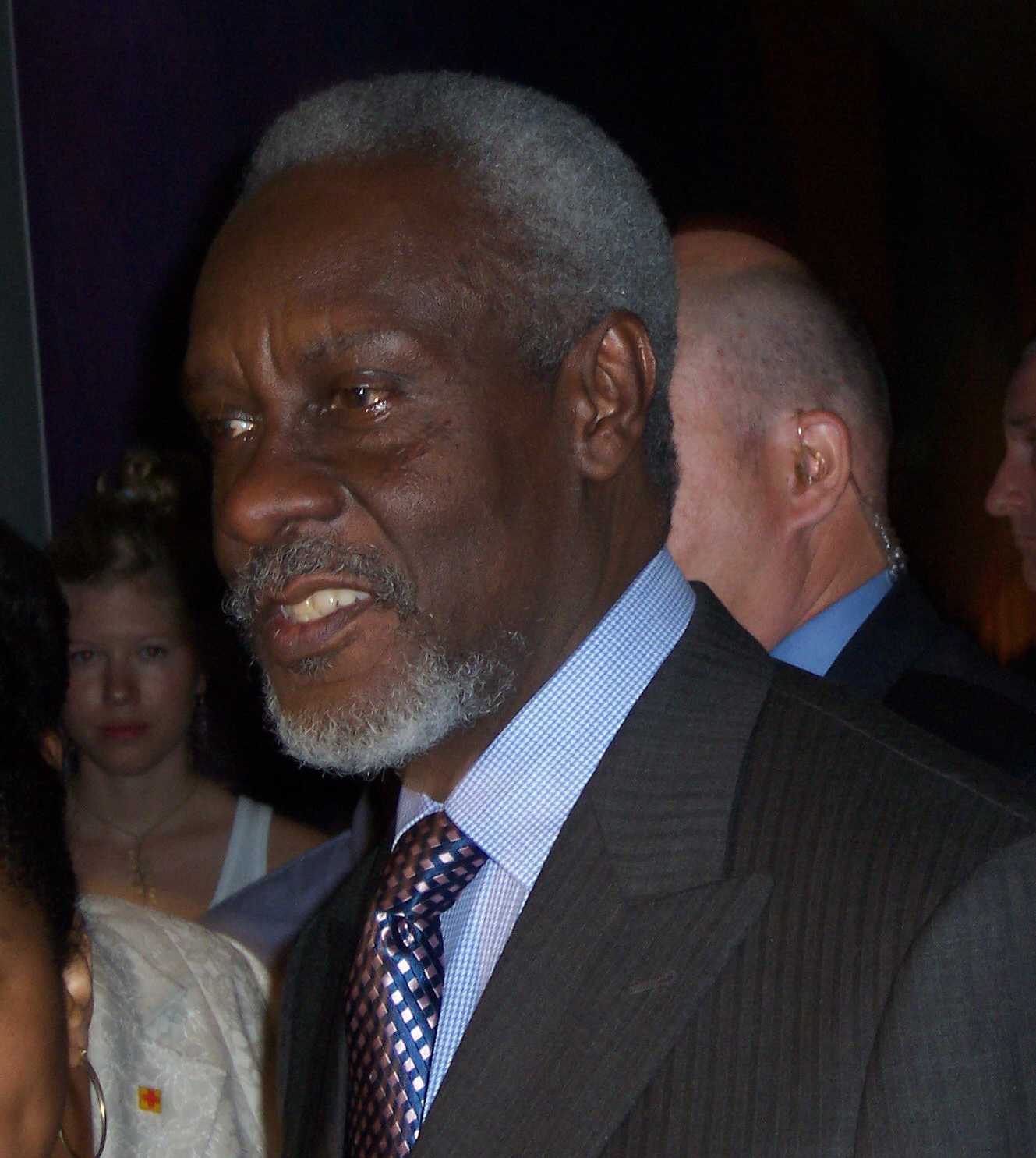
P. J. Patterson

- April 10 – P. J. Patterson, Jamaican politician, 6th Prime Minister of Jamaica
- April 14 – Erich von Däniken, Swiss mythographer and author (d. 2026)
- April 18 – Joanne Brekke, American politician (d. 2017)
- April 19 – Dudley Moore, English actor, comedian, pianist and composer (d. 2002)
- April 21 – Charles Grodin, American actor, journalist and talk show host (d. 2021)
- April 22
  - Paul Chambers, American jazz musician (d. 1969)
  - Jerry Fodor, American philosopher and cognitive scientist (d. 2017)
  - Mac Maharaj, retired South African politician
- April 25 – Jim Peebles, Canadian-born theoretical cosmologist, winner of the Nobel Prize in Physics
- April 27 – Theo Angelopoulos, Greek filmmaker, screenwriter and film producer (d. 2012)

=== May ===
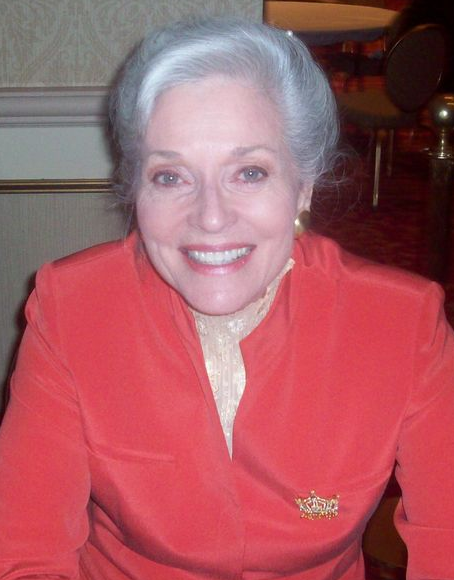
Lee Meriwether

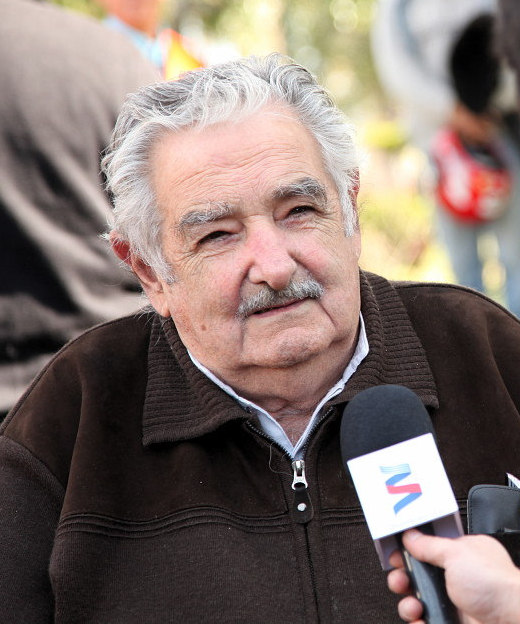
José Mujica

- May 2
  - Faisal II, last king of Iraq (d. 1958)
  - Luis Suárez, Spanish footballer (d. 2023)
- May 4 – Med Hondo, French voice actor and filmmaker (d. 2019)
- May 8
  - Jack Charlton, English footballer and manager (d. 2020)
  - Princess Elisabeth of Denmark, Danish princess (d. 2018)
- May 9 – Roger Hargreaves, English author and illustrator (d. 1988)
- May 12 – Gary Peacock, American jazz double-bassist (d. 2020)
- May 13 – Luciano Benetton, Italian entrepreneur, owner of Benetton Group
- May 14 – Ivan Dimitrov, Bulgarian footballer (d. 2019)
- May 15
  - Don Bragg, American athlete (d. 2019)
  - Ted Dexter, English cricketer (d. 2021)
- May 20 – José Mujica, 40th President of Uruguay (d. 2025)
- May 27 – Lee Meriwether, American beauty queen and actress
- May 29 – André Brink, South African writer (d. 2015)
- May 31 – Jim Bolger, 35th Prime Minister of New Zealand (d. 2025)

=== June ===
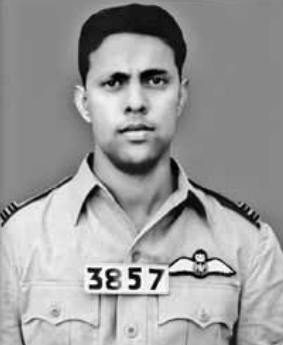
Yunus Hussain

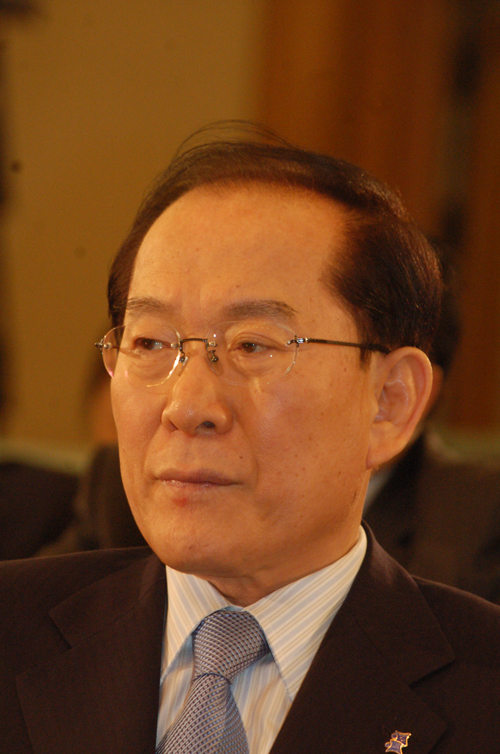
Lee Hoi-chang

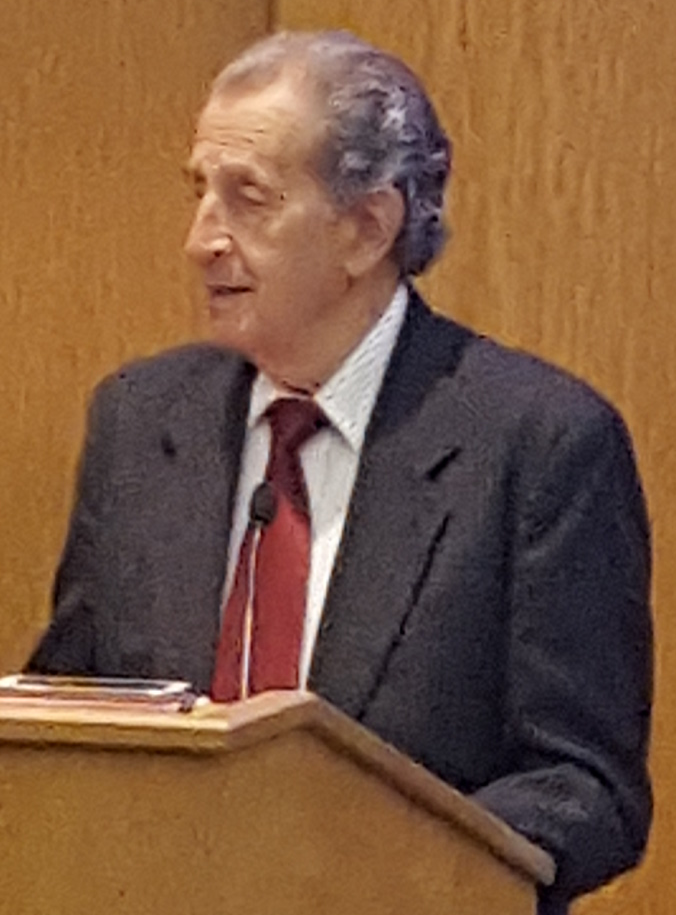
Rodrigo Borja Cevallos

- June 1
  - Norman Foster, English architect
  - Yunus Hussain, Pakistani fighter pilot (d. 1965)
- June 2
  - Lee Hoi-chang, South Korean politician, 26th Prime Minister of South Korea
  - Carol Shields, American-born writer (d. 2003)
- June 13
  - Christo and Jeanne-Claude, Bulgarian & Moroccan-born American installation artists (Jeanne-Claude d. 2009) (Christo d. 2020)
  - Samak Sundaravej, 25th Prime Minister of Thailand (2008) (d. 2009)
- June 17 – Peggy Seeger, American folk singer
- June 19 – Rodrigo Borja Cevallos, 36th President of Ecuador (d. 2025)
- June 24 – Terry Riley, American composer
- June 25 – Larry Kramer, American playwright, author, and activist (d. 2020).
- June 28 – Nicola Tempesta, Italian judoka (d. 2021)
- June 30 – Valentino Gasparella, Italian track cyclist

=== July ===
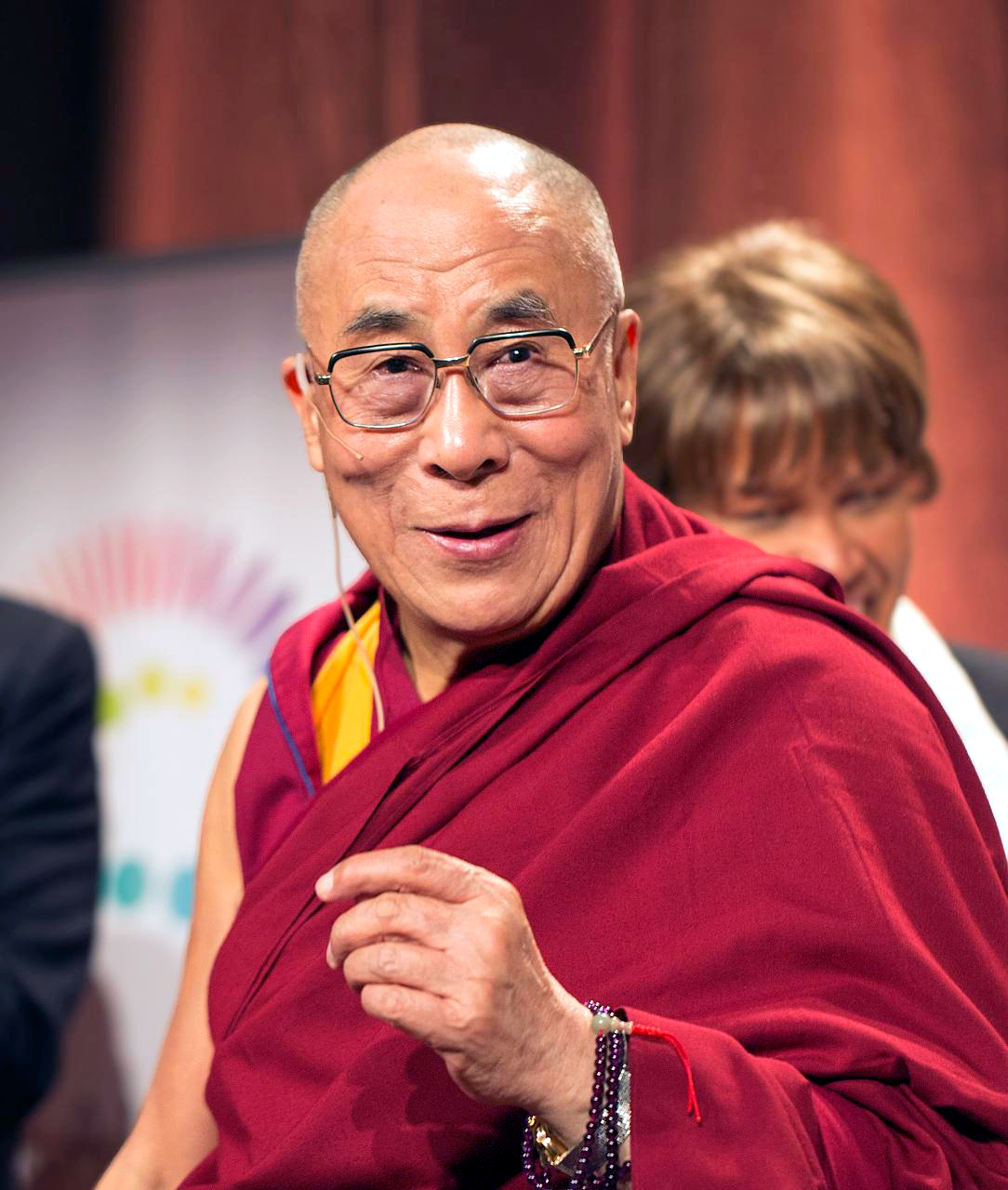
14th Dalai Lama

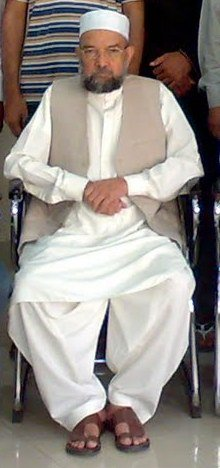
MM Alam

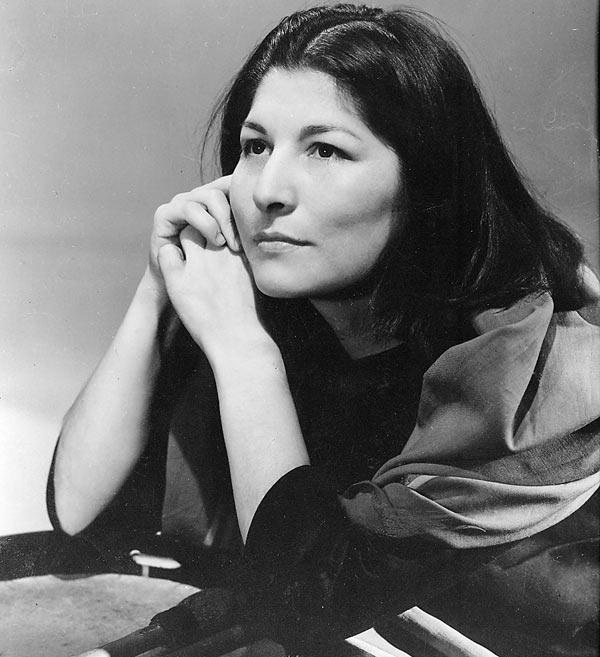
Mercedes Sosa

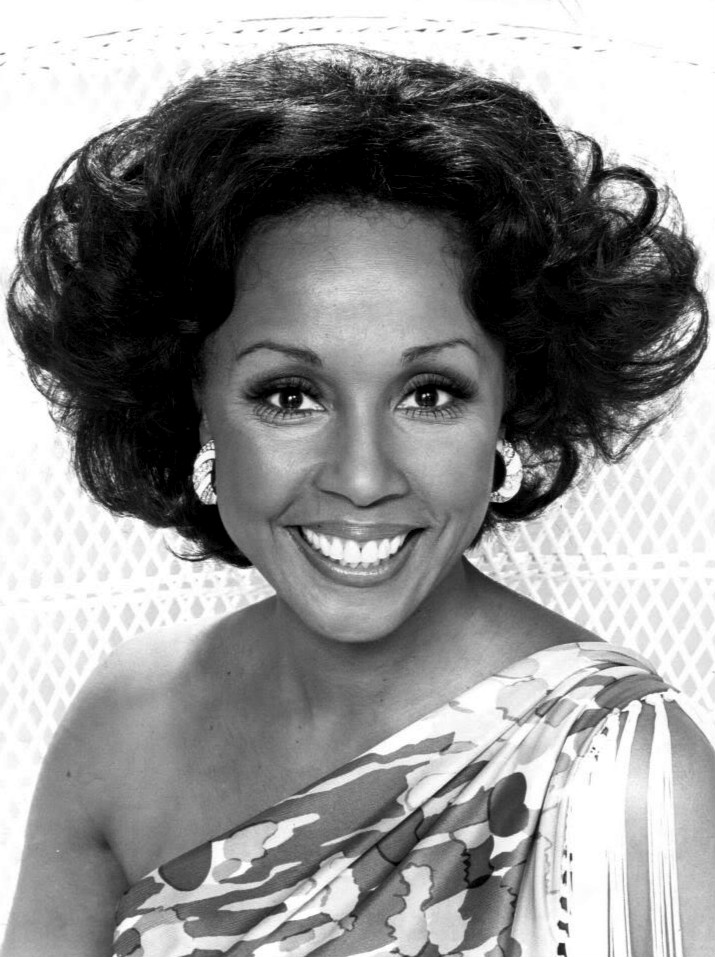
Diahann Carroll

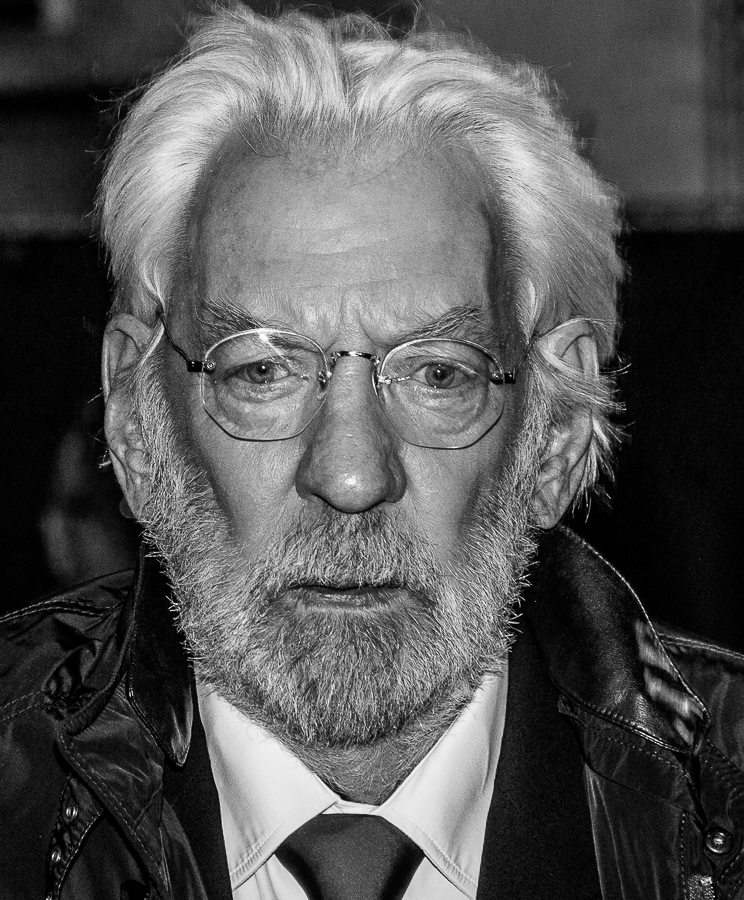
Donald Sutherland

- July 1 – David Prowse, English actor (d. 2020)
- July 3
  - Harrison Schmitt, American geologist, NASA astronaut and politician
  - John Swan, Bermudian political figure; 4th Premier of Bermuda (d. 2026)
- July 6
  - 14th Dalai Lama
  - Muhammad Mahmood Alam, Pakistani flying ace (d. 2013)
- July 8
  - Steve Lawrence, American singer and actor (d. 2024)
  - Vitaly Sevastyanov, Soviet and Russian cosmonaut (d. 2010)
- July 9
  - Wim Duisenberg, Dutch economist and politician (d. 2005)
  - Mercedes Sosa, Argentine singer (d. 2009)
- July 12
  - Hans Tilkowski, German footballer (d. 2020)
  - Satoshi Ōmura, Japanese biochemist, Nobel Prize laureate
- July 13
  - Jack Kemp, American football player, U.S. vice presidential candidate (d. 2009)
  - Kurt Westergaard, Danish cartoonist (d. 2021)
- July 14 – Ei-ichi Negishi, Japanese chemist and Nobel laureate (d. 2021)
- July 15 – Ken Kercheval, American actor (d. 2019)
- July 17
  - Diahann Carroll, African-American actress and singer (d. 2019)
  - Donald Sutherland, Canadian actor (d. 2024)
- July 18 – Tenley Albright, American figure skater
- July 19 – Vasily Livanov, Soviet and Russian actor, animator and writer
- July 21 – Jeanne Arth, American Wimbledon and US Championships doubles tennis title holder
- July 25
  - Adnan Khashoggi, Saudi Arabian international arms dealer (d. 2017)
  - Barbara Harris, American actress (d. 2018)
- July 30 – Prince Moulay Abdallah of Morocco, Moroccan prince (d. 1983)

=== August ===
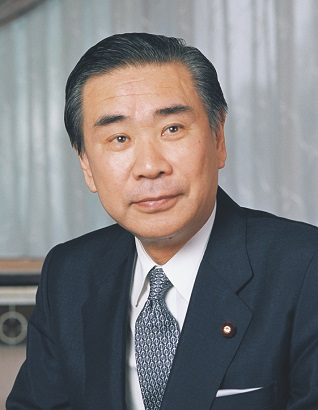
Tsutomu Hata

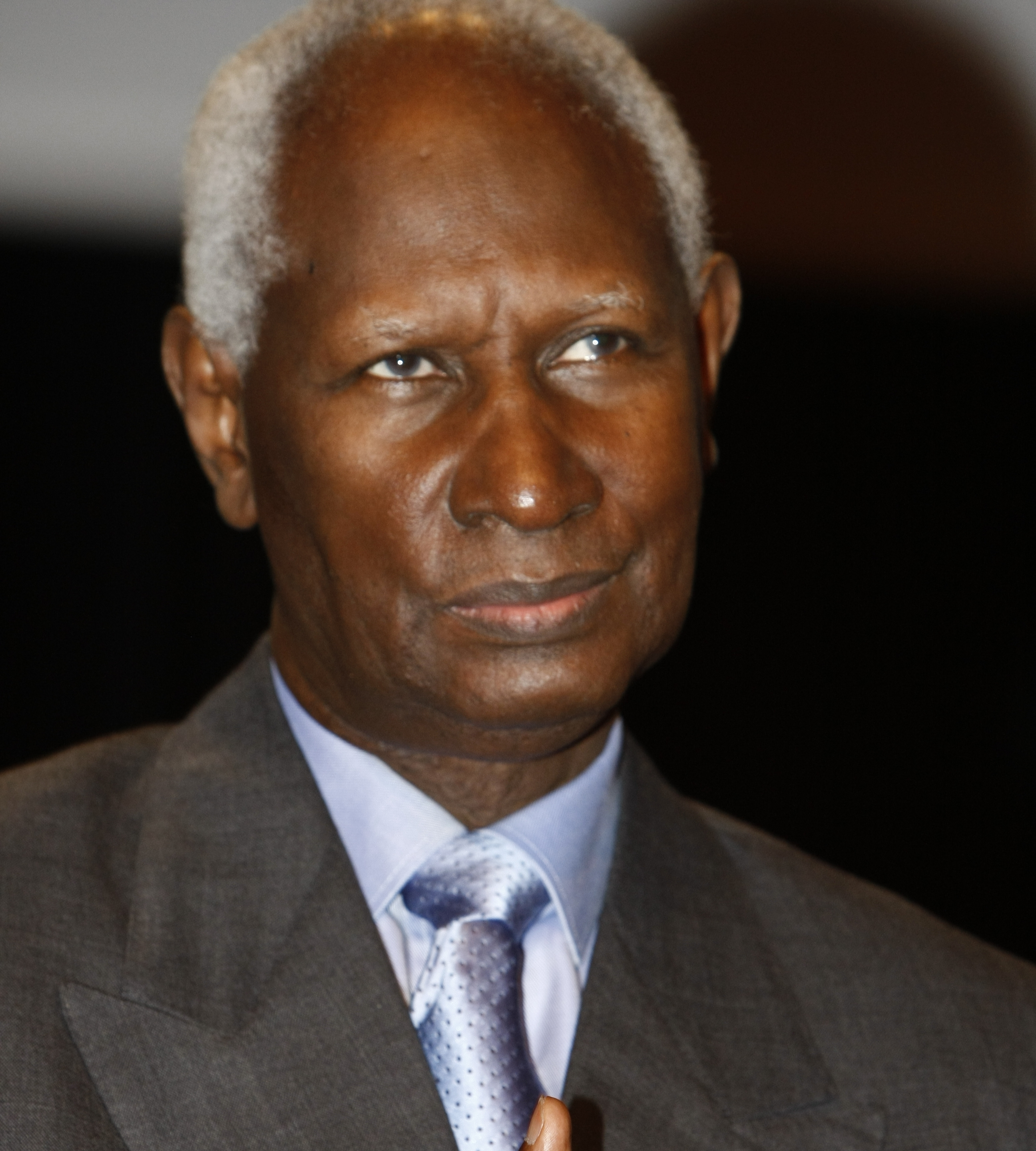
Abdou Diouf

- August 3 – Georgy Shonin, Soviet and Russian cosmonaut (d. 1997)
- August 10
  - Giya Kancheli, Soviet and Georgian composer (d. 2019)
  - Laurynas Stankevičius, 7th Prime Minister of Lithuania (d. 2017)
- August 12
  - Ján Popluhár, Slovak footballer (d. 2011)
  - John Cazale, American actor (d. 1978)
- August 17 – Oleg Tabakov, Soviet and Russian actor (d. 2018)
- August 18 – Rafer Johnson, African-American athlete (d. 2020)
- August 20 – Ron Paul, American author, physician, and politician
- August 21 – Ahmad al-Ghashmi, Yemeni general, 4th President of the Yemen Arab Republic (North Yemen) (d. 1978)
- August 22 – Annie Proulx, American novelist
- August 24 – Tsutomu Hata, 51st Prime Minister of Japan (d. 2017)
- August 25 – Loftus Roker, Bahamian politician (d. 2024)
- August 26 – Geraldine Ferraro, U.S. Congresswoman, vice presidential candidate (d. 2011)
- August 29 – William Friedkin, American film director (d. 2023)
- August 30 – John Phillips, American singer-songwriter (The Mamas & the Papas) (d. 2001)
- August 31 – Eldridge Cleaver, African-American political activist and writer (d. 1998)

=== September ===
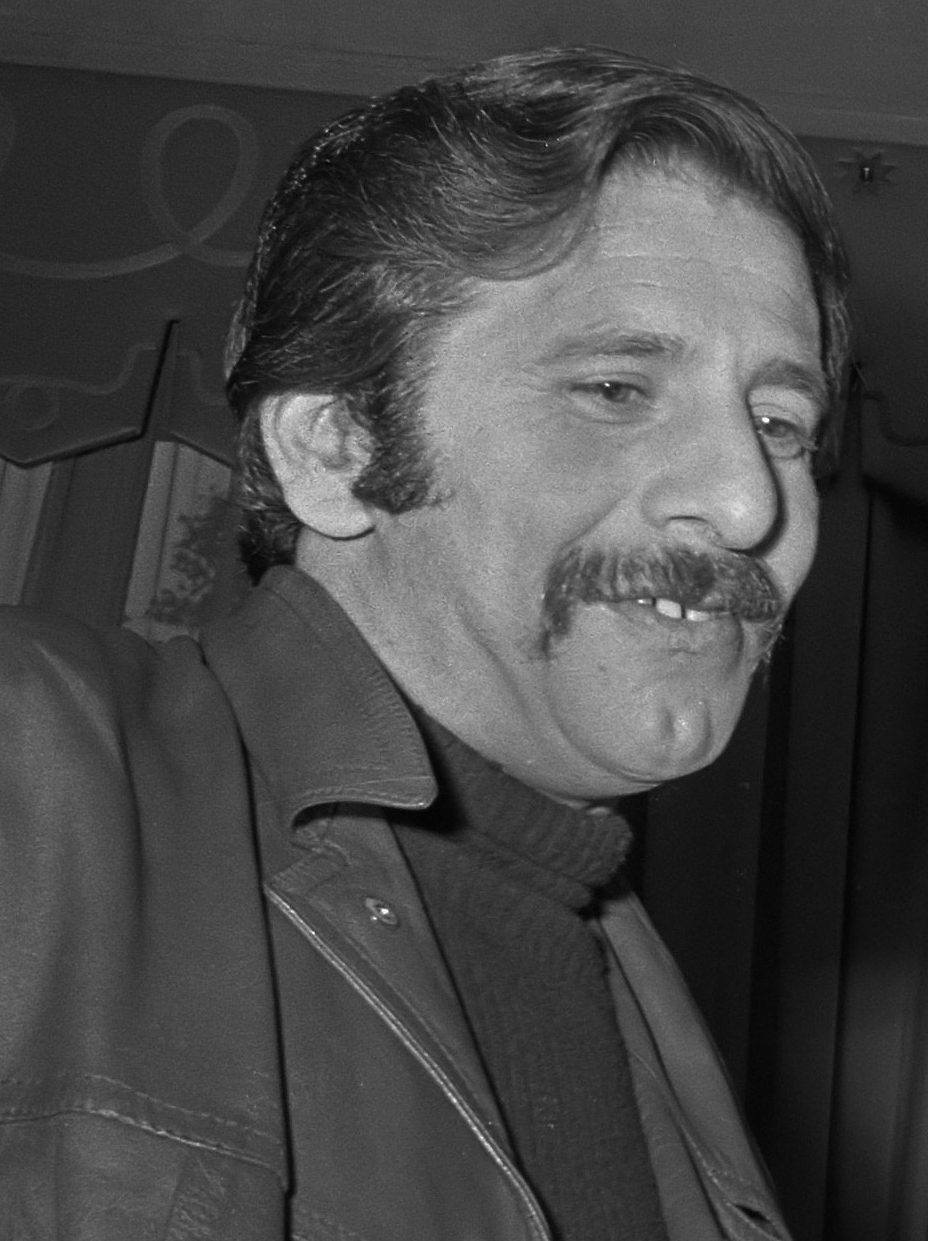
Chaim Topol

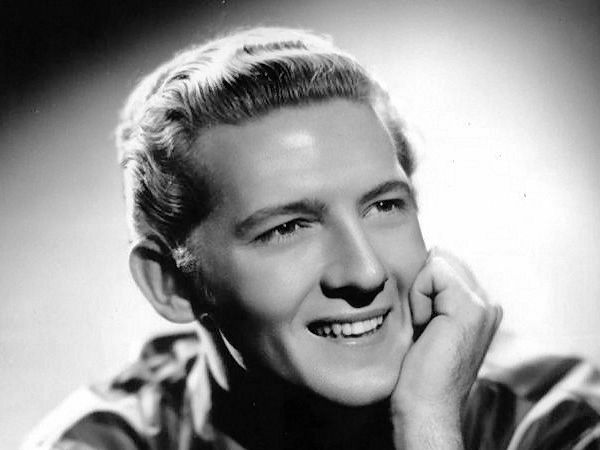
Jerry Lee Lewis

- September 1 – Seiji Ozawa, Japanese conductor (d. 2024)
- September 7 – Abdou Diouf, 2nd President of Senegal
- September 9 – Chaim Topol, Israeli actor and singer (Fiddler on the Roof) (d. 2023)
- September 10 – Mary Oliver, American poet, Pulitzer Prize for Poetry winner (d. 2019)
- September 11
  - Arvo Pärt, Estonian composer
  - Gherman Titov, Soviet and Russian cosmonaut (d. 2000)
- September 12 – Harvey J. Alter, American virologist, Nobel Prize recipient
- September 15 – Dinkha, Iraqi patriarch (d. 2015)
- September 16
  - Carl Andre, American artist (d. 2024)
  - Esther Vilar, Argentine-German writer known for The Manipulated Man
- September 17 – Ken Kesey, American author (d. 2001)
- September 21 – Jimmy Armfield, English footballer (d. 2018)
- September 29
  - Mylène Demongeot, French actress (d. 2022)
  - Jerry Lee Lewis, American rock & roll musician (d. 2022)
- September 30 – Johnny Mathis, African-American singer

=== October ===
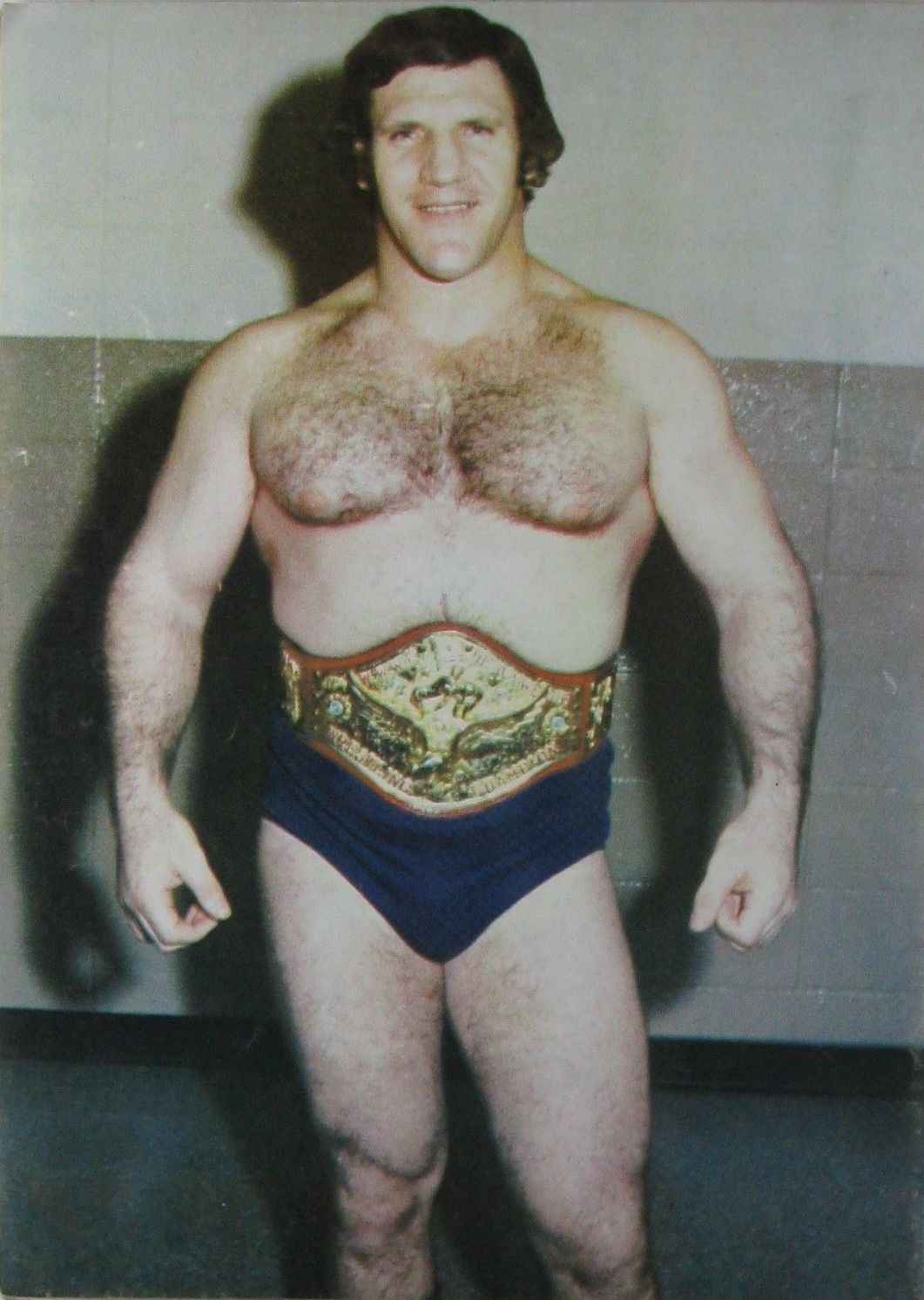
Bruno Sammartino

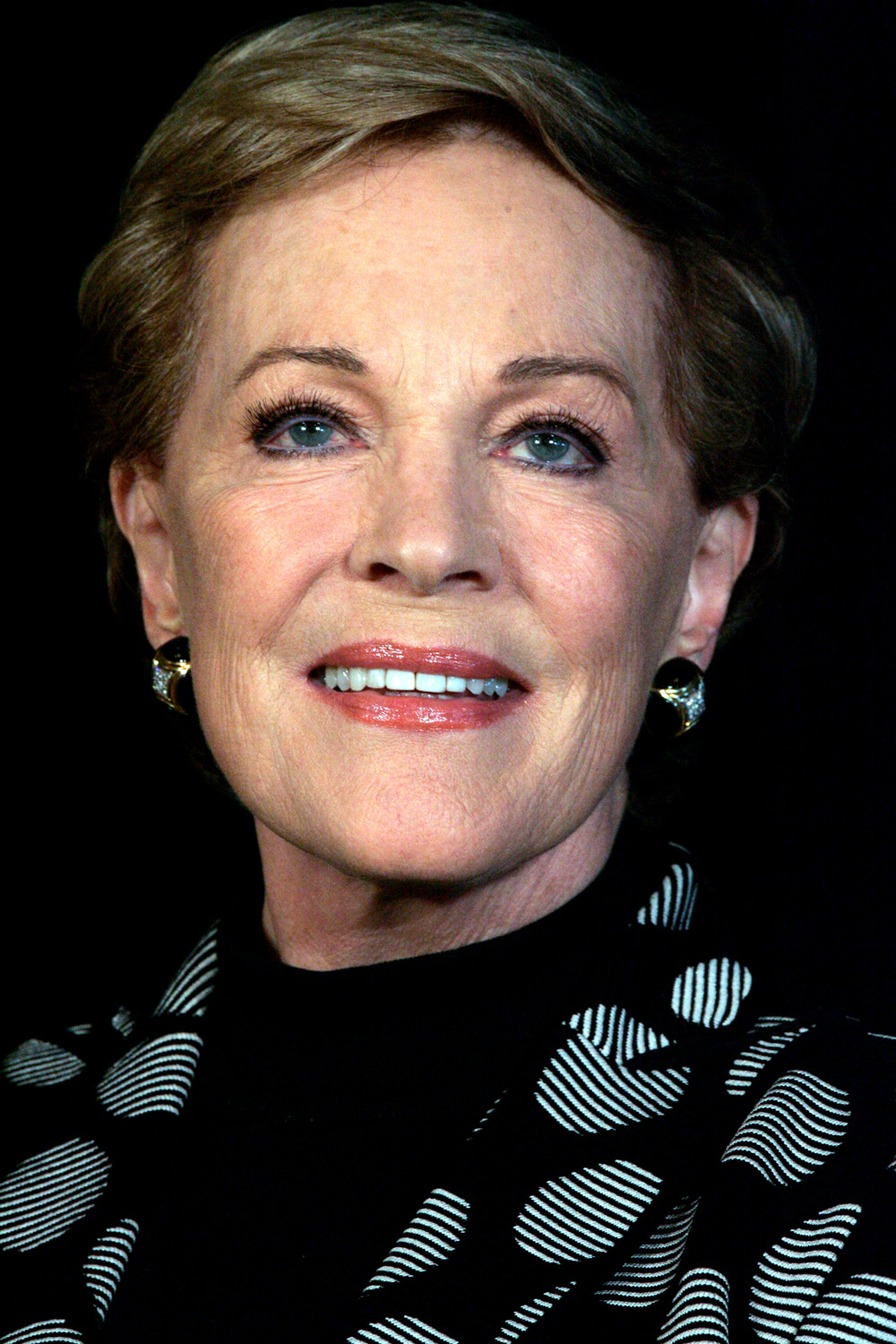
Dame Julie Andrews

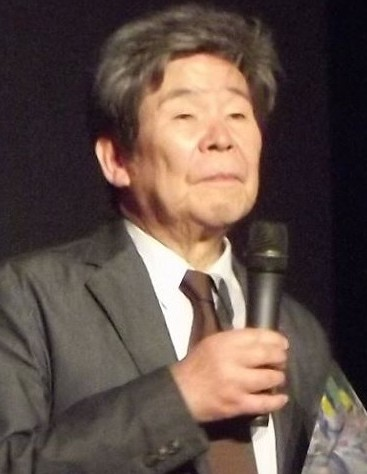
Isao Takahata

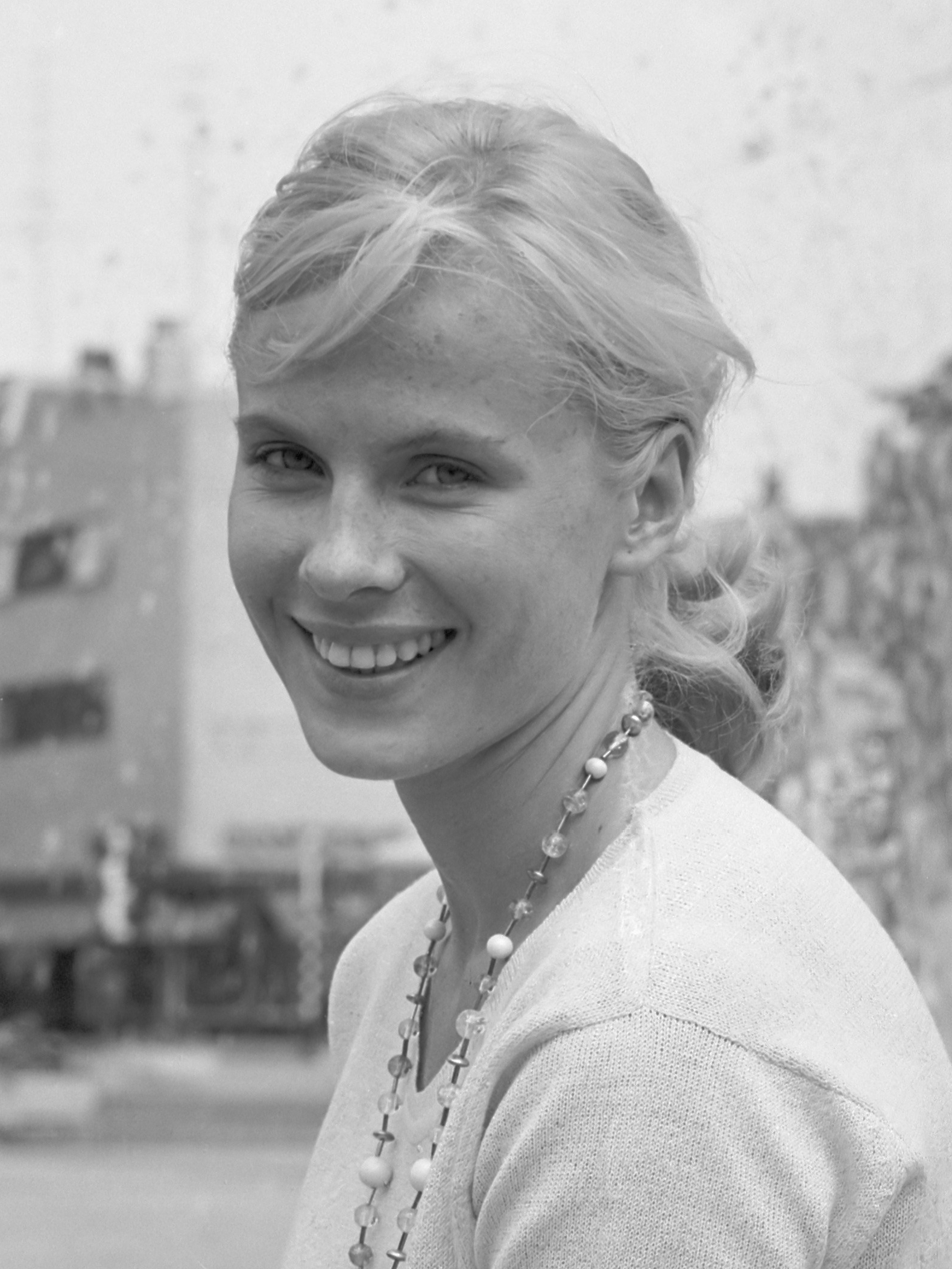
Bibi Andersson

- October 1 – Dame Julie Andrews, English singer and actress
- October 3
  - Charles Duke, American astronaut
  - Armen Dzhigarkhanyan, Soviet Russian-Armenian actor (d. 2020)
- October 6
  - Bruno Sammartino, Italian professional wrestler (d. 2018)
  - Aly Lotfy Mahmoud, Egyptian politician (d. 2018)
- October 9 – Prince Edward, Duke of Kent, Member of British Royal Family
- October 12 – Luciano Pavarotti, Italian tenor (d. 2007)
- October 14 – La Monte Young, American composer
- October 15
  - Bobby Morrow, American athlete (d. 2020)
  - Barry McGuire, American singer-songwriter
  - John Franklyn Mars, American businessman
- October 18 – Peter Boyle, American actor (d. 2006)
- October 20 – Jerry Orbach, American actor and singer (d. 2004)
- October 24 – Malcolm Bilson, American pianist
- October 25 – Rusty Schweickart, American astronaut
- October 29 – Isao Takahata, Japanese film director (d. 2018)
- October 30
  - Ágota Kristóf, Hungarian writer (d. 2011)
  - Michael Winner, British film director (d. 2013)
- October 31 – Ronald Graham, American mathematician (d. 2020)

=== November ===
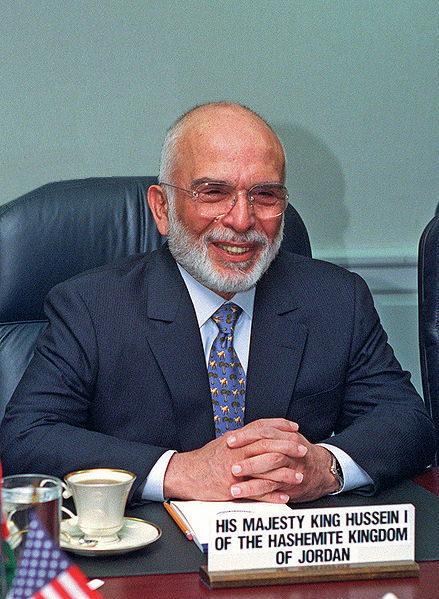
Hussein of Jordan

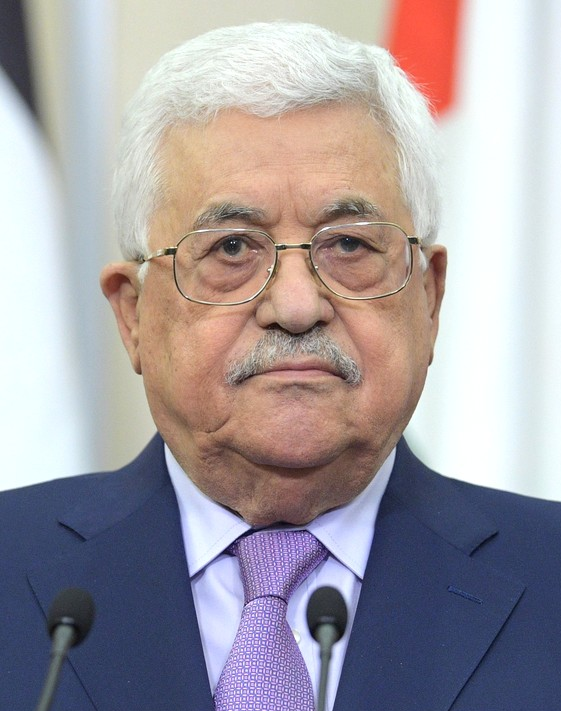
Mahmoud Abbas

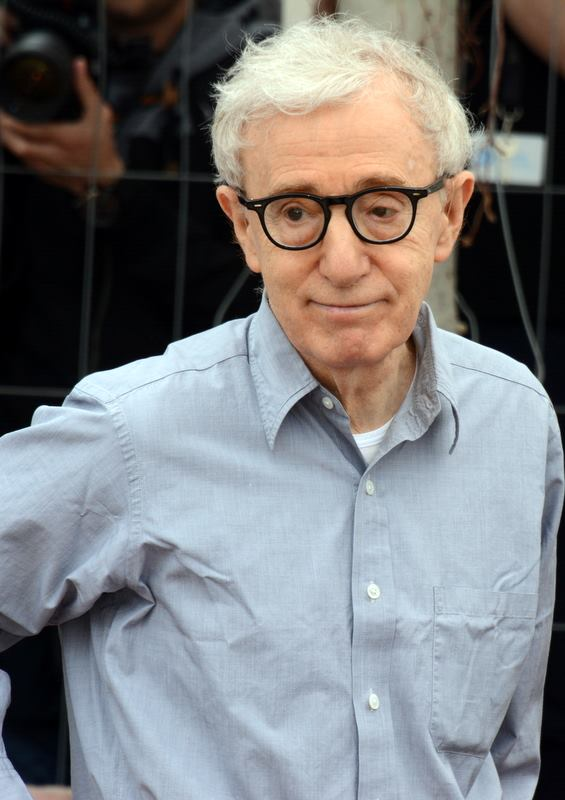
Woody Allen

- November 1
  - Edward Said, Palestinian-born literary critic (d. 2003)
  - Charles Koch, American businessman
  - Gary Player, South-African professional golfer
- November 3 – Abune Paulos, Ethiopian patriarch (d. 2012)
- November 6 – Archduchess Maria of Austria, German-Austrian royal (d. 2018)
- November 8
  - Alain Delon, French actor (d. 2024)
  - Alfonso López Trujillo, Colombian Cardinal (d. 2008)
- November 9 – Bob Gibson, American baseball player (d. 2020)
- November 11 – Bibi Andersson, Swedish actress (d. 2019)
- November 14 – King Hussein of Jordan (d. 1999)
- November 15
  - Mahmoud Abbas, President of the Palestine National Authority
  - Try Sutrisno, sixth vice president of Indonesia (d. 2026)
- November 16 – France-Albert René, 2nd President of Seychelles (d. 2019)
- November 17
  - Toni Sailer, Austrian skier (d. 2009)
  - Masatoshi Sakai, Japanese record producer (d. 2021)
- November 20 – Leo Falcam, Micronesian politician, president 1997–99 (d. 2018)
- November 22 – Ludmila Belousova, Russian figure skater (d.2017)
- November 23 – Vladislav Volkov, Soviet and Russian cosmonaut (d. 1971)
- November 27 – Helmut Lachenmann, German composer
- November 28 – Masahito, Prince Hitachi
- November 30 – Woody Allen, American actor and film director

=== December ===
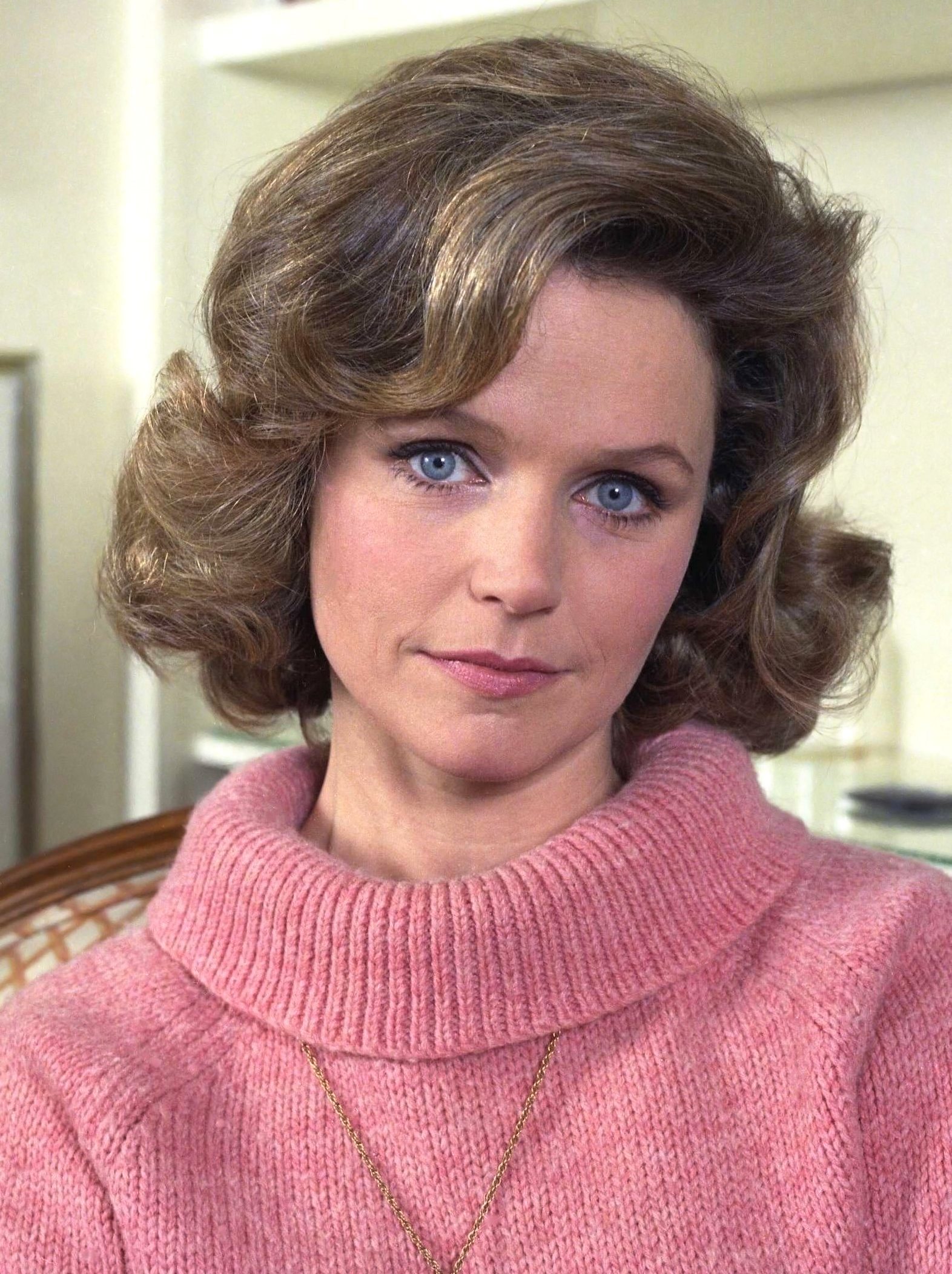
Lee Remick

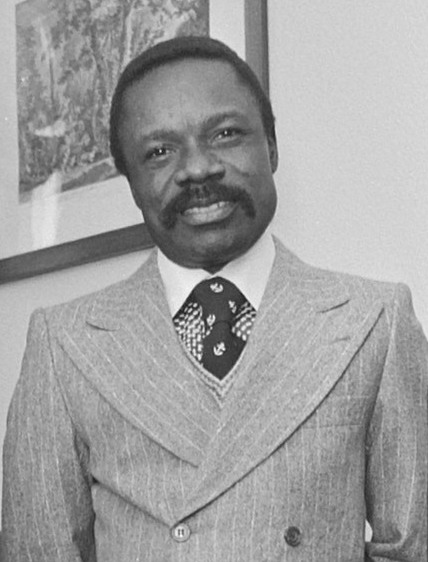
Omar Bongo

- December 4 – Paul H. O'Neill, 72nd US Treasury Secretary (d. 2020)
- December 8 – Dharmendra, Indian film actor, producer and politician (d. 2025)
- December 11 – Pranab Mukherjee, Indian politician, 13th President of India (d. 2020)
- December 14
  - Lee Remick, American actress (d. 1991)
  - Lewis Arquette, American film actor, writer and producer (d. 2001)
- December 15 – Adnan Badran, Prime Minister of Jordan
- December 21 – John G. Avildsen, American film director (d. 2017)
- December 25 – Sadiq al-Mahdi, Prime Minister of Sudan (1966–67, 1986–89) (d. 2020)
- December 26 – Gnassingbé Eyadéma, President of Togo (d. 2005)
- December 30
  - Omar Bongo, President of Gabon (d. 2009)
  - Sandy Koufax, American baseball player
- December 31 – King Salman of Saudi Arabia (official birth date)

== Deaths ==
=== January ===
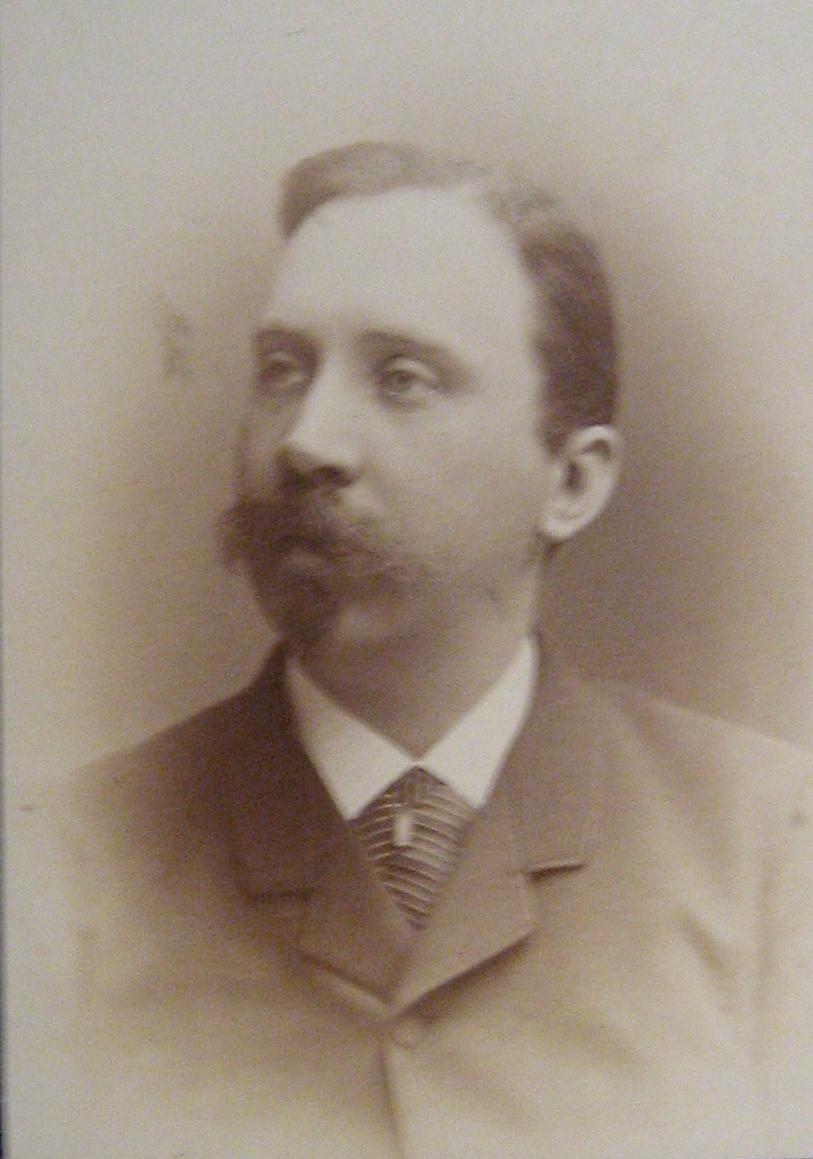
Johan Ramstedt

- January – Józef Białynia Chołodecki, Polish historian (b. 1852)
- January 10 – Edwin Flack, Australian Olympic athlete (b. 1873)
- January 16 – Ma Barker, American criminal (b. 1873)
- January 19 – Lloyd Hamilton, American actor (b. 1899)
- January 24
  - Constantin Dumitrescu, Romanian general (b. 1868)
  - Thomas Stevens, English cyclist (b. 1854)
- January 28 – Mikhail Ippolitov-Ivanov, Russian composer (b. 1859)

=== February ===
- February 3 – Hugo Junkers, German industrialist and aircraft designer (b. 1859)
- February 5 – George Edwin Patey, British admiral (b. 1859)
- February 7 – Herbert Ponting, English photographer and explorer (b. 1870)
- February 8 – Max Liebermann, German painter (b. 1847)
- February 13 – Ali of Hejaz, former King of Hejaz and Grand Sharif of Mecca (b. 1879)
- February 25 – Gerhard Louis De Geer, 17th Prime Minister of Sweden (b. 1854)
- February 26 – Liborius Ritter von Frank, Austro-Hungarian general (b. 1848)
- February 28 – Chiquinha Gonzaga, Brazilian composer (b. 1847)

=== March ===
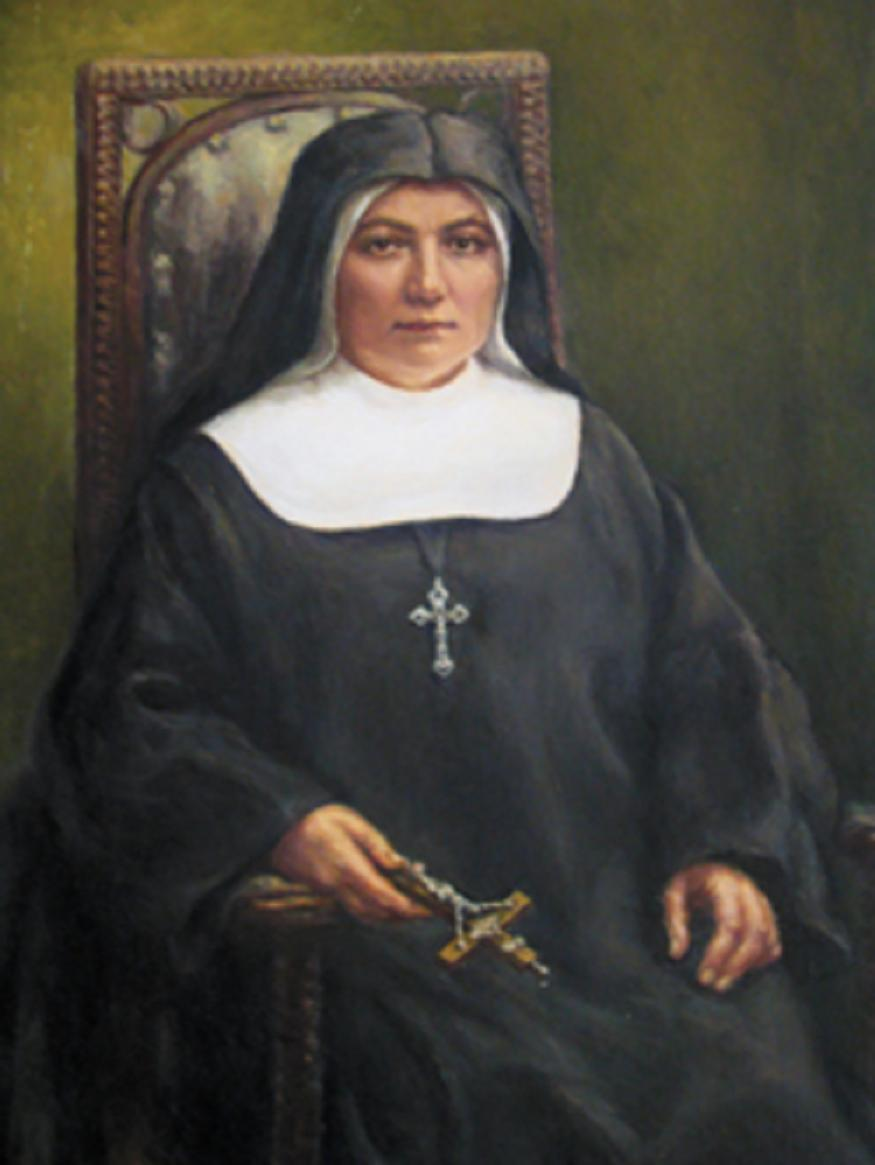
Blessed Maria Karłowska

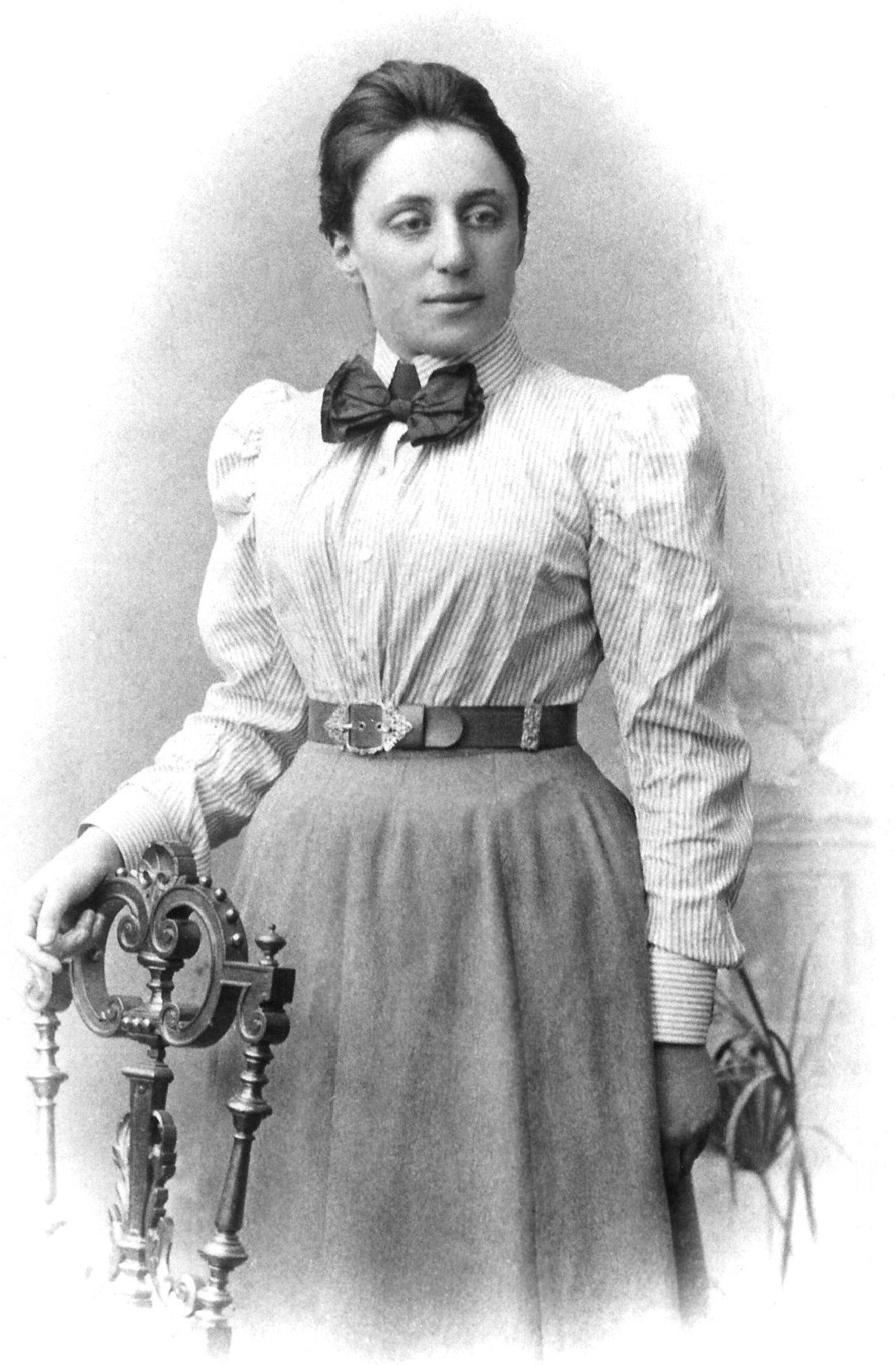
Emmy Noether

- March 6
  - Oliver Wendell Holmes Jr., U.S. Supreme Court Justice (b. 1841)
  - Baron Max Hussarek von Heinlein, former Prime Minister of Austria (b. 1865)
- March 7 – Leonid Feodorov, Soviet Orthodox priest and saint (b. 1879)
- March 15 – Johan Ramstedt, 9th Prime Minister of Sweden (b. 1852)
- March 16 – John Macleod, Scottish-born physician and physiologist, Nobel Prize laureate (b. 1876)
- March 22 – Aleksandër Moisiu, Albanian actor (b. 1879)
- March 23 – Florence Moore, American actress (b. 1886)
- March 24 – Maria Karłowska, Polish Roman Catholic religious professed and blessed (b. 1865)
- March 29 – Sir Edward Albert Sharpey-Schafer, English physiologist, pioneer in endocrinology (b. 1850)

=== April ===
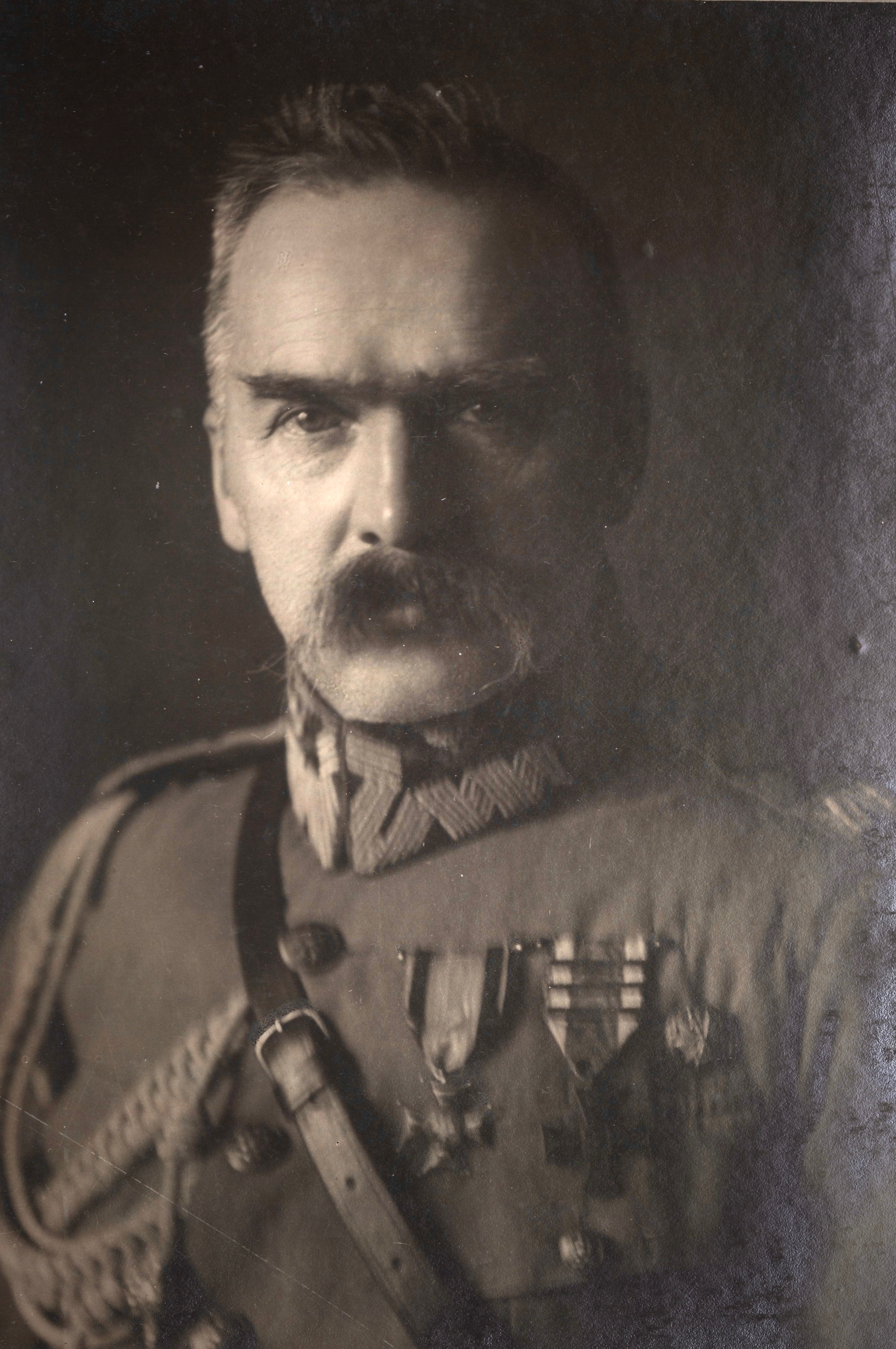
Józef Piłsudski

- April 2 – Bennie Moten, American jazz pianist (b. 1894)
- April 5 – Basil Champneys, English architect (b. 1842)
- April 6 – Edwin Arlington Robinson, American poet (b. 1869)
- April 8 – Adolph Ochs, American newspaper publisher (b. 1858)
- April 14 – Emmy Noether, German mathematician (b. 1882)
- April 15 – Anna Ancher, Danish painter (b. 1859)
- April 16 – Panait Istrati, Romanian writer (b. 1884)
- April 20 – Lucy, Lady Duff-Gordon, British fashion designer (b. 1863)
- April 24 – Anastasios Papoulas, Greek general (b. 1857)

=== May ===
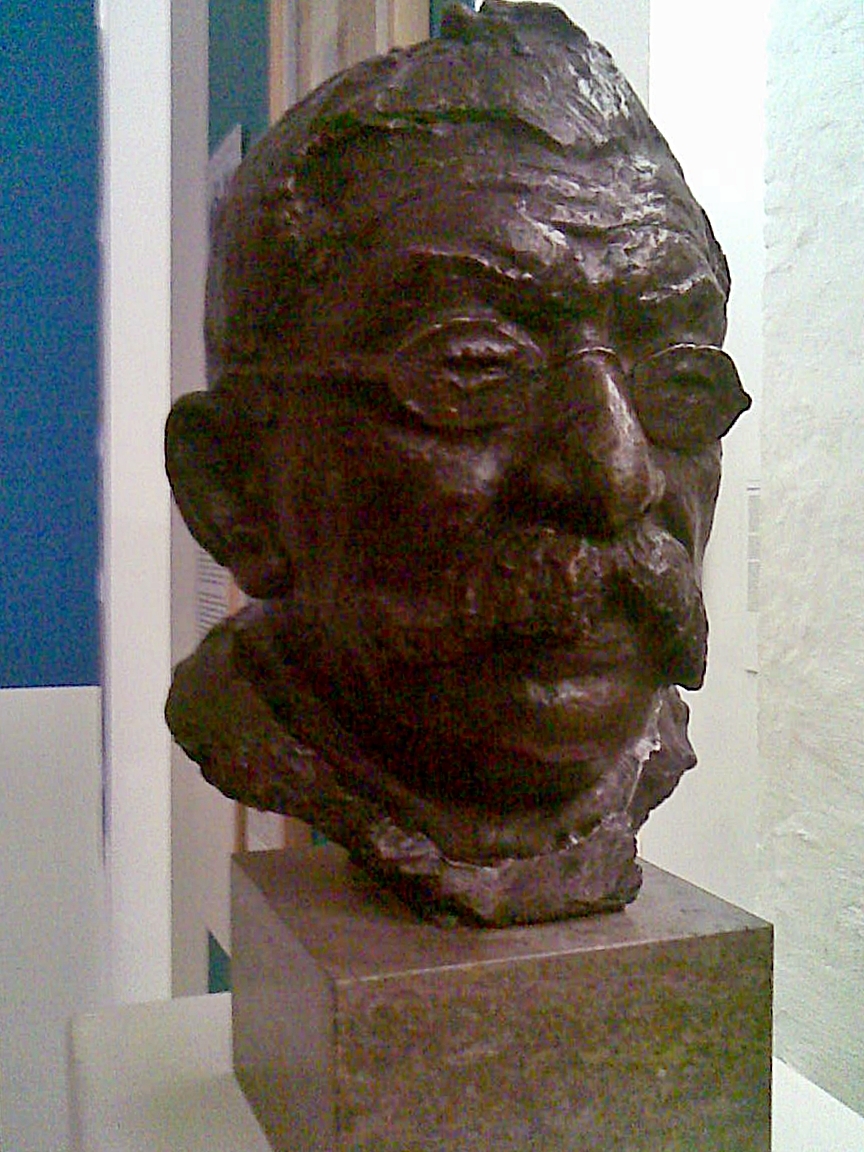
Magnus Hirschfeld

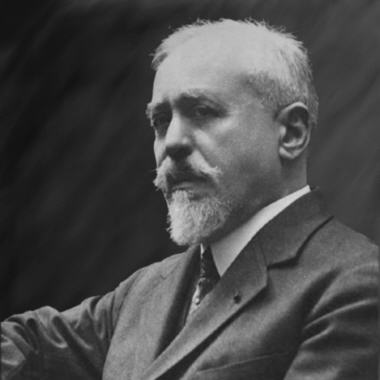
Paul Dukas

- May 1 – Antero Rubín, Spanish general, politician (b. 1851)
- May 4 – Junior Durkin, American actor (b. 1915)
- May 9 – Johnny Loftus, American boxing coach and trainer (b. 1874)
- May 12 – Józef Piłsudski, Polish politician, 2-time Prime Minister of Poland (b. 1867)
- May 14 – Magnus Hirschfeld, German sex researcher, gay rights advocate (b. 1868)
- May 15 – Kazimir Malevich, Polish-Russian painter, art theoretician (b. 1879)
- May 17
  - Paul Dukas, French composer (b. 1865)
  - Antonia Mesina, Italian Roman Catholic laywoman, martyr and blessed (b. 1919)
- May 19 – T. E. Lawrence (Lawrence of Arabia), English soldier, diplomat and writer (b. 1888)
- May 21
  - Jane Addams, American social worker, recipient of the Nobel Peace Prize (b. 1860)
  - Hugo de Vries, Dutch botanist and geneticist (b. 1848)
- May 22 – Pa-Trang-Loeng, Mnong mastermind behind the 1912-1935 Ethnic Rebellion of Cambodia (b. 1860)
- May 29 – Josef Suk, Czech composer, and violinist (b. 1874)

=== June ===
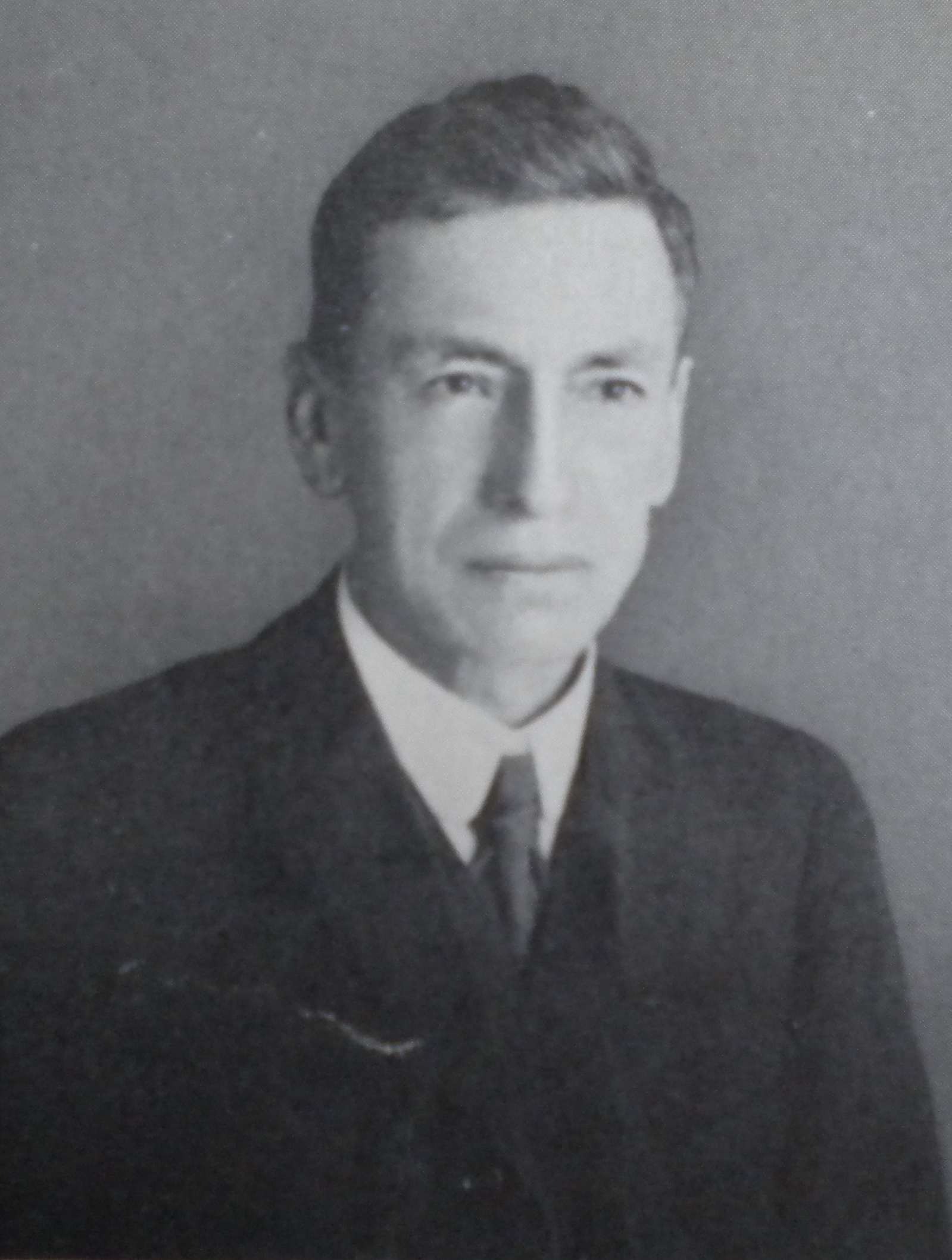
Daniel Salamanca Urey

- June 5 – Alexander von Linsingen, German general (b. 1850)
- June 6
  - Julian Byng, 1st Viscount Byng of Vimy, British general, 12th Governor General of Canada (b. 1862)
  - George Grossmith Jr., British actor (b. 1874)
- June 23 – Birdie Blye, American pianist (b. 1871)
- June 24 – Carlos Gardel, Argentine tango songwriter (b. 1890)

=== July ===
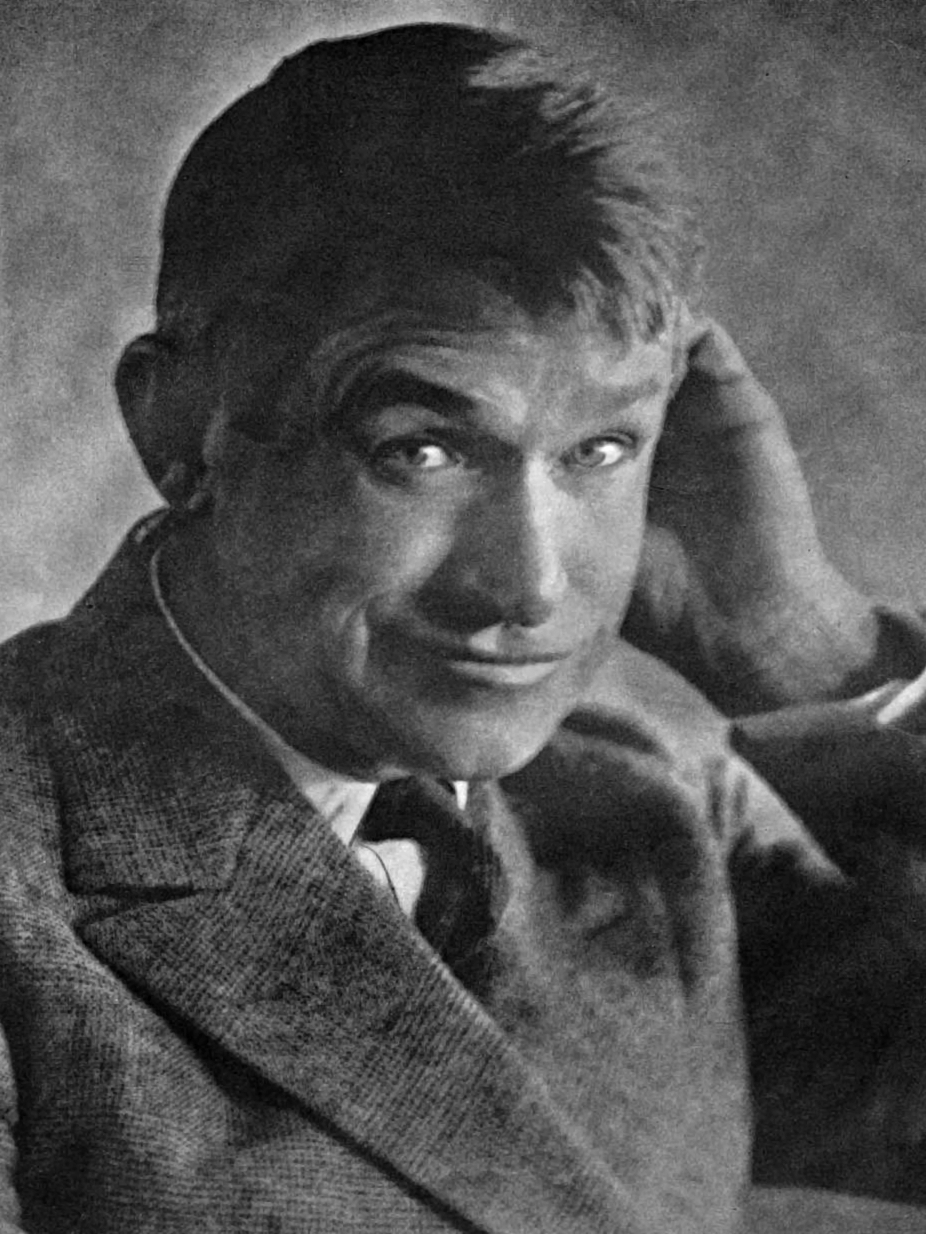
Will Rogers

- July 1 – Arthur Arz von Straußenburg, Austro-Hungarian general (b. 1857)
- July 3 – André Citroën, French automobile pioneer (b. 1878)
- July 9 – Daniel Edward Howard, 16th president of Liberia (b. 1861)
- July 12 – Alfred Dreyfus, French military officer, subject of the Dreyfus affair (b. 1859)
- July 15 – Pieter Cort van der Linden, Dutch politician (b. 1846)
- July 17
  - Cudjoe Lewis (Oluale Kossola), the last known surviving male victim of Clotilda, the last ship of the Atlantic slave trade (born c. 1841)
  - James Moore, English winner of the first ever cycle race (b. 1849)
  - George William Russell, Irish nationalist, poet and artist (b. 1867)
  - Daniel Salamanca Urey, 33rd President of Bolivia (b. 1869)
- July 22 – Laura M. Johns, American suffragist, journalist (b. 1849)
- July 28 – Meletius IV of Constantinople, Greek Patriarch of Alexandria (b. 1871)
- July 31 – Gustav Lindenthal, Czech civil engineer and bridge designer (b. 1850)

=== August ===
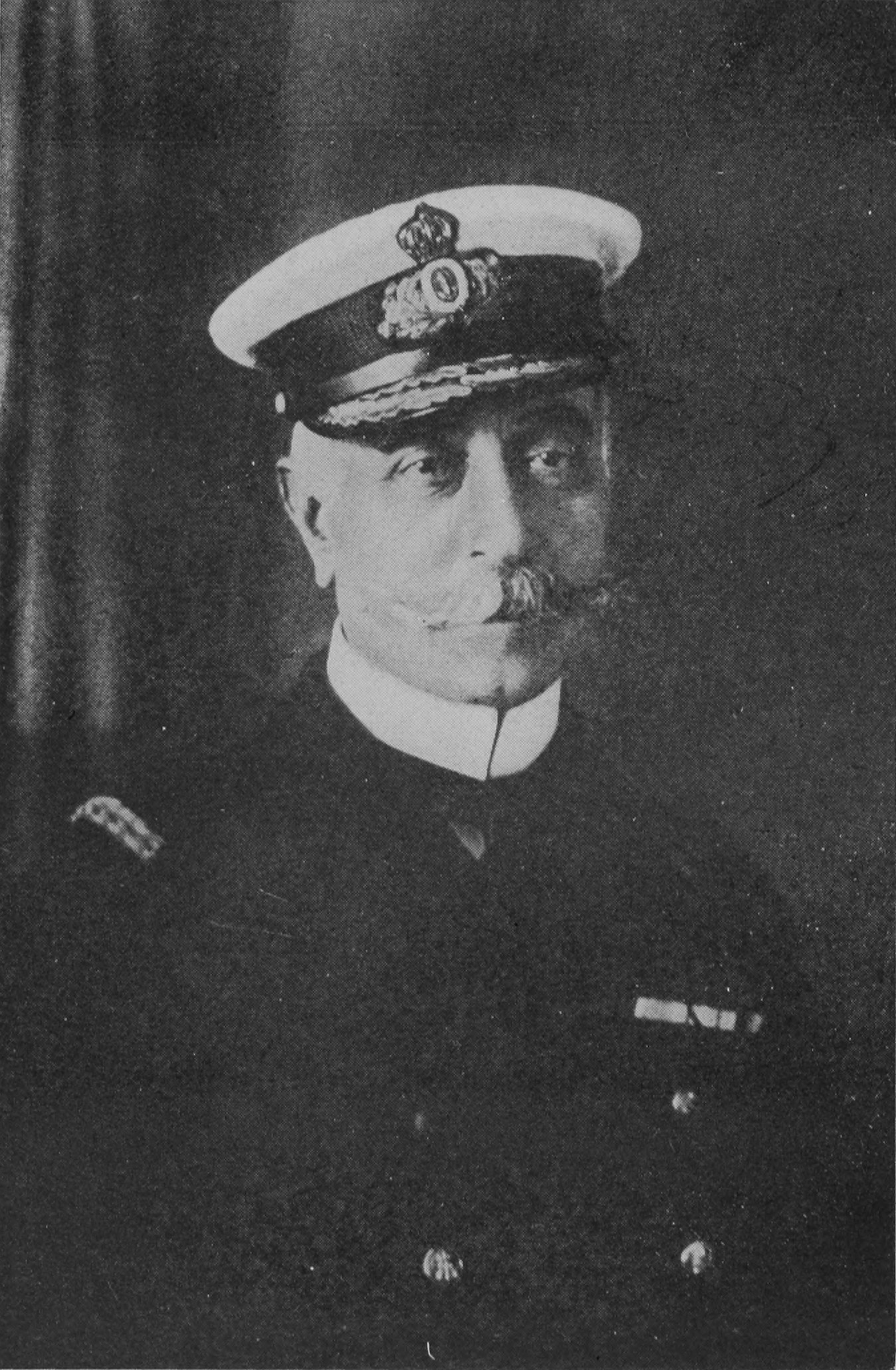
Pavlos Kountouriotis

- August 12 – Gareth Jones, Welsh journalist (b. 1905)
- August 14 – Léonce Perret, French film actor and producer (b. 1880)
- August 15
  - Paul Signac, French painter (b. 1863)
  - Wiley Post, American pilot (b. 1898)
  - Will Rogers, American humorist and actor (b. 1879)
- August 17 – Charlotte Perkins Gilman, American feminist and writer (b. 1860)
- August 20 – Edith Roberts, American actress (b. 1899)
- August 21 – John Hartley, English tennis player, double winner of Wimbledon (b. 1849)
- August 22
  - Frantz Jourdain, Belgian architect (b. 1847)
  - Pavlos Kountouriotis, Greek admiral, 1st President of Greece (b. 1855)
- August 25 – Mack Swain, American actor (b. 1876)
- August 27 – Childe Hassam, American painter (b. 1859)
- August 29 – Queen Astrid of Belgium (b. 1905)
- August 30 – Henri Barbusse, French novelist and journalist (b. 1873)

=== September ===
- September 8
  - Takejirō Tokonami, Japanese politician, Home Minister, Railway Minister and Minister of Communication (b. 1867)
  - Carl Weiss, American physician and murderer of Huey Long (b. 1906)
- September 10 – Huey Long, American politician (assassinated 2 days before) (b. 1893)
- September 19
  - Jules Cambon, French diplomat (b. 1845)
  - Konstantin Tsiolkovsky, Russian rocket scientist (b. 1857)
- September 23 – DeWolf Hopper, American actor, comedian (b. 1858)
- September 28 – William Kennedy Dickson, Scottish inventor, cinema pioneer and film director (b. 1860)

=== October ===
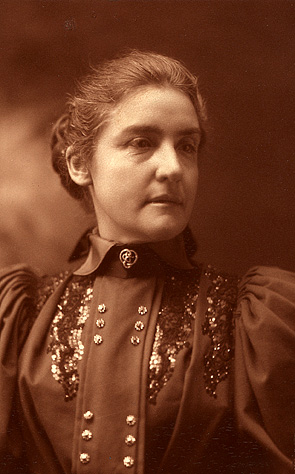
M. Carey Thomas

- October 1 – Grigore C. Crăiniceanu, Romanian general and politician (b. 1852)
- October 19 – Maria Cederschiöld, Swedish journalist and women's rights activist (b. 1856)
- October 20 – Arthur Henderson, Scottish politician, recipient of the Nobel Peace Prize (b. 1863)
- October 22 – Edward Carson, Baron Carson, Irish lawyer and politician (b. 1854)
- October 23 – Charles Demuth, American artist (b. 1883)

=== November ===
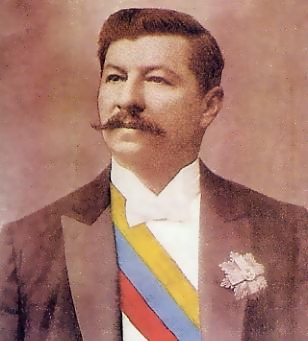
Juan Vicente Gómez

- November 2 – Jock Cameron, South African cricketer (b. 1905)
- November 6 – Henry Fairfield Osborn, American geologist, paleontologist and eugenist (b. 1857)
- November 7 – Charles Debbas, 1st President and 5th Prime Minister of Lebanon (b. 1885)
- November 8 – Sir Charles Kingsford Smith, Australian aviator (b. 1897)
- November 20 – John Jellicoe, 1st Earl Jellicoe, British admiral (b. 1859)
- November 21 – Agnes Pockels, German chemist (b. 1862)
- November 25 – Lij Iyasu of Ethiopia, deposed Emperor (b. 1895)
- November 28 – Erich von Hornbostel, Austrian musicologist (b. 1877)
- November 30 – Fernando Pessoa, Portuguese writer (b. 1888)

=== December ===
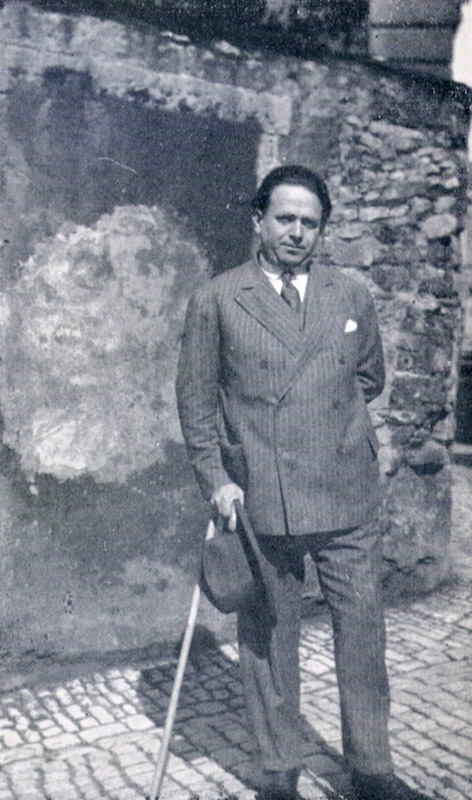
Kurt Tucholsky

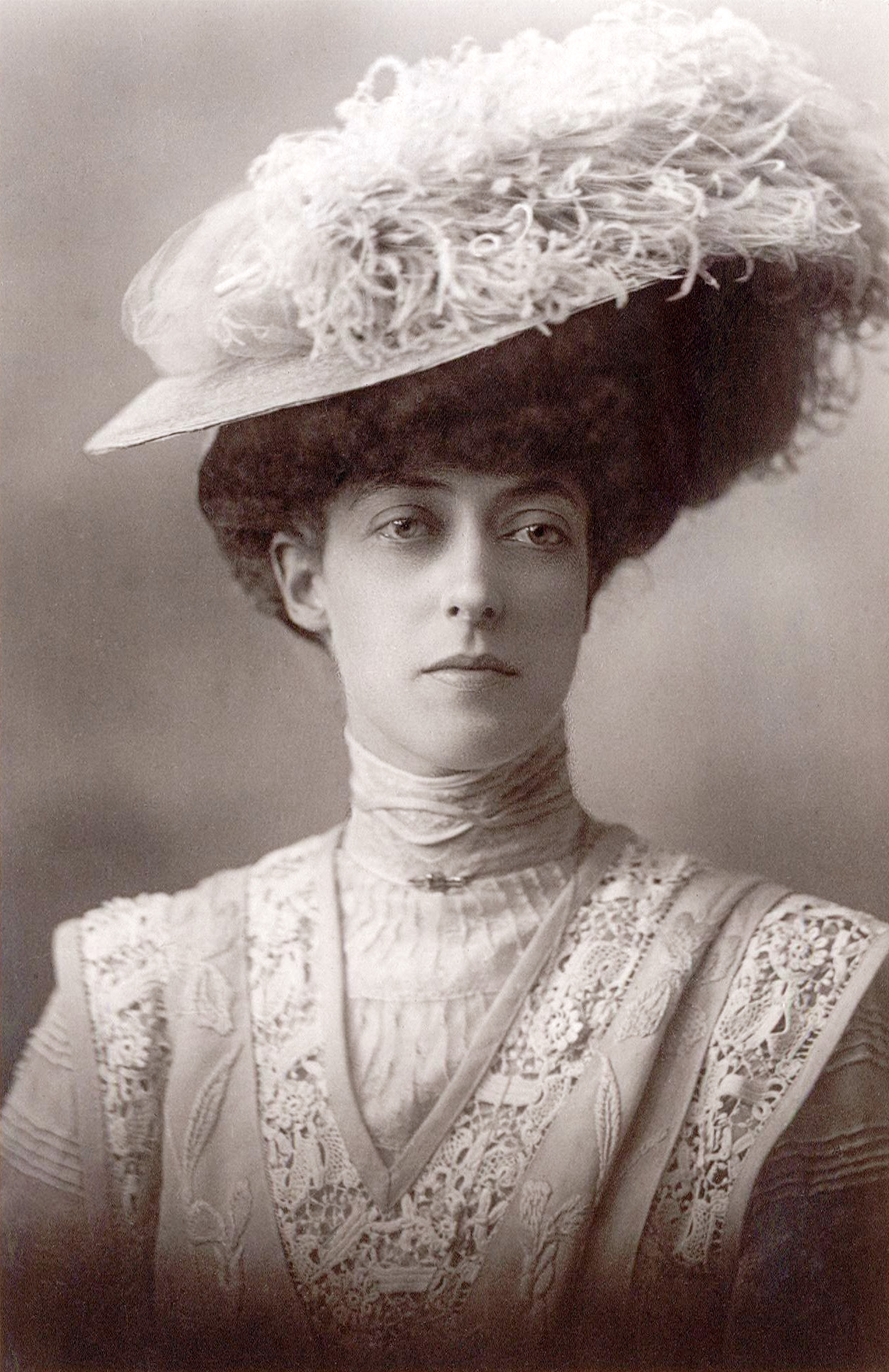
Princess Victoria

- December 1 – Bernhard Schmidt, Estonian optician and inventor (b. 1879)
- December 2 – James Henry Breasted, American Egyptologist (b. 1865)
- December 3 – Princess Victoria of the United Kingdom, daughter of King Edward VII and younger sister of King George V (b. 1868)
- December 4
  - Johan Halvorsen, Norwegian composer (b. 1864)
  - Charles Richet, French physiologist, Nobel Prize laureate (b. 1850)
- December 13 – Victor Grignard, French chemist, Nobel Prize laureate (b. 1871)
- December 14 – Stanley G. Weinbaum, American science-fiction author (b. 1902)
- December 16 – Thelma Todd, American actress (b. 1906)
- December 17 – Juan Vicente Gómez, Venezuelan military dictator, 3-time President of Venezuela (b. 1857)
- December 21 – Kurt Tucholsky, German journalist and satirist (b. 1890)
- December 24 – Alban Berg, Austrian composer (b. 1885)
- December 29 – Photios II of Constantinople, Ecumenical Patriarch of Constantinople (b. 1874)

== Nobel Prizes ==

- Physics – James Chadwick
- Chemistry – Frédéric Joliot, Irène Joliot-Curie ("in recognition of their synthesis of new radioactive elements")
- Physiology or Medicine – Hans Spemann
- Literature – not awarded
- Peace – Carl von Ossietzky

== Sources ==
- Eames, Tom (May 20, 2022a). "Who was Elvis Presley's father Vernon and what happened to him after his son's death?". Smooth Radio. Archived from the original on November 6, 2023.
- Eames, Tom (May 20, 2022b). "Who was Elvis Presley's mother Gladys? The heartbreaking story behind her life and death". Smooth Radio. Archived from the original on November 6, 2023.
