= Prashant Kumar Bundela =

Indian fighter pilot (1970–2002)

Squadron Leader Prashant Kumar Bundela (14 December 1970 – 19 August 2002) was a fighter pilot of the Indian Air Force who shot down a Pakistan Navy Breguet Atlantic over the Rann of Kutch in what is known as the Altantique Incident. He received the prestigious Vayusena medal for this operation on 26 January 2000. He died in 2002 in an aircraft crash.

== Early life ==
Bundela was born on 14 December 1970 in Jhunjhunu, Rajasthan. On 14 December 1991, he was commissioned in the fighter stream and posted to a squadron in the Western Sector.

== War Operations ==
10 August 1999, two IAF MiG-21 interceptor aircraft of No. 45 Squadron took off from the Naliya air base at 11:00 a.m. to investigate an unidentified aircraft at the Indian side of the border. They identified the intruder as a Pakistani Atlantique reconnaissance aircraft. After a series of maneuvers, they received clearance to shoot down the Pakistani plane. At 11:17 am IST, Bundela fired an infrared homing R-60 air-to-air missile which hit the engine on the port side of the plane causing it to burst into flames and crash in the Kori Creek wasteland.

== Death ==
On 4 April 2002, Bundela was on a sortie from Adampur to Halwara with Flight Lieutenant S.K. Nayak in a MiG-21 Bison. While over Jalandhar his aircraft began sputtering due to a lack of fuel being pumped into the R-25 engine and it started flaming. They both ejected, but Bundela landed on his neck while Nayak parachuted safely. He was paralyzed due to spinal injuries, after four months of struggling in the intensive care unit he died on 19 August 2002.
