= Ludhiana Airport =

Airport of Punjab, India

- IATA: LUH; ICAO: VILD

Summary
- Airport type: Public
- Owner: Government of Punjab
- Operator: Airports Authority of India
- Serves: Ludhiana
- Location: Sahnewal, Ludhiana district, Punjab, India
- Elevation AMSL: 254 m (833 ft)
- Coordinates: 30°51′17″N 075°57′09″E
- Website: Ludhiana Airport

Map
- Location of airport in Punjab LUH (India)

Runways
Direction	Length		Surface
Direction	m	ft	Surface
12/30	1,463	4,800	Asphalt

Statistics (April 2025 - March 2026)
- Passengers: 628 (▼ -68.6%)
- Aircraft movements: 218 (▼ -46%)
- Cargo tonnage: —
- Source: AAI

Ludhiana Airport (IATA: LUH, ICAO: VILD) is a domestic airport serving the city of Ludhiana in Punjab, India. It is located near the town of Sahnewal, 12 km (7.5 mi) south-east of Ludhiana on the Grand Trunk Road. There is a flight training club based in the airport.

== Development ==
The airport was mainly used for government flights, air force exercises and training flights. The only commercial airline the airport had was Alliance Air, which connected it to Delhi with regular flights until April 2021, due to the COVID-19 pandemic. Since then, the airport remained closed, until when in September 2023, the low-cost regional carrier, FlyBig, restarted flight operations to Dehradun with a stopover at Ghaziabad on 6 September 2023, as part of the government's UDAN Scheme.

As the airport is too small to accommodate future traffic and demands, and due to zero scopes available to expand the airport because of urban growth around it, in 2019, the Ministry of Civil Aviation decided to build a passenger terminal at the existing Indian Air Force's base at Halwara, located 34 km (21 mi) south-west of Ludhiana. After its supposed time of completion in the end of 2023, the Sahnewal airport was to be closed for commercial operations.

However, due to multiple delays that hindered the opening of the new airport, as of April 2025, Sahnewal still continues to operate with the help of regular flights operated by FlyBig to Ghaziabad. The new airport is currently slated to be opened on 15 May 2025.

== Airlines and destinations ==
No destinations as of now

== See also ==
- List of airports in Punjab
- Ludhiana International Airport
