= Yunus Hussain =

Pakistani war hero (1935-1965)

Flight Lieutenant Yunus Hussain SJ
- یونس حسین
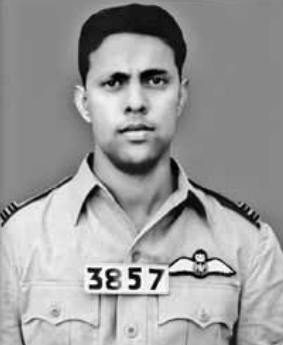

Personal details
- Born: Khawaja Yunus Hussain; 1 June 1935 Panipat, British Raj
- Died: 6 September 1965 (aged 30) Halwara, India
- Spouse: Surayya Jabeen (m. 1961; died 2021)
- Relations: Mushaf Ali Mir (brother-in-law)
- Children: 2
- Education: RPAF College; 157th Flying Instructors' School, USA
- Known for: Shooting down two IAF Hawker Hunters during the 1965 War

Military service
- Branch/service: Pakistan Air Force
- Years of service: 1958–1965
- Rank: Flight lieutenant
- Unit: No. 5 Squadron PAF
- Battles/wars: Bajaur Campaign; Indo-Pakistani War of 1965; Air war operations; Halwara Airstrikes †
- Awards: (2) Green Endorsements (Note: Award by the Commander-in-Chief for flying every 500 accident-free hours.); Tamgha-e-Diffa (1960-62); Sitara-e-Jurat (posthumously, 1965)
- Service number: PAK/3857

Flight Lieutenant Yunus Hussain (Note: Urdu: یونس حسین) (1 June 1935 — 6 September 1965) was a fighter pilot, aerobatic pilot, and Pakistan Air Force officer. He shot down two Hawker Hunter aircraft of the Indian Air Force, including one piloted by Flying Officer A.R. Gandhi over Halwara in the Indo-Pakistani Air War of 1965. Shortly after, Hussain was shot down in the same area by Flight Lieutenant Vinod Neb after mistakenly turning left into Neb's firing range. He is regarded as one of Pakistan's greatest war heroes.

Born in Haryana, Hussain grew up in a financially struggling household. As the only child of his parents, his early life was marked by hardship, particularly in accessing basic amenities, including education. After the Partition of British India in 1947, his family relocated to Jhang, where he enrolled at a high school and completed his matriculation. He was unable to continue further education due to financial constraints. To support himself, he took a job in Lahore but was reportedly restless and dissatisfied with it for years.

Seeking a different path, he applied to the RPAF Selection Centre in Lahore but was initially rejected for being overage. However, amid rising tensions between Pakistan and India, the Air Force temporarily relaxed its eligibility criteria for volunteers. He reapplied and was accepted into the RPAF College in 1956. Known for his intelligence and diligence, he rose to the position of Squadron Under Officer before being commissioned in 1958. He was twice awarded the Green Endorsement by Air Marshal Asghar Khan in recognition of his dedication to flying. His passion and skill enabled him to achieve the fastest completion of 500 and later 1,000 flying hours in the PAF. In the early 1960s, he participated in the Bajaur Campaign.

The PAF held an air show in honor of Air Marshal Omar Dhani of Indonesia in 1964. A key highlight was the F-86 Sabre formation display by the "Sabres Nine – 1964" team, which included Flight Lieutenant Hussain among its members.

The Tempest House at the PAF College Sargodha was renamed to Yunus House in 1967 and again on 26 March 2015 in his honour. In 2016, the Pakistan Air Force launched the Yunusabad project at PAF Base Samungli in his memory, with the aim to eliminate illiteracy and eradicate poverty in the rural areas of Balochistan.

In a December 2020 podcast, his colleague, retired Air Commodore Sajad Haider, said that Kaiser Tufail falsely told the Indian Air Force to credit Cecil Chaudhry instead of Hussain for Gandhi's plane getting shot down. (Note: The specified timestamps for reference are 16:25-18:10, 20:26-21:07, and 29:00-31:17 in the podcast.) Haider's Indian counterpart confirmed that Hussain had originally been credited before Tufail went to him. When Haider questioned Tufail on the lie, he said he wanted Cecil to be credited because Cecil was his senior. Haider also added that Cecil had been lying his whole life and claiming Yunus Hussain's success as his own for forty years. Further stating that the lie was concocted in order to glorify Sargodha pilots.

== Early life and education ==
Khawaja Yunus Hussain was born on 1 June 1935 in Panipat, 18 years after the marriage of his father, Khawaja Yusuf Hussain, a businessman. The only child of his parents, he had a very modest upbringing due to the families weak financial position. The early days of his life were stories of hardships and struggle for acquiring the basic of amenities of life, in particular education.

His family moved to Jhang after the Partition of British India in August 1947. He was enrolled into the Government High School Jhang City, where he completed his Matriculation examination. Afterwards, he did his Faculty of Science (FSc) from Multan. He was unable to continue further education and was forced to take a job in Lahore which during the early years he was restless and dissatisfied with his job. He eventually ended up at the PAF Selection Centre in Lahore but was rejected for being overage.

== Personal life ==
Yunus married Surayya Jabeen in 1961, the sister of Mushaf Ali Mir and oldest daughter of the Kashmiri family from Lahore. Their first child Sajad was born in 1962 and Fawad on 22 August 1965. The latter was 15 days old when his father died.

In their father's footsteps, they both joined the Pakistan Air Force. Sajad became an air defence controller and retired as an Air Commodore, while Fawad joined as an aeronautical engineer and retired as an Air Vice Marshal.

== Service years ==
=== Pakistan Air Force ===
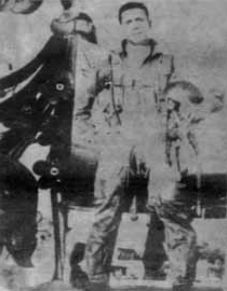
Yunus in his pilot gear, smiling for a picture, c. 1960

As tensions grew between Pakistan and India, the Royal Pakistan Air Force began asking for volunteers under slightly relaxed rules. Yunus once again applied and this time he was successful and joined the RPAF College in 1956.

Known as a brilliant and hardworking student, Yunus eventually became the Squadron Under Officer in his last year at the PAF College due to his "outstanding performance" during training. He was commissioned into the Pakistan Air Force (PAF) on 25 June 1958 as part of the 26 GD(P) course. He participated in the skirmishes of the Bajaur Campaign for which he was awarded the Tamgha-e-Diffa. Its noted that his performance in various service courses was always second to none, be it at the Fighter Leader's School, Mauripur or the F-104 Conversion Course.

On 27 October 1964, the PAF held an air show in Peshawar to honor Air Marshal Omar Dhani of the Indonesian Air Force as the chief guest. A special highlight of the event was the F-86 Sabre formation display by the "Sabres Nine – 1964" team, led by Wing Commander Anwar Shamim. The team included Squadron Leaders M. Arshad, Sarfaraz Ahmed Rafiqui, Mukhtar Ali, Muniruddin Ahmad, and M.M. Alam, along with Flight Lieutenants M. Masud Khalid, Yusaf A. Khan, and Yunus Hussain.

=== 1965 war and death ===
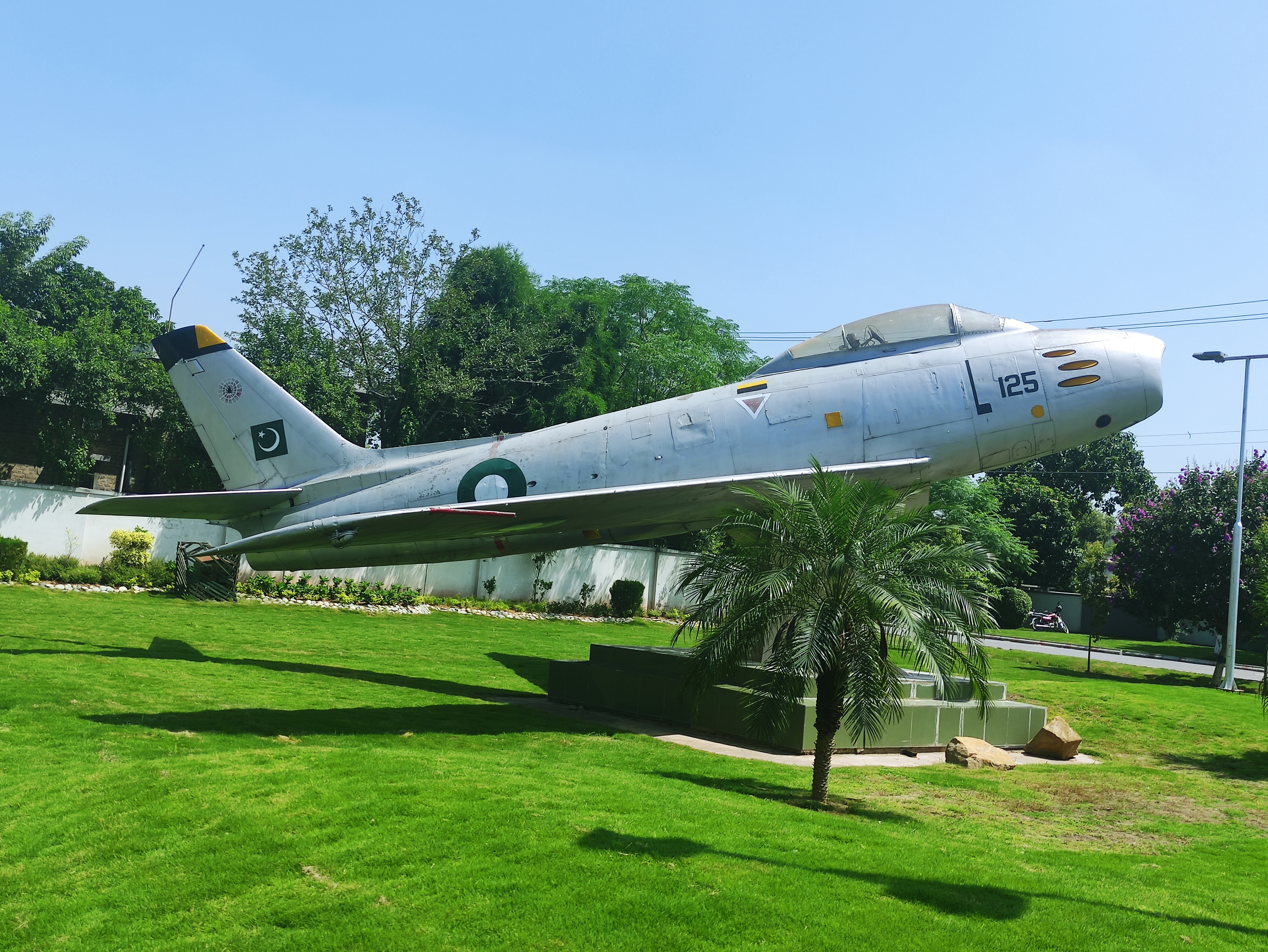
An F-86 Sabre similar to the one Yunus crashed in

At 1715 hours, Squadron Leader Sarfaraz Ahmed Rafiqui led a formation of 3 F-86 Sabres with Yunus Hussain as his No. 2 and Cecil Chaudhry as No. 3. The formation took off from PAF Station Sargodha heading towards Halwara. On the way there, they met up with MM Alam's formation who was returning from an aborted raid on the Adampur Air Force Station of the Indian Air Force. Alam informed them about his encounter (Note: Alam had shot down one of them, while the rest managed to escape) with four Indian Hawker Hunters over Tarn Taran.

Rafiqui's formation continued on and reached the Halwara base in the evening, where the remaining three Hawker Hunters were taxiing after landing. Just as Rafiqui was positioning himself for a strafing run, two IAF Hunters (flown by F/O P.S. Pingale and A. R. Gandhi) on Combat Air Patrol intercepted his formation. Cecil Chaudhry fled back to base leaving Rafiquis tail exposed and Yunus alone. Rafiqui quickly aborted his strafing run and engaged Pingale. He manoeuvered behind the Hunter and shot it down. Yunus shot A.R. Gandhi destroying his Hawker Hunter but Gandhi ejected and landed on the outskirts of Halwara. After this, Vinod Neb shot down Yunus when he mistakenly turned to the left directly into the firing range of Neb.

== Sitara-e-Jurat ==
The Sitara-e-Jurat citation reads:

CITATION
FLIGHT LIEUTENANT YUNUS HUSSAIN (PAK/3857)

"Flt Lt Yunus fought in air battle over enemy territory aggressively, fearlessly and with great professional skill. On 6 Sep while attacking Halwara airfield, a large number of enemy aircraft intercepted his small formation. He fought them with exceptional gallantry exceeding all limits and in the process shot down two Hunters. Although his aircraft was hit, he refused to break off engagement in complete disregard to his personal safety. He became a symbol of courage and professional ability for the other pilots. For his valour, professional skill and devotion to duty; he is awarded SJ."

== Awards and decorations ==
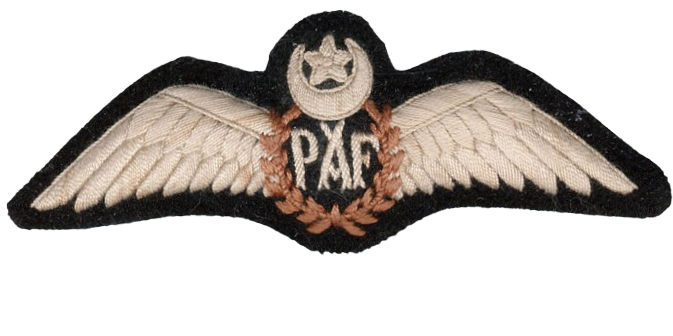

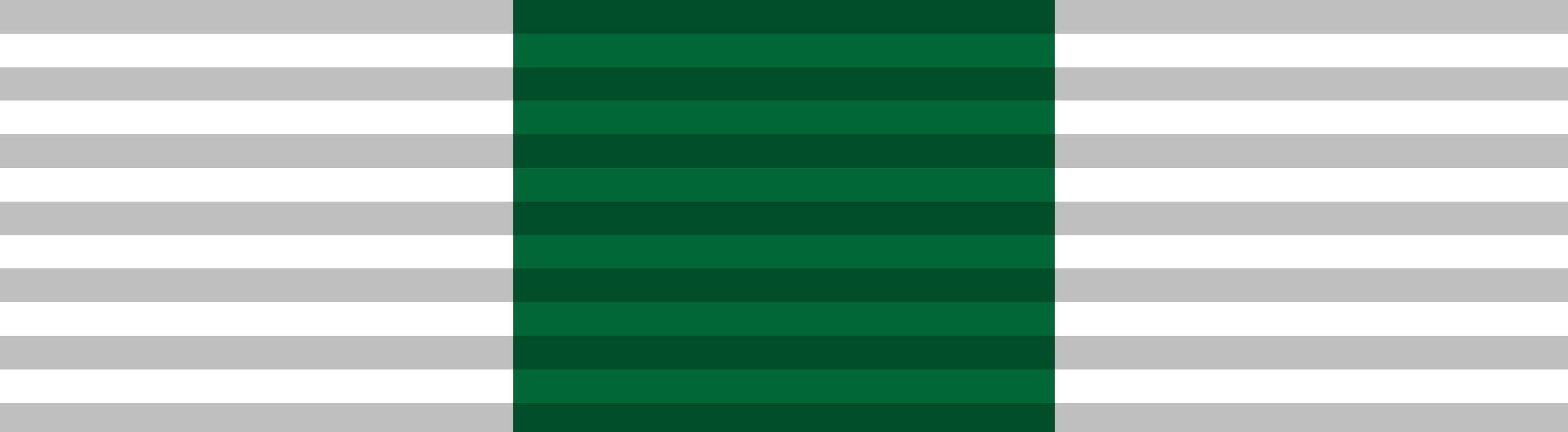

PAF GD(P) Badge
Sitara-e-Jurat (Star of Courage) POSTHUMOUS	Tamgha-e-Diffa (Defence Medal) DIR-BAJAUR Clasp
