= MM Alam =

Pakistani fighter pilot (1935–2013)

M. M. Alam SJ & Bar (Note: "Bar" refers to a second award of the same honour.) SI(M)
- ایم ایم عالم
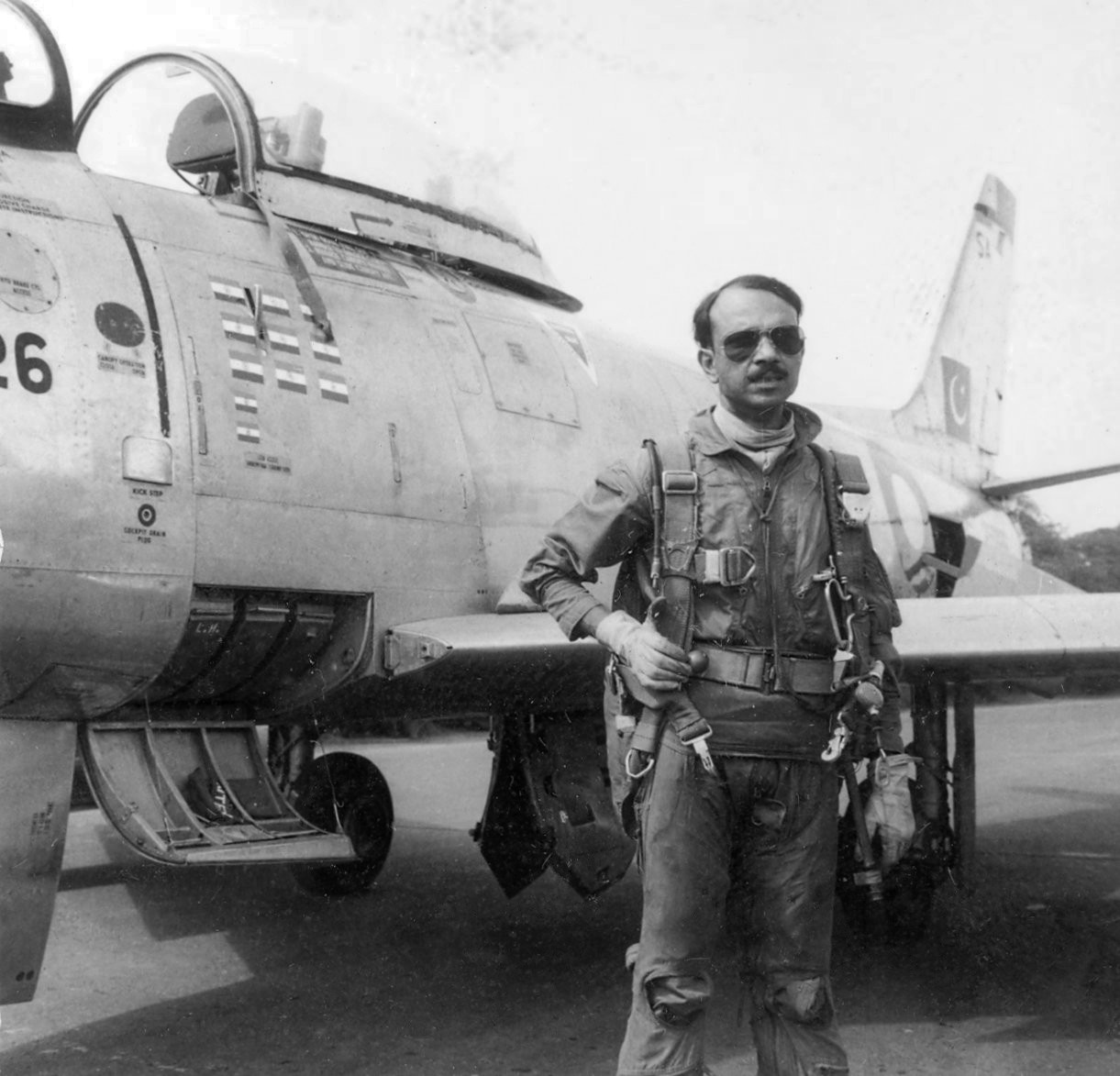
- Alam poses with his F-86 Sabre, (Note: Large Indian flags mark confirmed kills, smaller indicate probable/damaged.) 1965
- Born: 6 July 1935; Calcutta, Bengal Presidency
- Died: 18 March 2013 (aged 77); PNS Shifa Hospital, Karachi, Pakistan
- Military career
- Branch: Pakistan Air Force; Syrian Air Force
- Service years: 1953–1982
- Rank: Air Commodore
- Nicknames: Little Dragon; Peanut Alam
- Commands: No. 11 Squadron PAF; No. 5 Squadron PAF; No. 26 Squadron PAF
- Conflicts: Indo-Pakistani War of 1965; Indo-Pakistani air war of 1965; 1973 Arab–Israeli War; Soviet–Afghan War (advisory role)
- Awards: See list

Personal details
- Resting place: PAF Base Masroor, Pakistan
- Relatives: Mohammad Shahid Alam (brother); Mohammad Sajjad Alam (brother)
- Education: RPAF College; PAF Staff College; Royal College of Defence Studies
- Known for: Setting a world record by downing five Hawker Hunters in under 30 seconds, becoming an ace in a day on 6 September during the 1965 War (disputed) (Note: See disputed record for further details.)

Muhammad Mahmood Alam (Note: Urdu: محمد محمود عالم) (6 July 1935 — 18 March 2013) best known as M. M. Alam and affectionately nicknamed Little Dragon and Peanut Alam, (Note: Earned the nickname because he was "small and cute".) was a Pakistani flying ace, war hero, and a former one-star rank officer in the Pakistan Air Force.

Born in Calcutta, Alam became interested in aviation after witnessing RAF pilots defend his hometown during World War II. During the 1946 Bihar riots, he killed someone in act of self defence at the age of 11. He supported the Pakistan Movement and moved to East Bengal after the Partition in 1947. He joined the RPAF College in 1952 and was commissioned into the Air Force in 1953. Thereafter, he was attached to its first jet unit, the No. 11 Sqn, where he eventually became the top-scorer of the Air Force in air-to-air gunnery competitions.

Patrolling over Sargodha during the Indo-Pakistani air war of 1965 on 7 September, Squadron Leader Alam set a world combat record of shooting down five Indian Hawker Hunters with his F-86 Sabre in less than a minute which earned him the designation of 'ace in a day', making him the only known jet pilot to achieve such a feat.

However, the claim has been disputed by the official history of the PAF, former colleague Sajad Haider, and historians who attributed the account to the fog of war. Nonetheless, Haider and Indian historian Pushpindar Singh credit Alam with two confirmed kills on that day. By the end of the war, he was credited with 9 total air kills, two aircraft damaged, and was awarded the Sitara-i-Jurat & Bar.

Promoted to Wing Commander in 1967, he was appointed Officer Commanding No. 5 Sqn and oversaw the induction of newly acquired Dassault Mirage III aircraft, which he and his pilots ferried from France to Pakistan in 1968.

In the early 1970s, he was deputed to Syria at the request of the Syrian government to train their pilots. After the 1971 War broke out, resulting in the secession of East Pakistan and the creation of Bangladesh, he became depressed. He did not report for duty for months and refused to accept his salary, as he believed he hadn't earned it. He led a group of 16 PAF pilots and flew combat missions against the Israeli Air Force in the 1973 Arab-Israeli War and then commanded a Syrian squadron of MiG-21s.

As a student at the Royal College of Defence Studies in 1980, officials issued a report comparing him to Field Marshal William Slim. In 1981, as Assistant Chief of Air Staff (Plans), he advocated for the acquisition of F-16 fighter jets in a briefing to President General Zia-ul-Haq, challenging the position of his own Air Chief, Anwar Shamim.

That year, concerned by damaging allegations to the PAF's integrity, including that Air Chief Anwar Shamim had reportedly purchased a ranch in the United States for $500,000, Alam advised him to investigate the rumors and lay them to rest. Described as the "blue-eyed boy" of the military regime, Shamim was offended that Alam even advised him and submitted a report to the Ministry of Defence, questioning his integrity instead. Alam petitioned President General Zia-ul-Haq, but with Zia firmly in Shamim's corner, his request was ignored, and he was prematurely retired in 1982. In protest, Alam refused his pension. In an attempt to appease him, General Zia offered him a diplomatic posting and the chairmanship of a thinktank, both of which he rejected.

Alam had gradually embraced religion in the later years of his career and adopted a nomadic lifestyle afterward. He disappeared and it was eventually discovered that he had joined the Afghan Mujahideen to fight against the occupying Soviet army in Afghanistan and became close to Ahmad Shah Massoud.

He later lived in a Mess and faced financial hardship as a result of refusing his pension. By 2002, Air Chief Marshal Mushaf Ali Mir had a guesthouse built for him in Chaklala and convinced him to finally accept his pension. He lived there until the mid-2000s, when he was advised to temporarily move to PAF Base Faisal, though he intended to return, repeated delays kept him there and he eventually settled in. At the age of 77, he died in early 2013 due to complications as a result of his smoking habits.

== Early life ==
Muhammad Mahmood Alam was born on 6 July 1935 in Calcutta in a Bihari family of civil servants that spoke Urdu. (Note: There is a common misconception that he was ethnically Bengali because he was born in the Bengal Presidency, but he was in fact Bihari.) His father was Muhammad Masood Alam. According to banker Mohammad Badrul Ahsan, Mahmood Alam claimed that he was a Bengali at heart.

Alam supported the Pakistan Movement and Muhammad Ali Jinnah. Following the Partition of British India in 1947, the family migrated to East Bengal, Pakistan. In the events leading up to partition, he said that he had killed someone in self defence at the age of 11 during the 1946 Bihar riots.

He became an aviation enthusiast after witnessing Japanese fighter planes attacking his hometown of Calcutta during World War II, forcing the Royal Air Force (RAF) to defend. He recalled seeing a celebratory banner raised by people in Calcutta in honour of RAF pilot Maurice Pring, who shot down three enemy planes. The banner read "Pring prongs 3," a phrase that Alam said "really caught my imagination". At the age of 14, he often built model airplanes out of wood.

He completed his secondary education at Government High School in Dacca, where he was a member of the Shaheen Air Training Corps (SATC) under the instruction of Polish pilot Flight Lieutenant Muchowski. As a student at the school, Alam trained with the SATC and earned his coveted glider wings during the graduation parade in Quetta.

== Personal life ==
His brothers include Professor Mohammad Shahid Alam, an economist at Northeastern University, and Dr. Mohammad Sajjad Alam, a particle physicist and former professor at the University at Albany, SUNY. The family moved from East Pakistan to Karachi after the Bangladesh Liberation War in 1971.

Muhammad Mahmood Alam remained a lifelong bachelor, as the responsibility of raising his younger siblings after his father's death left him with little opportunity to marry. According to his friend, Air Marshal (R) Riaz Uddin Shaikh, while Alam was in Afghanistan during the Soviet-Afghan War, he became infatuated with the idea of marrying an Afghan woman he had met or encountered there, and he held onto the hope that she would eventually come to Pakistan. Another person, whose father was a friend of Alam, recalled asking him why he had chosen not to marry. Alam replied: "I'm not against marriage; it's just that when you are young you think that life is in your hands, but life is bigger. Someone once said all that is desirable is not attainable — indeed, all that is desirable is often not worth attaining."

An avid reader, he had a personal library of over 3,000 books.

== Service years ==
Alam trained at the Joint Services Pre-Cadet Training School in Quetta, alongside Ahmad Tasnim, who would later become a Vice Admiral in the Pakistan Navy. Following six months of training, Flight Cadet Alam joined the RPAF College in 1952.

He was commissioned into the Royal Pakistan Air Force on 2 October 1953, as part of the 15th GD(P) course. Soon after, he completed the Fighter Conversion Course at the PAF Station Mauripur, emerged as a top class fighter pilot, and was the top-scorer of the Air Force in air-to-air gunnery competitions. Sometime later, he had flown the Hawker Hunter while on attachment with the Royal Air Force.

On 27 October 1964, the PAF held an air show in Peshawar in honour of Indonesian Air Marshal Omar Dhani. Among those who performed were the F-86 Sabre formation of the "Sabres Nine – 1964" team, led by Wing Commander Anwar Shamim. The team consisted of Squadron Leaders M Arshad, Sarfraz Rafiqui, Mukhtar Ali, Muniruddin Ahmad, MM Alam, and Flight Lieutenants M Masud Khalid, Yusaf A Khan, and Yunus Hussain.

=== 1965 War ===
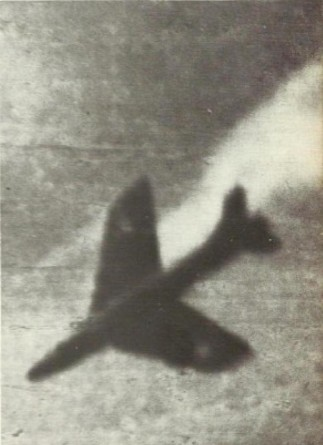
Photograph taken from the gun camera of Squadron Leader MM Alam shows an IAF Hunter aircraft plummeting to the ground in flames after its wing tanks ruptured following a brief burst of 0.5-inch Browning machine-gun fire by Sqn Ldr Alam, 1965.

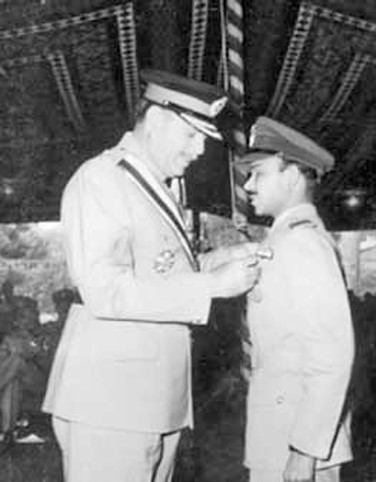
Field Marshal Ayub Khan pins the Sitara-i-Jurat on Squadron Leader MM Alam, 1966

Flying in a formation of three F-86 Sabres, Squadron Leader MM Alam shot down one Hawker Hunter of the Indian Air Force (IAF), flown by Squadron Leader AK Rawlley, (Note: Brother of Lt. General N. C. Rawlley.) over Halwara Air Force Station on 6 September 1965, in a dusk attack by the PAF. At 1715 hours, Squadron Leader Sarfraz Rafiqui led a formation of 3 F-86 Sabres with Yunus Hussain as his No. 2 and Cecil Chaudhry as No. 3. The formation took off from PAF Station Sargodha heading towards Halwara. On the way there, they met up with Alam's formation who was returning from an aborted raid on the Adampur Air Force Station of the IAF. Alam informed them about his encounter with four Indian Hawker Hunters over Tarn Taran.

On 7 September, while flying a Combat Air Patrol mission over Sargodha with his wingman Flying Officer Masud Akhtar, Squadron Leader Alam stated that they encountered five IAF Hawker Hunters who were part of the Strike No. 4 of that day. Alam and the PAF claimed that he had shot down all five.

The Indian pilots who were said to have been shot down by Alam were Squadron Leaders Onkar Nath Kacker and A B Devayya, Flight Lieutenant Guha, Flying Officer Brar, and Squadron Leader Bhagwat. However, this is incorrect, because all five pilots flew on separate strike missions against Sargodha at different times that day. Devayya was part of Strike No. 1 which was undertaken early in the morning; Kacker was in Strike No. 3; and Guha was part of Strike No. 6, which was later in the afternoon. Eventually, the PAF officially corrected their records and accepted that Devayya was actually shot down by Flight Lieutenant Amjad Hussain, and Guha was shot down by Flight Lieutenant A. H. Malik.

On 16 September, accompanied by his wingman Flying Officer Mohammad Shaukat-ul Islam, (Note: According to John Fricker, author of Battle For Pakistan: The Air War Of 1965, Flying Officer M. I. Shaukat was a young and inexperienced pilot, with a total of nearly 300 flying hours including 70-80 hours on the F-86 Sabre.) Squadron Leader MM Alam flew their F-86 Sabres into Indian airspace near Halwara. In response, IAF Flying Officers Prakash Sadhashivrao Pingale and Farokh Dara Bunsha immediately scrambled. Upon sighting the Sabres, the IAF pilots split their targets: Pingale pursued and shot down Shaukat, while Bunsha pursued Alam. He was able to manoeuver and out-turn Bunsha in a dogfight and shot down his Hunter aircraft. Flying Officer Bunsha was killed in action.

==== Disputed record ====
Assessing the widely publicised claims of MM Alam in shooting down five Hawker Hunters in under 30 seconds on 7 September, his former colleague retired Air Commodore Sajad Haider called the claims into question. In his 2009 memoir, Haider wrote that it was "tactically and mathematically very difficult to resurrect the incident in which all 5 Hunters in a hard turn were claimed to have been shot down in a 270 degree turn in 23 seconds". He highlighted that both, "The Story of the Pakistan Air Force" (1988) and historian John Fricker, admit the difficulty of verifying the event, especially since only two wrecked aircraft were found near Sangla Hill. The aircraft belonged to Squadron Leader Sureshchandra Bhaksar Bhagwat and Flying Officer Jagdev Singh Brar, who were burnt beyond recognition. Indian aviation historian Pushpindar Singh Chopra and F-86 Sabre enthusiast Duncan Curtis agree with this account and credit Alam with these kills. Haider also referred to Alam as the "undisputed ace of PAF".

Referring to the other three claimed aircraft, Haider argued that if, in fact, five jets had been downed within 23 seconds during a tight manoeuver, they should have crashed in close proximity of each other. The suggestion that some might have flown for several more minutes before crashing is, in his view, "superfluous and unworthy of the official PAF history." Despite this, he highlighted that "MM Alam really did an excellent job of shooting down 2 Hunters," and noted that, despite having a "somewhat ineffective wing man," he managed to engage ten Hunters within just a few minutes of combat—an extraordinary feat in itself. Haider went on to credit Alam with a third air kill, that of Squadron Leader Rawlley, who crashed on 6 September shortly after engaging in air combat with Alam. The IAF also credits Alam with this kill.

The fact that no verifiable gun camera footage of the five Hunter kills on 6 September was ever made public by the Pakistani authorities further casts doubt on Alam's claims.

=== Post-war ===
After the war, Alam was awarded the Sitara-i-Jurat by the Government of Pakistan. According to Azim Daudpota, at the award ceremony when President Ayub Khan was introduced to Alam, Khan had tears in his eyes. In recognition of his achievements, the Dhaka City Corporation gifted him a residence which he did not accept.

On 8 March 1968, Wing Commander Alam led the ferry flight that brought the first six Dassault Mirage III aircraft from France into Pakistani airspace. The other aircraft were piloted by Squadron Leaders Hakimullah Khan Durrani, Farooq Feroze Khan, and Farooq Umar, along with Flight Lieutenants Arif Manzoor and Akhtar Rao.

==== Deputation to Syria ====
In the early 1970s, he was deputed to Syria at the request of the Syrian government, to train their pilots. After the 1971 War broke out back home, resulting in the secession of East Pakistan and the creation of Bangladesh, Alam became depressed and did not report for duty for those months according to Azim Daudpota. He refused to accept his salary, as he believed he hadn't earned it. Additionally, when some PAF officers had submitted excessive personal claims from the Syrian government, Alam had them court-martialed. Daudpota states that this was from his strict sense of ethics.

He was promoted to the rank of temporary Group Captain by the Government of Pakistan on 10 February 1977.

=== Return to Pakistan ===
In July 1978, Air Commodore MM Alam was appointed as Assistant Chief of Air Staff (Flight Safety) and was awarded the Sitara-i-Imtiaz for his contributions. In 1980, he attended the Royal College of Defence Studies in the United Kingdom, where officials issued a report comparing him to Field Marshal William Slim, 1st Viscount Slim. When he returned to Pakistan, he had hoped he would be given command of an operational air base but was not.

In March 1981, he was designated as the Assistant Chief of the Air Staff (Plans). In May of that year, he played a key role in the "Zarb-e-Kaleem" exercise of the Pakistan Army, as commander of Blue Land Forces. He was also responsible for overseeing the planning of the PAF's U.S. aircraft and weapons procurement program and was appointed deputy leader of the PAF delegation to the United States to negotiate a military assistance agreement.

Air Commodore Alam was pivotal in determining Pakistan's future air warfare capability. At a briefing with President Zia-ul-Haq and Air Chief Marshal Anwar Shamim to discuss aircraft options now that relations with the USA had resumed, Alam (by his account) stood at the end of the meeting to challenge Shamim. "Sir, we should go for nothing less than F-16s which would serve our needs for the next 20-30 years" His overt challenge incited an irate response from Zia. Before leaving the briefing, Zia threw his folder on the table and said, "Gentlemen, I don't think you have done your homework properly". The Pakistan Air Force eventually bought the F-16s.

=== Confronting corruption and subsequent retirement ===
By mid-1981, rumors of corruption were circulating within the Air Force, including allegations against Air Chief Marshal Anwar Shamim, the Chief of Air Staff (CAS). Reportedly, he had purchased a ranch in the United States for $500,000 and "nobody had the courage to inform or question the CAS about this". According to several sources, motivated by loyalty and a strong commitment to integrity, Air Commodore Alam confronted Shamim directly and recommended that an investigation be conducted. Rather, Shamim authored a negative Annual Confidential Report (ACR) on Alam at the end of the year, questioning his character and combat record.

Alam brought the corruption allegations against Shamim to the attention of President General Zia-ul-Haq, who, after listening to him, responded "I am the Chief Martial Law Administrator, Chief of Army Staff, Chairman Joint Chief of Staff Committee, President and Chief Executive of the country, you think I do not know what you are telling me." Alam replied "Under these circumstances, I am very concerned for Pakistan and I refuse to serve any longer." To hush up the matter, he was prematurely retired and honourably discharged from service. Air Marshal Ayaz Ahmed Khan, who was then Vice Chief of Air Staff (VCAS), later lamented Alam's forced retirement while remarking that the Air Force had lost a "competent officer of unblemished integrity".

Alam felt hurt with the way he was treated and refused to accept his pension even though he had no other source of income. Retd Commander Abdul Qayum Khan of the Pakistan Navy, criticised Air Marshal (r) Ayaz, stating that as the VCAS—second only to the Air Chief in seniority—he couldn't have been so helpless and could have done much more to support Alam. He added that even a few voluntary retirement requests in protest by colleagues might have been a powerful response to the mistreatment Alam faced.

In an attempt to appease him, General Zia-ul-Haq offered him the role of Pakistan Ambassador to Australia and the chairmanship of the Institute of Strategic Studies Islamabad, both of which he rejected. Alam had written a letter of appeal to General Zia to contest his retirement. When Zia did not respond, Alam later remarked, "I refused to accept the pension since he didn't accept my letter."

== Later life ==
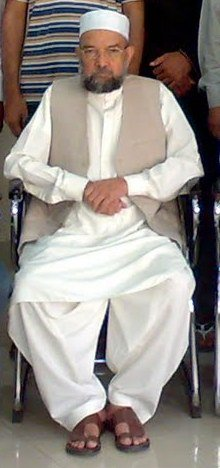
Alam in 2010

In 1983, Alam wrote several articles in the Pakistan Army Journal. Shortly afterwards, he disappeared and it was discovered that he had joined the Afghan Mujahideen to fight against the Soviet's during the Soviet-Afghan War. While there, a trip was arranged for him through Hizb-e Islami, so he could take part in a Mujahideen-led attack on the Soviet-controlled Bagram Air Base in 1985.

Professor Raja Ehsan Aziz traveled with Alam to the groups headquarters in Peshawar, where Hekmatyar gifted Alam a Russian pistol for self defence, hosted them at his guesthouse, and arranged winter clothing for the duo. Afterwards, Alam drove to Parachinar to join his group for a long journey across the mountains on foot and horseback. They crossed the Azro heights in the Logar Province through gunfire while evading landmines and needed to cross three other provinces to get to Bagram. Halfway down the heights, Alam slipped on icy rocks and fractured his left arm along with other injuries. After first aid was applied, he returned to Peshawar to receive proper treatment.

Towards the end of the Soviet occupation of Afghanistan, Alam later arrived in Panjshir Valley and stayed as a guest of guerilla commander Ahmad Shah Massoud, who regularly met him and addressed Alam as "General".

As months passed by, Air Marshal Ayaz Ahmed Khan had a late-night visitor who came looking gaunt and worn down. The visitor was Alam who had grown a beard, wore a Pakol cap, and told him that he had not eaten for two days. After eating, he slept for three days, left, and Ayaz never heard from him again.

By the year 2000, Alam developed serious medical problems as a result of heavy smoking. By one account, he smoked two packs a day, "the cigarette held between his index and middle finger, flipped from time to time to form a straight line with the swollen blue vein running like a groundswell in the middle of his pistachio-coloured hand, twitching to flick ash."

By 2002, Air Chief Mushaf Ali Mir had a two bedroom guesthouse built for him in the Air Transport Wing (ATW) Mess lawn in Chaklala and convinced him to finally accept his pension. He lived there until 2005-2006, when he was advised to temporarily move to PAF Base Faisal, though he intended to return, repeated delays kept him in Karachi, where he eventually settled in and rebuilt his personal library.

On 16 December 2012, Alam was admitted to the PNS Shifa Hospital. There was little to no media coverage of his illness or hospitalisation. He died in the morning of 18 March 2013.

== Commemorations ==
In December 1965, a cricket team named MM Alam's XI was formed in Pakistan in his honour. Among the players on the team was Hanif Mohammad.

Since as early as 1975, a road in Lahore has been named after him. Stretching from Main Market to Gulberg, MM Alam Road runs parallel to the Main Boulevard and serves as an alternative route. Over the years, it has evolved into a commercial hub, with numerous restaurants, fashion boutiques, shopping malls, beauty salons, and décor stores.

On his first death anniversary in 2014, PAF Base Mianwali was renamed PAF Base M.M. Alam. In addition, the Pakistan Post issued a commemorative stamp in his honour designed by Adil Salahuddin.

On 14 May 2023, the daughter of former Prime Minister Nawaz Sharif, Maryam Nawaz, falsely claimed that during the May 9 riots, protesters in Mianwali had burned down a fighter jet flown by MM Alam. However, Geo News fact-checked the claim, citing an anonymous official who clarified that the aircraft was a non-functional replica of an Shenyang F-6, not the F-86 Sabre piloted by Alam in the 1965 war. The official added that his Sabre is preserved at the PAF Museum, Karachi and that the F-6 replica only sustained minor damage to its ceramic coating, which had since been repainted and "is now as good as new."

== Awards and decorations ==
=== Sitara-e-Jurat ===
His Sitara-e-Jurat citation reads:

CITATION
SQUADRON LEADER MM Alam (PAK/1492)

"On 6 Sep 1965, during an aerial combat over enemy territory, Sqn Ldr MM Alam flying as pilot of an F-86 Sabre Jet shot down two enemies Hunter aircraft and damaged three others. For the exceptional flying skill and valour displayed by Sqn Ldr MM Alam in operations, he was awarded SJ. On 7 Sep 1965, in a number of interception missions flown by Sqn Ldr Muhammad Mahmood Alam against the enemy aircraft attacking Pakistan Air Force Station, Sargodha. Sqn Ldr Alam destroyed five more enemy's Hunter aircraft in less than a minute; this remains a record till today. Overall, he had nine kills and two damages to his credit. For the exceptional flying skill and valour shown by him in pressing home his attacks in aerial combats with the enemy, Sqn Ldr Muhammad Mahmood Alam is awarded a Bar to his SJ."

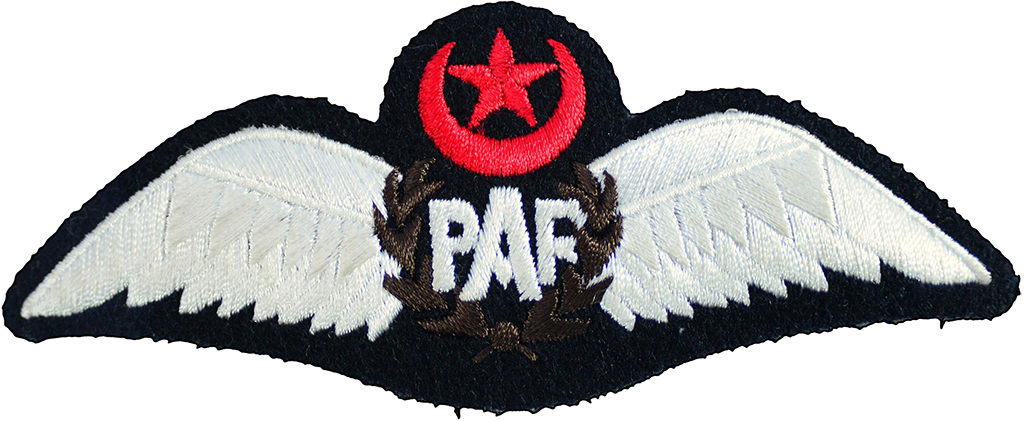

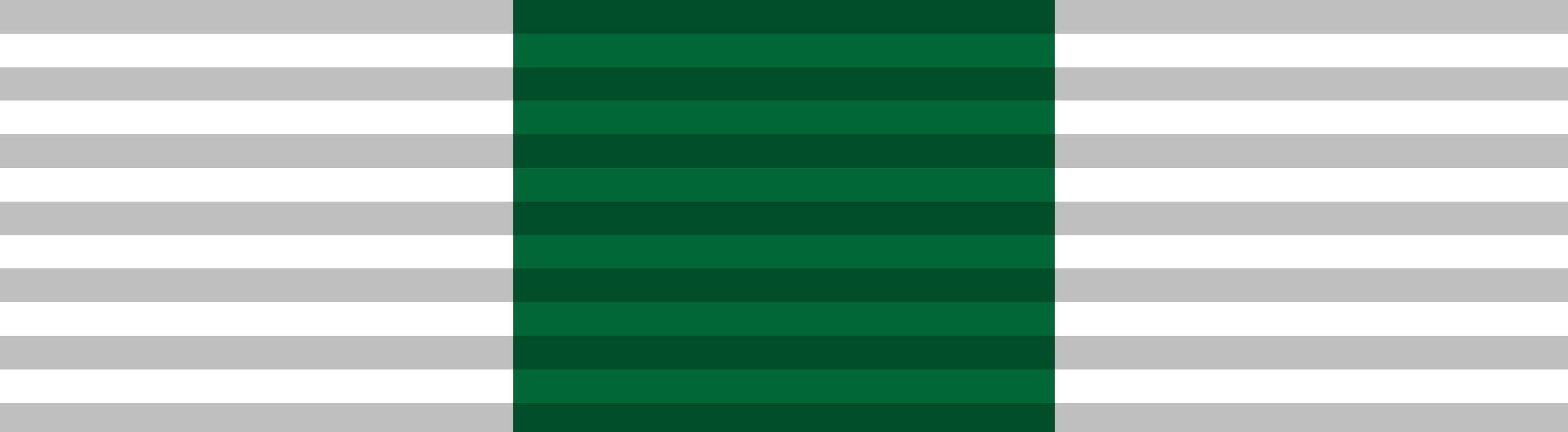

PAF GD(P) Badge RED (More than 3000 Flying Hours)
Sitara-e-Jurat & Bar (Star of Courage) 1965 War		Sitara-i-Imtiaz (Military) (Star of Excellence)	
Tamgha-e-Diffa (Defence Medal): 1. 1965 War Clasp; 2. 1971 War Clasp	Sitara-e-Harb 1965 War (War Star 1965)	Sitara-e-Harb 1971 War (War Star 1971)	Tamgha-e-Jang 1965 War (War Medal 1965)
Tamgha-e-Jang 1971 War (War Medal 1971)	Tamgha-e-Sad Saala Jashan-e-Wiladat-e-Quaid-e-Azam (100th Birth Anniversary of Muhammad Ali Jinnah) 1976	Tamgha-e-Qayam-e-Jamhuria (Republic Commemoration Medal) 1956	Hijri Tamgha (Hijri Medal) 1979

== See also ==
- Aviators who became ace in a day
- 8-Pass Charlie
- Saiful Azam
- Manuel J. Fernandez
