= Halwara Airport =

Airport serving Ludhiana, Punjab, India

- IATA: HWR; ICAO: VIHX

Summary
- Airport type: Public
- Owner: Ministry of Defence
- Operator: Airports Authority of India
- Serves: Ludhiana
- Location: Halwara, Ludhiana, Punjab
- Coordinates: 30°44′52″N 75°37′51″E

Map
- Location within Punjab Location within India

Runways
Direction	Length		Surface
Direction	m	ft	Surface
13/31	3,050	10,007	Concrete/Asphalt

Halwara Airport (IATA: HWR, ICAO: VIHX) also known as Ludhiana International Airport is an airport located in Halwara, Ludhiana, Punjab. It was developed as a civil enclave at the existing Halwara Air Force Station. It was inaugurated on 1 February 2026.

== Planning and development ==
Halwara Airport was developed as a civil enclave at the existing Halwara Air Force Station. It is the third operational airport in Punjab after Amritsar and Chandigarh. In 2021, the Greater Ludhiana Area Development Authority acquired 161.27 acres (65.26 ha) of land for the construction of the passenger terminal. The airport was inaugurated by Prime Minister Narendra Modi on 1 February 2026. Air India became the first airline to commence commercial operations from the airport, launching twice-daily domestic flights between Delhi and Halwara on 15 May 2026. The inaugural flight from Delhi received a ceremonial water cannon salute upon arrival at the airport.

== Airlines and destinations ==
Airlines	Destinations
Air India	Delhi

== See also ==
- List of airports in Punjab
- Ludhiana Airport
