= No. 45 Squadron IAF =

No. 45 Squadron Flying Daggers
- Insignia of The No. 45 Squadron IAF "Flying Daggers"
- Active: 20 November 1959 – December 2002; 1 July 2016 – present
- Country: Republic of India
- Allegiance: Indian Armed Forces
- Branch: Indian Air Force
- Role: Air superiority Precision Strike; Combat air patrol
- Garrison/HQ: Sulur AFS, Tamil Nadu
- Nickname: Flying Daggers
- Mottos: Ajithakshay; Invincible in the sky
- Engagements: Indo-Pakistani War of 1965; 1999 Pakistani Breguet 1150 Atlantic shootdown
- Decorations: President's Standard and Colour; VM P. K. Bundela (2000); VM V. S. Sharma (2000)

Commanders
- Current commander: Group Captain Samyantak Roy

Aircraft flown
- Attack: HAL Tejas

No. 45 Squadron Indian Air Force nicknamed as Flying Daggers is a Fighter Squadron internally based at the Sulur AFS. The squadron operates the indigenous HAL Tejas fighter from 1 July 2016. The squadron was initially based at Bengaluru and later shifted to its main base in Sulur AFS from 1 June 2018.

== History ==
The squadron was raised on 15 February 1957, with de Havilland Vampires, as a Ground-Attack and Close Air Support unit. Later The Vampires were replaced by MiG-21Bison. The MiGs which were operated from Naliya were withdrawn from squadron service in 2002. It is the first operational squadron of the indigenous fighter jet HAL Tejas. The squadron operated from HAL Airport, Bangalore for nearly two years before it moved to its designated locations at Sulur near Coimbatore. It is also the first fighter squadron to be part of the Southern Air Command of IAF headquarters at Thiruvananthapuram. Group Captain Madhav Rangachari is the first commanding officer.

=== Indo-Pakistan War of 1965 ===
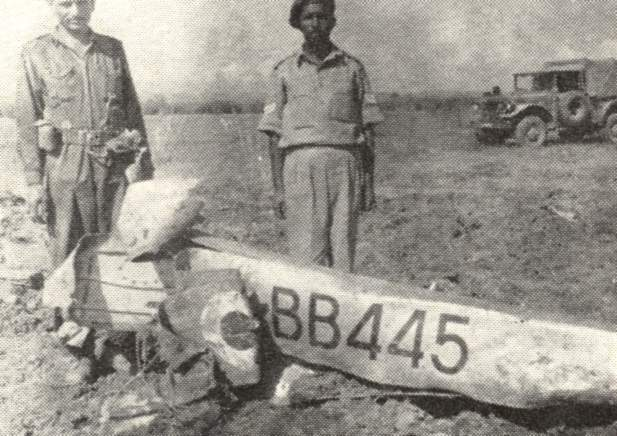
Wreckage of one of the No. 45 Squadron Vampires which were shot down by PAF F-86 Sabres.

On 1 September 1965, during the Indo-Pakistani War, No. 45 Squadron IAF responded to a request for strikes against a counter-attack by the Pakistan Army (Operation Grand Slam), and twelve Vampire Mk 52 fighter-bombers were successful in slowing the Pakistani advance. However, the Vampires encountered two PAF F-86 Sabres, in the ensuing dogfight, the outdated Vampires were outclassed. One was shot down by ground fire and another three were shot down by Sabres. The Vampires were withdrawn from front line service after these losses.

=== Atlantique incident ===
Indian Air Force No.45 Squadron was involved in the Atlantique incident on 10 August 1999. Two MiG-21 Bison from No.45 Squadron IAF equipped with R-60 missiles intercepted and following warnings issued and hostile action shot down a Pakistan Navy reconnaissance plane.

== Aircraft ==
Aircraft types operated by the squadron

Aircraft type	From	To	Air base
de Havilland Vampire	20 November 1959	February 1965	AFS Palam
Mig-21 FL	February 1966	July 1973	AFS Chandigarh
Mig-21 FL	July 1973	May 1978	AFS Bareilly
Mig-21 FL	May 1978	April 1982	AFS Hasimara
Mig-21 bis	April 1982	December 2002	AFS Naliya
HAL Tejas Mk1	1 July 2016	30 June 2018	Bengaluru
HAL Tejas Mk1	1 July 2018	Present	AFS Sulur

== Gallery ==
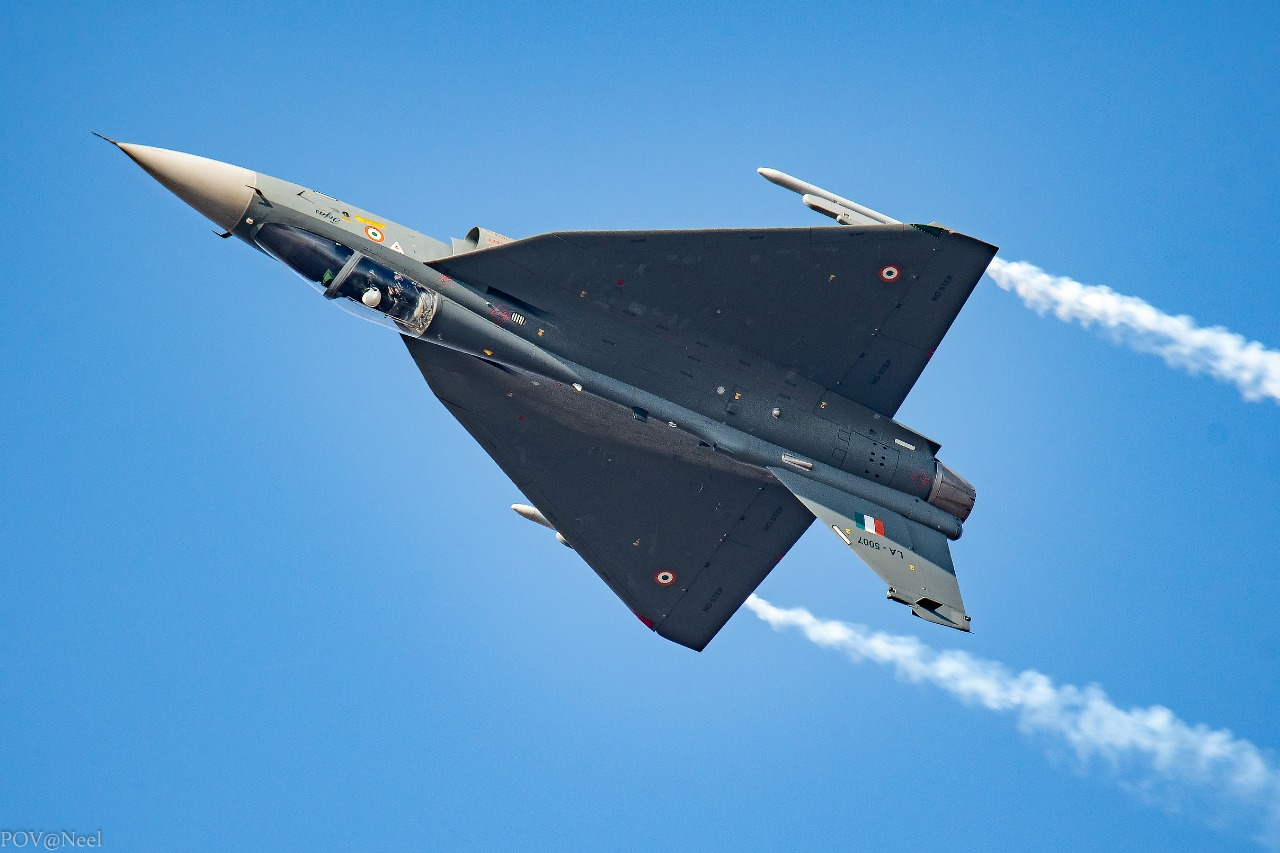
Tejas (SP-07) of No. 45 Squadron IAF Flying Daggers in inverted flight

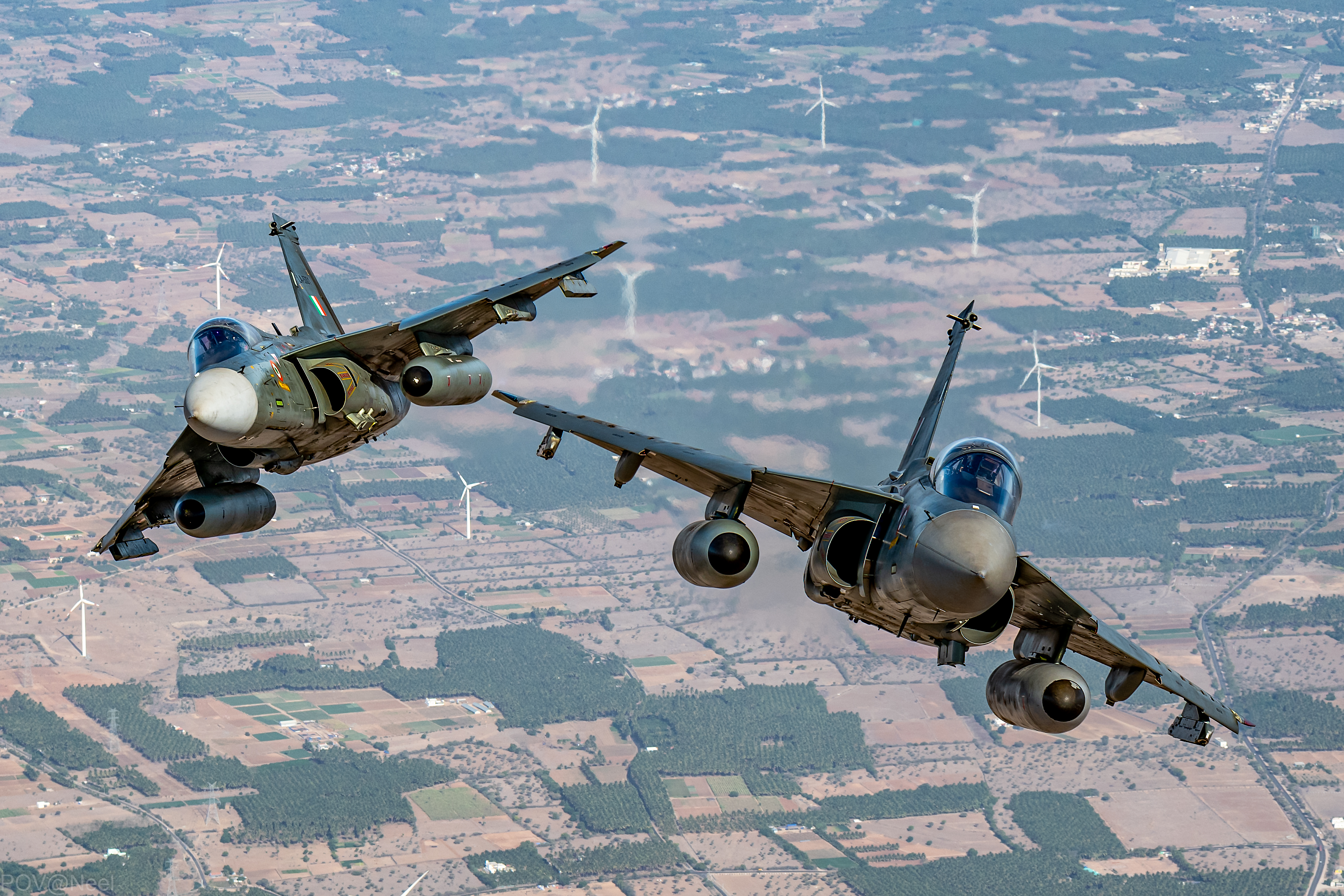
HAL Tejas IOC variants of Squadron 45 Flying Daggers doing air manoeuvre
