= 1999 Pakistani Breguet 1150 Atlantic shootdown =

Shoot down of Pakistani Naval Air Arm airplane by Indian Air Force

Pakistan Navy Atlantique shootdown
- Part of Indo-Pakistani wars and conflicts
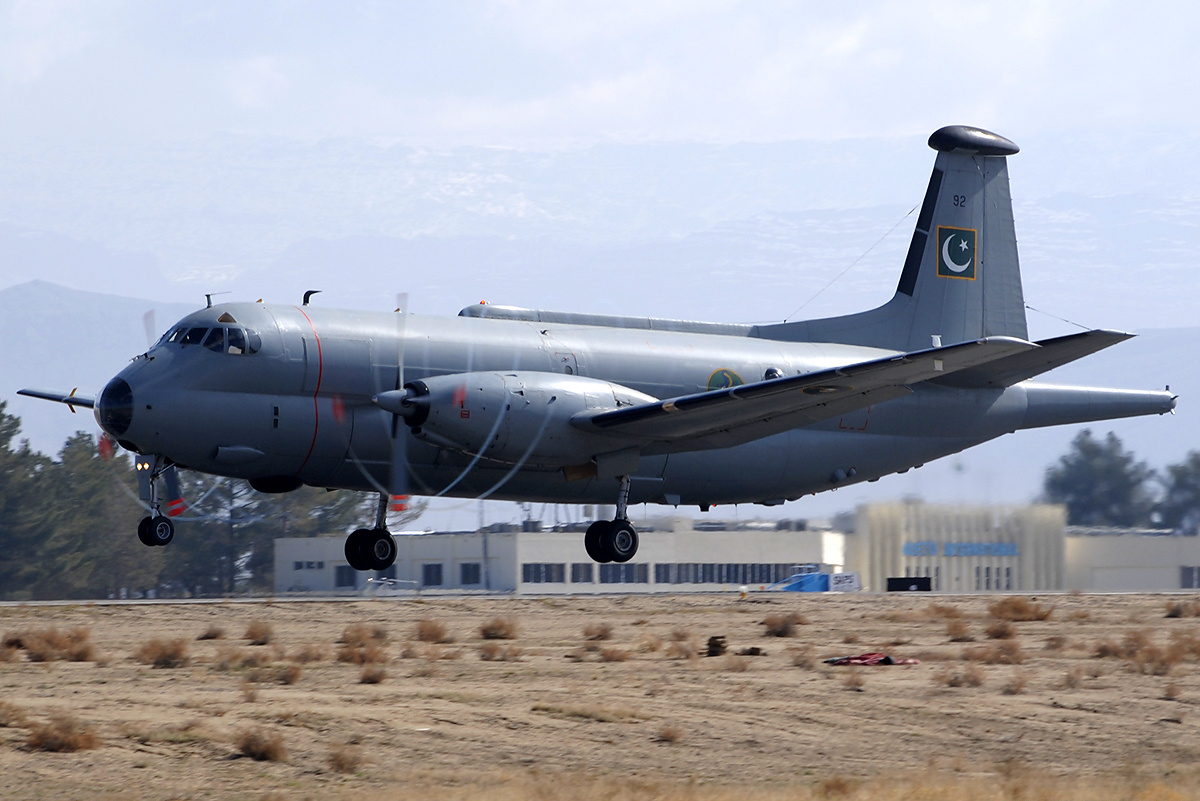
- A Pakistan Navy Breguet 1150 Atlantic
Date	10 August 1999
Location	Rann of Kutch
Result	IAF intercepted and shot down Pakistani naval reconnaissance plane; Deterioration of Indo-Pakistani relations

Belligerents
India	Pakistan

Commanders and leaders
Atal Bihari Vajpayee (Prime Minister of India); ACM Anil Tipnis (Chief of Air Staff)	Nawaz Sharif (Prime Minister of Pakistan); Adm. Fasih Bokhari (Chief of Naval Staff)

Units involved
Indian Air Force: No. 45 Squadron	Pakistan Navy: No. 29 Squadron

Strength
2 MiG-21 Bis	1 Atlantic-91N

Casualties and losses
None	5 naval officers killed 11 sailors killed

The Atlantique incident occurred on 10 August 1999, when a Breguet Atlantic maritime patrol aircraft of the Pakistan Naval Air Arm was shot down by a MiG-21 fighter of the Indian Air Force over the Rann of Kutch, on the border between India and Pakistan. Sixteen Pakistani personnel including the pilots were killed as a result. The event took place just a month after the Kargil War ended, further escalating the already strained relations between the two countries.

Foreign diplomats based in Pakistan who were escorted to the site by the Pakistan Army noted that the plane may have crossed the border. They also believed that India's reaction was unjustified. Pakistan later lodged a compensation claim at the International Court of Justice, blaming India for the incident, but the court dismissed the case, ruling that it had no jurisdiction in the matter.

== Confrontation ==
The French-built Breguet Br.1150 Atlantic, c/n 33, flight Atlantic-91, of 29 Squadron, was one of the Pakistan Navy's frontline aircraft, used primarily for patrol and reconnaissance. Atlantic-91 left Mehran Naval Base in Pakistan at 9:15 am PKT (9:45 IST). Indian Air Force ground radar picked up the plane as it approached the India-Pakistan border. Two IAF MiG-21 interceptor aircraft of No. 45 Squadron, from the Indian airbase at Naliya in the Kutch region, were scrambled. After a series of manoeuvres—with conflicting versions of events from both sides—the two fighter jets were given clearance to shoot down the Pakistani plane. At 11:17 am IST (10:47 am PKT), nearly two hours after takeoff from Pakistan, the Atlantic was intercepted and an infrared homing R-60 air-to-air missile was fired at it by Squadron Leader P.K. Bundela, hitting the engine on the port side of the plane.

== Claims and counterclaims ==
The region in Kutch, (marked in red) where the incident took place

The event immediately sparked claims and counter-claims by both nations. Pakistan claimed that the plane was unarmed and the debris was found on Pakistan's side of the border, and there was no violation of Indian airspace. According to the official Pakistan version of events, the plane was on a routine training mission inside Pakistan air space. The Pakistani Prime Minister stated during the funeral service of the airmen that the shooting was a barbaric act.

Enlarged map of the region showing Kori Creek and Sir Creek area, where the plane was shot down and wreckage was found respectively.

The Indian Air force claimed that the aeroplane did not respond to international protocol and that it acted in a "hostile" manner, adding that the debris of a downed aircraft could fall over a wide radius. Indian sources also stated that Pakistan's Information Minister, Mushahid Hussein, was initially quoted as saying that the aircraft was on a surveillance mission. India also alleged that the plane violated a bilateral agreement, signed by India and Pakistan in 1991, under which no military aircraft were to come within 10 kilometres (6.2 mi; 5.4 nmi) of the border (although Pakistan claimed the Atlantic was not a combat aircraft). Indian experts also questioned why a training mission was being carried out so close to the border, when all air forces conduct training flights in clearly demarcated training areas located well away from international boundaries. According to them, the Pakistani claim was untenable since the primary role of the Atlantic is for operations over the sea and that to carry out a training flight over land deep inside foreign territory was an indication of its use in a surveillance role. India displayed part of the wreckage of the Pakistani naval aircraft at New Delhi airport the next day. Pakistan stated that the wreckage was removed from its side of the border by Indian helicopters.

While Pakistan said that the plane was unarmed and the debris was within Pakistani territory, India maintained that warnings had been given to the Atlantic and that its flight trajectory meant it could have fallen on either side of the border. According to the Indian version of events, the MiGs tried to escort it to a nearby Indian base, when the Pakistani aircraft turned abruptly and tried to make a dash for the border; it was only then that it was fired upon. India claimed that the debris was found in a radius of two kilometres (1.2 mi; 1.1 nmi) on either side of the border and that the intrusion took place 10 kilometres (6.2 mi; 5.4 nmi) inside the Kori Creek, which is Indian territory. Pakistan requested that the matter be taken up in the UN. Indian officials claimed that there had been previous violations in the area and pointed out that in the previous year a Pakistani unmanned surveillance aircraft had intruded 150 kilometres (93 mi; 81 nmi) inside the Indian border, coming close to the Bhuj air base before the IAF spotted it and brought it down with several missiles.

Indian analysts state "flare-ups" in the Rann of Kutch region were routine, and despite bilateral agreements, both India and Pakistan had conducted air intrusions in the past. Thus, the fact that the Atlantic was shot down, despite coming close to the Indian border, came as a surprise. Indian officials add that Pakistan military aircraft had violated Indian airspace at least 50 times since January 1999, showing videotapes of Pakistani Atlantics "buzzing", or flying provocatively near the Indian Navy's warships in the Indian Ocean. Some Indian analysts stated that the Atlantic was nearly destroyed in 1983 on a similar encounter and noted other close encounters and violations from Pakistani naval planes.

Some experts stated that the Atlantic was probably conducting a "probe" on India's air defence system, mainly the radar equipment in the border area; they advised that it was not part of any planned aggressive military action by Pakistan. Foreign diplomats who visited the crash site noted that the plane "may have strayed into restricted space", and that Islamabad was unable to explain why it was flying so close to the border; they added that India's reaction to the incident was not justified. Many countries, the G8, the permanent members of the UN Security Council, as well as the western media questioned the wisdom behind Pakistan's decision to fly military aircraft so close to the Indian border.

== Rise in tensions ==
On the day following the attack, an IAF helicopter carrying journalists to the site of the attack was attacked by the Pakistan Marines with a surface-to-air missile. Pakistani officials asserted that two Indian jets had intruded into Pakistani airspace near the Atlantic wreckage site, along the border between the Indian state of Gujarat and Pakistan's Sindh Province, and were then fired upon by Pakistan marines. No damage was recorded as the missiles missed the target. The IAF thus aborted their mission and could safely return. The helicopter carrying the journalists also returned without any damage.

Following this, and the rising tensions in the area coupled by the fact that the Sir Creek was a disputed territory, both the countries' militaries near the Rann of Kutch and nearby were put on high alert. Pakistan sent a company of marines, equipped with both laser guided and infrared homing shoulder-fired surface-to-air missiles, to the site near the border. Coming barely weeks after the Kargil Conflict where both nuclear armed countries fought high altitude warfare, this incident was seen with growing concern around the world. The US State Department termed the subcontinent as being in a state of "continued high-stakes tension."

== Lawsuit ==
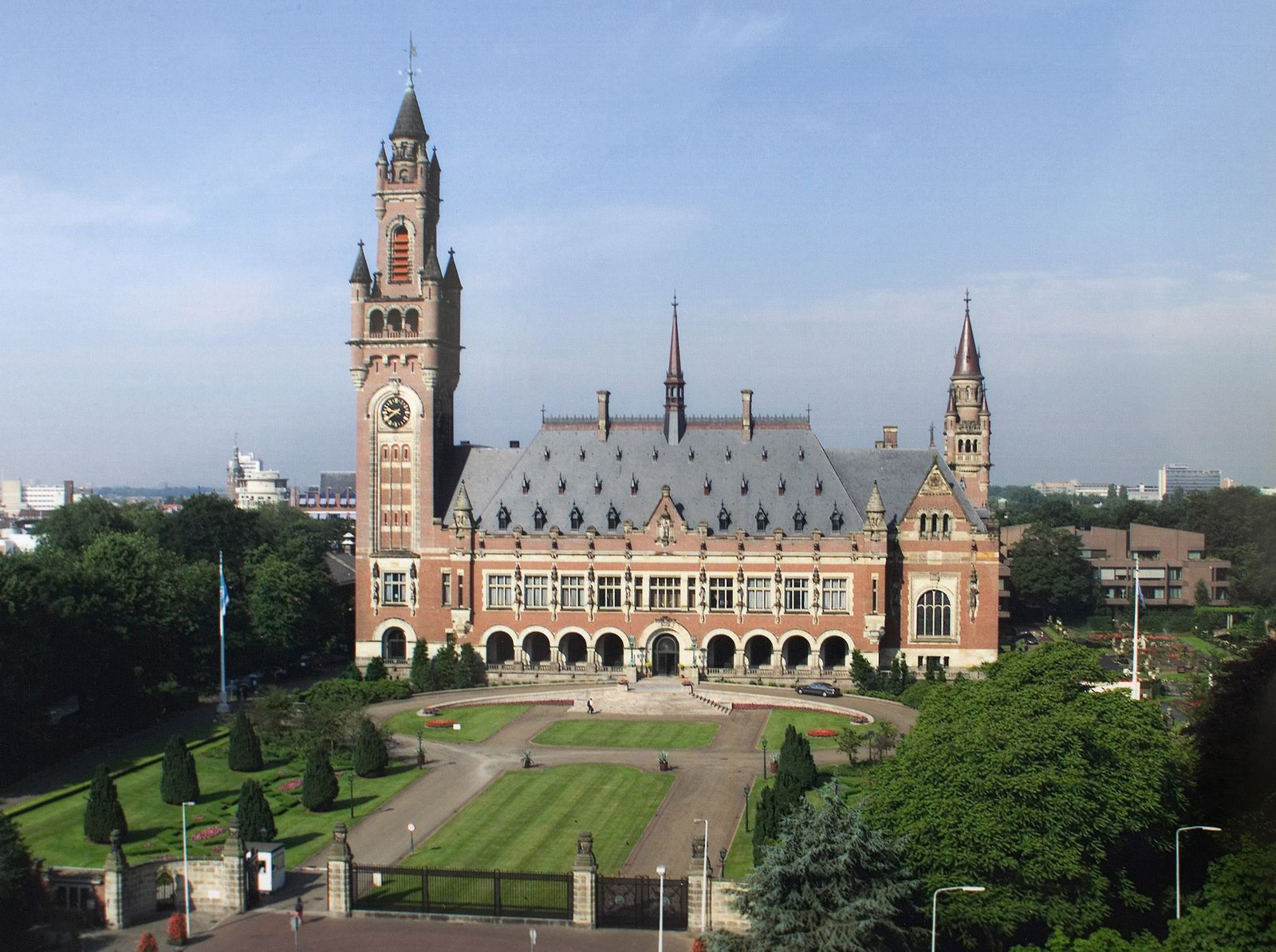
The International Court of Justice dismissed Pakistan's case on the grounds that the court did not have jurisdiction.

On 21 September 1999, Pakistan lodged a compensation claim at the International Court of Justice (ICJ) in The Hague, accusing India of shooting down a military aircraft. Pakistan sought about US$60 million in reparations from India and compensation for the victims' families. India's attorney general, Soli Sorabjee, argued that the court did not have jurisdiction, citing an exemption it filed in 1974 to exclude disputes between India and other Commonwealth States, and disputes covered by multi-lateral treaties. In the buildup to the case, India also contended that Pakistan had violated the 1991 bilateral agreement between Pakistan and India on air violations, which states: "Combat aircraft (including, bombers, reconnaissance aircraft, jet military trainer and armed helicopter) will not fly within 10 km of each other's airspace including air defence identification zone."

On 21 June 2000, the 16-judge Bench headed by Gilbert Guillaume of France ruled, with a 14–2 verdict, upholding India's submission that the court had no jurisdiction in this matter. Pakistan's claims were dropped, without recourse to appeal, and the outcome was seen as a decision highly favourable to India. The Pakistan government had spent close to 25 million Pakistani rupees (approx. $400,000) on the case.

== Aftermath ==
In India, the incident made the two pilots of the MiG-21s into instant heroes. On 8 October 2000, the prestigious Vayu Sena Medal was awarded to Squadron Leader P. K. Bundela. The medal was also awarded to Wing Commander V. S. Sharma (the fighter controller who tracked the Atlantic, guided the pilot and ordered him to attack the plane) and Squadron Leader Pankaj Vishnoi, the helicopter pilot who recovered a part of the Atlantic's debris from the marshy border regions of the Rann.
