= Vinod Neb =

Indian Air Force fighter pilot (1942–2024)

Wing Commander Vinod Kumar Neb VrC, and Bar
- Born: 25 December 1942
- Died: 30 January 2024 (aged 81); Delhi, India
- Military career
- Allegiance: India
- Branch: Indian Air Force
- Service years: 1963-1992
- Rank: Wing Commander
- Service number: 8189 F(P)
- Conflicts: Indo-Pakistani War of 1965; Indo-Pakistani War of 1971
- Awards: Vir Chakra; Vir Chakra

Wing Commander Vinod Kumar Neb VrC and Bar was a retired Officer and fighter pilot of the Indian Air Force and a hero of the Indo-Pakistani War of 1965 and Indo- Pakistan War of 1971. He was awarded with medals for bravery twice during his service. He was awarded the Vir Chakra twice ( hence the Bar) for shooting down a Pakistan Air Force Sabres in each war in 1965 and 1971.

He died on 30 January 2024, aged 81.

== War time history ==
Flying Officer V.K. Neb, a young and inexperienced Hawker Hunter pilot of No. 27 Squadron, scored his first aerial kill in the Indo-Pakistani War of 1965 on 6 September 1965, while on a dusk patrol with Flt Lt D.N. Rathore, Neb was called back to Halwara Airfield, which was under attack. As they engaged retreating PAF Sabres, Neb shot down aircraft Flt Lt Yunus Hussain, KIA with a 1.5-second cannon burst.

Six years later, during Indo-Pakistani War of 1971 on 4 December 1971, now flying a Hawker Hunter with No. 17 Squadron in the Eastern Sector, Neb claimed another Sabre kill during an attack on Dacca. While Hunter pilots reported downing four Sabres that day, PAF confirmed losing only three, leaving Neb’s second kill unverified from Pakistani sources. Independent sources have identified the downed pilot as Flt Lt Saeed Afzal Khan, KIA.

== Awards ==
In 1965 Neb was awarded the Vir Chakra. The citation reads as follows:

"On the 6th September, 1965, Flying Officer Vinod Kumar Neb was detailed as number two in a section of two aircraft to carry out a standing patrol over Halwara airfield. Two of our aircraft were on the circuit. Suddenly four Pakistani Sabre Jets sneaked in low and started to attack the airfield and also our aircraft on the circuit. Flying Officer Neb, though still under training and short of experience, attacked the enemy formation with supreme confidence and shot down one of the enemy Sabres. During this encounter, Flying Officer Vinod Kumar Neb displayed commendable courage and devotion to duty of a high order."

In 1971 Neb was awarded the Bar to Vir Chakra (i.e. He was awarded a second Vir Chakra) The citation reads as follows:

"On the 4th December, 1971, Flight Lieutenant Vinod Kumar Neb was No. 3 of a formation of four aircraft, on a mission to strike the airfield of Kurmitola in the Dacca complex. While the formation was near the target, it was intercepted by three Sabres. Flight Lieutenant Vinod Kumar Neb engaged an enemy aircraft and shot it down. Thereafter he saw another Sabre and although he was low on fuel, he started maneuvering his aircraft for a vantage position to engage the enemy aircraft. In the meantime, the fire warning light on the aircraft came on and his leader also ordered him to disengage in view of the limited fuel. He brought the aircraft safely to base in spite of engine trouble. Subsequently, he operated from the Detachment of the Squadron away from the base and flew a number of ground strike missions in the Comilla Sector. Along with his leader, he was responsible for destroying the enemy bunkers and gun positions on the hillocks overlooking our troops in Barkar which enabled its capture by our troops. Throughout the operations, Flight Lieutenant Vinod Kumar Neb displayed gallantry and professional skill of a high order".
