= List of airports in Punjab, India =

Punjab, a state of India, has airports which have access to international flights, domestic and some disused airstrips for emergency purposes. The airports are operated and owned by either the Airports Authority of India and Government of Punjab or private companies.

There are three international airports, nine domestic airports, four private airports and one military base in Punjab.There are three disused airports, one of them serving as a flying school. Gujarat State Aviation Infrastructure Company Limited (GUJSAIL) has been established by the Government of Gujarat to foster the development of aviation infrastructure in Punjab.

== List of Airports ==
- Sri Guru Ram Dass Jee International Airport(ATQ)
- Adampur Airport (AIP)
- Ludhiana Airport (LUH)
- Pathankot Airport (IXP)
- Patiala Airport
- Chandigarh Airport (IXC)
- Bathinda Airport (BUP)
- Ludhiana Halwara International Airport (HWR)
