= Mohammad Shahid Alam =

Pakistani economist, academic, and social scientist

M. Shahid Alam
- Born: 1950 (age 75–76); Dacca, East Pakistan
- Citizenship: Pakistan
- Education: University of Karachi; University of Dhaka; University of Western Ontario
- Scientific career
- Fields: Economics
- Institutions: University of Karachi; Northeastern University

Mohammad Shahid Alam is a Pakistani economist, academic, and social scientist. He is a professor of economics at Northeastern University. He is a member of the advisory board of the Institute for Policy Research & Development, London.

== Background ==
Alam was born to a Muhajir Family in 1950 in Dhaka, East Pakistan, moving to West Pakistan in 1971 following the creation of Bangladesh from East Pakistan. He holds a BA from the University of Dhaka, an MA from the University of Karachi, and a Ph.D. from the University of Western Ontario. (1979) His brothers are, the Pakistan Air Force flying ace, Air Commodore Muhammad Mahmood Alam and particle physicist M. Sajjad Alam.

== Career ==
Alam's academic writings focus, among other things, on the economic effects of Western foreign and economic policies on formerly colonized states. He writes critically about the present-day global wealth disparities produced by Western policies. He draws attention to the pro-capitalist ideological intent and Eurocentric biases of mainstream economics. He is an outspoken opponent of U.S. policies in the Middle East and the Global South.

His publications include:

1. Poverty from the Wealth of Nations (Macmillan, 2000), # Governments and Markets in Economic Development Strategies (Praeger: 1989),
2. Is There An Islamic Problem (Kuala Lumpur: The Other Press, 2004, republished in 2007 as Challenging the New Orientalism, IPI: 2007),
3. Israeli Exceptionalism: The Destabilizing Logic of Zionism (Palgrave Macmillan: 2009).
4. Intimations of Ghalib, (Orison Books, 2018).
5. Yardstick of Life, (Kindle Direct Publishing, 2024).

He is also a regular contributor to CounterPunch.

Alam is a critic of Zionism and Israel, which he does not believe has a right to exist. He is a supporter of the boycott of Israel movement, and wrote in a column for CounterPunch in 2002, "The Academic Boycott of Israel," that "Of necessity, dispossession is implemented by force-unless this project is aided by pathogens; and, it follows, that resistance to the colonizer must be violent."

In 2004 a column of Alam's, "America and Islam, Seeking Parallels" made an analogy between the September 11 attacks, which he called an Islamic insurgency, and the American Revolution, attracting controversy and criticism from right-wing critics such as David Horowitz and Daniel Pipes, who appeared on The O'Reilly Factor to attack Alam, and Alam received death threats.

== Books ==
- Israeli Exceptionalism: The Destabilizing Logic of Zionism (Palgrave Macmillan, 2009).
- Challenging the New Orientalism: Dissenting Essays on the "War Against Islam" (IPI, 2007).
- Is there an Islamic problem? : essays on Islamicate societies, the US, and Israel (The Other Press, 2004).
- Poverty From the Wealth of Nations: Integration and Polarization in the Global Economy since 1760 (Macmillan, 2000).
- Governments and Markets in Economic Development Strategies: Lessons From Korea, Taiwan, and Japan. (Praeger, 1989).
- Intimations of Ghalib, (Orison Books, 2018).
- Yardstick of Life, (Kindle Direct Publishing, 2024).
