= Mohammad Sajjad Alam =

Indian-born American physicist (1947–2022)

Mohammad Sajjad Alam মহম্মদ সাজ্জাদ আলম محمد سجاد عالم
- Born: 5 January 1947; Dacca, Bengal Presidency, British Raj
- Died: 4 May 2022 (aged 75); New York City, New York, U.S.
- Education: Dhaka University; Indiana University
- Scientific career
- Fields: Particle physics
- Workplaces: King Fahd University of Petroleum & Minerals; University at Albany, SUNY

Mohammad Sajjad "Saj" Alam (Bengali: মহম্মদ সাজ্জাদ আলম, Urdu: محمد سجاد عالم; 5 January 1947 – 4 May 2022) was a Pakistani and a naturalized American particle physicist. His work focused on particle physics and computational physics. He played a significant role in several major particle physics experiments (the Mark II, CLEO, GEM, BaBar, ATLAS collaborations) that led to new discoveries in the area of high-energy particle physics.

== Early life and family ==
Alam was born to a muhajir family in Dacca, then part of the Bengal Presidency of British India (now Bangladesh), to a family hailing from Calcutta. His family moved to West Pakistan around 1971, after the secession of East Pakistan. Alam was one of eleven siblings: his eldest brother, Muhammad Mahmood Alam (1935 – 2013), was a Pakistani fighter pilot and war hero who rose to the rank of one-star general in the Pakistan Air Force; another brother of his, M. Shahid Alam, is an economist and a professor at Northeastern University,

Alam decided to become a physicist when his eighth grade science teacher at Saint Gregory High School in Dacca introduced him to atomic and nuclear physics: "I was hooked; I came home and told my father I know that I would become a physicist," he wrote.

He was the first member of his family to come to the United States, and was one of the first Pakistanis to get a PhD in experimental particle physics. He ultimately became a naturalized American citizen, and lived the rest of his life in the U.S. He was a married man and the father of two children.

== Academic history and positions ==
Alam began his academic career at Dacca University (in what is now Bangladesh), where he earned a BSc in physics and an MSc in theoretical nuclear physics. He then went on to earn a PhD in experimental particle physics from Indiana University in 1975. Alam afterwards spent a year at Vanderbilt University as a research associate before securing a position at the Stanford Linear Accelerator Center. In 1979, after spending four years at the SLAC, he accepted a faculty position at Vanderbilt.

Alam remained with Vanderbilt until 1984, at which time he joined the faculty of the University at Albany, SUNY. At Albany, he served as chair of the physics department (2003–2006) and director of the Albany High-Energy Physics Lab. Alam was also the chair professor of physics at the King Fahd University of Petroleum & Minerals.

== Research ==
Alam's research focused on experimental particle physics and computational physics. He was the principal investigator on several major experiments, including the ATLAS experiment at CERN, the BaBar experiment at SLAC, and the CLEO experiment.

He was the author or co-author of over 1200 refereed papers, 43 of which were his direct publications.

The major experiments that Alam had directed or played a significant role in include:

- (1972–1974) SLAC E-82 Searches for Exotic Associated with Mesons Using a Fast Forward Neutron Trigger with the 15" Rapid Cycling Bubble Chamber
- (1974–75) SLAC E-103 Search for Exotic Mesons Using a Fast Forward Proton Trigger with the SLAC Streamer Chamber
- (1976–79) MARK II at SPEAR studying collisions. Focus on charm physics
- (1979–2000) CLEO collaboration (CLEO 1.5, CLEO II), studying collisions at the Cornell Electron Storage Ring (CESR). Focus on charm and beauty physics
- (1992–1993) Gas Electron Multiplier (GEM) detector proposal for the Superconducting Super Collider
- (1993–2000) CLEO II Upgrade. Particle Identification System
- (1995–present) Joined the ATLAS detector pixel group at the Large Hadron Collider, CERN
- (1998–2000) Nominal member of BTeV at FNAL
- (2000–present) Joined the BaBar Collaboration

Alam worked with the Beowulf cluster class of supercomputers.

He greatly enjoyed mentoring new physicists, supervising more than twenty PhD students. He was also keenly interested in the relationship between science and religion, and taught a course on the subject.

== Honours and awards ==
- Dacca University, East Pakistan Overseas Merit Scholarship (1970)
- Excellence in Research Award by the University at Albany, SUNY (1993)
- Abdus Salaam Award for Achievements in Science, Pakistan League of America (2000)
- Fellow, Islamic World Academy of Sciences (2002)
- Member, Pakistan Academy of Sciences (2003)
- ISI Highly Cited Researcher in Physics
- Islamic World Academy of Sciences (2006)
