= Bréguet 1150 Atlantic =

1961 maritime patrol aircraft family

Br.1150 Atlantic Atlantique 2
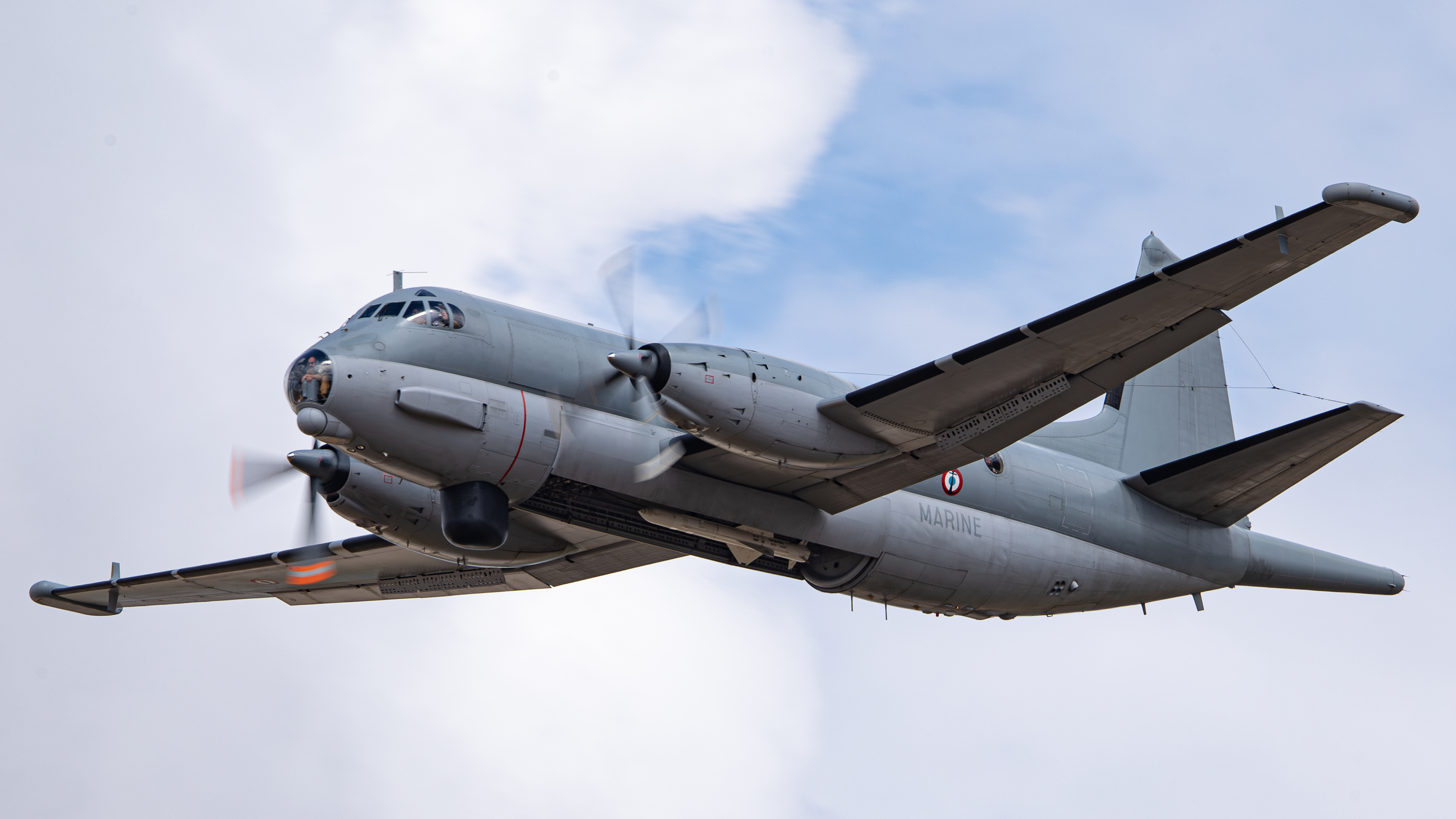
- Breguet Atlantic 2 of the French Navy

General information
- Type: Maritime patrol aircraft
- Manufacturer: Breguet Aviation
- Status: Active service
- Primary users: French Navy German Navy; Italian Air Force; Royal Netherlands Navy
- Number built: 87 Atlantique 1; 28 Atlantique 2

History
- Manufactured: 1961–1987
- Introduction date: 1965
- First flight: 21 October 1961

The Breguet Br.1150 Atlantic is a long-range maritime patrol aircraft designed and manufactured by French aircraft manufacturer Breguet Aviation.

Designed in response to a 1958 NATO specification as a replacement for the Lockheed P2V Neptune, Breguet's submission was declared the winner over several competing bids. To produce the Atlantic, a multinational consortium, Société d'Étude et de Construction de Breguet Atlantic (SECBAT), was established. During 1963, an initial order for 60 Atlantics – 40 for France and 20 for Germany – was received. Follow-on orders from export customers followed shortly thereafter. It was first introduced to operational service during 1965.

The Atlantic has been operated by a total of five countries, commonly performing maritime roles such as reconnaissance and anti-submarine warfare. The Atlantic is also capable of carrying air-to-ground munitions to perform ground-attack missions; a small number of aircraft were also equipped to perform ELINT operations. An updated version, the Atlantique 2 or ATL2, was produced by Dassault Aviation for the French Navy in the 1980s. A further improved model, the Atlantique 3, was proposed during the 1990s but ultimately unbuilt. Other operators of the Atlantic have included the German Navy, the Italian Air Force, the Pakistan Navy, and the Royal Netherlands Navy.

== Development ==
In 1958, NATO produced a specification for a long-range maritime patrol aircraft to replace the Lockheed P2V Neptune, with Breguet's design, the Br 1150, chosen as the winner of the competition at the end of the year. A multinational consortium, Société d'Étude et de Construction de Breguet Atlantic (SECBAT) was set up to develop and build the Atlantic. The first prototype made its maiden flight at Toulouse on 21 October 1961, with the second prototype flying on 25 February 1962, followed by two preproduction aircraft with a longer fuselage in February 1963 and September 1964.

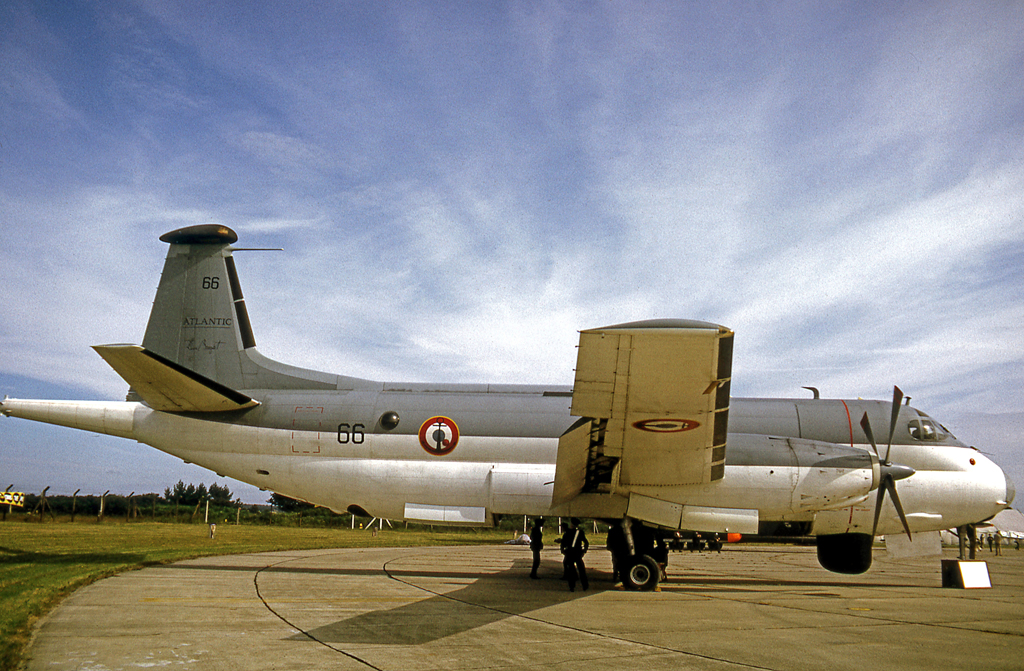
Atlantic of the French Navy in service with 24 Flotille in 1973

An initial order for 60 Atlantics – 40 for France and 20 for Germany – was placed in 1963, with deliveries starting in 1965 and continuing to 1968. The production line had shut down by the time the Netherlands placed an order for nine Atlantics and Italy ordered eighteen. Aircraft from this second production batch were delivered from 1972 to 1974.

In 1978, the French Government authorised development of a new, updated version of the Atlantic, the Atlantic Nouvelle Génération (later known as the Atlantique 2 when orders from other nations did not occur). While the airframe and engines of the new aircraft changed little, equipment and avionics were considerably revised; these included new radar, a new sonar processor, a replacement tactical computer, and a forward-looking infrared camera turret installed under the nose. The ability to carry Exocet missiles was also added. Two prototype Atlantique 2s were produced by converting existing Atlantics; the first of these made its maiden flight on 8 May 1981. Production of the Atlantique 2 was authorised on 24 May 1984. Deliveries started in 1989 with 28 eventually built, from an original requirement for 42.

By 2012, the Atlantique 2 had been rebranded as the ATL2, at which point France had a total of 22 in service. In 2012, 18 French Atlantiques were undergoing a series of upgrades to increase the type's effectiveness in two stages, Phase I addressing obsolescence issues and Phase II adding new capabilities. Also in 2012, a separate project was conducted to integrate the MU90 Impact torpedo. Aircraft that received these upgrades shall have an extended service life as well, enabling Atlantique operations to be extended to around 2032.

A further upgraded Atlantique 3 was proposed for the Royal Air Force's Replacement Maritime Patrol Aircraft (RMPA) competition, however it was withdrawn in 1996 following alleged hints from Ministry of Defence officials that the submission was unlikely to be successful; the competition later selected the BAE Systems Nimrod MRA4 instead. The Atlantique 3 would have featured various off-the-shelf avionics upgrades, including the adoption of a two-man glass cockpit. The use of uprated Allison AE2100H turboprop engines to drive new Dowty-built six-bladed composite propellers reportedly would have increased power by nearly 10% and reduced fuel consumption by 15%. In late 1996, Dassault (which had merged with Breguet in the 1970s, thus acquiring the Atlantic design) intended to offer the Atlantique 3 to Germany, Italy, and France. By 2005, Dassault had abandoned marketing efforts on the Atlantique 3, choosing to promote a variant of the Dassault Falcon 900 corporate jet as a maritime patrol aircraft instead.

== Design ==
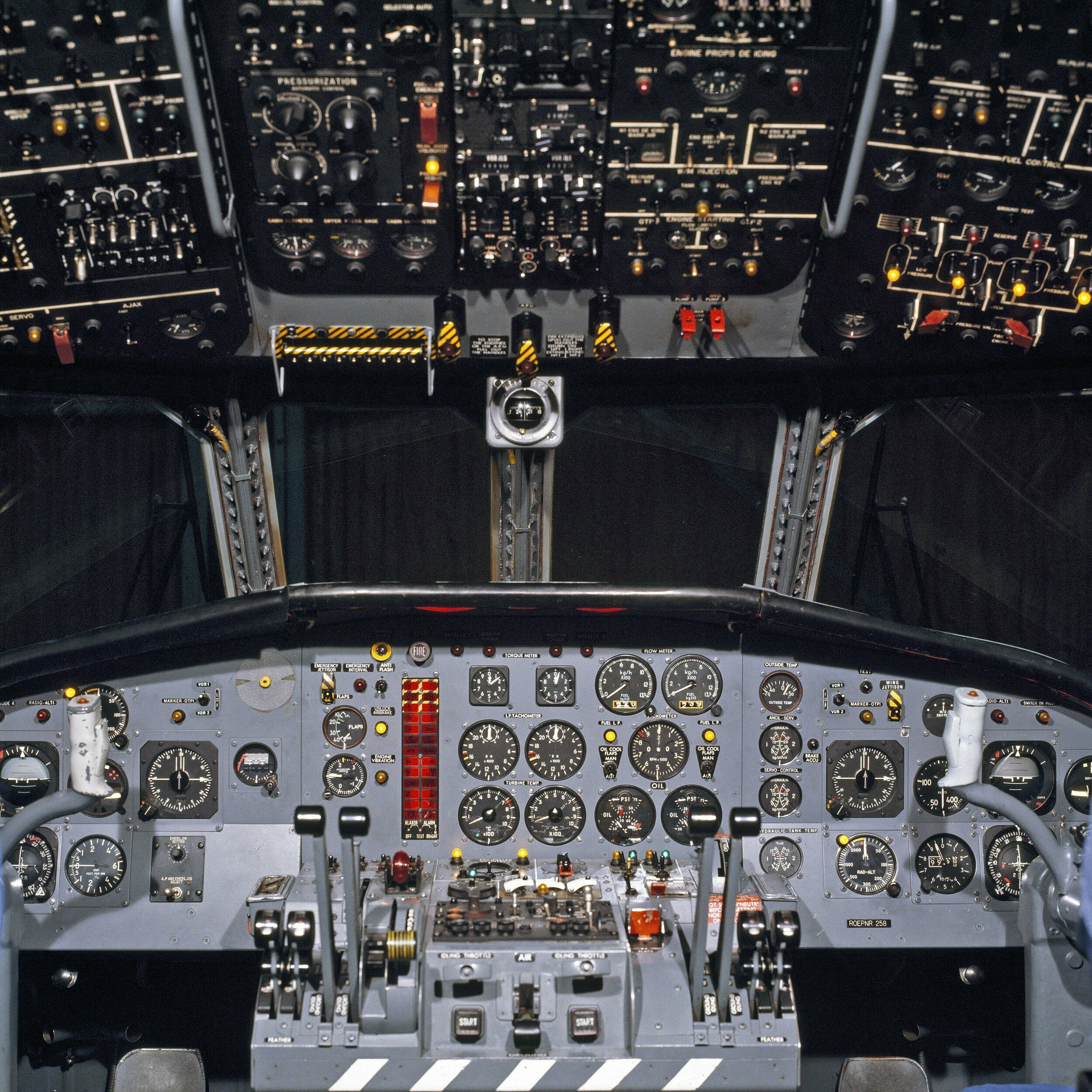
Cockpit of an Atlantic

The Breguet Br.1150 Atlantic is a twin-engined, mid-winged monoplane with a "double-bubble" fuselage; the upper lobe comprising a pressurised crew compartment, and the lower lobe housing a 9 m (27 ft 6 in) long weapons bay, with sonobuoy tubes aft of the weapons bay. A radar scanner is housed in a retractable underfuselage radome, while a magnetic anomaly detector is housed in a tail boom. It is powered by a pair of Rolls-Royce Tyne turboprop engines. An all-aluminium structure is used throughout the Atlantic's airframe; corrosion is alleged to be a considerable problem due to environmental factors imposed by the maritime environment.

The Atlantic was designed for its purpose, instead of refitting or modifying existing designs. Though the primary mission of the Atlantic is anti-submarine and anti-surface warfare, its secondary roles include search and rescue, mine laying and detection and long-range maritime surveillance. The Atlantic can carry either eight guided ASW torpedoes such as Mk 46 Torpedo, or 12 depth charges, or two AM.39 Exocet anti-ship missiles in its internal bomb bay. German Atlantics usually carried Mk 46s only and flew unarmed during the last years of their service. Italian Atlantics have been periodically armed with NATO-provided nuclear bombs.

In French service, 18 modernised Atlantique ATL2 are being equipped with various new avionics and onboard sensors. Such systems include the Searchmaster derived from RBE2-AA active electronically scanned array radar developed for Dassault Rafale, new digital acoustic processing systems, a Thales-manufactured identification friend or foe system, and DCNS-developed LOTI (Logiciel Opérationnel de Traitement de l'Information) combat mission software.

== Operational history ==
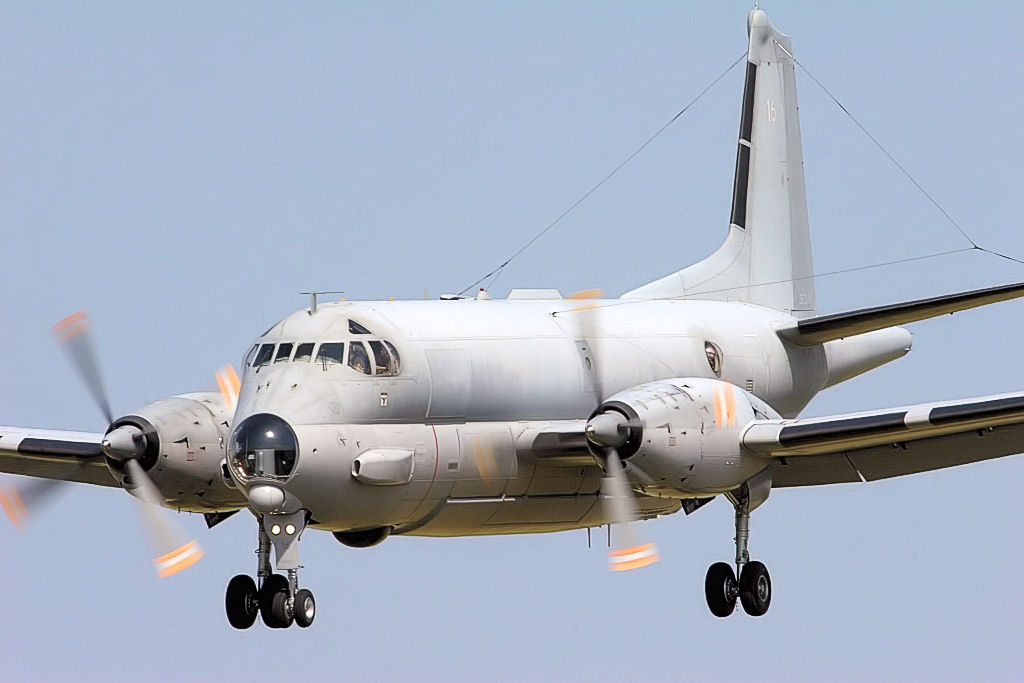
Atlantic in flight, 2006

External videos
- Breguet Atlantique Documentary
- German SIGINT Atlantic on take off

In 1987, a single Signals Intelligence (SIGINT) Atlanique was operated by France as an airborne headquarters during Opération Épervier, the French intervention against Libyan military units which had been deployed into neighbouring Chad. Communications intercepted by the Atlantique were immediately decoded and translated before being used to conduct strikes upon Libyan forces with greater accuracy.

The German Marineflieger operated a fleet of Atlantics between 1963 and 2005. A number of these aircraft were modified for SIGINT work and were based at Nordholz Naval Airbase. During the Cold War, they commonly flew across the Baltic Sea and along the border with East Germany; these flights often had American and British intelligence personnel on board in addition to their German crews. During the 1990s, Germany deployed SIGINT Atlantics to observe the United Nations embargo of Yugoslavia and for reconnaissance flights during the Kosovo War in 1999.

In 1992, Germany was considering replacing its Atlantics in the maritime patrol role, the modernised Atlantic-2 was considered to be a frontrunner to be the replacement. In 1996, the planned procurement of a replacement was delayed in favour of a life extension program to enable the Atlantic fleet to continue in service for a further decade. Germany ultimately elected to replace its Atlantics with a number of secondhand Lockheed P-3 Orions procured from the Netherlands. Several German Atlantics have been donated to museums, including the Militärhistorisches Museum Flugplatz Berlin-Gatow and the Dutch Air Force Museum, Soesterberg, Netherlands.

During the 1960s and 1970s, the Atlantic competed with the Lockheed P-3 Orion to be selected as the Royal Netherlands Navy's next anti-submarine aircraft. The selection process, during which Lockheed Corporation was alleged to have engaged in multiple incidents of bribery, ultimately chose the Atlantic. Fewer Atlantics were procured than originally planned however; and a total of three Atlantics out of the Netherlands' nine-strong fleet were lost through a series of failures during missions over the Atlantic Ocean. These losses resulted in the grounding of the type in 1981 and contributed to its eventual replacement by the P-3 Orion.

During NATO's intervention in the 1999 Kosovo War, French Atlantics performed overflying surveillance flights of the combat area; flights within Serbian airspace were conducted by unarmed aircraft.

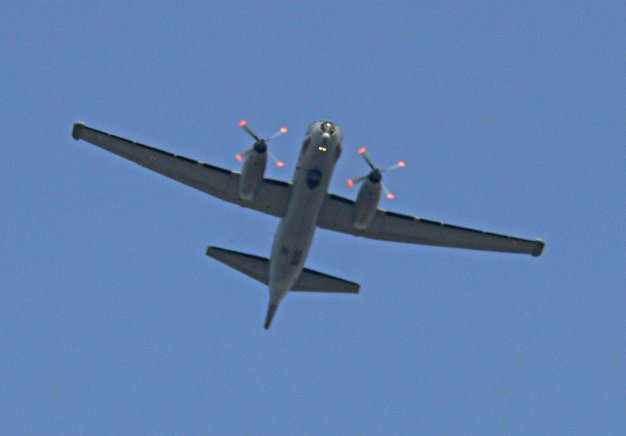
Atlantique flying overhead, 2006

In 1973, in the aftermath of the Indo-Pakistani War of 1971, the Pakistan Navy opted to procure three Atlantics from France. In 1999, a Pakistan Navy Atlantic inadvertently flew into Indian airspace while probing Indian air defenses and was intercepted and shot down by Indian Air Force MiG-21FL after the Atlantic ignored instructions and attempts to force it to land at an Indian base; the event become known as the Atlantique incident. After 36 years of service, Pakistan's remaining Atlantics were formally retired in September 2012, following the arrival of P-3 Orions to replace them.

In 2009, French Atlantics were dispatched to Dakar, Senegal, to participate in a multinational search effort to locate the crashed Air France Flight 447.

In January 2013, French Navy Atlantique-2s were deployed to act as ground-strike aircraft during Operation Serval over Northern Mali; a number of laser-guided GBU-12 bombs were dropped by the Atlantiques against Malian jihadist militants seeking to overthrow the Malian government. During the deployment, the Atlantiques also served as Intelligence, surveillance and reconnaissance (ISR) platforms, being able to provide a sustained presence unlike alternatives such as the EADS Harfang unmanned aerial vehicle (UAV).

In 2015, Atlantique-2s was deployed to Iraq at the beginning of Opération Chammal against Islamic State of Iraq and the Levant (ISIL) forces, initially performing ISTAR and forward air control missions. On 19 August 2015, an Atlantique-2 flew a mission with two Mirage 2000s and dropped a GBU-12 on a command and control building, its first strike mission of the operation. As French military operations expanded into Syria in September 2015, the long range of the Atlantiques from their base in the UAE was utilised when undertaking reconnaissance operations instead of shorter range aircraft such as the Dassault Rafale.

On 15 January 2025, two Atlantique 2 aircraft landed in Indonesia as part of mission Clemenceau 25 before exercise La Perouse 2025 after logistical stop overs in Greece, UAE and India (10 Jan). The aircraft traversed 7800 nautical miles and 30 flight hours to complement the Carrier Strike Group centered on Charles de Gaulle. A French Navy Atlantique participated at the International Fleet Review 2026 held at Visakapatanam in India.

== Variants ==
=== Br.1150 Atlantic ===
Long-range maritime reconnaissance aircraft.

The series' first operators became the French and German navies who contracted for 40 and 20 Atlantics respectively through an initial batch order from Breguet in 1963. These airframes were delivered to customers beginning in 1965 and ended in 1968. A follow-up order involved supply of the aircraft to the Netherlands and Italy shortly thereafter, these being delivered into 1974. Production was undertaken by a European consortium under the "Societe d'Etude et de Construction de Breguet Atlantic" (otherwise recognized as "SECBAT") name led by Breguet itself. Beyond these European powers, Pakistan received three ex-French Navy Atlantics in the 1970s. As an anti-ship, anti-submarine maritime warfare mount, the Atlantic series could be properly outfitted through torpedoes (up to 8 x Mk 46 / 7 x Murene series), depth charges, naval mines and conventional drop bombs as required - these held in the unpressurized internal bomb bay. Additionally the aircraft was cleared to drop specialized mission equipment for shipwreck.

=== Atlantique 2 ===
Updated variant, also known as the Atlantique Nouvelle Génération or ATL2.

It is the direct descendant of the Breguet Atlantic.

- Power for the Atlantique 2 was served through 2 x Rolls-Royce Tyne RTy.20 Mk 21 series turboprop engines (twin shaft) developing 6,100 horsepower each.
- maximum speed of 400 miles per hour,
- cruising speed of 200 miles per hour,
- ferry range of 5,635 miles
- mission endurance time of up to 18 hours
- operations at altitudes from 100 feet up to 30,000 feet through use of a pressurized cabin and flight deck.
- Rate-of-climb at 2,900 feet per minute.
- 2x Exocet AM-39 missile were added to armament.
- 6x MU90 Impact torpedo since July 2014.

The ATL2 has been in service for 20 or so years, and has undergone several retrofits. A renovation operation is in progress (2019–25); 18 out of the 22 ATL2 Standard 5 operated by the French Navy are upgraded to the new version called 'Standard 6'. The upgrade is comprehensive and should allow the aircraft to operate until 2035. It includes the development of a new combat system called 'Logiciel de traitement de l'information operationelle nouvelle génération' (LOTI-NG). The system is used to establish a tactical picture based on data gathered by the aircraft's various sensors. New digital operator stations have replaced the original analogue equipment. Another major improvement is the upgrade of the acoustic treatment subsystem called 'Sous-système de traitement acoustique numérique' (STAN). This system is able to operate more sonobuoys than its predecessor and scan a broader range of frequencies. The system can also operate the most recent US sonobuoys including in the multistatic mode. The Wescam MX-20 electro-optical (EO) turret has also been integrated (the same one used on board the Boeing P-8A Poseidon). This system had already been mounted on some ATL2s. The ATL2 is frequently used in Africa where it serves as backup to ground forces.

The last major element of the Standard 6 upgrade is:

- New radar Thales Searchmaster Active Electronically Scanned Array (AESA) radar. According to Thales, this multirole surveillance radar offers the highest level of operational performance to detect stationary and moving maritime targets, including in high sea states, at ranges up to 200 nautical miles (air-to-sea). The radar also has the capability to support ground surveillance operations. The French Navy will also receive a new mission preparation tool and simulator.
- New Thales acoustic subsystem to gather and process signals from the latest generation air-dropped sonobuoys for submarine detection.
- New navigation console designed by Dassault Aviation
- New consoles for the tactical display subsystem developed by the French army, "SIAé".
- The Wescam MX-20 electro-optical (EO) turret integrated into the combat system. With the Standard 6 upgrade, various operators are able to simultaneously access the images provided by the MX-20.

The French procurement agency Direction générale de l'armement (DGA) has authorised the transfer of the first two upgraded Dassault Atlantique 2 (ATL2) maritime patrol aircraft (MPA) to the French Navy, the French ministry for armed forces announced on 24 October. As of July 2022, half of the eighteen aircraft in the French Navy inventory had been upgraded to Standard 6. Upgrades of the remaining aircraft in the fleet are to continue until 2024. In November 2022, the upgraded aircraft was said to have reached the milestone of being able to perform the entire spectrum of missions assigned to it. The 10th upgraded aircraft was delivered in December 2022 and the 11th aircraft followed in April 2023. The final upgraded aircraft was delivered in February 2026.

Atlantique 3
Proposed modernised variant in the 1990s, unbuilt.

== Operators ==
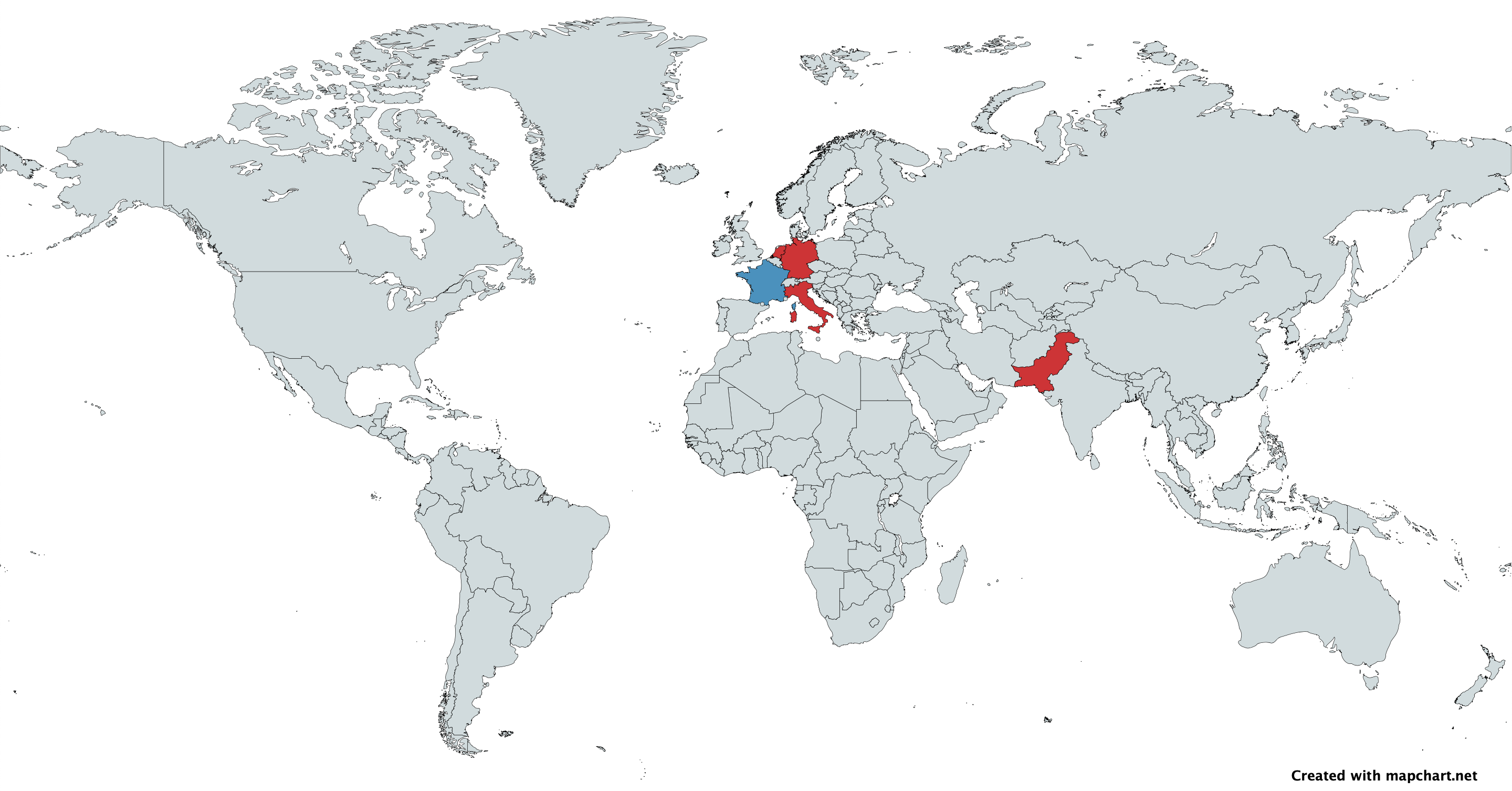
Map with operators of the Atlantic in blue and former operators in red

=== Current operators ===
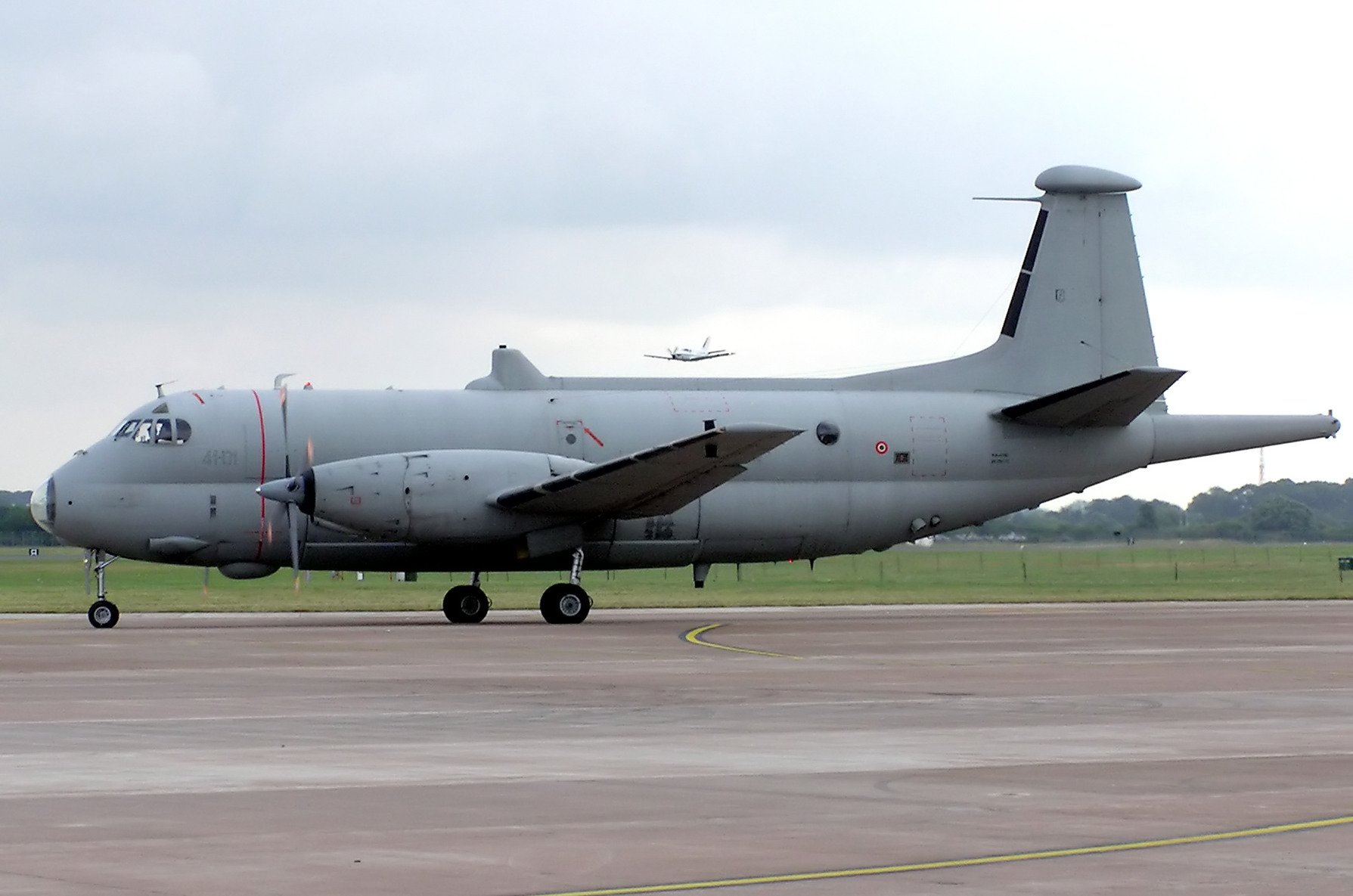
Italian Navy Atlantic Br.1150

France

- French Navy
  - French Naval Aviation – The original model was retired in 1996. Second generation Atlantique 2 in service. To be replaced by Airbus A321MPA.

=== Former operators ===
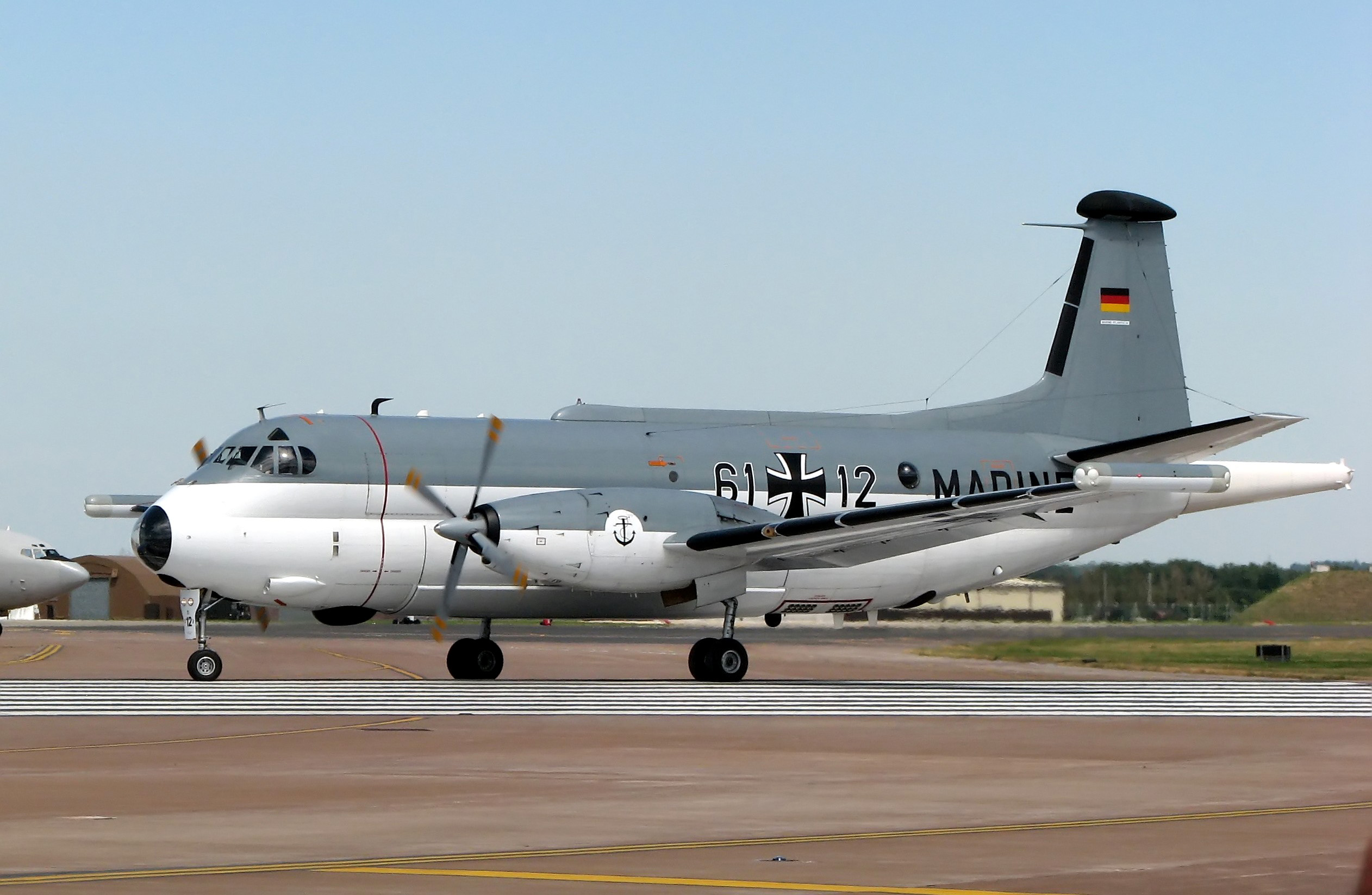
Atlantic from Marinefliegergeschwader 3 'Graf Zeppelin' about to depart RAF Fairford.

Germany

- German Navy – Received 20 Atlantics, with five converted to ELINT aircraft. Replaced all ASW aircraft by ex-Dutch P-3 Orion in 2005, the ELINT versions were planned to be replaced by the now cancelled EuroHawk UAVs.
- As Germany decided not to overhaul their P-3C, they will have to be retired by 2025. France proposed to lend four additional Atlantic 2 (Standard 6) as the Maritime Airborne Warfare System (MAWS) will not be operational before 2032. but Germany ordered five P-8A Poseidon in 2021

Italy

- Italian Air Force – 18 aircraft flown by pilots from the Italian Air Force and Italian Navy Aviation, but commanded by the Navy. – Replaced by the ATR 72MP.

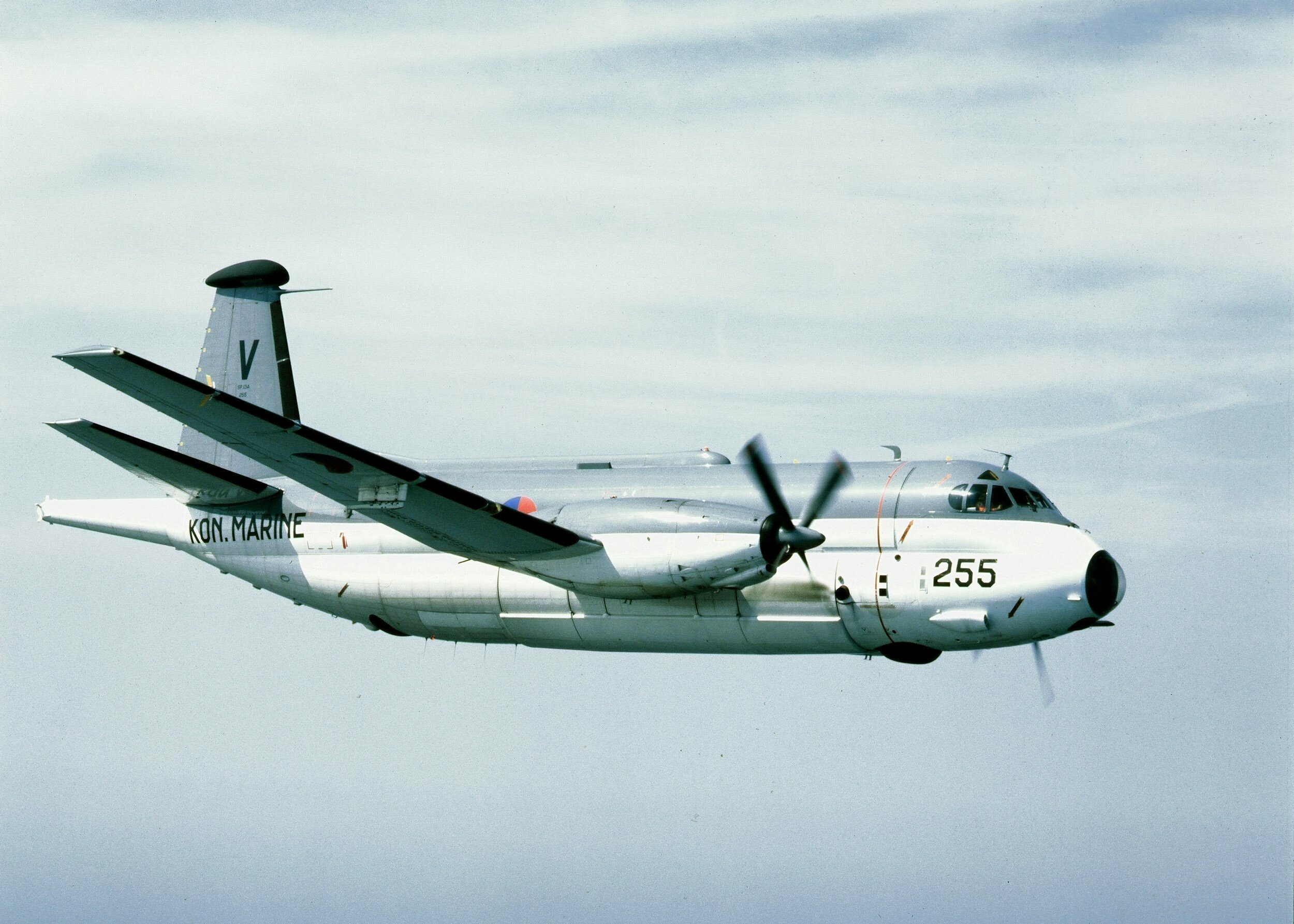
Royal Netherlands Navy Atlantic

Netherlands

- Royal Netherlands Navy
  - Dutch Naval Aviation Service – Replaced by the P-3 Orion.

Pakistan

- Pakistan Navy
  - Pakistan Naval Air Arm – Last aircraft retired in 2012 and replaced by ATR 72MP.

== Accidents and incidents ==
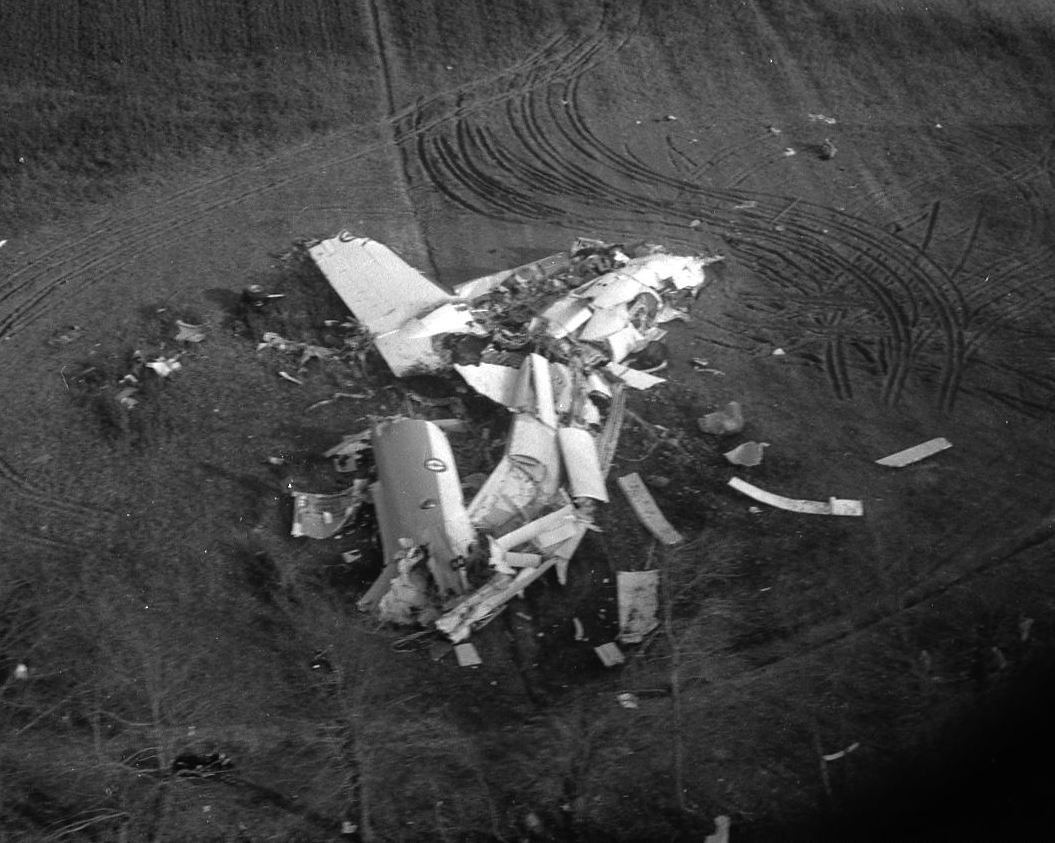
Second prototype crash of 19 April 1962, killing all three onboard

- 19 April 1962 – Second prototype aircraft crashed, killing all three onboard, during test flight after trying to divert due to an engine fire.
- 31 August 1967 – A French surveillance Breguet 1150 crashed on the Norwegian island of Prins Karls Forland, killing all 11 crew.
- 20 September 1968 – A French Air Force Atlantic crashed into the offices of the Royal Aircraft Establishment (RAE) while performing a display at the Farnborough Air Show, Hampshire, England. One of the RAE's civilian maintenance staff was killed, as were all five members of the crew.
- 15 August 1973 - A Dutch marine surveillance Breguet serial 257 suffered a problem with the elevator and ditched at 1500 hrs 1.5 km off the beach at Wassenaar, Netherlands. All 14 crew survived. The aircraft remained afloat and was salvaged, but later scrapped.
- 14 September 1978 - A Dutch surveillance Breguet ditched successfully in the Irish Sea west of Scotland after the explosion of the right Rolls-Royce engine. There were no fatalities among the crew.
- 15 January 1981 – A Dutch Marine Atlantic SP-13A was shadowing the Soviet Navy aircraft carrier Kiev in foul weather, with 30 ft waves and blizzard conditions. The Atlantic's crew transmitted a Mayday at 09:58 after suffering control problems due to a control rod failure in the horizontal stabilizer. It was not able to maintain height and was forced to ditch 113 miles west of the Inner Hebrides about half an hour later. Nine survivors were rescued by an RAF Sea King helicopter about two hours after the crash. Three crew members drowned.
- March 10 1981 – Shortly after taking off from Prince Said Ibrahim International Airport in Moroni, Comoros, on a maritime patrol mission over the Mozambique Channel, a French Navy Breguet 1150 Atlantic number 29 from Lann-Bihoué (France) flotilla 23F crashes into the mountain 15 kilometers (9.4 miles) from the airport, killing all 18 people on board. One engine caught fire shortly after take off.
- 18 May 1986 – While flying in cloud, a French Navy Atlantic crashed into a mountain in Djibouti, killing all 19 people on board.
- 10 August 1999 – At the Pakistani-Indian border, sixteen Pakistan Navy airmen were killed in what became known as the Atlantique incident; the Atlantic they were in was shot down by Indian air force Mikoyan-Gurevich MiG-21 by an R-60 missile after it allegedly intruded into Indian airspace, just a month after the Kargil War.

== Specifications (Atlantique 2) ==
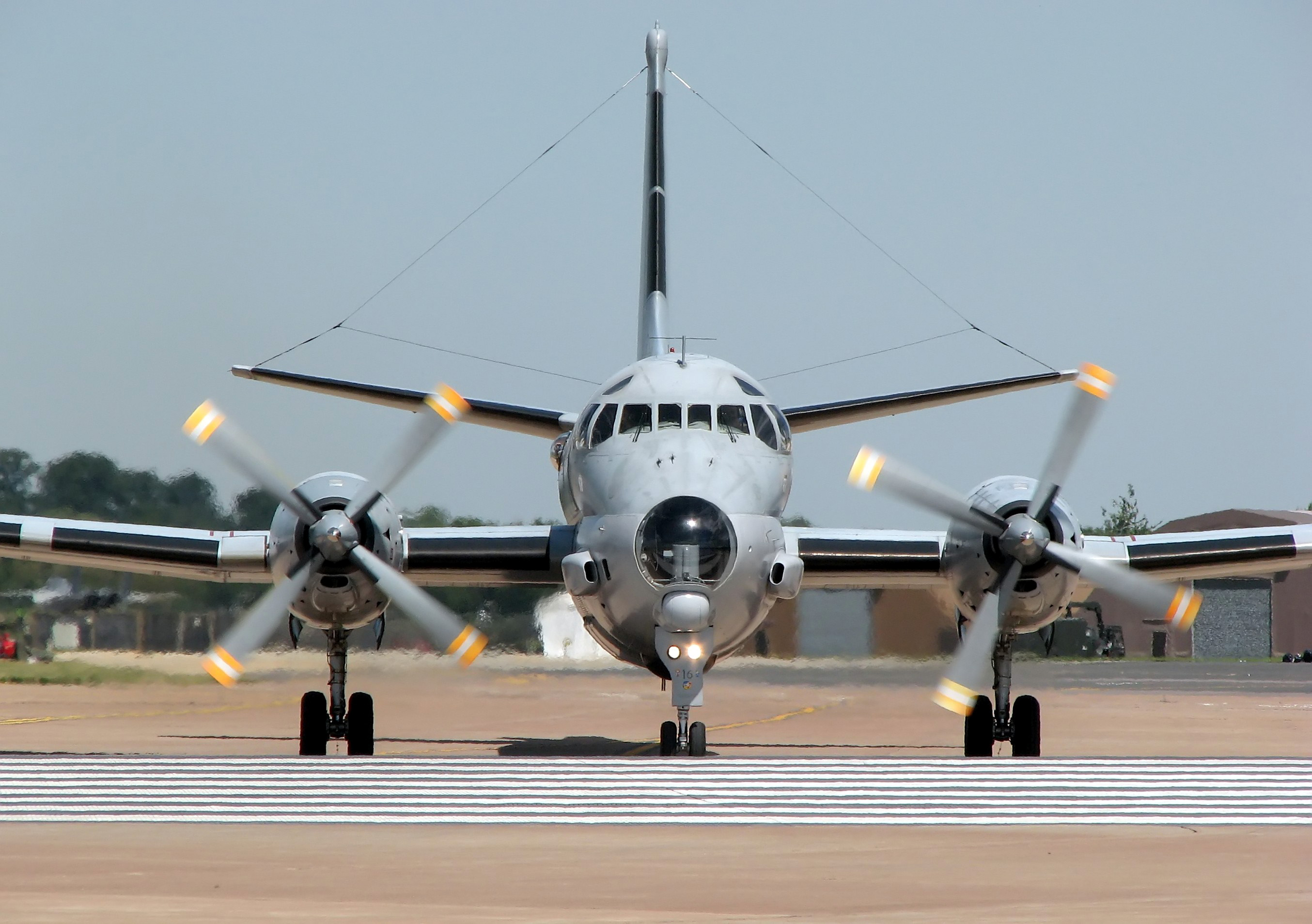
Head-on view of a French Navy Atlantic Br.1150 about to depart RAF Fairford

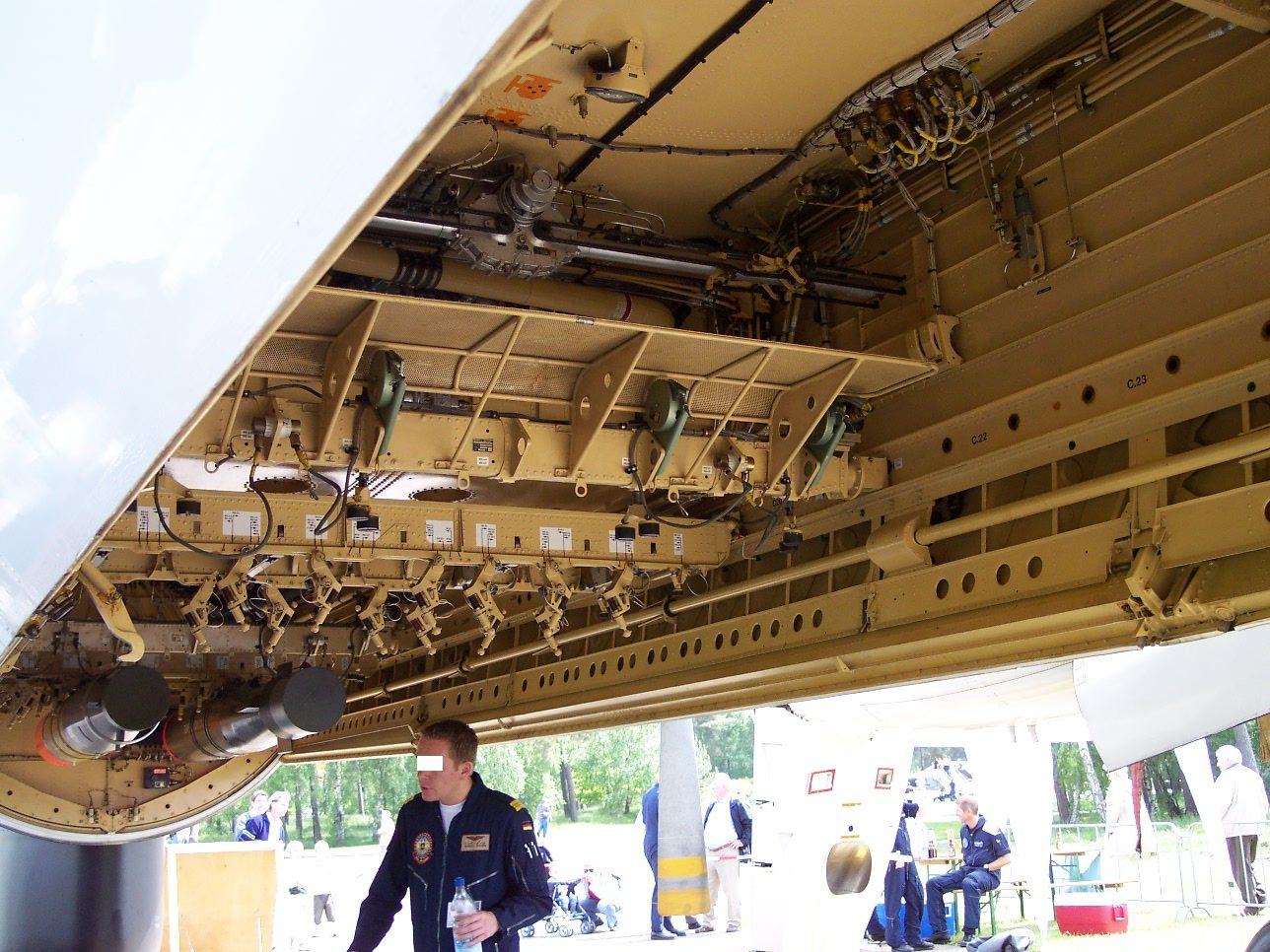
The internal weapons bay of an Atlantic; two torpedoes are present

Data from Jane's All The World's Aircraft 1988–89

General characteristics

- Crew: 12
- Capacity: 12 passengers or relief crew
- Length: 31.62 m (103 ft 9 in)
- Wingspan: 37.42 m (122 ft 9 in) including wingtip pods
- Height: 10.89 m (35 ft 9 in)
- Wing area: 120.34 m^{2} (1,295.3 sq ft)
- Empty weight: 25,700 kg (56,659 lb)
- Gross weight: 45,000 kg (99,208 lb)
- Max takeoff weight: 46,200 kg (101,854 lb)
- Powerplant: 2 × Rolls-Royce Tyne RTy.20 Mk 21 2-spool turboprop engines, 4,500 kW (6,100 shp) each (equivalent)

Performance

- Maximum speed: 648 km/h (403 mph, 350 kn)
- Cruise speed: 315 km/h (196 mph, 170 kn) patrol speed
- Stall speed: 167 km/h (104 mph, 90 kn) flaps down
- Endurance: 18 hours
- Service ceiling: 9,145 m (30,000 ft)
- Rate of climb: 14.7 m/s (2,900 ft/min)

Armament

- Up to 3,500 kg (7,700 lb), including torpedoes, depth charges, mines, anti-ship missiles, bombs and/or buoys

== See also ==
Aircraft of comparable role, configuration, and era

- Canadair CP-107 Argus
- Hawker Siddeley Nimrod
- Ilyushin Il-38
- Lockheed P-3 Orion

Related lists

- List of military aircraft of France
- List of military aircraft of Germany
