= Halwara =

Halwara Halawāṛā Halwada
- town
- Location in Punjab, India
- Coordinates: 30°43′N 75°39′E
- Country: India
- State: Punjab
- District: Ludhiana

Languages
  - Official: Punjabi
- Time zone: UTC+5:30 (IST)
- PIN: 141107
- Telephone code: 01624
- Vehicle registration: pb 56

Halwara (Punjabi: [hɐlɐʋaːɽaː]; ISO: Halawāṛā) is a township in Punjab state in India in the Ludhiana. It is the location of Halwara Air Force Base.
