= Indus Waters Treaty =

Water-distribution treaty between India and Pakistan

- Indus river and tributaries
- Type: Bilateral treaty
- Signed: 19 September 1960
- Location: Karachi, Pakistan
- Effective: 1 April 1960
- Condition: Ratification by both parties
- Signatories: Jawaharlal Nehru (Prime Minister of India); Mohammad Ayub Khan (President of Pakistan); W. A. B. Iliff (for IBRD)
- Parties: India; Pakistan
- Depositary: World Bank
- Language: English

The Indus Waters Treaty (IWT) is a water-distribution treaty between India and Pakistan to use the water available in the Indus River system in the territories of the two countries. The treaty was negotiated by India and Pakistan with the mediation of World Bank, and signed in Karachi on 19 September 1960 by Indian prime minister Jawaharlal Nehru and Pakistani president Ayub Khan. It classifies six major rivers of the Indus Basin into two categories, and gives India control over the waters of the three "Eastern Rivers"—the Beas, Ravi and Sutlej—which have a total mean annual flow of 33 million acre⋅ft (41 billion m^{3}), while control over the three "Western Rivers"—the Indus, Chenab and Jhelum—which have a total mean annual flow of 135 million acre⋅ft (167 billion m^{3}), was given to Pakistan.

India received control of roughly 20% of the total water carried by the rivers, while Pakistan received 80%. The treaty allows India to use the water of Western Rivers for limited irrigation use and unlimited non-consumptive uses such as power generation, navigation, floating of property, fish culture, etc. It lays down detailed regulations for India in building projects over the Western Rivers. The preamble of the treaty recognizes the rights and obligations of each country for the optimum water use from the Indus system of rivers in a spirit of goodwill, friendship and cooperation. The treaty is also meant to alleviate Pakistani fears that India could potentially cause floods or droughts in Pakistan, especially during a potential conflict.

The Indus Waters Treaty is considered one of the most successful water sharing endeavours in the world today, even though analysts acknowledge the need to update certain technical specifications and expand the scope of the agreement to address climate change.

On 23 April 2025, following the Pahalgam attack on tourists, the Government of India suspended the treaty, citing national security concerns and alleged Pakistani support for militancy in Indian-administered Kashmir.

== Provisions ==
The treaty classifies the six major rivers of the Indus river basin into two geographical categories: three western rivers – the Indus, the Jhelum and Chenab – and three eastern rivers – the Sutlej, the Beas and the Ravi. Per Article I of IWT, any river/ tributary and its catchment area of the Indus system of rivers that are not part of the other five rivers, is part of the Indus River including its creeks, delta channels, connecting lakes, etc. According to this treaty, the eastern rivers are allocated for exclusive water use by India after the expressly permitted water uses per Article II (1) in Pakistan. Similarly, Pakistan has an exclusive water use of the western rivers after the permitted water uses in India. Article IV (14) of IWT states that any water use developed out of the underutilized waters of another country, will not acquire water use rights due to a lapse of time. Mostly, the treaty resulted in the partitioning of the rivers rather than sharing of their waters.

The treaty included a transition period of 10 years, during which India would supply water to the canals of Pakistan from its eastern rivers until Pakistan was able to build the canal system for utilization of waters from the western rivers. Per Article 5.1 of IWT, India also agreed to make a fixed contribution of UK Pound Sterling 62,060,000 (or 125 metric tons of gold when gold standard was followed) towards the cost of construction of new head-works and canal system for irrigation from western rivers in the Punjab province of Pakistan. This transitory period overlapped with the 1965 Indo-Pak war, during which India continued to supply water and pay annual installments per the agreements in the Treaty.

Both countries agreed in the treaty to exchange data and co-operate in the optimum use of water from the Indus system of rivers. For this purpose, the treaty creates the Permanent Indus Commission, with a commissioner appointed by each country. It would follow the set procedure for adjudicating any future differences and disputes arising over the implementation or interpretation or breach of the treaty. The commission has survived three wars and provides an ongoing mechanism for consultation and conflict resolution through inspection, exchange of data, and visits. The commission is required to meet at least once a year to discuss potential disputes as well as cooperative arrangements for the development of the Indus system of rivers. Per article VIII (8), both commissioners together shall submit an annual report to both countries on its works.

Either party must notify the other of plans to construct any engineering works which would affect the other party and provide data about such works. Salal dam was constructed after entering a mutual agreement by both countries. Tulbul Project is pending for clearance for decades even after protracted discussions between India and Pakistan. In cases of dispute or disagreement, Court of Arbitration or a neutral technical expert respectively is called in for arbitration. Technical expert's ruling was followed for clearing the Baglihar power plant and CoA verdict was followed for clearing the Kishanganga Hydroelectric Plant. Pakistan is claiming violation of the treaty regarding 850 MW Ratle Hydroelectric Plant and asked for the establishment of a CoA whereas India asked for the appointment of a Neutral Expert. India has not yet raised any violation of Article II of IWT by Pakistan though Pakistan is using groundwater for various uses in the basin area of Ravi and Sutlej before these rivers finally cross in to Pakistan. Pakistan also constructed river training works in such a manner to reduce river flooding in its area and enhance flooding in Great Rann of Kutch area of India violating Article IV(3a). Pakistan raising disputes and approaching the CoA against Indian projects, could result in the abolition of the IWT when its provisions are interpreted in detail by the CoA verdicts.

=== Permanent Indus Commission ===
The Permanent Indus Commission (PIC) is a bilateral body comprising representatives from both India and Pakistan, established to oversee and ensure the implementation and management of the provisions set forth in the Indus Waters Treaty (IWT). Its primary role is to facilitate cooperation and address issues concerning the use and allocation of the Indus River system between the two countries.

After prolonged talks between the governments of India and Pakistan, the IWT was signed in September 1960 with World Bank standing guarantee for any dispute resolution. Broadly, according to this treaty, waters of the three western rivers (the Jhelum, the Chenab, and the Indus itself) were allocated to Pakistan, and those of the three eastern rivers (the Ravi, the Beas, and the Sutlej) were allocated to India. All these six rivers together called as Indus System of Rivers (ISR). PIC is the channel of correspondence between the two countries for the purpose of IWT and first step for conflict resolution.

The Commissioner of Pakistan has its web page and some related documents are uploaded to disseminate information to the interested readers. Whereas Commissioner of India does not maintain a web site. However both Commissioners do not make the annual reports accessible online to public to keep the public depend on concocted / vested news.

Since the ratification of the treaty in 1960, India and Pakistan have not engaged in any water wars. Most differences and disputes have been settled via legal procedures, provided for within the framework of the treaty. The treaty is considered to be one of the most successful water sharing endeavors in the world despite two wars and many war like situations between the two countries.

Salal dam was constructed after entering mutual agreement by both countries. Tulbul Project is pending for clearance for decades even after protracted discussions between India and Pakistan. Neutral Expert's ruling was followed for clearing the Baglihar power plant and PCA verdict was followed for clearing the Kishanganga Hydroelectric Plant. Pakistan is claiming violation of the treaty regarding 850 MW Ratle Hydroelectric Plant. India has not yet raised any violation of IWT by Pakistan.

== Background and history ==
The waters of the Indus system of rivers begin mainly in Tibet and the Himalayan mountains in the states of Himachal Pradesh and Jammu and Kashmir. They flow through the states of Punjab and Sindh before emptying into the Arabian Sea south of Karachi and Kori Creek in Gujarat. The average annual available water resource in Pakistan is 164.7 million acre⋅ft (203.1 billion m^{3}). Where once there was only a narrow strip of irrigated land along these rivers, developments over the last century have created a large network of canals and storage facilities that provide water for more than 47 million acres (190,000 km^{2}) in Pakistan alone by 2009, one of the largest irrigated areas of any river system.

The partition of British India, based on religion not on geography basis, created a conflict over the waters of the Indus basin. The newly formed states were at odds over how to share and manage what was essentially a cohesive and unitary network of irrigation. Furthermore, the geography of partition was such that the source rivers of the Indus basin were in India. Pakistan felt its livelihood threatened by the prospect of Indian control over the tributaries that fed water into the Pakistani portion of the basin. Where India certainly had its own ambitions for the profitable development of the basin, Pakistan felt acutely threatened by a conflict over the main source of water for its cultivable land. During the first years of partition, the waters of the Indus were apportioned by the Inter-Dominion Accord of May 4, 1948. This accord required India to release sufficient water through existing canals to the Pakistani regions of the basin in return for annual payments from the government of Pakistan. The accord was meant to meet immediate requirements and was followed by negotiations for a more permanent solution. However, neither side was willing to compromise their respective positions and negotiations reached a stalemate. From the Indian point of view, there was nothing that Pakistan could do to force India to divert, from any of its schemes, the river water into the irrigation canals of Pakistan. Pakistan wanted to take the matter at that time to the International Court of Justice, but India refused, arguing that the conflict required a bilateral resolution.

=== World Bank involvement ===
In 1951, David Lilienthal, formerly the chairman of the Tennessee Valley Authority and of the U.S. Atomic Energy Commission, visited the region to write a series of articles for Collier's magazine. Lilienthal had a keen interest in the subcontinent and was welcomed by the highest levels of both Indian and Pakistani governments. Although his visit was sponsored by Collier's, Lilienthal was briefed by the state department and executive branch officials, who hoped that Lilienthal could help bridge the gap between India and Pakistan and also gauge hostilities on the subcontinent. During the course of his visit, it became clear to Lilienthal that tensions between India and Pakistan were acute, but also unable to be erased with one sweeping gesture. He wrote in his journal:

India and Pakistan were on the verge of war over Kashmir. There seemed to be no possibility of negotiating this issue until tensions abated. One way to reduce hostility . . . would be to concentrate on other important issues where cooperation was possible. Progress in these areas would promote a sense of community between the two nations which might, in time, lead to a Kashmir settlement. Accordingly, I proposed that India and Pakistan work out a program jointly to develop and jointly operate the Indus Basin River system, upon which both nations were dependent for irrigation water. With new dams and irrigation canals, the Indus and its tributaries could be made to yield the additional water each country needed for increased food production. In the article, I suggested that the World Bank might use its good offices to bring the parties to an agreement and help in the financing of an Indus Development program.

Lilienthal's idea was well received by officials at the World Bank (then the International Bank for Reconstruction and Development) and subsequently, by the Indian and Pakistani governments. Eugene R. Black, then president of the World Bank, told Lilienthal that his proposal "makes good sense all round". Black wrote that the Bank was interested in the economic progress of the two countries and had been concerned that the Indus dispute could only be a serious handicap to this development. India's previous objections to third party arbitration were remedied by the Bank's insistence that it would not adjudicate the conflict but rather work as a conduit for agreement.

Black also made a distinction between the "functional" and "political" aspects of the Indus dispute. In his correspondence with Indian and Pakistan leaders, Black asserted that the Indus dispute could most realistically be solved if the functional aspects of disagreement were negotiated apart from political considerations. He envisioned a group that tackled the question of how best to utilize the waters of the Indus Basin, leaving aside questions of historic rights or allocations.

Black proposed a Working Party made up of Indian, Pakistani, and World Bank engineers. The World Bank delegation would act as a consultative group, charged with offering suggestions and speeding dialogue. In his opening statement to the Working Party, Black spoke of why he was optimistic about the group's success:

One aspect of Mr. Lilienthal's proposal appealed to me from the first. I mean his insistence that the Indus problem is an engineering problem and should be dealt with by engineers. One of the strengths of the engineering profession is that, all over the world, engineers speak the same language and approach problems with common standards of judgment.

Black's hopes for a quick resolution to the Indus dispute were premature. While the Bank had expected that the two sides would come to an agreement on the allocation of waters, neither India nor Pakistan seemed willing to compromise their positions. While Pakistan insisted on its historical right to waters of all the Indus tributaries and that half of West Punjab was under threat of desertification, the Indian side argued that the previous distribution of waters should not set future allocation. Instead, the Indian side set up a new basis of distribution, with the waters of the Western tributaries going to Pakistan and the Eastern tributaries to India. The substantive technical discussions that Black had hoped for were stymied by the political considerations he had expected to avoid.

The World Bank soon became frustrated with this lack of progress. What had originally been envisioned as a technical dispute that would quickly untangle itself started to seem intractable. India and Pakistan were unable to agree on the technical aspects of allocation, let alone the implementation of any agreed-upon distribution of waters. Finally, in 1954, after nearly two years of negotiation, the World Bank offered its own proposal, stepping beyond the limited role it had apportioned for itself and forcing the two sides to consider concrete plans for the future of the basin. The proposal offered India the three eastern tributaries of the basin and Pakistan the three western tributaries. Canals and storage dams were to be constructed to divert water from the western rivers and replace the eastern river supply lost by Pakistan.

While the Indian side was amenable to the World Bank proposal, Pakistan found it unacceptable. The World Bank allocated the eastern rivers to India and the western rivers to Pakistan. This new distribution did not account for the historical usage of the Indus basin or the fact that West Punjab's Eastern districts could turn into deserts, and repudiated Pakistan's negotiating position. Where India had stood for a new system of allocation, Pakistan felt that its share of waters should be based on pre-partition distribution. The World Bank proposal was more in line with the Indian plan, and this angered the Pakistani delegation. They threatened to withdraw from the Working Party, and negotiations verged on collapse.

However, neither side could afford the dissolution of talks. The Pakistani press met rumors of an end to negotiation with talk of increased hostilities; the government was ill-prepared to forego talks for a violent conflict with India and was forced to reconsider its position. India was also eager to settle the Indus issue; large development projects were put on hold by negotiations, and Indian leaders were eager to divert water for irrigation. In December 1954, the two sides returned to the negotiating table. The World Bank proposal was transformed from a basis of settlement to a basis for negotiation and the talks continued, stop and go, for the next six years.

One of the last stumbling blocks to an agreement concerning financing for the construction of canals and storage facilities that would transfer water from the western rivers to Pakistan. This transfer was necessary to make up for the water Pakistan was giving up by ceding its rights to the eastern rivers' waters. The World Bank initially planned for India to pay for these works, but India refused. The Bank responded with a plan for external financing. An Indus Basin Development Fund Agreement (Karachi, 19 September 1960) was a treaty between Australia, Canada, West Germany, New Zealand, the United Kingdom, the United States with the International Bank for Reconstruction and Development (IBRD) and Pakistan who agreed to provide Pakistan a combination of funds and loans. This solution cleared the remaining stumbling blocks to the agreement and the IWT was signed by both countries on the same day in 1960 applicable with retrospective effect from 1 April 1960 but "Indus Basin Development Fund Agreement" provisions do not affect the IWT in any way per Article XI(3). After signing the IWT, then prime minister Nehru stated in the parliament that India had purchased a (water) settlement. The grants and loans to Pakistan were extended in 1964 through a supplementary agreement.

=== Grants and loans to Pakistan ===
| Country | Currency | Original Grant (1960) | Supplementary Grant (1964) | Original Loan to Pakistan (1960) | Supplementary Loan to Pakistan (1965) |
|---|---|---|---|---|---|
| India | GB£ | 62,060,000 | | | Ten yearly installments ^{Article 5 of IWT} |
| Australia | AU$ | 6,965,000 | 4,667,666 | | |
| Canada | Can$ | 22,100,000 | 16,810,794 | | |
| West Germany | DM | 126,000,000 | 80,400,000 | | |
| New Zealand | NZ£ | 1,000,000 | 503,434 | | |
| United Kingdom | GB£ | 20,860,000 | 13,978,571 | | |
| United States of America | US$ | 177,000,000 | 118,590,000 | 0 | 0 |
| IBRD | US$ | | | 0 (in various currencies) inc interest | 0 (in various currencies) |

Presently, the World Bank's role in the treaty is limited to keep the dispute settlement process moving when a party/country is not cooperating to follow the arbitration procedure given in the treaty in case of a dispute.

== Implications ==
From the Indus System of Rivers, India received nearly 33 million acre⋅ft (41 billion m^{3}) (16%) while Pakistan received nearly 177 million acre⋅ft (218 billion m^{3}) (84%). However India can use the western rivers water for irrigation up to 701,000 acres with new water storage capacity not exceeding 1.25 million acre⋅ft (1.54 billion m^{3}) and new storage works with hydropower plants (excluding permitted water storage under unlimited run of the river hydro projects) with storage not exceeding 1.6 million acre⋅ft (2.0 billion m^{3}) and nominal flood storage capacity of 0.75 million acre⋅ft (0.93 billion m^{3}). These water allocations made to the Jammu and Kashmir state of India are meager to meet its irrigation water requirements whereas the treaty permitted enough water to irrigate 80.52% of the cultivated lands in the Indus river basin of Pakistan. Though any number of Run-of-River (RoR) hydropower projects can be built by India, the operating pool of a RoR project is of restricted capacity to limit the water storage during the lean flow duration. However, surcharge storage behind the gated spillway in a RoR project is not limited which is useful to store water during the monsoon season for optimum secondary power generation. Due to meagre permitted storage, J&K state is bound to resort to costly de-silting of its reservoirs to keep them operational. According to the Strategic Foresight Group, Pakistan is also losing additional benefits by not permitting moderate water storage in the upstream J&K state, whose water would ultimately be released to Pakistan during lean flow periods in the winter season for its use and to reduce the need for a few dams within its own territory. Whereas Pakistan is planning to build multi-purpose water reservoirs with massive storage for impounding multi-year inflows, (Note: They include 4,500 MW Diamer-Bhasha Dam, 3,600 MW Kalabagh Dam, 600 MW Akhori Dam, 4,320 MW Dasu Dam, 7,100 MW Bunji Dam, 4,866 MW Thakot dam, 2,400 MW Patan dam, 15,000 MW Katzarah Dam, 700 MW Azad Pattan dam, 884 MW Suki Kinari dam, etc.) in case of any dam break, downstream areas in Pakistan as well as Kutch region in India would face unprecedented water deluge or submergence as these dams are located in highly active seismic zones.

However, India derives a military advantage from the IWT as its scope is confined to the Indus system of rivers (both eastern and western rivers) basin area located in India and only Ravi and Sutlej basins located in Pakistan per Articles II (1 to 4) and III (2 to 3) and the IWT deals only with the sharing of water available/flowing in the Indian part between Pakistan and India. As per the IWT, Pakistan bombing / destroying dams, barrages, power stations, etc. located in Indian part of the Indus system of rivers is violation of the IWT which can lead to abrogation of IWT.

== Scrutiny ==
=== Drainage in Kutch ===
The Indus River water also flows into the Kori Creek, located in Rann of Kutch area of Gujarat state in India, through its delta channel called Nara River via Shakoor Lake before joining the sea. Without the consent of India, from 1987 to 1997 Pakistan constructed the Left Bank Outfall Drain (LBOD) project passing through the Great Rann of Kutch area with assistance from the World Bank. In violation of IWT Article IV(10), the LBOD's purpose is to prevent the saline and polluted water flow into the Indus delta of Pakistan and divert to reach the sea via the Rann of Kutch area. Water released by the LBOD enhances the flooding in India and contaminates the quality of water bodies which are a source of water to salt farms spread over a vast area. The LBOD water is passing to the sea via the disputed Sir Creek which is held by India up to its centre line but claimed by Pakistan totally, and LBOD water also enters into Indian territory due to many breaches in its left bank caused by floods. Since Gujarat state of India being the lower most riparian part of the Indus basin, Pakistan is bound to provide all the details of engineering works taken up by Pakistan to India to ensure no material damage is caused to India as per the provisions of Article IV of the treaty and shall not proceed with the project works till the disagreements are settled by arbitration process.

== Recent developments ==
=== Aftermath of Uri attack ===
In the aftermath of the 2016 Uri attack, India threatened to revoke the Indus Waters Treaty. Prime Minister Narendra Modi declared, "blood and water cannot flow together." India decided to restart the Tulbul Project on the Jhelum River in the Kashmir Valley, which was previously suspended in response to Pakistan's objections. Political analyst Hasan Askari Rizvi in Lahore said that any change to the water supply of Pakistan would have a "devastating impact". India also decided to suspend the meetings of the Permanent Indus Commission (PIC) indefinitely. India stated in February 2020 that it wants to follow the IWT in letter and spirit. The mandatary annual meeting of the IWT Commissioners became irregular after the 2019 Pulwama attack. The last meeting of the Permanent Indus Commission (PIC) took place in May 2022. The May 2022 meeting was the 118th meeting of the PIC.

=== Complete utilization efforts by India ===
The Indus system of rivers carries nearly 210 million acre⋅ft (260 billion m^{3}) average annual flows, of which India is able to utilize nearly 31 million acre⋅ft (38 billion m^{3}) (15% of the total) from the three Eastern Rivers. Water available above the rim (river input monitoring) stations (7 million acre⋅ft (8.6 billion m^{3}) at Madhopur headworks in Ravi basin, 13 million acre⋅ft (16 billion m^{3}) at Mandi Plain/Harike headworks in Beas basin and 14 million acre⋅ft (17 billion m^{3}) at Ropar headworks in Sutlej basin) is 34 million acre⋅ft (42 billion m^{3}) which excludes the water available in the downstream areas of these rim stations. Excluding the flood water released into the downstream Ravi River from the Madhopur headworks, additionally 4.549 million acre⋅ft (5.611 billion m^{3}) water in an average year is available between Madhopur headworks and the final crossing point (Ravi siphon) into Pakistan which is not yet put to use by India and flowing additionally into Pakistan. Also flood water flows into Pakistan from Hussainiwala headworks which is the terminal barrage across the Sutlej River in India. In addition, India is entitled to use Western River's waters for limited agricultural uses and unlimited domestic, non-consumptive, hydropower generation, etc. uses.

As of 2019, India utilizes 31 million acre⋅ft (38 billion m^{3}) of its share, and nearly 7.5 million acre⋅ft (9.3 billion m^{3}) of India's unutilized share flows to downstream Pakistan territory from Ravi and Sutlej main rivers. India does not lose right over this water which is let flow into Pakistan per Articles II (1 and 4) of IWT and Pakistan shall not use this water for any purpose. There is scope for cooperation between both countries to supply this water to the Kutch region of India via Pakistan rivers, Sukkur Barrage pond and Nara delta channel to Shakoor Lake. From Shakoor Lake, India can pump the water to uplands for irrigation, aquaculture, afforestation, etc. purposes. Such cooperation would also reduce the impact of frequent floods in the Kutch region of Pakistan. Another solution is that India would divert the water of Chenab River to the Eastern Rivers in lieu of waters of Eastern Rivers crossing into Pakistan by constructing diversion tunnels like Marhu Tunnel proposed during the IWT negotiations. The water transfer tunnels would also substantially enhance the hydropower generation from the existing power stations on Ravi and Beas rivers which is permitted by the provisions of IWT.

India is undertaking three projects to utilize its full share of the Eastern Rivers, (a) Shahpurkandi dam project on the Ravi River which was completed in 2024 (b) Makaura Pattan Barrage across Ravi River under the second Ravi-Beas link in Punjab and (c) the Ujh Dam project on Ujh River in Jammu and Kashmir. This water will be used by Punjab along with northern hill states.

In 2021, many small hydroelectric projects totalling to 144 MW in Indus basin had been certified as compliant with the treaty by the Indian Central Water Commission, with the project information passed over to Pakistan.

=== Renegotiation demands ===
In 2003, Jammu and Kashmir state assembly passed a unanimous resolution for the abrogation of the treaty, and again in June 2016, the Jammu and Kashmir assembly demanded revision of the Indus Water Treaty. The growth in irrigated land and hydropower development is not satisfactory due to the restrictions imposed by the IWT in Jammu and Kashmir. The legislators feel that the treaty trampled upon the rights of the people and treats the state of Jammu and Kashmir as a non-entity. A public interest petition has been pending since 2016 in the Supreme Court of India seeking to declare the treaty as unconstitutional.

Since the Indus Waters Treaty has no exit clause, any Indian move to withdraw or amend it must follow principles from the Vienna Convention on the Law of Treaties, which, though not ratified by India or Pakistan, is seen as customary international law. Article 56 requires at least 12 months' notice before withdrawal from such treaties. In January 2023, India formally notified Pakistan of its desire to modify the treaty, in line with these international legal norms.

In 2023, India officially notified Pakistan to renegotiate the treaty, alleging that it was repeatedly indulging in actions that are against the spirit and objective of the treaty. Pakistan has responded to the notice issued by India stating Pakistan can not take risk of abrogating IWT being a lower riparian party and expressed its desire to adhere to the procedures stipulated in the IWT.

India has not appointed the two judges of the Court of Arbitration (CoA) jury from its side as it had considered simultaneous proceedings of CoA and Neutral Expert (NE) as a violation of the IWT agreement and customary international law. The Court decided that it would consider India's objection and decide the competence of the Court as a preliminary matter in an expedited proceeding by the end of June 2023. CoA announced its partial verdict on 6 July 2023 stating that constitution of CoA on the changed request of Pakistan is valid under the provisions of IWT and it would only take up the disputes which are not in the domain of the neutral expert to avoid simultaneous proceedings on same matters by both CoA and neutral expert. In January 2025, NE delivered an initial verdict stating that NE is fully competent per terms of IWT to adjudicate the differences raised by India. The award of the NE is expected by the end of 2026. In January, 2025, Jammu and Kashmir State initiated planning activities of Kishanganga II (40 MW) project.

In September 2024, India formally sought review of the Treaty and at the same time Pakistan reaffirmed the importance of the agreement and requested that India would continue to comply with the provisions of the Treaty.

=== Suspension ===
On 23 April 2025, following a terrorist attack near Pahalgam in Kashmir, the Government of India declared the suspension of the treaty with Pakistan citing national security concerns. The World Bank said it would not intervene in the dispute as its role in the treaty was limited to that of a facilitator. Additionally, India has also maintained that Hague-based Permanent Court Of Arbitration "has no jurisdiction" on its "sovereign decisions."

Following the suspension of the treaty, India decided to stop the flow of water on the Chenab River from the Baglihar Dam as a "short-term punitive action". It also decided to carry out reservoir flushing in order to boost the reservoir holding capacity of Salal and Baglihar projects. These actions were done off-season, in violation of the treaty provisions, without informing Pakistan. There were social media rumours of these actions causing floods in Pakistan. They were denied by Pakistan's Water and Power Development Authority, which said that the water levels were normal for the season.

Pakistan has reportedly warned that any attempt by India to disrupt the flow of water from shared rivers could be considered an act of war, and that it could attack India with nuclear weapons.

The former Foreign Minister of Pakistan, Bilawal Bhutto Zardari, has hinted at war on at least two occasions. In June 2025, following India's suspension of the Indus Waters Treaty over alleged Pakistani links to the Pahalgam attack, Bilawal warned that Pakistan would "secure all six rivers" if water was not shared fairly. In August, at a Sindh government event, he reiterated that continued Indian actions perceived as "treaty violations" could compel Pakistan to consider war.

On 10 August 2025, during a black-tie dinner in Tampa, Florida, Pakistan's Chief of Army Staff Asim Munir reportedly warned that Pakistan would destroy any future dam built by India with "ten missiles" and stated that the Indus River is not India's "family property."

In June 2026, the Indian EAM S. Jaishankar said the treaty would stay suspended "until Pakistan completely stops cross-border terrorism." Later that month, India's minister of water resources CR Patil confirmed that the treaty would still be kept in abeyance. In response, Pakistan's defence minister Khawaja Asif reiterated Pakistan government's stance and threatened to go to war. Reacting to Asif's comment, India's MEA spokesperson Randhir Jaiswal said, "Such remarks are desperate attempts by Pakistan to cover up its own failings and divert attention away from its human rights abuses" while categorically rejecting "fabricated claims with the contempt they deserve."

On 31 August 2026, while rejecting Permanent Court of Arbitration's rulings, the Indian side reiterated that it had "consistently maintained that the very establishment of this alleged arbitral body constitutes a grave violation of the Indus Waters Treaty."

== See also ==
- India–Pakistan relations
- Indo-Pakistani water dispute of 1948
- Indus River System Authority
- Irrigation in India
- Rivers of Jammu and Kashmir
- Water conflict
- Water politics
