= Sindri Fort =

Coordinates: 24.0629°N 69.0550°E

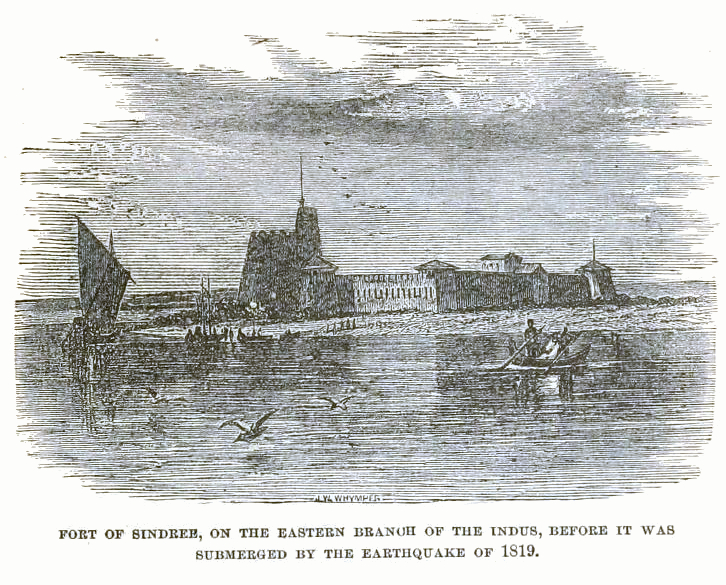
Appearance of Sindhri Fort prior to 1819

Sindri Fort (Sindree in old literature) was a fort lying on the eastern historic Nara River (not to be confused with the present-day smaller Nara river in Kutch), an eastern arm of the Indus River upstream of Lakhpat in the Indian state of Gujarat. It lay in the low flat region of the Rann of Kutch and was partly destroyed and submerged in an earthquake on 16 June 1819. The region where it stood subsided (sank) during the earthquake. The rapid changes in the landscape of the region were used as an example of geological change by Charles Lyell in his 1830 Principles of Geology, at a time when the Earth was seen as having been unchanged since creation.

It is now submerged in the Sindri lake.

== Location ==
Located south of Allah Bund, the fort is approximately 50 km (30 miles) upstream from the 18th century Lakhpat Fort in India; about 30 km (20 miles) downstream from Ali Bunder and about 75 km (45 miles) downstream from Badin in present-day Pakistan.

== History ==
=== Construction ===
The Sindri Fort (also known as Sindree Fort) was built in the mid-18th century (roughly around 1762) by the Rulers of Kutch (the Hindu Jadeja Raos of Kutch) as a strategic frontier post and customs house to monitor river trade and manage the border with the Kalhora dynasty (r: 1701–1783 AD) rulers of Sindh. Historical sketches from 1808 show it was a fortification consisting of a single high tower (approx. 50–60 feet) and an elevated tract of about 150 square yards, all enclosed by a 20-foot high wall situated on the eastern bank of the Nara River (an eastern branch of the Indus), which was then a fertile, rice-growing region.

=== Destruction in battle and rebuilding ===
The pentagon-shaped fort was also a site of territorial disputes between the Hindu Princes of Kutch and the Muslim rulers of Sindh, the fort was partially destroyed by the later before it was eventually reclaimed, rebuilt and maintained by the Hindu rulers of Kutch State.

=== 1819 earthquake destruction and aftermath ===
Sindri fort was partly damaged by an earthquake in June 1819 and the land in the region subsided and was submerged by rushing waters. Some of the people who lived in the fort climbed up a tower and were saved by boats. A strip of land running for fifty miles and lying five miles from the fort rose up after the earthquake to form an embankment. This strip was noticed by the people at the fort and named as "Allah bund" or the mound/embankment of Allah or God. The Indus river changed its course gradually after the earthquake and cut through the newly created bund.

Allah bund is now thought to indicate a fault line. When Alexander Burnes visited the site in 1828 he found a single tower rising above the water. The catastrophic change in the landscape was used as an example of geological change by Charles Lyell in his landmark Principles of Geology (1832). Ignatius Donnelly used the destruction and submergence of Sindri Fort as support for the possibility of Atlantis in his 1882 book Atlantis: The Antediluvian World.

== Present status ==
In February 2010, P.S. Thakker of ISRO's Space Applications Centre (SAC) at Ahmedabad, while reviewing the Google Earth images as a hobby, noticed the partially submerged ruins of Sindri fort. It is still visible sometimes specially during the droughts.

== Gallery ==
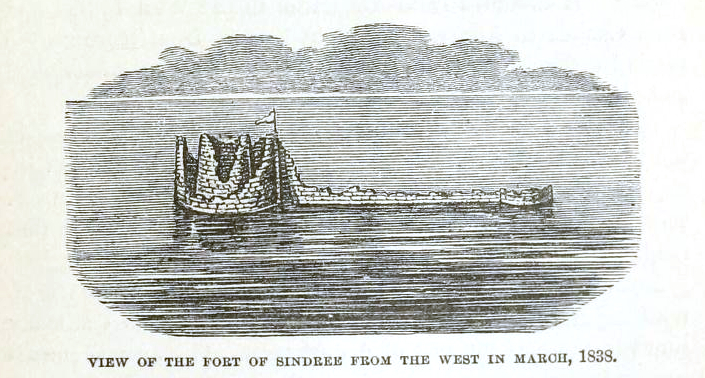
Remains of Sindhri fort in 1838

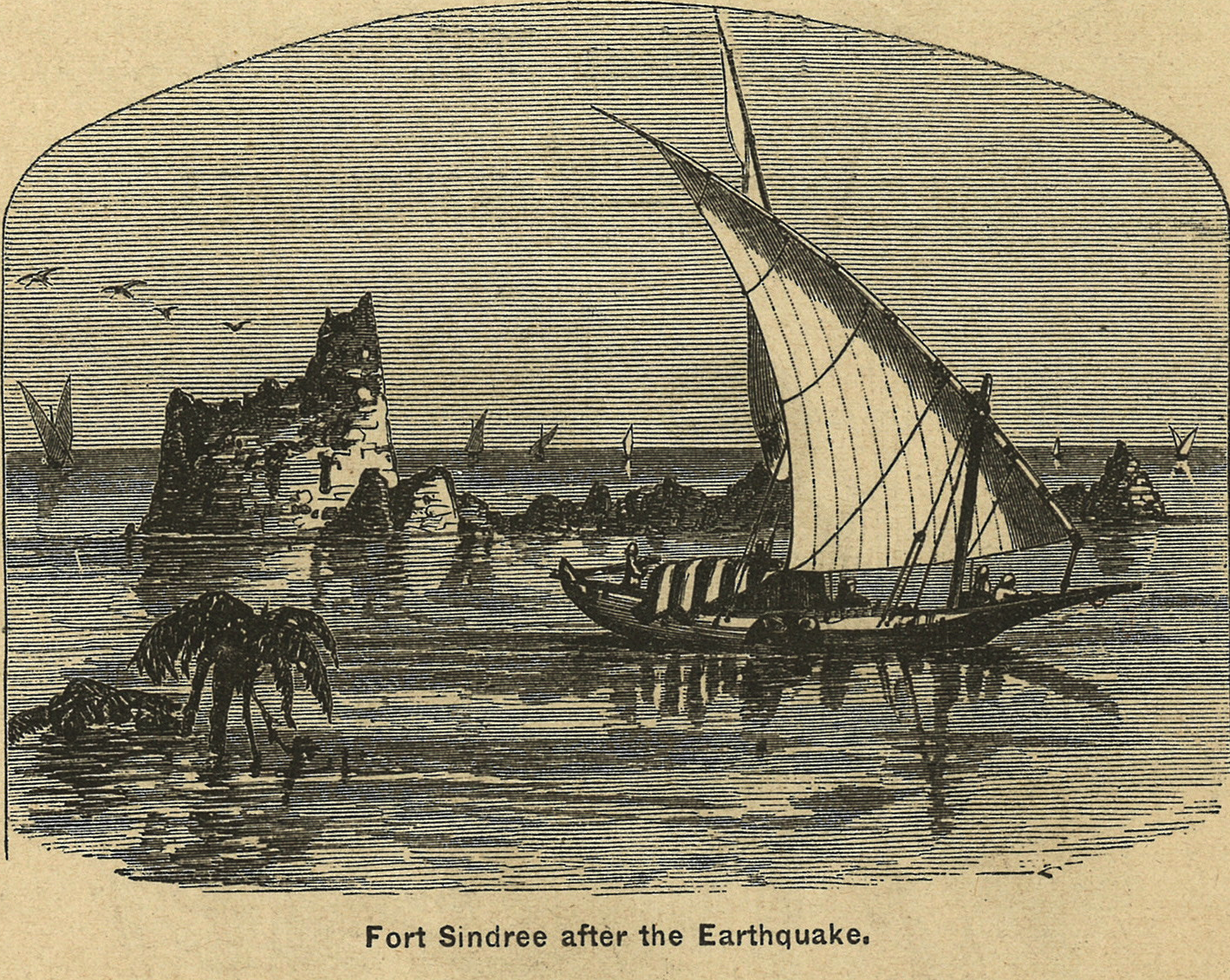
Fort Sindree after earthquake

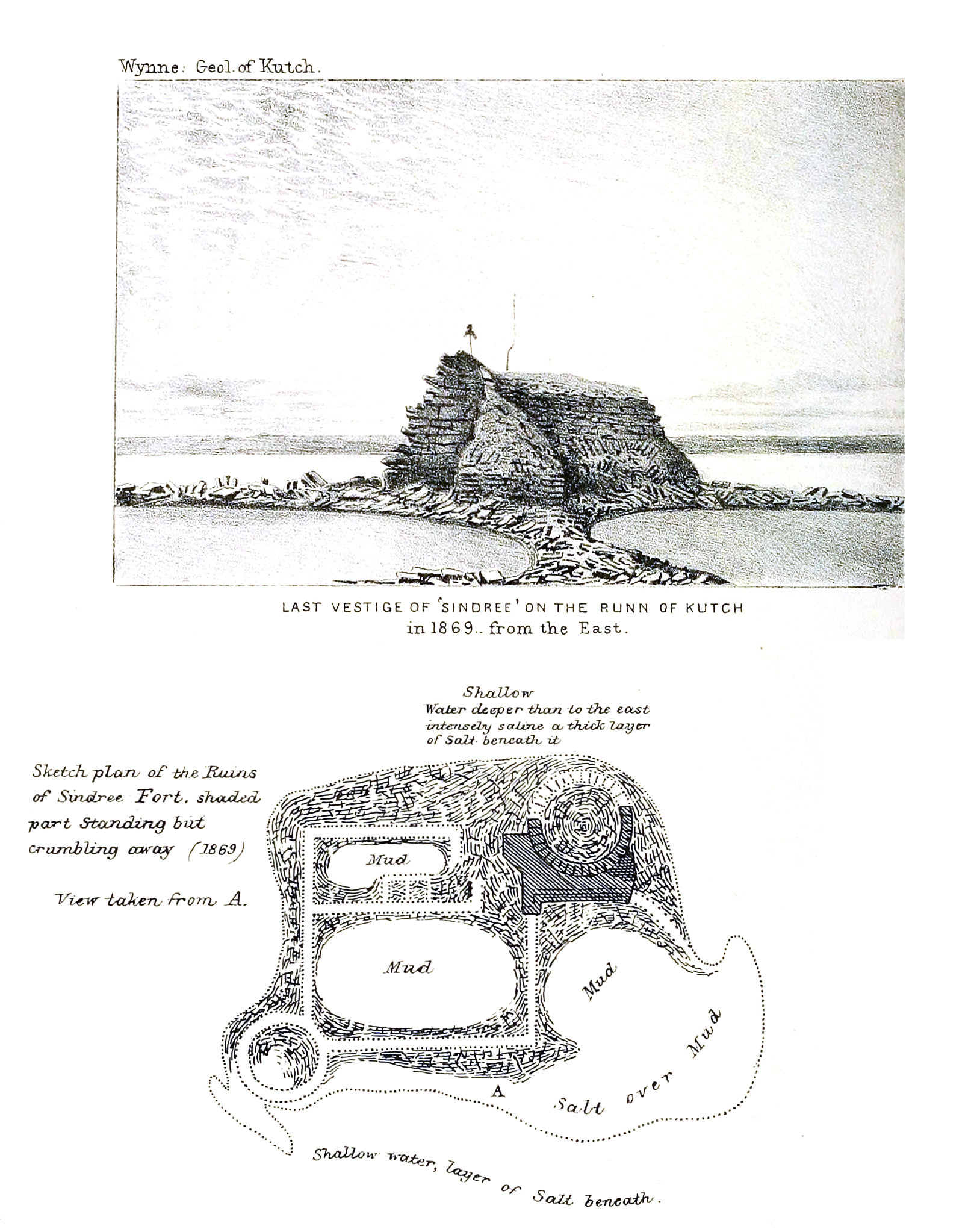
Ruins in 1869 as seen by Arthur Beavor Wynne

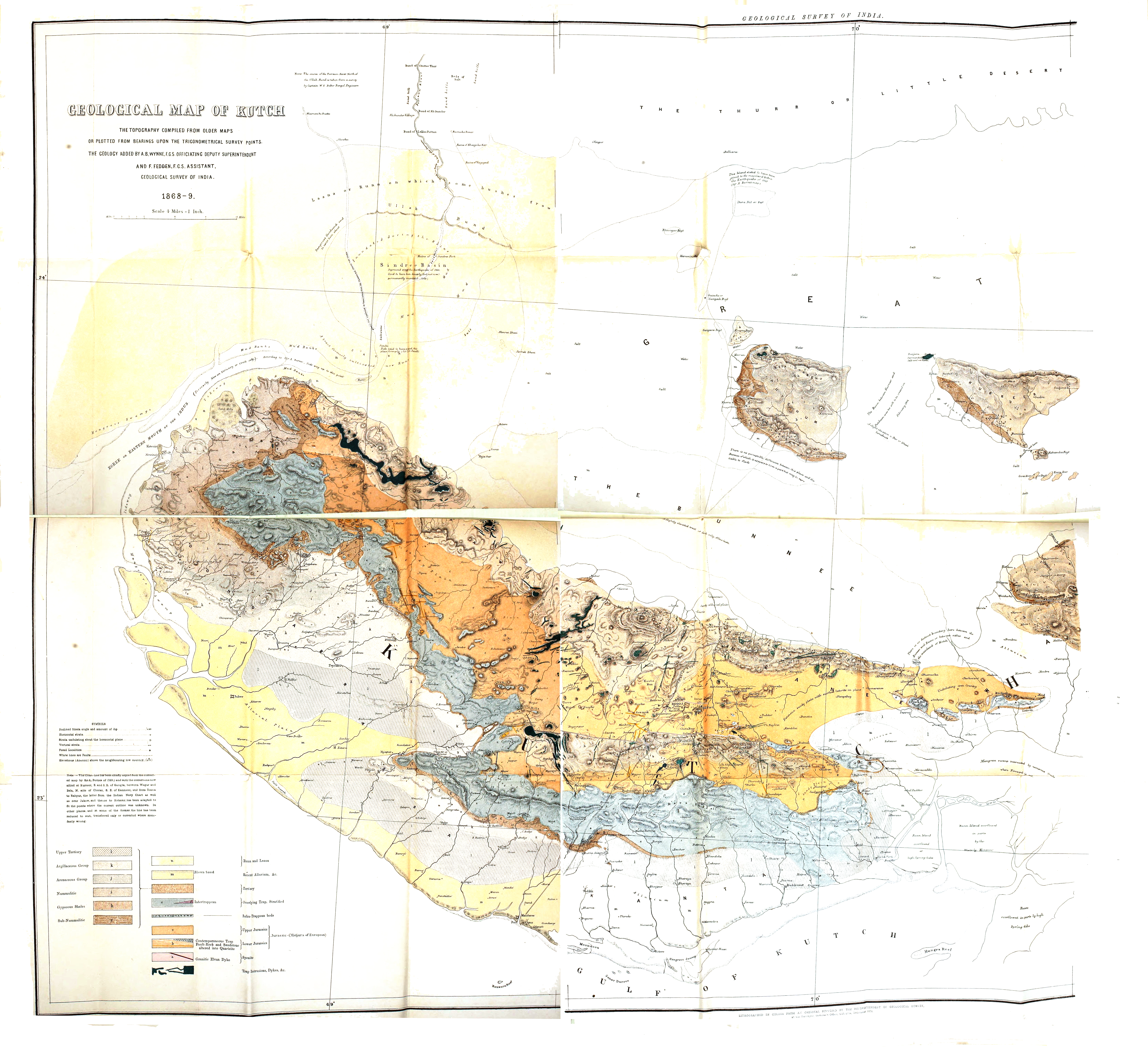
Geological map of the region

== See also ==
- Sir Creek
- Nara River (India)
