= Shakoor Lake =

Lake in India and Pakistan

- Interactive map of Shakoor Lake
- Coordinates: 24.219°N 69.081°E
- Surface area: 300 km^{2} (120 sq mi)

Shakoor Lake is a lake, comprising 300 km^{2}, located on the border between the Indian state of Gujarat and the Sindh province on the southern edge of Pakistan. About 90 km^{2} of the lake lies within Pakistan, whilst the majority of the lake, i.e. 210 km^{2}, is in India. The Indian built Indo-Pak Border Road runs across the Shakoor Lake and it is joined by the Indian GJ SH 45 State Highway just east of the lake, at the Kanjarkot Fort.

During the 2010 Pakistan floods, a controversial decision was made to release saline water and effluent into Shakoor Lake to alleviate pressure on the Left Bank Outfall Drain (LBOD) in Badin, Pakistan.

== Origin ==
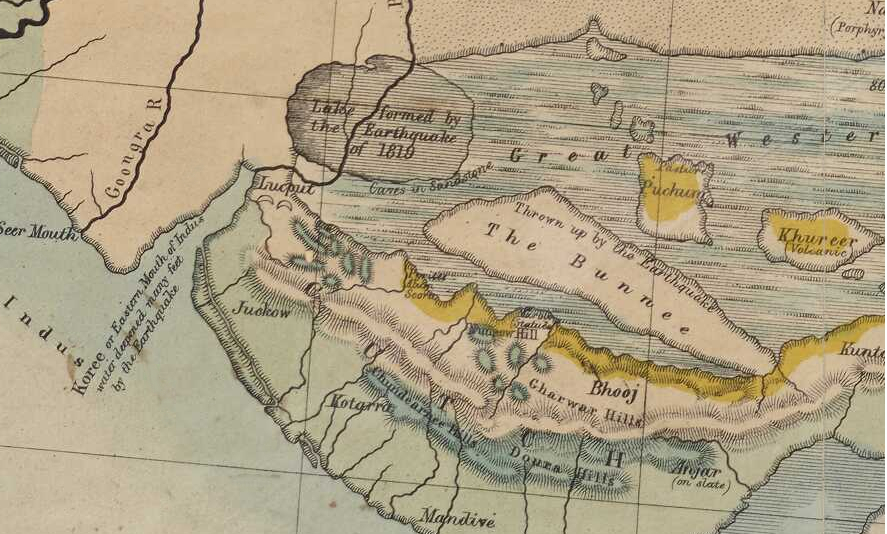
1854 map of the region by George Bellas Greenough. In this map, "Shakoor Lake" is marked by the words "Lake formed by the earthquake of 1819", "Canes in sandstone" refer to the Carnian pluvial-era fossilised reed in sandstone often referred to as "Schilfsandstein" in geological literature, "Allah Bund" is marked by "The Bunee", south of which is Bhuj Formation (containing "Gharwar Hills", "Doura Hills", "Chundearnee Hills", etc.).

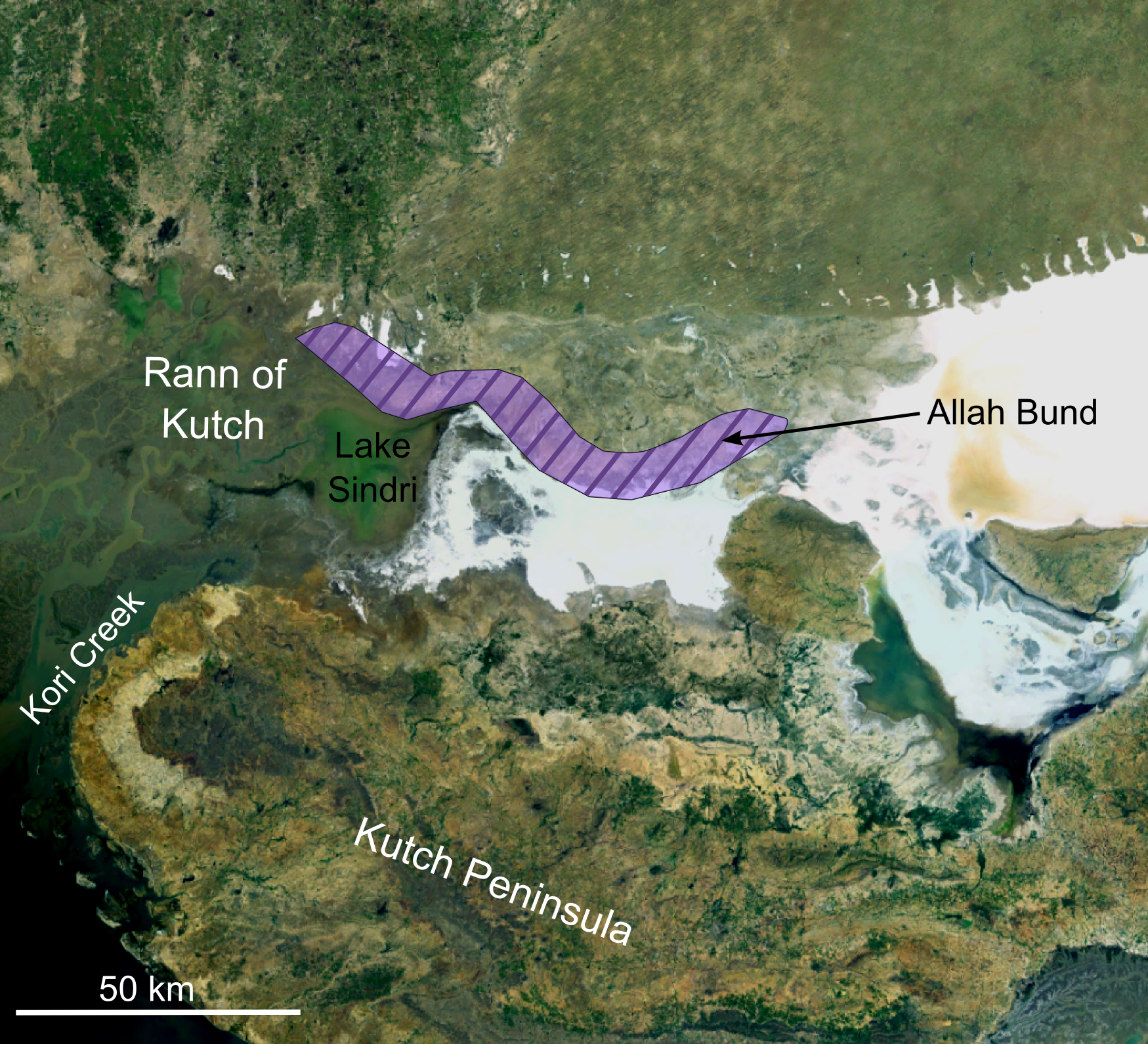
Satellite photo showing location of the Allah Bund.

During the 1819 Rann of Kutch earthquake, the emergence of Allah Bund blocked the Nara river (also known as Puran river or Kori river) forming the Shakor Lake on the upstream/northern side of the Allah Bund and Sindri Lake (located at 24°02′11″N 69°05′59″E) on the downstream/southern side of the Allah Bund. Now, during the river flooding, Shakoor lake surpluses into the Sindri Lake and then into Kori Creek through the gaps formed in Allah Bund. Geographically and environmentally, Lake Shakoor is part of the cross-border Rann of Kutch, a large seasonal salt marsh and a Global 200 Ecoregion.

== Environmental concerns ==
The way water retention and salt extraction have been practiced in the Rann of Kutch region, is causing, and has already caused, devastating effects on the local environment; reducing the natural wildlife population, drying up and deforesting jungle habitats and mangroves, and threatening the entire regional ecosystem. In Lake Shakoor, salt extraction has been seen as the main culprit in this regard.

== Border disputes ==
The Shakoor Lake area became involved in the "Kutch Dispute" in the 1960s, when Pakistani forces entered the area with a tank division and fortified the Kanjar Kot Fort. The Kutch dispute then became part of the long-running and continuing border disputes between India and Pakistan, but it originated in the 1910s between the Bombay Presidency and the Princely State of Cutch, thus predating the creation of India and Pakistan. The borders in the Kutch Region was finally settled and effectuated on February 19, 1968, when both sides accepted the award of the Indo-Pakistan Western Boundary case Tribunal designated by the UN secretary general. Sir Creek in the southwest of Great Rann of Kutch is still disputed though.

== See also ==
- 1819 Rann of Kutch earthquake
- Chotiari Dam
- Nara Canal system

== Sources and external links ==
- Ecoregions of Pakistan WWF
- "The looming disaster"
- Google Maps for the lake
