= Wild cats in Sindh =

The Province of Sindh

The Pakistani province of Sindh has been home to multiple species of felid. These include the domestic cat (both house cats and ferals), of the species Felis catus; medium-sized wild cats from the genus Felis, such as the jungle cat (Felis chaus); and big cats from the genus Panthera, such as leopards (Panthera pardus). Wild cats like the caracal (Caracal caracal), known for their agility and tufted ears, also inhabit the region. Among these, domestic cats vastly outnumber their wild relatives, which are often elusive and face threats from habitat loss and human-wildlife conflict.

These groups collectively represent the diversity of wild cats in Sindh, an essential component of its ecological and cultural heritage.

== Tiger ==
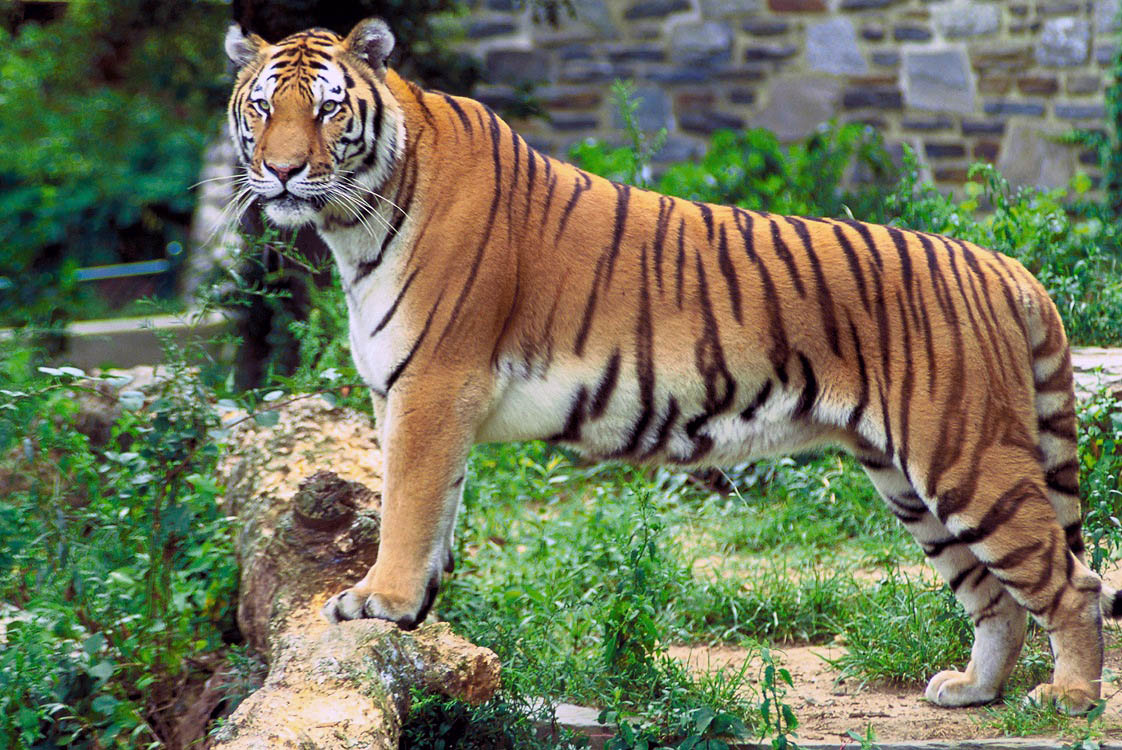
The Bengal Tiger

Tigers (Sindhi:واگهه) were present in what is now Sindh until the early 20th century, with their extinction around 1906 and sporadic sightings until 1933. They were once common in regions like Khairpur and Sukkur districts of Sindh. Reports of tigers causing destruction are scarce; in Lower Sindh, they were virtually unheard of. In Upper Sindh, however, tigers would occasionally emerge from dense Tamarisk thickets and tall grass along riverbanks, venturing into cultivated areas to prey on stray cattle.

== Leopard ==
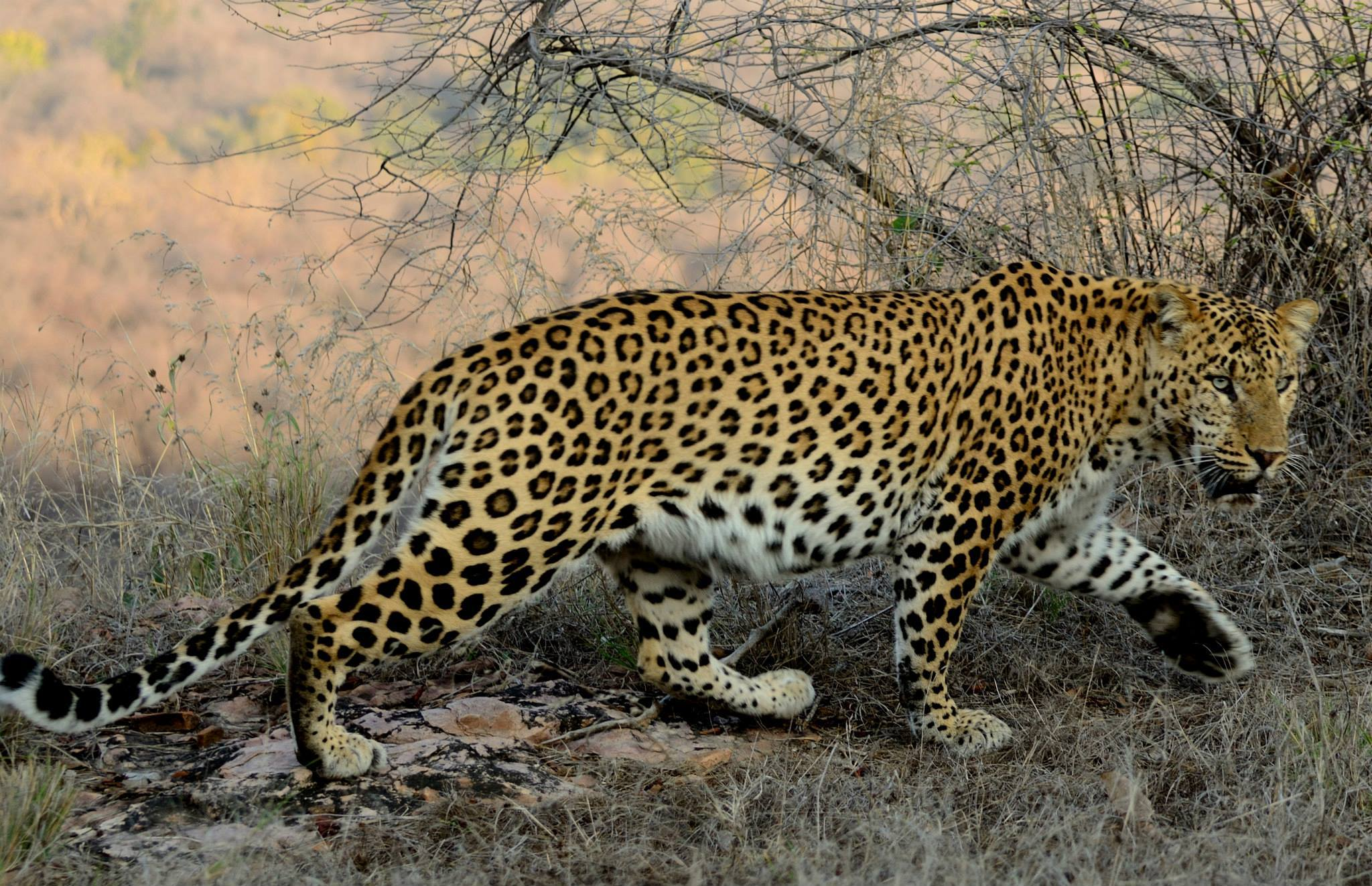
The Indian Leopard

Leopards (Sindhi:چٽرن وارو چِيتو) have lived in the high lands of Sindh like Kirthar Ranges and Karoonjhar Mountains. They are uncommon in Sindh, and share prey populations with cheetahs. In the hills approaching the Indus, both species prey on the gazelle or ravine deer. Of the two, leopards are larger threats to farmers, as they often hide during the day in high jowaree fields, while cheetahs seldom emerge from the hills. Leopards are known to prey on domestic animals such as sheep, goats, and dogs. The common leopard is listed as protected and illegal to hunt in provincial laws of Sindh which can result in punishment of five years in prison and Rs 1.2 million fine. Leopards have been hunted to close to extinction either as trophies or as pests by hunters.

== Fishing cat ==
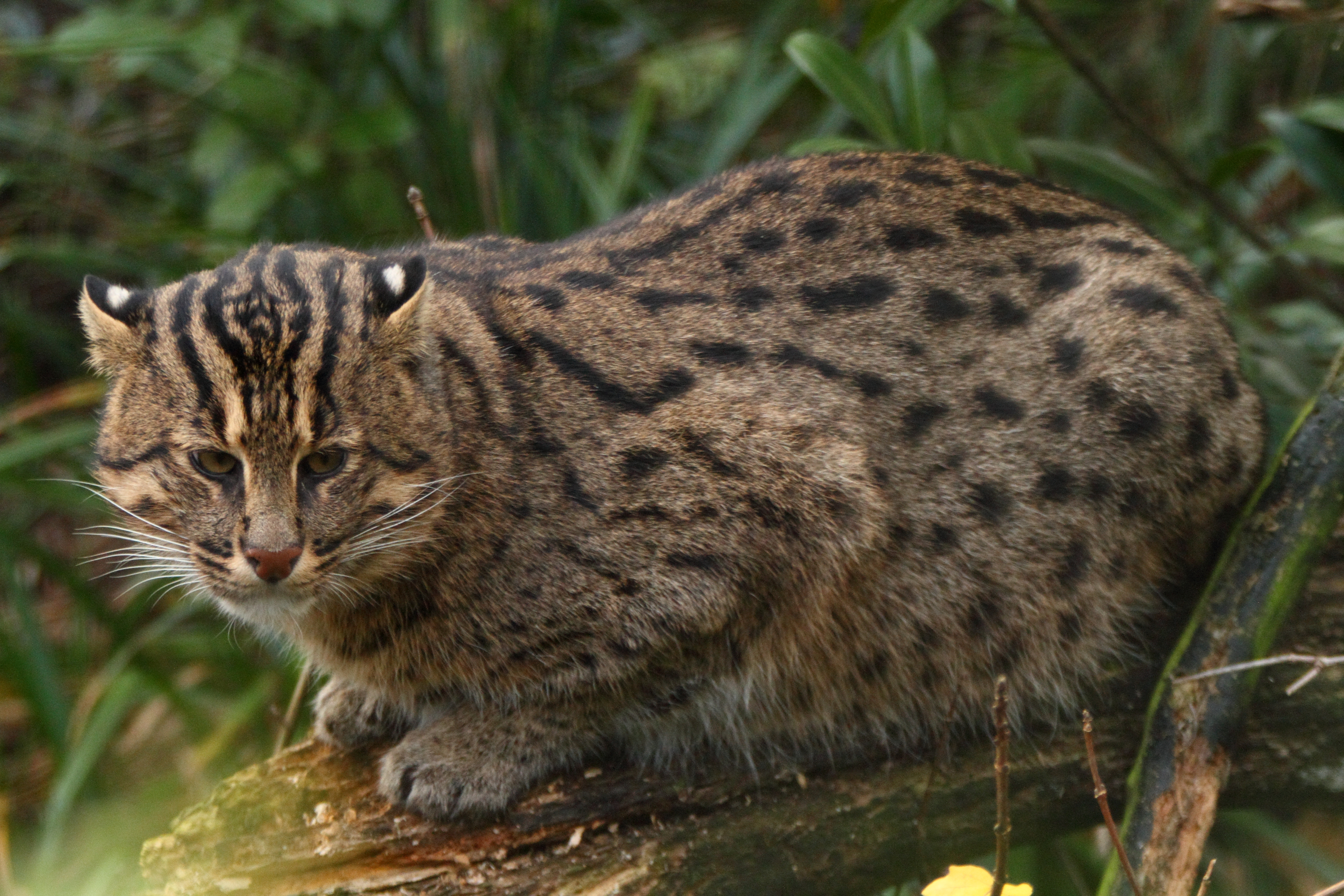
The fishing cat is a species of medium-sized wild cat of South and South East Asia.

The fishing cat (Sindhi: پيرنگ) is widely but irregularly found across South and Southeast Asia. It mainly thrives in lush wetlands near slow-moving waters like swamps and marshes. These include low-salinity zones like oxbow lakes, and high-salinity areas like tidal creeks and mangroves. It hides along these waters within thick vegetation such as forests, scrublands, reed beds, and grasslands. Most sightings are from lowland regions. In 2012, it was spotted near the Chotiari Dam in Sindh.

== Asiatic wildcat ==
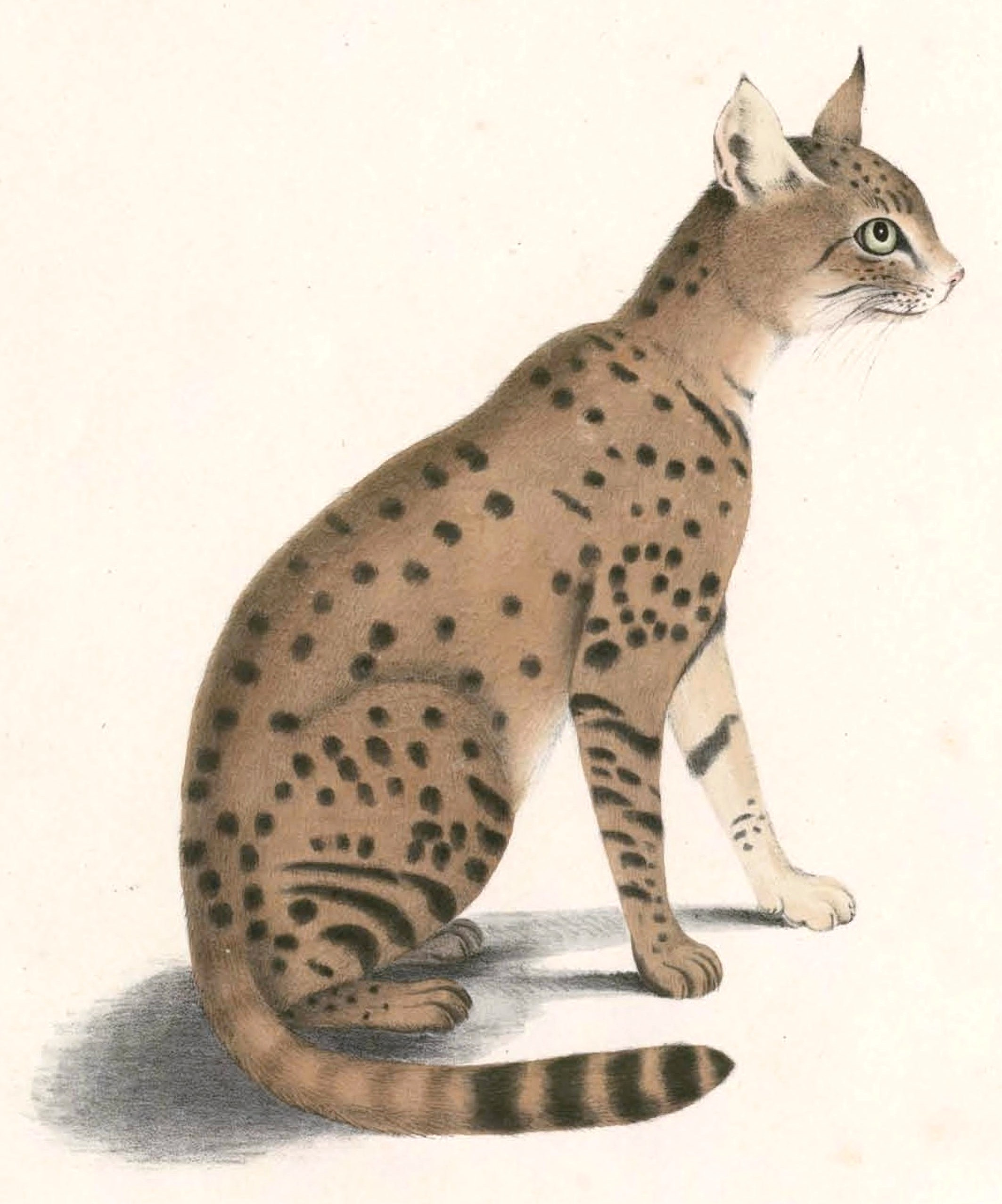
llustration of an Indian desert wildcat from Thomas Hardwicke's collection

The Asiatic wildcat (Sindhi: ٿري ٻلي/جھنگ جي ٻلي)is a subspecies of the African wildcat. It inhabits arid and semi-arid regions, including deserts and scrublands, across Pakistan, India, Iran, and Central Asia. In Sindh, it likely exists in areas with suitable habitats, such as scrub deserts and thorny vegetation near water bodies. These cats are adapted to drier environments, relying on prey like rodents, birds, and reptiles for both sustenance and hydration. In Sindh, wildcats exhibit pale sandy-yellow coats adorned with small spots, which often align in vertical patterns along their trunks and flanks. Common nearly throughout the Province, in gardens, grass thickets, &c., and occasionally on the river banks^ It does much mischief in poultry yards, and has been known to carry away rabbits insecurely penned. Commonly its chief food consists of field rats, and such game as it can secure among birds.

== Jungle cat ==
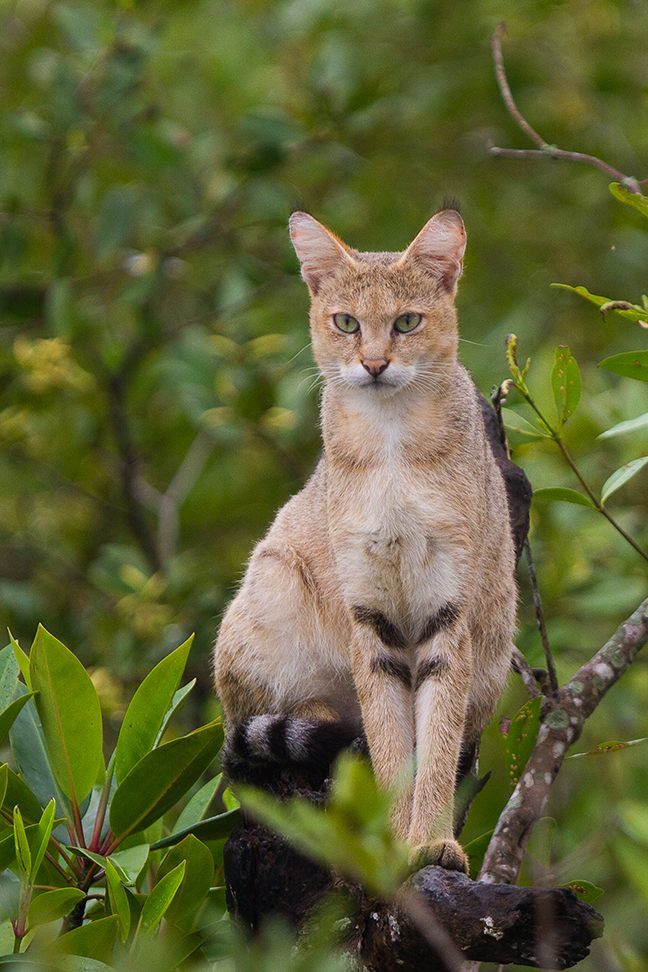
An Indian Jungle Cat

The jungle cat (Felis chaus) (Sindhi:بن جي ٻلي), is a medium-sized cat native to South and Southeast Asia. It inhabits foremost wetlands like swamps, littoral and riparian areas with dense vegetation. In the 1930s, Pocock newly described six larger skins from Sind as F. c. prateri.

== Lynx ==
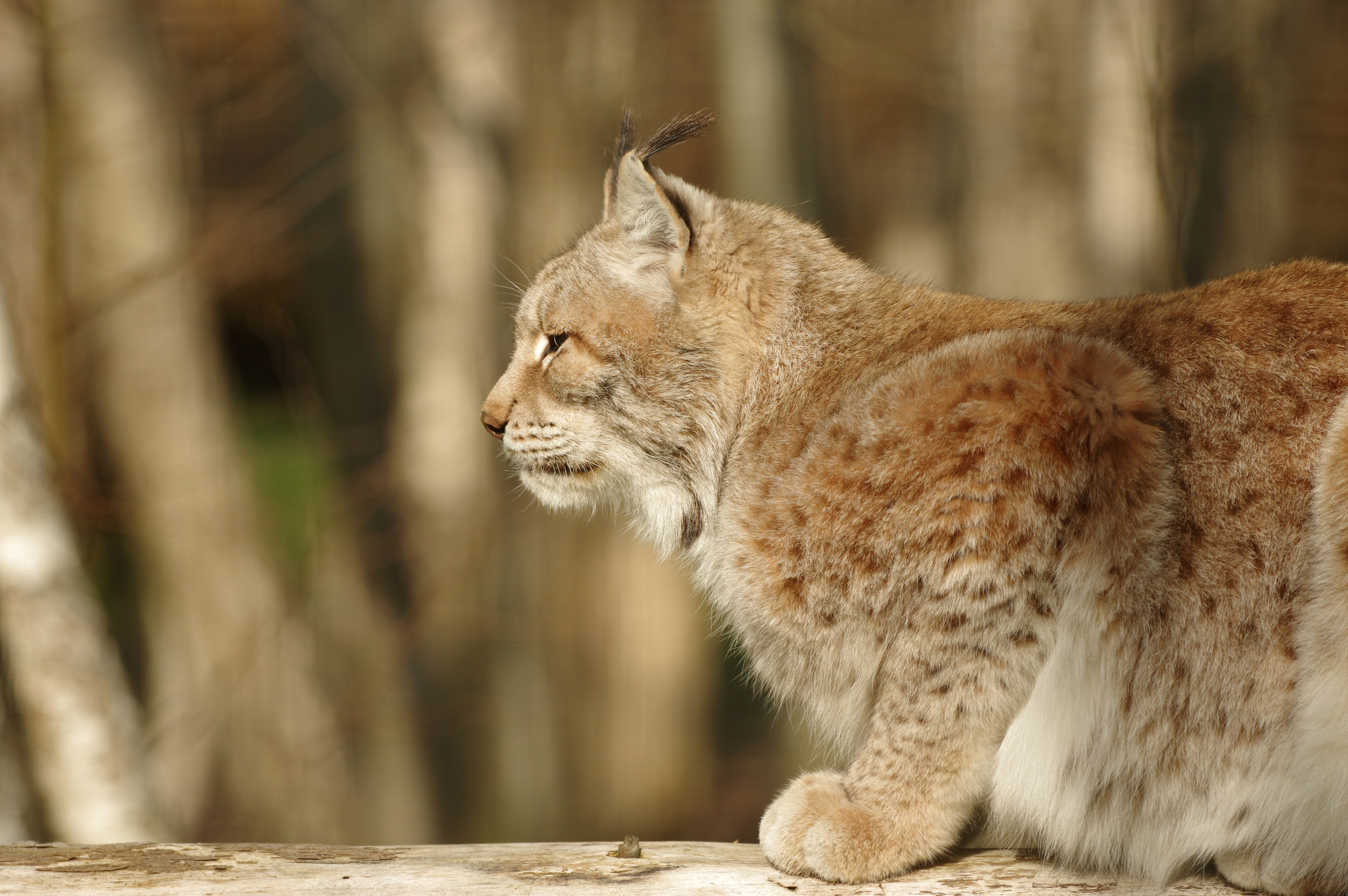
A Eurasian Lynx

James A. Murray stated in 1884 that lynxes (Sindhi:جهنگلي ٻلو) were also found in Sindh, likely related to the Eurasian species of lynx. Temminck noted that this species hunts in packs, similar to wild dogs, chasing down their prey. Lynxes are often domesticated and trained to hunt peacocks, cranes, and smaller quadrupeds. Though there haven't been any encounters in recent times.

== Cheetah ==
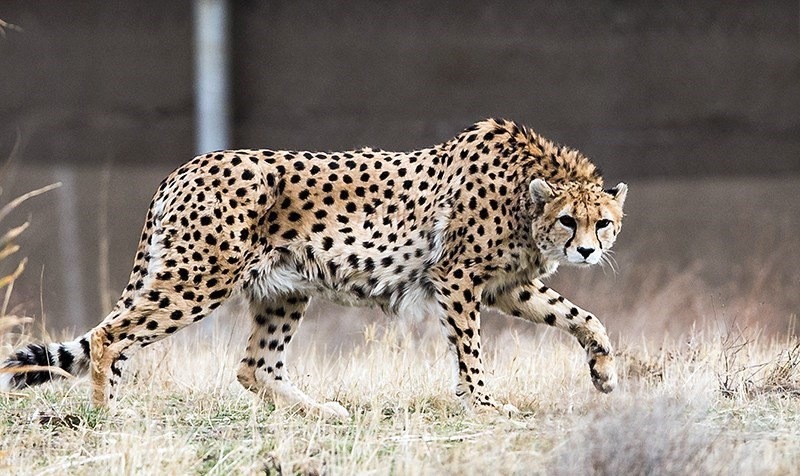
An Asiatic Cheetah

Cheetahs are also known as Hunting Leopards. The Sindhi word for cheetah (Sindhi: چِيتو) is a cognate to the word chitre (Sindhi:چٽ ), meaning spots. This in turn comes from chitra-ya (Sanskrit: चित्रय) meaning 'variegated', 'adorned' or 'painted'. The species is uncommon in Sindh, but is encountered along the Indus' banks drinking water and in the highlands, where it shares an environment with the leopard.
