= 1819 Rann of Kutch earthquake =

Earthquake and tsunami in Gujarat, India

- Location within India
- Local date: 16 June 1819
- Local time: 18:45 to 18:50
- Magnitude: 7.7–8.2 M_{w}
- Epicenter: 23.0°N 71.0°E
- Areas affected: India, Gujarat
- Max. intensity: MMI XI (Extreme)
- Tsunami: local
- Casualties: >1,543

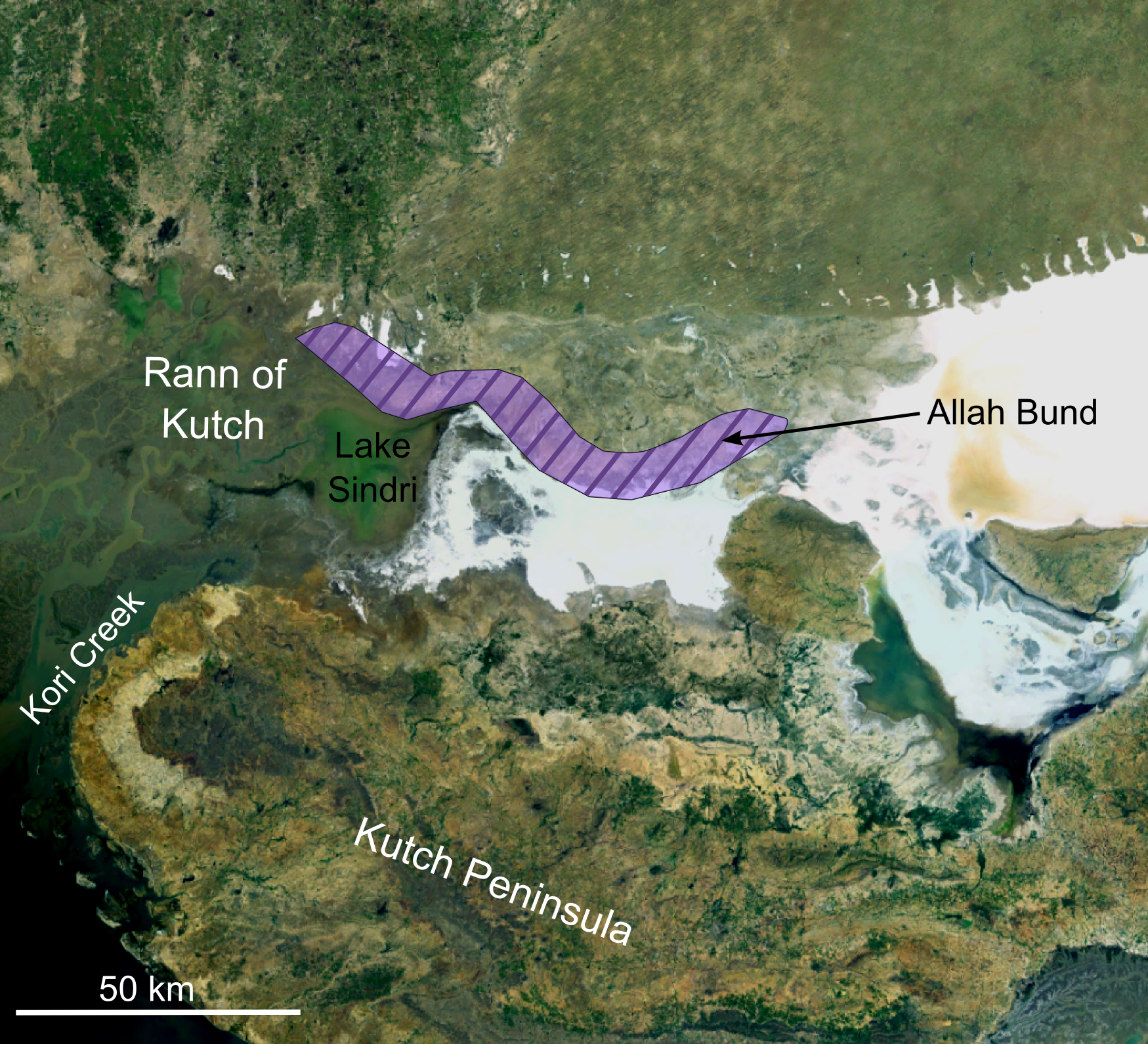
Satellite photo showing location of the "Allah Bund" (which runs from south of "Goth Bahaduur Khan Lund" in Pakistan to "Khavda" in India), "Lake Sindri" in India (south of Allah Bund), "Shakoor Lake" in Pakistan (north of Allah Bund).

The 1819 Rann of Kutch earthquake occurred at about 18:45 to 18:50 local time on 16 June 1819. It had an estimated magnitude ranging from 7.7 to 8.2 on the moment magnitude scale and a maximum perceived intensity of XI (Extreme) on the Mercalli intensity scale. It triggered a tsunami and caused at least 1,543 deaths. The earthquake caused an area of subsidence that formed the Sindri Lake and a local zone of uplift to the north about 80 km (50 mi) long, 6 km (3.7 mi) wide and 6 m (20 ft) high that dammed the Nara/Puran river/Koree/Kori River. This natural dam is known as the Allah Bund ("Dam of God").

== Geology: tectonic setting ==
The Kutch District of modern-day Gujarat lies on the Indian plate, 300–400 km (190–250 mi) southeast of the plate boundary between the Indian plate and the Eurasian plate, but the current tectonics is still governed by the effects of the continuing continental collision along this boundary. During the break-up of Gondwana in the Jurassic period, this area was affected by rifting with a roughly west–east trend. During the collision with Eurasia the area has undergone shortening, involving both reactivation of the original rift faults and the development of new low-angle thrust faults. The related folding has formed a series of ranges, particularly in central Kutch. The focal mechanism of most earthquakes is consistent with reverse faulting on reactivated rift faults. The 2001 Gujarat earthquake was caused by movement on a previously unknown south-dipping fault, trending parallel to the inferred rift structures.

== 1819 earthquake ==
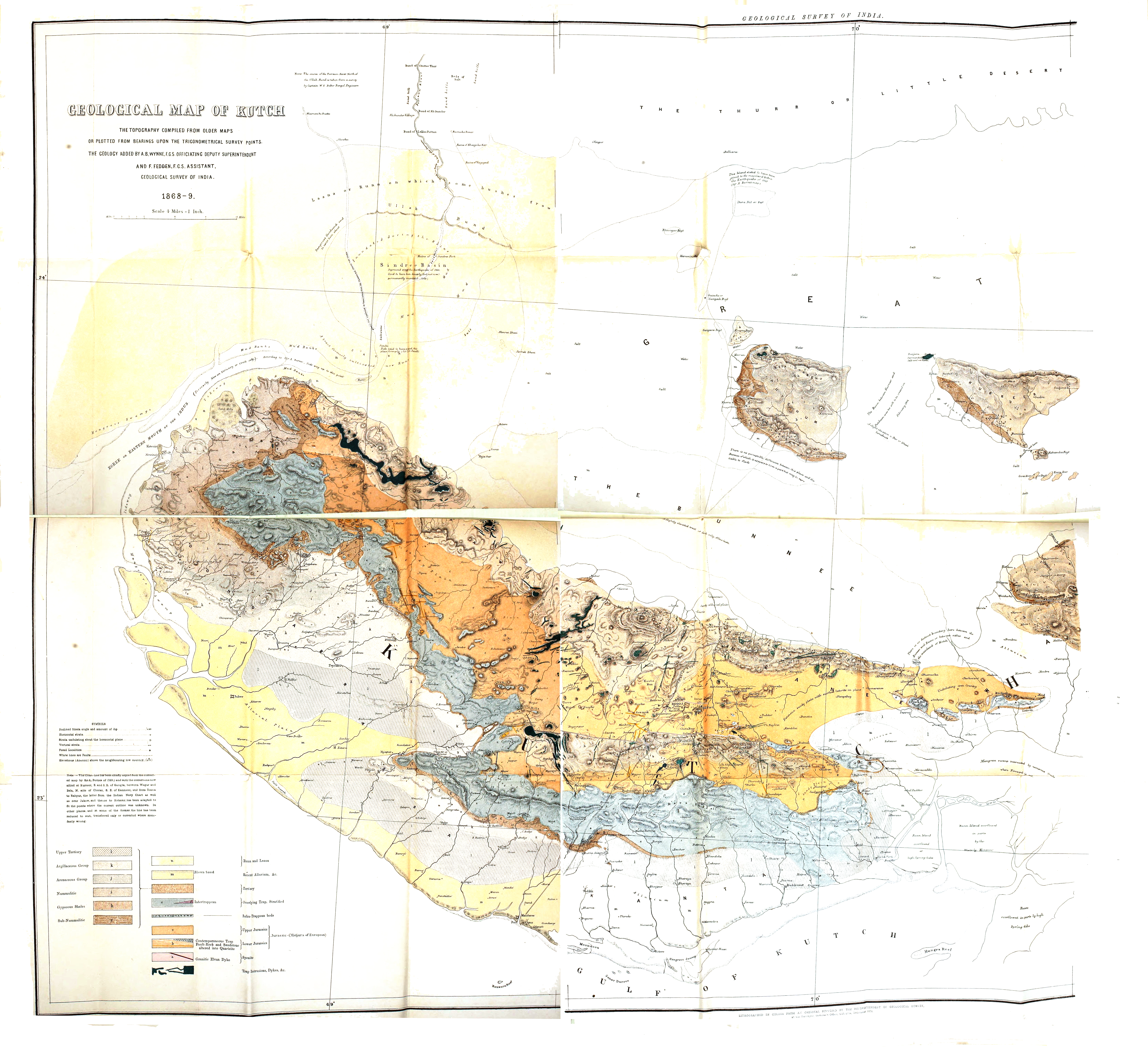
Geology of Kutch map in the Arthur Beavor Wynne's 1872 "Memoir on the Geology of Kutch".

=== Details ===
The earthquake lasted for two to three minutes. It was felt over an enormous area, from Chennai to Kolkata in the east, as far north as Kathmandu and as far west as Balochistan. The main shock was followed by prolonged aftershock activity, with major earthquakes continuing for at least 50 years, including one with estimated magnitude of more than 6.5 in 1846.

Maximum displacement during the earthquake is estimated at 12 m (39 ft), based on the height of the bund and the amount of subsidence to the south. Combined with a lateral extent of at least 80 km (50 mi), this gives an estimated moment magnitude of 7.7±0.2. This matches well with magnitudes estimated using both the total felt area and the area of VIII intensity. Other estimates based on intensity measurements give magnitudes as high as 8.2.

Modelling of the surface deformation indicates that the fault that slipped during the earthquake dipped to the north at between about 50°–67°. As faults that dip in excess of 50° are normally unfavourable for slip, it has been suggested that there was relatively high pore-fluid pressure developed at depth to allow this displacement to occur. There is evidence that the Indus river shifted westwards after this earthquake.

=== 1819 damage ===
The towns of Kothara, Mothala, Naliya and Vinzan suffered particularly heavy damage. Anjar, Bhuj, Lakhpat, Mandvi and Tera were also severely affected. At least 1,543 people were killed in the larger towns; the number of casualties in smaller towns and villages is unknown. There was some degree of damage to buildings over most of Gujarat, including the destruction of the "shaking minarets" of the Jama Masjid in Ahmedabad. At Jaisalmer in Rajasthan, "at least 500 guests were smothered at a wedding feast".

== Aftermath of 1819 earthquake ==
=== Damming of Nara river with formation of Allah Bund and Kori Creek ===
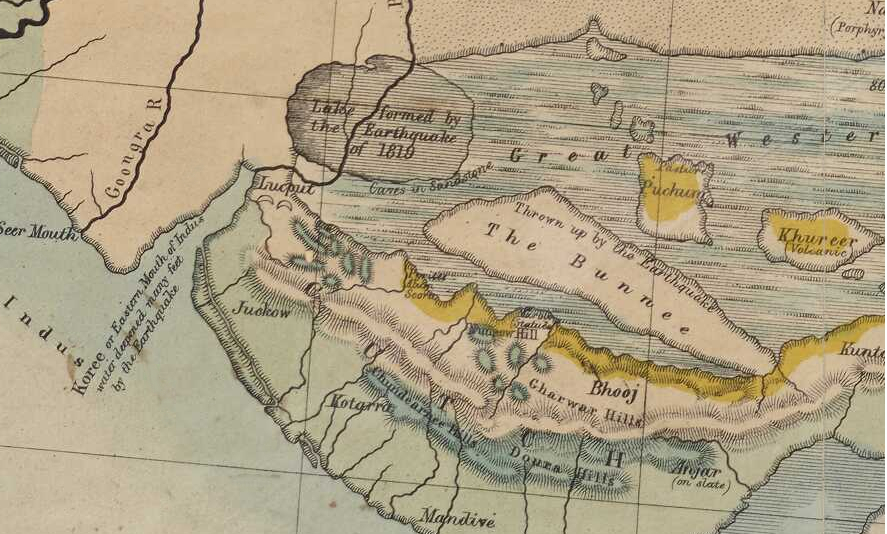
1854 map of the region by George Bellas Greenough. In this map, "Shakoor Lake" is marked by the words "Lake formed by the earthquake of 1819", "Canes in sandstone" refer to the Carnian pluvial-era fossilised reed in sandstone often referred to as "Schilfsandstein" in geological literature, "Allah Bund" is marked by "The Bunee", south of which is Bhuj Formation (containing "Gharwar Hills", "Doura Hills", "Chundearnee Hills", etc.).

Before 1819, the Nara was a massive, active freshwater branch of the Indus. It was the "main road" for trade. It flowed directly south, past Sindri Fort, and emptied into the sea through the Kori Mouth. It was deep enough for large ships and supported lush rice agriculture. The 1819 earthquake transformed a complex, organized river delta into the chaotic, marshy "wasteland" of creeks and salt lakes we see today. The Sir Creek, Vianwari Creek and the channels that became Harami Nala existed as secondary tidal spillways or smaller distributaries to the west of the Nara. They were part of the "western" delta drainage. While they might have interconnected with the Nara during heavy floods, they were distinct maritime inlets.

The most obvious topographic effect of this earthquake was the formation of a ridge about 6 m (20 ft) high, extending for 80 km (possibly as much as 150 km (93 mi)) that formed a natural dam across the Puram or Kori River. To distinguish it from the man-made dams that were common in the region, the uplifted area became known as the Allah Bund, or Dam of God. The mound produced had a markedly asymmetric geometry, with a shorter and steeper south-dipping margin, about 600 m wide and a dip of 0.65°, and a broader north-dipping margin over 5 km wide with a dip of only about 0.05°.

Present-day Allah Bund, just east of disputed Sir Creek in Great Rann of Kutch, has numerous mega solar projects near India–Pakistan border.

=== Formation of upstream Shakoor Lake ===
Shakoor Lake was formed north of Allah Bund with the emergence of Allah Bund and damming of Nara/Kori River system.

=== Formation of downstream Sindri Lake ===
Sindri Lake, south of the Allah Bund, with a surface area of more than 1,000 km^{2} (390 sq mi), was formed due to subsidence of up to 3 m (9.8 ft). Initially, the lake was cut off from the river (damming further upstream had stopped the flow) and was filled with seawater. On the western margin of the Sindri Lake, a small delta (Shakoor Lake) formed from the eastern part of the larger Indus Delta. After 1826 the Nara River broke through the artificial dam and eventually broke through the Allah Bund itself, causing the Sindri Lake to become freshwater again with the waters from Shakoor Lake.

=== Sindhri Fort submerged in Sindri Lake ===
There was a local tsunami that flooded the area known as the Great Rann of Kutch immediately after the earthquake. The fort at Sindri was destroyed by the earthquake and then partly submerged by the tsunami, "forcing survivors to climb to the top of the ruins."

== Later earthquakes ==
The 1956 Anjar earthquake was due to reverse faulting, similar in type to that which is thought to have caused the 1819 Rann of Kutch earthquake.

Changes in stress caused by coulomb stress transfer due to the 1819 earthquake may have been sufficient to trigger the 2001 Bhuj earthquake and other historic earthquakes that occurred in the region during the intervening period.

== See also ==
- List of earthquakes in India
- List of historical earthquakes
- List of tsunamis
