= Left Bank Outfall Drain =

Drainage canal in Pakistan

Coordinates: 24°41′N 69°12′E

Left Bank Outfall Drain is a drainage canal in Pakistan. Built between 1987 and 1997 using funding from the World Bank, the canal collects saline water, industrial effluents and Indus river basin floodwater from more than two million hectares of land of Shaheed Benazirabad, Sanghar, Mirpurkhas and Badin districts located in Nara River basin into the Arabian Sea.

LBOD is an extensive network of man-made drainage canals in Sindh, designed to mitigate waterlogging and salinity caused by intensive irrigation from the Sukkur Barrage systems. The network begins in central Sindh, north of Nawabshah, and its primary arterial channel, known as the Spinal Drain, runs southwards roughly parallel to the major irrigation canals on the left bank of the Indus River. Rather than supplying water, the LBOD acts as a "sink" to collect saline effluent, agricultural runoff, and industrial waste from the command areas of the Ghotki, Rohri, and Nara canals. The system culminates in a strategic bifurcation in the Badin District, where the Spinal Drain splits into two primary branches: the Kadhan Pateji Outfall Drain (KPOD) and the Dhoro Puran Outfall Drain (DPOD). The DPOD was engineered to divert excess storm runoff and drainage into Shakoor Lake and the Rann of Kutch, while the KPOD serves as the primary conduit for high-salinity water. The KPOD discharges into the 42-kilometre (26 mi) long Tidal Link Canal, which acts as the final segment of the network, conveying effluent directly into the Arabian Sea via the Shah Samando Creek.

The engineering of the Tidal Link Canal remains a subject of environmental debate due to its vulnerability to seawater backflow and tidal surges during monsoon seasons. The canal overflowed in 2003 and 2011, causing widespread flooding it was meant to prevent. Although the Nara breached this barrier in 1826, restoring some freshwater flow, the modern Left Bank Outfall Drain (LBOD) was engineered to bypass these natural obstructions and discharge saline effluent directly into the Arabian Sea via the Sir Creek or Shah Samando Creek systems. The 1819 Rann of Kutch earthquake radically altered the regional hydrology by creating the Allah Bund, a 6-metre high natural dam that obstructed the historic flow of the Nara River and led to the formation of the upstream Shakoor Lake and the downstream Sindri Lake.

== Project details ==
=== Location ===
It starts from Ghotki district, which is located on the Sindh-Punjab border, and flows through the districts on the left bank of River Indus before ending in the Sir Creek of Arabian Sea on Badin's coast.

=== Capacity ===
Its designed capacity is 4,500 cusecs The canal's effluent disseminates into Dhoro Puran Outfall Drain (DPOD) with capacity of 2000 cusec and Kadhan Pateji Outfall Drain (KPOD) having capacity of 2500 cusec. The DPOD empties into Shakoor Lake located both in Pakistan and India whereas effluent of KPDO is directly discharged into sea through 41 km long Tidal Link Canal. Drainage capacity of canal has been increased to 9000 cusecs after 2011 floods by de-silting of bed of drain, raising banks up to two feet, repairing damaged hydraulic structures and by clearing vegetative growth.

=== Purpose ===
LBOD is located in the catchment area of the Old Nara River which is a left bank delta channel of Indus River. Old Nara River streams are used to collect the saline water generated from irrigated lands and the industrial effluents. In the middle reach (i.e. Nara canal) of this river, saline and polluted water flowing into the river are diluted by feeding main Indus River water from Sukkur barrage and supplied by gravity canals for irrigation and industrial needs. The saline water generated from the irrigated lands and the industrial effluents are collected by the LBOD canal network from the lower reaches of the Old Nara River or Puran River to discharge by gravity flow to the sea. Also bore wells are used to pump saline water into the LBOD or the Old Nara River streams to depress the saline ground water level at safe depth or prevent waterlogging. As most of the cultivated lands are located on the left side of the Indus River, LBOD would be the predominant means of discharging the river salt load to the sea once the Indus River waters are fully put to use without letting the Indus River water overflow to the sea from the Kotri barrage which is the last barrage across the river. Effective usage of LBOD is crucial to preserve/enhance the soil fertility in lower reaches of Indus basin area or Sind province or Indus River Delta for discharging adequate salt load to the sea.

== Issues ==
=== Doubtful efficacy of the LBOD system ===
However, the efficacy of the LBOD remains a point of contention. During extreme weather events, such as the floods of 1999, 2011, and 2024, the system suffered catastrophic failures. Rather than reaching its maritime outfall, high-intensity tidal surges and backwater effects caused toxic saline water to overflow into the surrounding drainage basins and Shakoor Lake. This recurring failure has significantly increased the salinity levels of the remnant Nara River system, degrading the local freshwater ecosystem and the livelihoods of communities dependent on these wetlands for agriculture and fishing.

=== Collapse of Cholri Weir ===
The Cholri Weir of LBOD system, constructed at the "Cholri dhand" (Cholri wetland/lagoon), was a critical hydraulic regulator designed to control the backflow of seawater and protect the freshwater dhands (lagoons) of the Ramsar wetlands from the saline effluents of the Left Bank Outfall Drain (LBOD). However, almost immediately after its completion, the structure suffered a catastrophic failure when a 250-foot section collapsed due to design faults and tidal pressure. This degradation culminated in May 1999, when a severe tropical cyclone almost completely destroyed the weir and breached the Tidal Link embankments in dozens of places. The collapse effectively turned the drainage system into a conduit for sea intrusion, allowing seawater to flow inland and devastating the local ecosystem, including the contamination of groundwater and the destruction of indigenous flora and fauna. Despite various repair attempts, the failure of the Cholri Weir remains a central point of environmental and technical criticism regarding the LBOD's impact on southern Sindh.

=== Environmental impact ===
The creation of the canal has been said to have a negative impact on wetlands in the area, especially in India's Great Rann of Kutch area, and by releasing LBOD's salt water into the purposefully built Chotiari Reservoir in Sindh in Pakistan.

== See also ==
- 1819 Rann of Kutch earthquake, which changed the geography and river channels of the area
- Chotiari Dam, stores water from LOBD
- Nara Canal, older canal system
- Sir Creek dispute
