= Nara Canal =

Canal in Pakistan

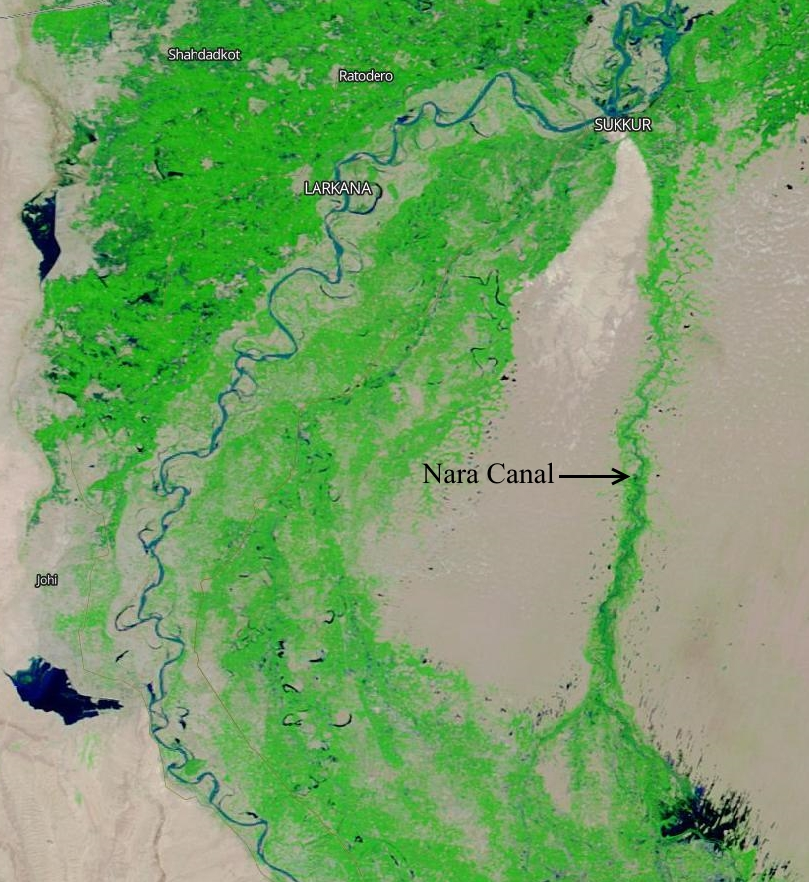
Nara Canal originates from Sukkur Barrage, Eastern bank of Indus River and runs through the Thar Desert. See also this satellite image.

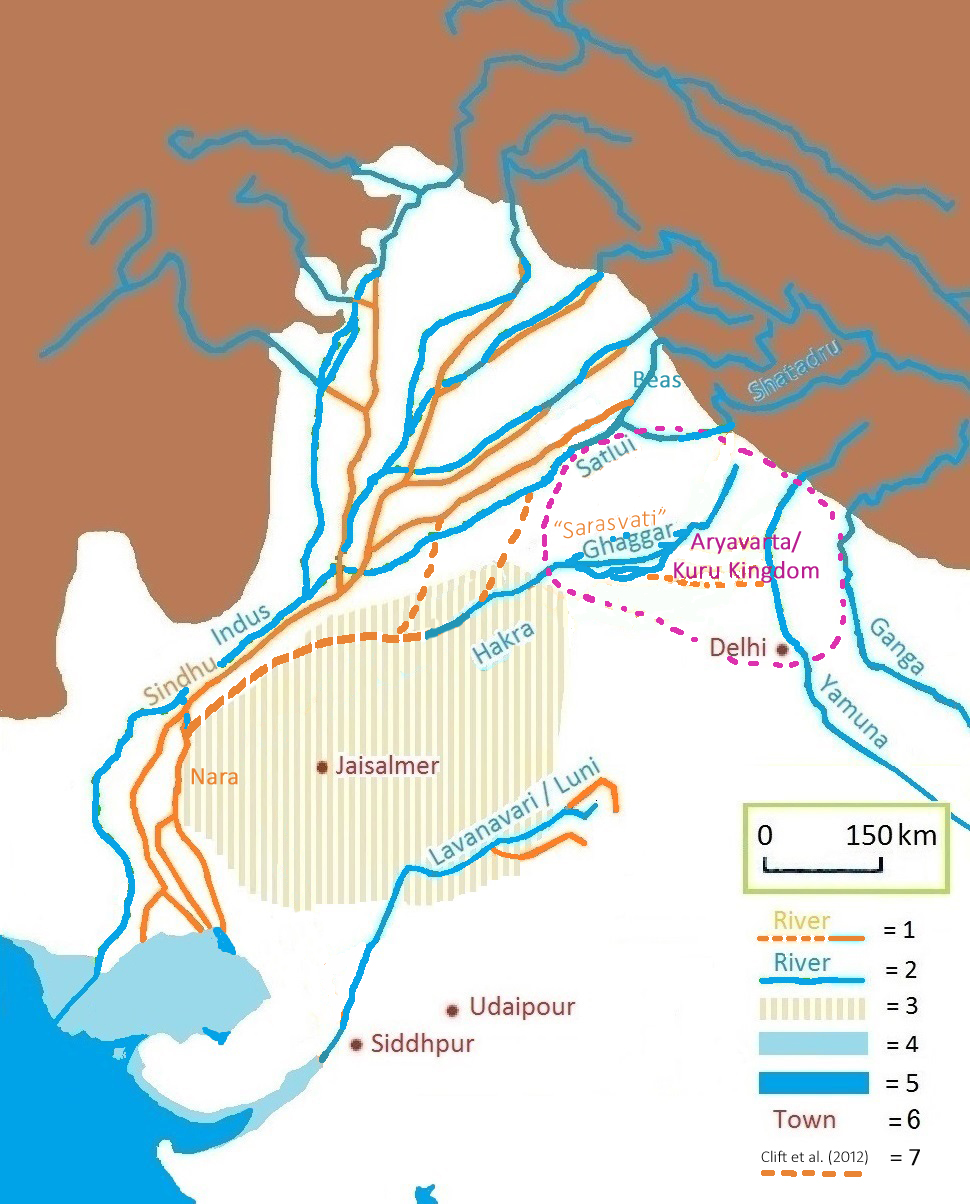
Vedic and present-day Gagghar-Hakra river-course, with Aryavarta/Kuru kingdom, dried-up Harappan Hakkra course, and pre-Harappan paleochannel as proposed by Clift et al. (2012). (Note: See map) 1 = ancient river 2 = today's river 3 = today's Thar desert 4 = ancient shore 5 = today's shore 6 = today's town 7 = dried-up Harappan Hakkra course, and pre-Harappan Sutlej paleochannels Clift et al. (2012).

The Nara Canal, which takes off from the Sukkur Barrage and The Nara Canal drains in to Shakoor Lake before overflowing into Kori Creek (also called Koree Creek and Puran River) of the Great Rann of Kutch, is a delta channel of the Indus River in Sindh province, Pakistan that was built as an excavated channel stemming off the left bank of the Indus River to join the course of the old Nara River, a tributary c.q. paleochannel of the Indus which received water from the Ghaggar-Hakra until the Hakra dried-up, early 2nd millennium BCE. This is one of the largest and oldest canals in Pakistan. It takes off from the Sukkur Barrage on the Indus River and follows the ancient bed of the Hakra/Nara River. It provides freshwater to millions of acres of farmland in Khairpur, Sanghar, Mirpurkhas, and Umerkot.

After the 1819 Rann of Kutch earthquake created Allah Bund which caused the formation of upstream Shakoor Lake and downstream Sindri Lake, the Left Bank Outfall Drain (LBOD) was constructed to bypass the Allah Bund and discharge directly into the Kori Creek. However, during the massive floods of 1999, 2011, and 2024, the LBOD failed. Instead of reaching the sea, the toxic saline water backed up and spilled into Shakoor Lake and the Nara drainage basins, flooding the very lands it was supposed to protect. Because the LBOD often fails to reach the Kori Creek efficiently, it dumps saline water into the remnant Nara River system. This has increased the salinity of Shakoor Lake, destroying the local freshwater ecosystem that was briefly restored in 1826 when the Nara breached the Allah Bund.

== Geography ==
The canal runs from above the Sukkur Barrage through the districts of Khairpur, Sanghar, Mirpurkhas and Tharparkar to the Jamrao Canal. The Nara is the longest canal in Pakistan, running for about 226 mi (364 km). It has a designed capacity of 13,602 cu ft/s (385.2 m^{3}/s), but actually discharges 14,145 cu ft/s (400.5 m^{3}/s). About 2,000,000 acres (8,100 km^{2}) of land are irrigated by this canal. Within the Khairpur District, the canal and its associated wetlands were made into the Nara Game Reserve in 1972.

== History: historic Nara River ==
The historic Nara River (not to be confused with the present-day smaller local Nara River in Kutch district of India) was a tributary, c.q. paleochannel, of the Indus, and a paleochannel of Ghaggar-Hakra river system. After traversing Bahawalpur, the Hakra used to enter into the present Nara Canal a few miles downstream of its present head. The Ghaggar-Hakra is identified with the Vedic Sarasvati river, although the Hakra had already dried-up by Vedic times.

The historic Nara River's, a south-flowing distributary of the Indus River in Sindh, today what was its upper and middle section is now the Nara Canal in Sindh in Pakistan, its lower estuarian section where it entered the Great Rann of Kutch was called the Puran River or the Koree River, after the 1819 Rann of Kutch earthquake, which created the Allah Bund and cut off the freshwater flow from the Indus, the lower mouth of this river became a tidal inlet known as Kori Creek.

== Nara Canal System ==
=== 1858–59 onwards: construction of the Nara Canal ===
Before the construction of the Nara canal, the Indus River used to overflow in Bahawalpur and Sind Province above Rohri and the spillovers used to enter the Nara River. Bunds were constructed by the Bahawalpur state authorities to protect their lands against floods and spillovers, which reduced the flood intensities into the Nara River. Similarly, due to low flows in the Indus River in certain years, the Nara River did not get much water. Therefore, the Nara supply channel was excavated in 1858–59 to directly supply water from the Indus river. The supply channel was excavated by 2.5 feet in 1884-85 and by a further 3.5 feet in 1893. (Note: Imperial Gazetteer of India (1908))

=== 1899: construction of Jamrao Regulator Head to divide Nara Canal ===
Jamrao Regulator Head Complex divides Nara Canal (which originates from the Sukkur Barrage) into two sections, Upper Nara Canal which extends approx. 115 miles from the Sukkur Barrage to the Jamrao Regulator Head Complex, and Lower Nara Canal (also called Jamrao Canal which continues downstream from the Jamrao regulator and flows approx. 105 miles to Shakoor Lake. Commissioned in 1899, the Jamrao Regulator and Jamrao Canal was the first weir-controlled perennial canal in Sindh. It was envisioned by Lieutenant J.G. Fife to transform the Thar Desert wasteland into fertile farmland.

=== 1960s onwards: construction of the LOBD to protect Nara Canal ecosystem ===
Left Bank Outfall Drain to the west of Nara Canal, built much later (starting in the 1960s and 80s) than Nara Canal, the LBOD was designed to solve the waterlogging and salinity problems caused by intensive irrigation from canals like the Nara. It collects salty groundwater and industrial/agricultural waste from the left bank of the Indus and carries it south to be dumped into the sea. The "Spinal Drain" of the LBOD runs parallel to the Nara Canal system for much of its journey through southern Sindh collecting drainage and waste water from the command areas of the Nara, Ghotki, and Rohri canals. Both systems eventually head toward the Shakoor Lake and the Rann of Kutch. Historically, the Nara River carved the path; the LBOD now utilizes parts of that same low-lying topography to move waste water.

Chotiari Dam, a major off-canal storage facility developed under the LBOD project to enhance water storage for the Jamrao system, receives water from the Ranto Canal (an off-take of the Jamrao Regulator Head) and strategically releases it to benefit the Lower Nara command area when needed.

== See also ==
- 1819 Rann of Kutch earthquake
- Allah Bund
- Sir Creek

== Sources ==
Printed sources

- Bradnock, Robert W. (1992). South Asian handbook. Travelers world guides. Vol. 1992. Trade & Travel Publications. p. 1071. ISBN 0-900751-40-1.
- Clift, Peter D.; Carter, Andrew; Giosan, Liviu; Durcan, Julie; et al. (2012), "U-Pb zircon dating evidence for a Pleistocene Sarasvati River and capture of the Yamuna River", Geology, 40 (3): 211–214, Bibcode:2012Geo....40..211C, doi:10.1130/g32840.1, S2CID 130765891
- Khanzada, Mohammed N. (1997). Preliminary Business Plan for Bareji Distributary. Lahore: Pakistan National Program, International Irrigation Management Institute. p. 2.
- McIntosh, Jane (2008), The Ancient Indus Valley: New Perspectives, ABC-CLIO
- Rehman, S.; et al. (2001). Proposed business plan for pilot farmer organizations: extended project on farmer managed irrigated agriculture in LBOD project area of Sindh Province. IWMI. p. 2. ISBN 92-9090-464-X.
- Schuldenrein (2004), "Landscapes, soils, and mound histories of the Upper Indus Valley, Pakistan: New insights on the Holocene environments near ancient Harappa", Journal of Archaeological Science, 31 (6): 777–797, Bibcode:2004JArSc..31..777S, doi:10.1016/j.jas.2003.10.015

Web-sources
