= India–Pakistan water dispute of 1948 =

Dispute over the sharing of river waters between India and Pakistan

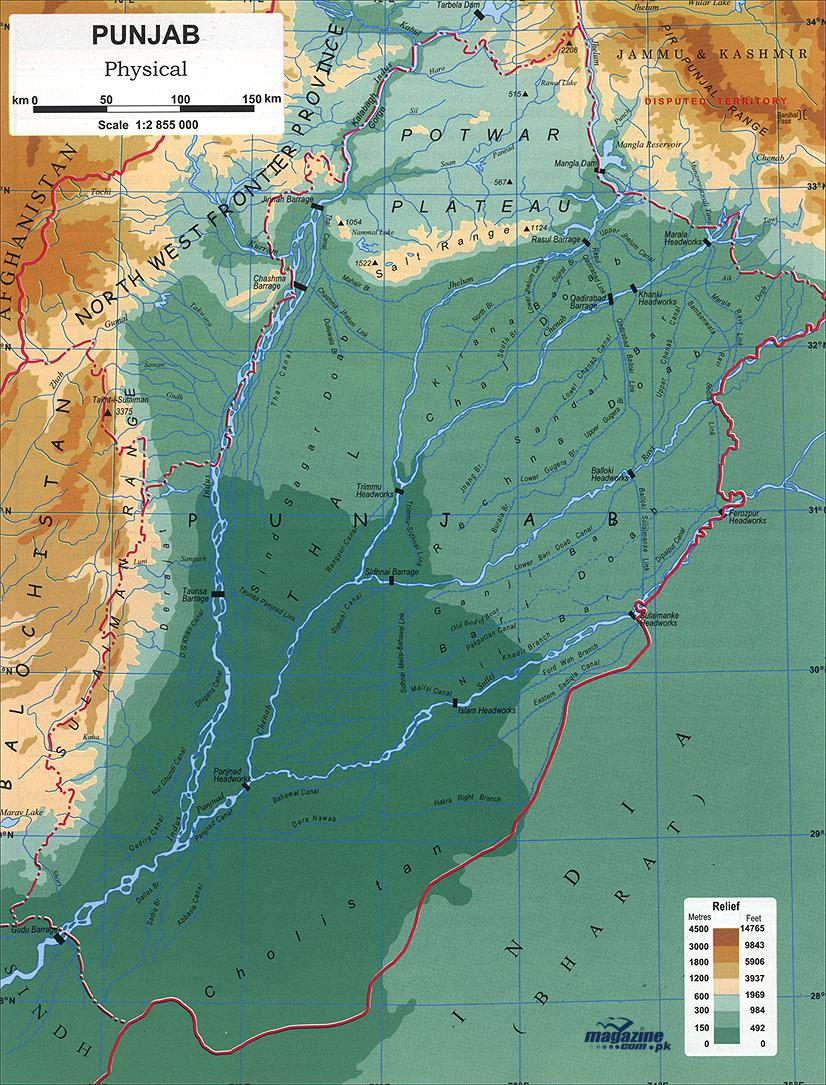
The Indus river system in West Punjab

India and Pakistan had a dispute over the sharing of Indus waters in April 1948, about eight months after their independence. The East Punjab province of India shut off water running to the West Punjab province of Pakistan via the main branches of the Upper Bari Doab Canal as well as the Dipalpur Canal from the Ferozepur Headworks. It was resumed after five weeks when Pakistan agreed to attend an Inter-Dominion conference to negotiate an agreement. The critical nature of the Indian action caused deep apprehensions in Pakistan, which were eventually resolved only with the signing of the Indus Waters Treaty in 1960.

== Partition and Indus waters ==
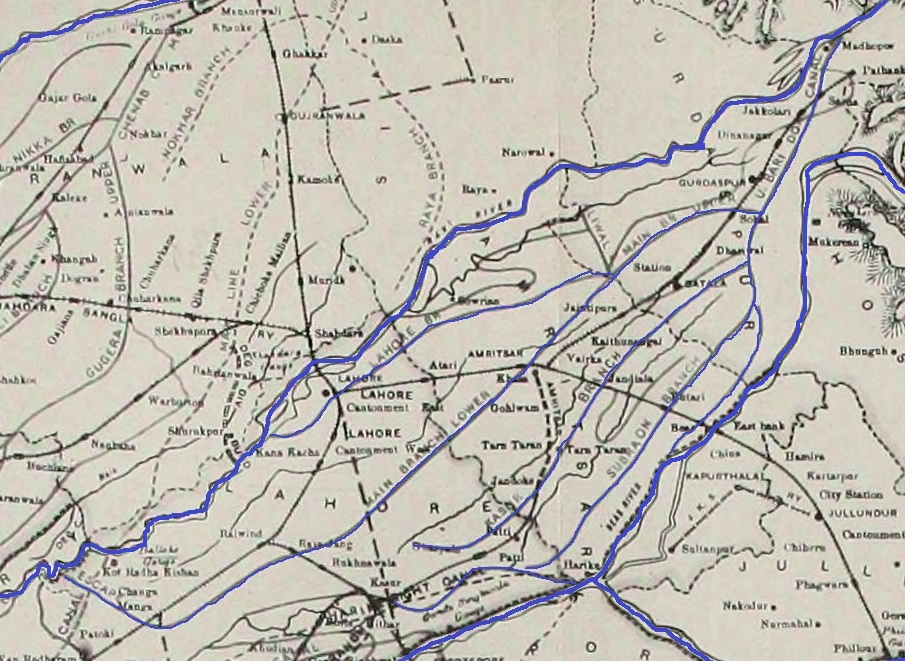
Branches of the Upper Bari Doab Canal

The Indus river system, consisting of the Indus River and its five tributaries, was divided across India and Pakistan as a result of the partition of India. During the boundary negotiations for partitioning Punjab, Sir Cyril Radcliffe asked whether the river waters could be put under a joint management, but neither Pakistani nor Indian representatives on the boundary commission agreed to the proposal. The Radcliffe line cut Punjab into two, with West Punjab going to Pakistan and East Pubjab to India.

The Ravi River and the Sutlej River flow from the East Punjab to West Punjab. At the time of partition, the Ravi River had a barrage at the Madhopur Headworks and water was channelled along the Upper Bari Doab Canal, which supplied water to the cities of Amritsar (in East Punjab) and Lahore (in West Punjab), as well as irrigating large areas in both sections of Punjab. The Sutlej was dammed at Ferozepur (in East Punjab), with Dipalpur Canal carrying water to West Punjab and Bahawalpur (then a princely state in Pakistan), and the Ganga Canal carrying it to Bikaner (a princely state in India). East Punjab had the ability to control the flows along these canals.

The three western rivers, Indus and its tributaries Jhelum and Chenab, flow through the Kashmir region into Pakistan. The rest of India has no access to their waters due to the intervening mountain ranges.

== Water shut-off ==
The chief engineers of East Punjab and West Punjab signed a Standstill Agreement on 20 December 1947 to the effect that the status quo on water distribution would be maintained until 31 March 1948 in order to cover the period of the Rabi crop. West Punjab government neglected to negotiate a further agreement before its expiry. It was also reported that the people in the canal colonies that received the water did not pay the water dues, and shutting off water was the standard tactic that provinces applied to each other in such a situation.

On 1 April 1948, the East Punjab government shut off water flowing to West Pakistan along the main branches of the Upper Bari Doab Canal and the Dipalpur Canal. Scholars state that it was a provincial action rather than a "national" action. However, once initiated, it also took on the significance of the Indian government's assertion of national control over water resources.

Pakistan was aghast at the sudden shut-off of water. The effect was immediately felt in Lahore, which depended on canal water for the water needs of the entire city. Pakistan also faced a coming Kharif season without water for 5.5% of its cropland. It called India's action "Machiavellian duplicity", and claimed "historical usage rights". India was firm and wanted recognition of its rights to all waters in the eastern rivers. Many in Pakistan advocated going to war with India, but eventually Pakistan agreed to negotiate.

In May 1948, an Inter-Dominion conference was held in Delhi to negotiate terms. In the resulting 'Delhi Agreement', Pakistan agreed to deposit a sum of money with India as "seignorage". It accepted a framework in which East Punjab would progressively diminish the supply of canal water in order to allow West Punjab to "tap alternative sources". Pakistan's delegation also recognised the "natural anxiety" of East Punjab to use water to develop its own areas which were "underdeveloped in relation to ... West Punjab". But the negotiators later claimed that they were forced to agree to terms under duress and that Pakistan had rights to existing usages in accordance with "international law and equity". India gave such rights no formal recognition. Pakistan broke the agreement reached in Delhi and refused to pay dues to India. It tried to create anti-India hysteria over water and tried to use it as a political ploy over Kashmir.

Lahore received water again after five weeks. As Pakistan Times reported, it generated "great excitement among Lahore people", who flocked to the canal bank. Estimates of losses from what the Pakistanis called a "water blockade" were put at Rs. 2 crore.

== Aftermath ==
Pakistan faced an urgent sense of the need to develop new waterworks. Engineers were summoned to address the situation of "national emergency". A "Sutlej link-channel" to Dipalpur canal was constructed circumventing Ferozepur, lest India might block the water to Dipalpur canal again. (Note: Before reaching Ferozepur, Sutlej has a small stretch in West Punjab territory from which the channel was taken. It eventually fell into disuse after the Indus Waters Treaty.) A "Ravi-Bari Doab connecting channel" (which eventually became the BRB Canal) was conceptualised to carry water from Jhelum and Chenab to the Bari Doab and free Pakistan from dependence on Indian-controlled water supply. These canals were conceptualised as "national mobilisation" projects that involved volunteers from Lahore and villagers along the canal route, evoking a language of selfless individual sacrifice in the name of the nation.

Pakistan's diplomatic response to India's water policies in these years involved strong assertions of morality in claiming water rights based international legal doctrines of prior use. It continued to imagine the natural unity of a river basin that is shared with India despite the partition. By 1951, the situation had become intractable and Pakistani press was calling for more drastic action. The two countries were said to be at the brink of war. At this stage, David E. Lilienthal, former chairman of the Tennessee Valley Authority, visited India and Pakistan, and proposed that the World Bank could help the two countries develop the Indus river system and provide food security to millions of people. Through the World Bank-brokered negotiations, eventually the Indus Waters Treaty was agreed in 1960, and signed by the two countries. Under the treaty, Pakistan has rights to unrestricted use of the three western rivers of the Indus system, which India has an obligation to "let flow", and India has rights to unrestricted use of the three eastern rivers.

== See also ==
- Water conflict
- Water resources law
- Indus Water Treaty
- India–Pakistan relations
- Irrigation in India
- Rivers of Jammu and Kashmir
- Water politics
- 2025 India–Pakistan diplomatic crisis

== Bibliography ==
- Cheema, Muhammad Jehanzeb Masud; Pawar, Prakashkiran (2015), Bridging the Divide (PDF), Stimson Centre
- Gilmartin, David (2020), Blood and Water: The Indus River Basin in Modern History, Univ of California Press, ISBN 978-0-520-35553-8
- Rai, Sheila; Patnaik, Sanghamitra (2012), "Water Disputes in South Asia", in Dhirendra K. Vajpeyi (ed.), Water Resource Conflicts and International Security: A Global Perspective, Lexington Books, pp. 103–, ISBN 978-0-7391-6817-2
- Salman, Salman M. A.; Uprety, Kishor (2002), Conflict and Cooperation on South Asia's International Rivers: A Legal Perspective, World Bank Publications, ISBN 978-0-8213-5352-3
