= Vinjhan =

Vinzan Vinjhan
- Village
- Location in Gujarat, India Vinzan (India)
- Coordinates: 23.103°N 69.025°E
- Country: India
- State: Gujarat
- District: Kutch
- Taluka: Abdasa
- Time zone: UTC+5:30 (IST)
- PIN: 370490
- Vehicle registration: GJ
- Lok Sabha constituency: Kachchh
- Vidhan Sabha constituency: Abdasa
- Website: gujaratindia.com

Vinzan or Vinjhan is a village in Abdasa Taluka in Kutch district of Gujarat, India.

== Etymology ==
The name Vinzan is said to come from the Vinjar who is the great thief son of King Karayal Sama from Sindh.

== History ==
In the time of Gadhesing, about two miles to the west of the present site, was the town Kanchiba Pattan. Its only traces are the ruins of a small shrine of Kalika Mata, a shallow pool and the remains of a fortress. About the time when Karai Samma came from Sindh, and built a palace in Poladiya, twelve miles east of Kanchiba, Vinzan passed from Gadhesing into the hands of Kanak Dev Chavda. The Halas, who afterwards took it, removed the town to its present site near the Vindhyavasini temple, and held it till they were driven out by Jasaji, the nephew of Rao Khengarji. Vindhyavasini's temple, lately re-built, is simple. Another temple of Rakheshvar Mahadev, built according to an inscription in 1631, is of hard yellow stone on a pedestal 5 1/2 feet high 45 long and 35 wide. There are three domed porches with small pyramidal spires ornamented with lions. The entrance porch has four cusped arches. The entrance hall, mandap, 18 feet by 16 1/2, has a central dome with courses of 8, 16 and 32 sides merging into circles, one projecting over the other, and ending in a central lotus. In the cloisters are two colossal statues of Hanuman and Kalika, the latter in the act of killing Mahishasur. The shrine, 6 feet long by 7 1/2 wide and 32 high, has a linga in the centre, and in niches in the opposite wall images of Ganpati and Parvati. The whole is well built, and has pretty good carving.
