= Chotiari Dam =

- Location within Sindh Location within Pakistan
- Official name: چوٹیاری بند
- Country: Pakistan
- Location: Achhro Thar (White Desert) Sanghar District, Sindh, Pakistan
- Coordinates: 26°8′15″N 69°3′48″E
- Purpose: Reservoir
- Status: Operational
- Construction began: 1994
- Opening date: December 2002
- Construction cost: 1.5 billion rupees (approx. US $ 26.3 million)
- Operators: Sindh Irrigation and Drainage Authority (SIDA)

Reservoir
- Creates: Chotiari Water Reservoir
- Total capacity: 0.75 million acre feet (MAF)
- Active capacity: 0.67 MAF
- Surface area: 18,000 hectares (44,000 acres); 160 square kilometres (62 sq mi)
- Maximum length: 16 kilometres (9.9 miles)
- Maximum width: 13 kilometres (8.1 miles)
- Maximum water depth: 45 feet (14 metres)

Chotiari Dam (Urdu: چوٹیاری بند) is an artificial water reservoir situated 35 km away from the Sanghar town in the Sanghar District of the Sindh province of Pakistan. Its construction was completed in December, 2002, at the total cost of Rs 6 billion. The main purpose of constructing this dam was to discharge saline water of the Left Bank Outfall Drain (LBOD). The dam is extended to 9,800 hectares (24,300 acres) with storage capacity of 300,000 hectares (750,000 acres). It has an active capacity of 0.67 MAF.

Before the construction of the reservoir, this site was home to a few natural lakes, fed by the tributaries of the Nara Canal. It is also a wetland and habitat for birds, reptiles and small mammals. Now, the environment and wildlife of this area is badly affected by the saline water discharge of Left Bank Outfall Drain (LBOD).

== See also ==
- 1819 Rann of Kutch earthquake
- Nara Canal system
