= Kori Creek =

River in Gujarat, India

Coordinates: 23°35′N 68°22′E

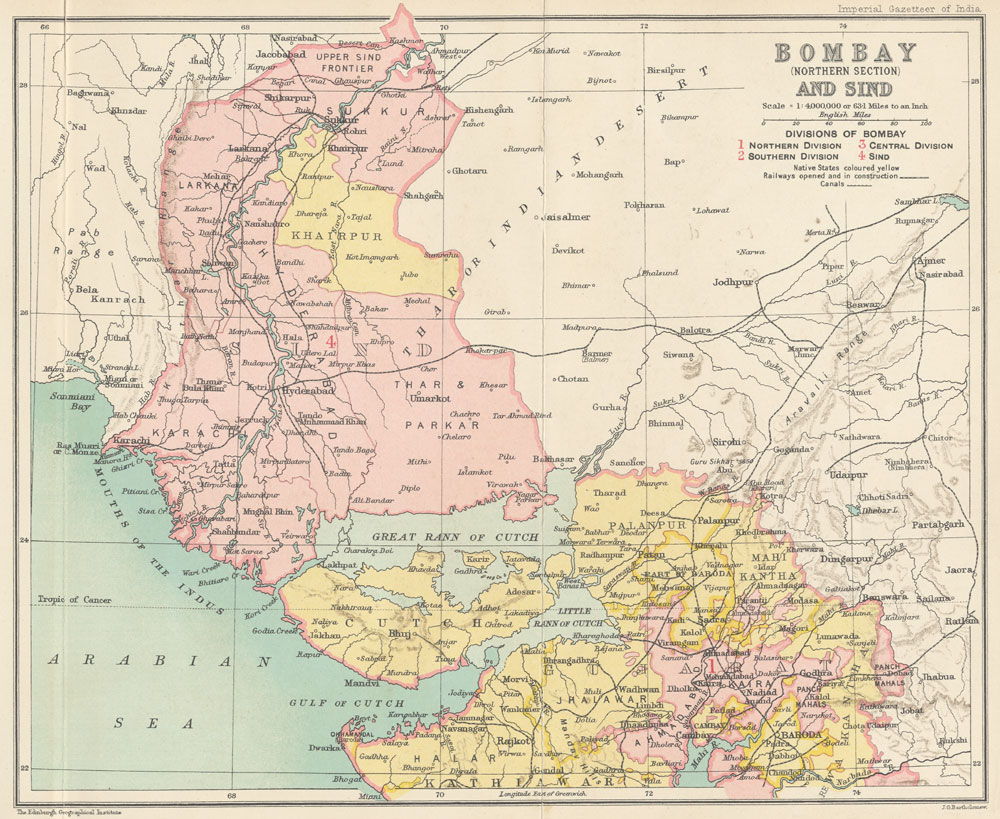
- Location of Kori Creek in British Colonial era map

Physical characteristics
- Mouth
  - location: Indian Ocean

Basin features
- River system: Indus River delta

Kori Creek

The Kori Creek is a tidal creek in the Kutch region of the Indian state of Gujarat. It lies just to the west of the Great Rann of Kutch area of India. This region belonging to India is a part of the Indus River Delta, which lies across Gujarat state in India and Sindh in Pakistan.

Kori Creek is a remnant of the historic Nara River (not to be confused with the present-day smaller local Nara River in Kutch district of India). The historic Nara River was a tributary, c.q. paleochannel, of the Indus River, and a paleochannel of Ghaggar-Hakra river system. After traversing Bahawalpur, the Hakra used to enter into the present Nara Canal a few miles downstream of its present head. The Ghaggar-Hakra is identified with the Vedic Sarasvati river, although the Hakra had already dried-up by Vedic times. The historic Nara River's, a south-flowing distributary of the Indus River in Sindh, previously what was its upper and middle section is now the Nara Canal in Sindh in Pakistan, its lower estuarian section where it entered the Great Rann of Kutch was called the Puran River or the Koree/Kori River. After the 1819 Rann of Kutch earthquake, which created the Allah Bund and cut off the freshwater flow from the Indus, the lower mouth of this river became a tidal inlet known as Kori Creek.

Koree river (Kori river), Indus river delta branch/channel, shifted its course after an 1819 Rann of Kutch earthquake isolating Rann of Kutch from its delta, which also turned the Kori river into the Kori creek.

The Sir Creek, laying around 33 km northwest of Kori Creek, is a disputed area between India and Pakistan.

== Geography ==
On the border of India and Pakistan in Gujarat at the mouth of the Indus River, the Kori Creek is one of the six main creeks on the Indian side. All other five are to the west of it, namely Sir Creek – the westernmost creek, Vian Wari Creek (Vianbari and Viyanbari), Pir Sanai, Pabevari, and Padala 16 km west. All of these creeks are within undisputed territory of India, except for the westernmost creek, namely the Sir Creek, which is claimed by both India and Pakistan. Ever shifting creeks exit Indian territory, enter Pakistan, reenter India and vice versa, thus creating a hard-to-patrol snake- and scorpion-infested marshy wetland border with no physical barrier or fencing. The Indian military's Border Security Force (BSF) patrols the Kori Creek and Sir Creek up to the midstream using floating border posts, amphibious vehicles, and foot travel by the Creek Crocodile Commandos. The coastal area of the Sir Creek is patrolled by the Indian Coast Guard, while the larger open sea beyond is patrolled by the Indian Navy.

== See also ==
- Rann of Kutch
- Borders of India
