= Nara River (India) =

Nara river
- Discharge at the Nara Dam reservoir

Location
- Country: India
- State: Gujarat

Physical characteristics
- Source
  - location: India
  - coordinates: 23.5967°N 68.9378°E
- Mouth
  - location: Great Rann of Kutch
  - coordinates: 23.6837°N 69.1130°E
- Length: 25 km (16 mi)
- Discharge
  - location: Nara Dam reservoir

The Nara River is a river located in Kutch in the Indian state of Gujarat. It flows northeast into the Great Rann of Kutch.

The Nara River originates near the Paneli village, in the southeastern parts of Lakhpat tehsil in the Kutch district, and empties into the Great Rann of Kutch. It has a length of 25 km, and a catchment area of 233 km^{2} (90 sq mi). Nara River, with a catchment area of 233 sq. km, flows northeast from Paneli to the Nara Dam, which was constructed between 1978-81 across the river near the Nara village and now collects the entire discharge of the river in its reservoir.

Mitti River in Kutch (not to be confused with Mithi River, which originates south of Paneli at Trambau and flows south to the Arabian Sea, has the Mitti Dam at Rampar Abda village.

== See also ==
- Sir Creek
