= Sir Creek =

Tidal estuary on the Indus River in India and Pakistan

- Sir Creek

Physical characteristics
- Mouth
  - location: Indian Ocean
  - coordinates: 23°58′N 68°48′E

Basin features
- River system: Indus River Delta

Sir Creek (/sər ˈkrik/ sər KREEK), originally Ban Ganga, is a 96 km (60 mi) tidal estuary in the uninhabited marshlands of the Indus River Delta on the border between India and Pakistan. The creek flows into the Arabian Sea and separates Gujarat state in India from Sindh province in Pakistan. The long-standing India-Pakistan Sir Creek border dispute stems from the demarcation "from the mouth of Sir Creek to the top of Sir Creek, and from the top of Sir Creek eastward to a point on the line designated on the Western Terminus". From this point onward, the boundary is unambiguously fixed as defined by the Tribunal Award of 1968.

== Etymology ==
Sir Creek was originally known as Ban Ganga. It was renamed Sir Creek after a representative of the British Raj.

== Geography ==
This marshy area is home to Russell's vipers and scorpions, which makes the lives of border soldiers difficult. During the monsoon season between June and September, the creek floods its banks and envelops the low-lying salty mudflats around it. During the winter season, the area is home to flamingoes and other migratory birds. The 24th parallel north passes through Sir Creek. Sir Creek is mainly fed by Nareri Lake, whose outlet joins the creek on its right bank. LBOD, a canal, also discharges water effluents into Sir Creek.

There are 17 major creeks in the Indus Delta, including the Sir Creek. On the Pakistani side are several other creeks to the west of Sir Creek, most of which are part of the Keti Bunder South Wildlife Sanctuary.

Sir Creek lies just to the west of the Great Rann of Kutch area of India. On the Indian side, Sir Creek is one of the six main creeks in this area, the others being Vian Wari Creek (Vianbari and Viyanbari), Pir Sanai, Pabevari, Padala (16 km (9.9 mi) southeast from Sir Creek), and easternmost Kori (34 km (21 mi) southeast from Sir Creek). All of these creeks are within the undisputed territory of India, except the westernmost creek, Sir Creek, which is claimed by both India and Pakistan. These evershifting creeks exit Indian territory, enter Pakistan, re-enter India, and vice versa, creating a hard-to-patrol, marshy wetland border with no physical barrier or fencing.

Two channels, the Harami Nala and Bondho Dhoro, are of specific concern to India for preventing infiltration and illegal activities. Vian Wari Creek (Vianbari and Viyanbari) on the Indian side enters Pakistan in the north, where is it called Harami Dhoro (bastard's stream); turns east and re-enters India, where it is called Harami Nala (bastard's drain); then splits into two streams, one of which re-enters Pakistan, which poses a strategic challenge for India for guarding against infiltration from Pakistan. The Bondho Dhoro channel, which enters India further north of Harami Nala in the Sujawal District of Sindh province of Pakistan, is another potential point of infiltration by boat. Chinese activities in the area are of concern, too, since China Bund just north of Bondho Dhoro was built with finances from China.

The Indian military Border Security Force (BSF) patrols Sir Creek up to midstream using floating border posts, amphibious vehicles, and foot travel by the Creek Crocodile Commandos. The coastal area of Sir Creek is manned by the Indian Coast Guard, and the larger open sea beyond is patrolled by the Indian Navy.

== Indo-Pakistani border dispute ==
The Green Line is the boundary as claimed by Pakistan, the red line is the boundary as claimed by India.

=== History ===
The dispute lies in the interpretation of the maritime boundary line between Pakistan and India. Before independence, the area was part of British India. After independence in 1947, Sindh became a part of Pakistan while Gujarat remained a part of India.

In 1968, an international tribunal resolved the larger Great Rann of Kutch border claims of India and Pakistan, which also covered Sir Creek. In this resolution, India received 90% of its request and Pakistan received 10%. Elements of dispute remain in Sir Creek with conflicting claims from both sides. From 1997 to 2012, there have been twelve rounds of talks between the two nations, without a breakthrough. In 2008, in the fourth round, both sides agreed to a joint map of the area based on a joint survey. Steps to resolve the dispute included allocation, delimitation, demarcation, and administration. Since neither side has conceded ground, India has proposed that the maritime boundary could be demarcated first, as per the provisions of Technical Aspects of Law of Sea (TALOS). However, Pakistan has refused the proposal because it feels that the dispute should be resolved first. Pakistan has also proposed that the two sides go in for international arbitration, which India has refused. India maintains that under the bilateral Simla Agreement, all bilateral disputes should be resolved without the intervention of third parties.

The resolution by the 1968 tribunal demarcated the boundaries between the two nations, and Pakistan claims that the creek was included as part of Sindh, thus setting the boundary as the eastern flank of the creek. Pakistan lays claim to the entire creek as per paragraphs 9 and 10 of the Sindh Government Resolution of 1914 signed between the Government of Sindh Division and Rao Maharaj of Kutch.

India disagrees with Pakistan's claims because in 1908, when the dispute arose between the Sindh Division and Rao Maharaj, the whole area was under the legal jurisdiction of the Bombay Presidency of British India, including the Sindh Division and the territory of Rao Maharaj. The Sindh Division was separated from the Bombay Presidency only on 1 April 1936 when it became the Sindh Province. The government of the Bombay Presidency conducted a survey in 1911 and awarded a dispute resolution verdict in 1914 containing two contradictory paragraphs. Paragraph 9 of the verdict states that the border between Kutch and Sindh lies to the east of Sir Creek, whereas paragraph 10 of the verdict further qualifies that "since Sir Creek is navigable most of the year, according to international law and the thalweg principle, a boundary can only be fixed in the middle of the navigable channel, which meant that it has been divided between Sindh and Kutch, and thereby India and Pakistan." The text of the resolution suggests that the resolution was based on the thalweg principle. India supports its stance by citing the thalweg doctrine in international law. The thalweg legal principle states that if the border between two political entities is stated to be a waterway without further description (e.g. a median line, right bank, eastern shore, low tide line, etc.), the boundary follows the thalweg of that watercourse; in particular, the boundary follows the center of the principal navigable channel of the waterway (which is presumably the deepest part). If there are multiple navigable channels in a river, the one principally used for downstream travel (likely having the strongest current) is used. When the thalweg principle is applied, the UNCLOS (United Nations Convention on the Law of the Sea) supports India's position, which "would result in the shifting of the land/sea terminus point several kilometres to the detriment of Pakistan, leading in turn to a loss of several thousand square kilometres of its Exclusive Economic Zone under the United Nations Convention on Law of the Sea."

India further argues for its position that the boundary lies mid-channel, as depicted in another map drawn in 1925 and implemented by the installation of mid-channel pillars back in 1924. Though Pakistan does not dispute the 1925 map, it maintains that the doctrine is not applicable in this case as it most commonly applies to non-tidal rivers, and Sir Creek is a tidal estuary. India rejects the Pakistani stance by maintaining that the creek is navigable at high tide, the thalweg principle is used for international boundaries in tidal waters, and fishing trawlers use Sir Creek to go out to sea.

Another point of concern for Pakistan is that Sir Creek has changed its course considerably over the years. If the boundary line is demarcated according to the thalweg principle applied to the current channel, Pakistan and India would both lose small amounts of wetland territory that were historically part of their provinces.

=== Economic reasons for the dispute ===
Though the creek has little military value, it offers immense economic gain. Much of the region is rich in oil and gas below the sea bed, and control over the creek would have a huge bearing on the energy potential of each nation. Also, defining the boundaries would help in the determination of the maritime boundaries, which are drawn as an extension of onshore reference points. Maritime boundaries also help in determining the limits of Exclusive Economic Zones (EEZs) and continental shelves. EEZs extend to 200 nautical miles (370 km) and can be subjected to commercial exploitation.

The demarcation would also prevent the inadvertent crossing over of fishers of both nations into each other's territories. In contrast to economic reasons described by India and Pakistan, fishers of both countries get trapped in conflict and their economic rights of earning are affected. The governments of India and Pakistan regularly arrest fishers of the other nation for crossing the boundary; however, a conventional fisher may not know where the boundary starts and ends in the sea. Wind flow, waves, and turbulence that move the boat in the sea add to this unawareness. UN law advocates a minimum penalty for this offense and release of boats, but the governments of India and Pakistan catch these fishers and keep them in prisons for a long time. Their release happens through the land boundary of India and Pakistan (Wagha border), so these fishers return to their home country without their boats.

Pakistan built the LBOD canal between 1987 and 1997 to collect agricultural saline water and industrial effluents generated in the area around the main Indus river. The LBOD canal discharges the saline and contaminated water into the Sir Creek for disposal to the sea without contaminating the freshwater available in the Indus River. However, the LBOD construction is in violation of the Indus Waters Treaty (Article IV), causing material damage (i.e. inundating the creek area exposed during the low tide) to India. Thus Pakistan has an economic interest in keeping the dispute alive and not settled as per international conventions. If India is physically holding (partially or fully) the water area of the creek, India can settle the LBOD dispute as per the arbitration procedure available in the Indus Waters Treaty.

=== Incidents ===
==== The Atlantique incident ====
This disputed region is known for the Atlantique Incident that occurred on August 10, 1999. Indian Air Force MiG-21FL fighters shot down a Pakistan Navy reconnaissance plane, the Breguet Atlantique, which was carrying 16 naval officers on board, for an alleged airspace violation of Indian airspace. The episode took place just a month after the Kargil War, creating a tense atmosphere between India and Pakistan.

After the incident, Pakistan Marine units were deployed in the region, with sizable SAMs active in the region. In 1999, the Marines reportedly fired an errant missile on an Indian Air Force MiG-21FL, which narrowly missed. Additional marine battalions and sniper recon units have been deployed in the Sir Creek region.

==== Military buildup and terrorist alert ====
From June 2019, several newspapers reported that Pakistan had rapidly built up forces at Sir Creek, and India swiftly responded likewise. After the 1999 Atlantique incident, Pakistan deployed its 31st Creek Battalion, headquartered at Sujawal and responsible for the area from Haji Moro Jat Creek in the north to Korangi Creek Cantonment in Karachi in the south. In 2019, Pakistan also deployed the 32nd Creek Battalion, headquartered at Gharo, with the view to increase the troop strength to three brigades by deploying more infantry and amphibious battalions. Pakistan has procured 6 coastal defense boats for coastal surveillance, and 4 of 18 newly acquired marine assault crafts will be deployed in the Sir Creek. Pakistan is planning to buy 60 more naval ships, including hovercraft and offshore patrol boats. Pakistan has also set up two new marine posts west of Pir Samadhi Creek in the area of Bandha Dhora and Harami Dhoro. Pakistan also has its 21st Air Defense unit and three marine units at Gwadar Port as well as the Jinnah Naval Base at Ormara. Pakistan has also boosted its air defense with an enhanced radar network, air defense missiles, radar operated guns, four Lockheed P-3 Orion anti-submarine and maritime surveillance aircraft, and two ATR aircraft stationed at Pakistan Air Force's PAF Base Masroor in Karachi and PNS Mehran naval airbase.

In 2018, India's BSF caught 14 boats in the Bandha Dhora and Harami Dhoro channels of the creek. Each one was screened to ascertain if they were ordinary fishers or terrorists because the Pakistani terrorists of the 2008 Mumbai attacks had entered India after launching their boat from this general area of Pakistan. On 9 September 2019, after abandoned boats were found by the Indian Army in Sir Creek, India issued an alert regarding a potential terror attack.

== See also ==
- Indo-Pakistani wars and conflicts
