= List of run-of-the-river hydroelectric power stations =

The following page lists hydroelectric power stations that generate power using the run-of-the-river method. This list includes most power stations that are larger than 100 MW in maximum net capacity, which are currently operational or under construction. Those power stations that are smaller than 100 MW, and those that are only at a planning/proposal stage, may be found in regional lists, are listed at the end of the page.

== Hydroelectric power stations ==
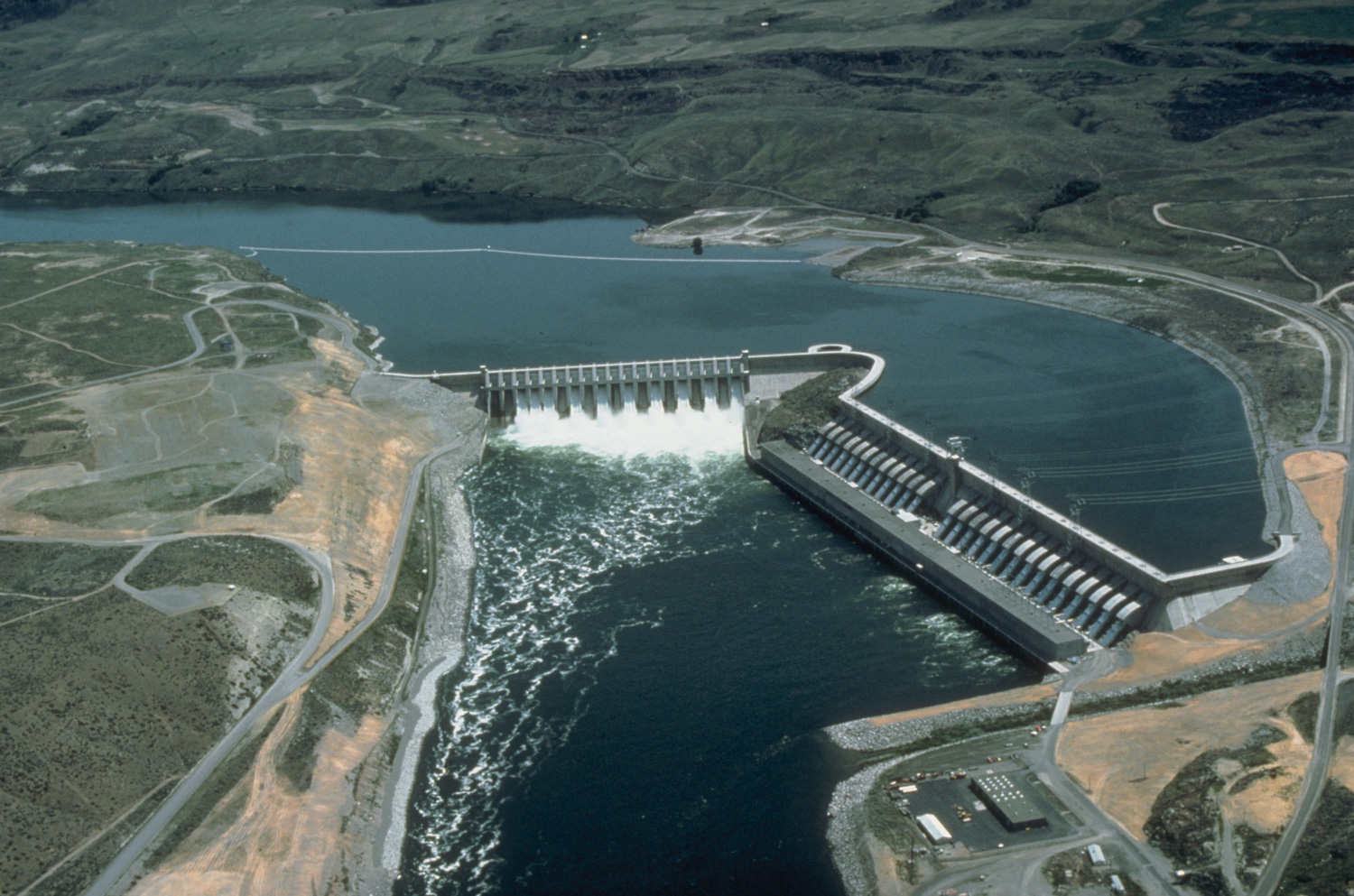
The Chief Joseph Dam

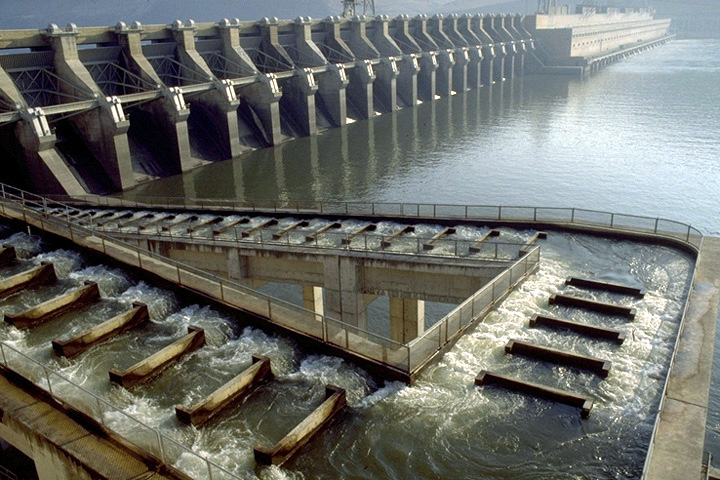
The John Day Dam and its fish ladder

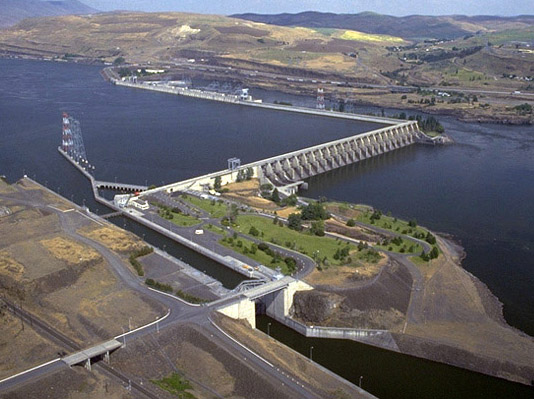
The Dalles Dam

This table lists currently operational power stations. Some of these may have additional units under construction, but only current net capacity is listed.

Station	Country	Location	Capacity (MW)	Ref
Allai Khwar Hydropower Plant	Pakistan	34°51′30″N 73°01′15″E	121	
Angu Hydropower Station	China	29°30′12″N 103°37′45″E	772	
Asahan 1 Hydroelectric Power Station	Indonesia		180	
Baglihar Dam	India	33°09′43″N 75°19′40″E	450	
Beauharnois Hydroelectric Power Station	Canada	45°18′50″N 73°54′32″W	1,903	
Bersimis-2 generating station	Canada	49°10′02″N 69°14′26″W	869	
Birecik Dam	Turkey	37°03′12″N 37°53′24″E	672	
Bonneville Dam	United States	45°38′39″N 121°56′26″W	1,242	
Caojie Hydropower Station	China		500	
Carillon Generating Station	Canada	45°34′07″N 74°23′01″W	753	
Chief Joseph Dam	United States	47°59′43″N 119°38′00″W	2,620	
Chibro Power Plant	India	30°33′23″N 77°47′53″E	240	
Chilla Power Plant	India	29°58′34″N 78°13′11″E	144	
Dalles Dam	United States	45°36′44″N 121°08′04″W	1,878	
Dharasu Power Station	India	30°36′26″N 78°19′09″E	304	
Duber Khwar Hydroelectric Plant	Pakistan	35°2′16″N 72°53′57″E	130	
Dul Hasti Hydroelectric Plant	India	33°22′06.69″N 75°47′55.66″E	390	
Gabčíkovo - Vodná elektráreň	Slovakia	47°52′48″N 17°32′19″E	720	
Gezhouba Water Control & Hydroelectric Project	China	30°44′23″N 111°16′20″E	2,715	
Ghazi-Barotha Hydropower Project	Pakistan	33°46′48″N 72°15′35″E	1,450	
Gilgel Gibe II Power Station	Ethiopia	07°45′25″N 37°33′44″E	420	
Golen Gol Hydropower Project	Pakistan	35°55′16.17″N 72°00′51.64″E	105.9	
Gouina Hydroelectric Plant	Mali	14°00′41.40″N 11°5′59.8″W	140	
Hunderfossen	Norway	61°13′02″N 10°26′22″E	116	
Inga dams	DRC	5°31′S 13°37.3′E	1,775	
Jean-Lesage generating station	Canada	49°19′17″N 68°22′12″W	1,145	
Jirau Dam	Brazil	9°15′0″S 64°24′0″W	3,750	
Jiulong Pianqiao Hydropower Station	China		228	
John Day Dam	United States	45°52′49″N 120°41′40″W	2,160	
Kakhovka Hydroelectric Power Plant	Ukraine	46°46′34.12″N 33°22′17.44″E	357	
Kaligandaki A Hydroelectric Power Station	Nepal	27°58′44.88″N 83°34′49.68″E	144	
Karcham Wangtoo Hydroelectric Plant	India	31°32′35.53″N 78°00′54.80″E	1,000	
Kaunas Hydroelectric Power Plant	Lithuania	54°52′27″N 23°59′56″E	100.8	
Kettle Generating Station	Canada	56°23′03″N 94°38′06″W	1,220	
Khodri Power Plant	India	30°30′30″N 77°47′59″E	120	
Kishanganga Hydroelectric Plant	India	34°38′51″N 74°45′53″E	330	
Koteshwar Dam	India	30°15′37″N 78°29′53″E	200	
Kyiv Hydroelectric Power Plant	Ukraine	50°35′18″N 30°30′44″E	418.8	
Kykkelsrud Fossumfoss	Norway	59°34′48″N 11°06′06″E	230	
La Grande-1 generating station	Canada	53°44′04″N 78°34′25″W	1,436	
Lay Dam	United States	32°57′49″N 86°31′00″W	177	
Limestone Generating Station	Canada	55°30′25″N 94°06′25″W	1,340	
Little Goose Dam	United States	46°35′15″N 118°01′34″W	932	
Long Spruce Generating Station	Canada	56°24′1″N 94°22′10″W	1,010	
Lower Granite Dam	United States	46°39′38″N 117°25′41″W	932	
Lower Jarula	India	16°19′N 77°47′E	240	
Lower Monumental Dam	United States	46°33′45″N 118°32′15″W	932	
Maheshwar Hydropower Plant	India		400	
McNary Dam	United States	45°55′47″N 119°17′46″W	1,127	
Muli Shawan Hydro Power Station	China		240	
Nathpa Jhakri Dam	India	31°33′50″N 77°58′49″E	1,500	
Neelum–Jhelum Hydropower Plant	Pakistan	34°23′34″N 73°43′08″E	969	
Outardes-2 generating station	Canada	49°09′03″N 68°23′23″W	523	
Outardes-3 generating station	Canada	49°33′45″N 68°45′08″W	1,026	
Pandoh Dam (Dehar)	India	31°40′17″N 77°04′01″E	990	
Pulangi IV Hydroelectric Power Plant	Philippines	7°42′56″N 125°1′25″E	255	
Qiaogong Hydropower Station	China		456	
Rampur Hydropower Station	India		412	
Ranganadi Dam	India	27°20′34″N 93°49′0″E	405	
Rheinfelden Hydropower Plant	Germany	47°34′8″N 7°48′45″E	100	
Rongzehai Hydropower Station	China		240	
Rånåsfoss	Norway	60°01′39″N 11°19′24″E	125	
Sarpefossen	Norway	59°16′34″N 11°07′51″E	162	
Santo Antonio Dam	Brazil	8°48′6″S 63°57′3″W	3,580	
Shringar	India	30°12′N 78°48′E	330	
Shuhe Hydropower Station	China		270	
Solbergfoss	Norway	59°38′14″N 11°09′19″E	208	
Tala Hydroelectric Power Station	Bhutan	26°50′26.36″N 089°35′12.55″E	1,020	
Teles Pires Dam	Brazil	09°20′26″S 56°46′37″W	1,820	
Tianshengqiao-II Hydropower Station	China	24°57′47″N 105°09′21″E	1,320	
Vamma	Norway	59°32′29″N 11°10′12″E	344	
Xayaburi Dam	Laos	19°14′34.4″N 101°49′06.4″E	1,285	
Xuecheng Hydropower Station	China		138	
Zhentouba Hydropower Station	China	29°14′09″N 103°02′46″E	720	

=== Under construction ===
This table lists stations under construction or operational stations with under-construction and current net capacity over 100 MW.

Station	Country	Location	Capacity (MW)	Expected completion	Ref
Dasu Dam	Pakistan	35°19′1.8804″N 73°11′36.3804″E	4,320	2028	
Kohala Hydropower Project	Pakistan		1,124	2025	
Punatsangchhu-I Hydropower Plant	Bhutan		1,200	2025	

== See also ==
- List of largest power stations in the world
- List of pumped-storage hydroelectric power stations
- List of hydroelectric power station failures
