= Salal Dam =

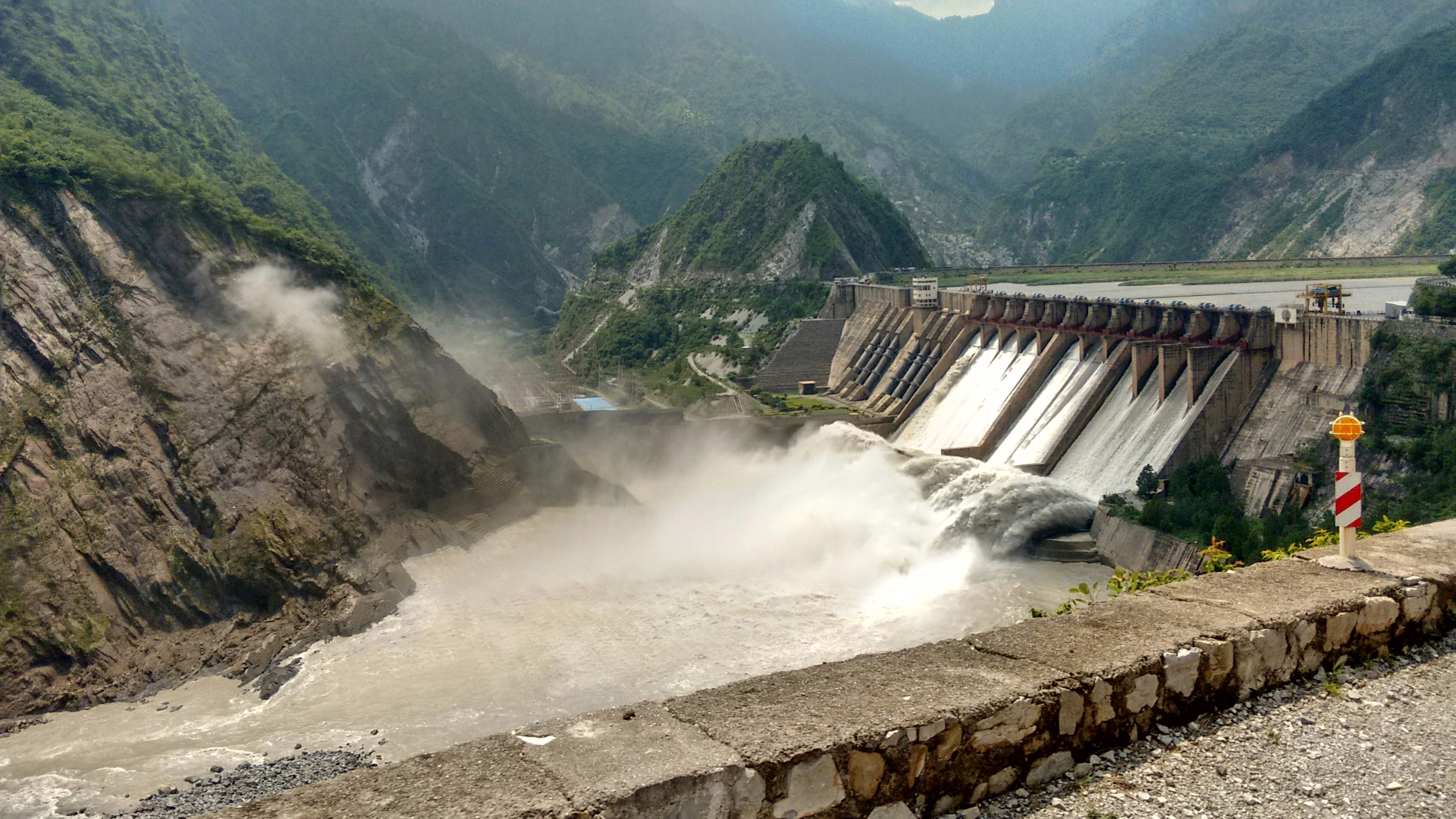
- View of Salal Dam from Jyotipuram-Salal road

- Location of Salal Dam in Jammu and Kashmir Salal Dam (India)
- Official name: Salal Hydroelectric Power Station
- Country: India
- Location: Jammu and Kashmir
- Coordinates: 33°08′33″N 74°48′37″E
- Status: Operational
- Construction began: 1970
- Opening date: 1987
- Construction cost: ₹ 928.89 crores

Dam and spillways
- Type of dam: Gravity dam
- Impounds: Chenab River
- Height: 113 m (370.7 ft)
- Length: 487 m (1,597.8 ft)
- Dam volume: 1,450,000 m^{3} (51,210,000 ft^{3})
- Spillways: 12
- Spillway type: Ogee
- Spillway capacity: 22,427 m^{3}/s

Reservoir
- Creates: Salal Lake
- Total capacity: 280,860,000 m^{3} (228,000 acre⋅ft)
- Active capacity: 12,000,000 m^{3} (10,000 acre⋅ft)
- Surface area: 3.74 km^{2} (1.44 sq mi)
- Normal elevation: 487.68 m FRL

Power Station
- Operator: NHPC
- Commission date: Stage I: 1987; Stage II: 1995
- Type: Conventional
- Hydraulic head: 94.5 m (310 ft)
- Turbines: Stage I: 3 x 115 MW Francis-type; Stage II: 3 x 115 MW Francis-type
- Installed capacity: Stage I: 345 MW; Stage II: 345 MW; Total: 690 MW
- Annual generation: 3082 million kWh
- Website nhpcindia.com

Salal Dam (Hindi: सलाल बाँध Salāl Bāndh), also known as Salal Hydroelectric Power Station, is a run-of-the-river hydropower project on the Chenab River in the Reasi district of Jammu and Kashmir. It was the first hydropower project built by India in Jammu and Kashmir under the Indus Water Treaty regime. After having reached a bilateral agreement with Pakistan in 1978, with significant concessions made to Pakistan in the design of the dam, reducing its height, eliminating operating pool, and plugging the under-sluices meant for sediment management, India completed the project in 1987. The concessions made in the interest of bilateralism damaged the long-term sustainability of the dam, which silted up in five years. It ran at 57% capacity factor. (Note: At full capacity, a power station generates 8.76 million units (kWh) per megawatt of installed capacity. In early 1990s, Chenab projects produced 6.93 million units per installed MW. From 2012 to 2013, Salal produced only 4.74 million units, with a small improvement to 5.06 million units in 2014–15.) In May 2025, India suspended the Indus Waters Treaty, and de-silted the reservoir restoring some of the plant's power generation capacity.

== Location ==
The project is located on the Chenab River near the Salal village in the Reasi District, a few kilometres south of Matlot where the river turns to a southerly course. Pakistan's Marala Headworks is 72 km (45 mi) downstream, from where the Marala–Ravi Link Canal and the Upper Chenab Canal carry water to various parts of Pakistani Punjab.

== History ==
=== Conception ===
The Salal project was conceived in 1920. Feasibility studies on the project commenced in 1961 by the Government of Jammu and Kashmir and a project design was readied by 1968. Construction was started in 1970 by the Central Hydroelectric Project Control Board (under the Government of India's Ministry of Irrigation and Power). The design of the project contained a two-stage powerhouse generating 690 MW power making use of the head created by the dam.

=== Indus waters dispute ===
Under the Indus Waters Treaty of 1960, the Chenab River is allocated to Pakistan for exploitation (one of the 'Western Rivers' – Indus, Jhelum and Chenab). India has rights to use the river for "non-consumptive" uses such as power generation. India is obliged under the treaty to inform Pakistan of its intent to build a project six months prior to construction and take into account any concerns raised by the latter.

Since Pakistan lost the three eastern rivers to India by the treaty, its dependence on the Chenab river increased. It viewed the Salal project with great concern. Even limited storage in a relatively low dam upstream was viewed as a flood risk, even a threat, whereby India could flood Pakistan's farm lands by a sudden release of water. Equally, India could hold back water in its reservoir starving them of water. Zulfiqar Ali Bhutto, foreign minister and later prime minister, argued that the dam could be used strategically as an instrument of war to bog down Pakistan's armour. After the two wars of 1965 and 1971, all such theories were easily believable.

During the negotiations, Pakistan raised technical objections to the design and capacity of the dam. It argued that the 40-foot gates on the spillways gave the dam more storage than allowed by the treaty. It also argued that the under-sluices included for sediment clearing were not permitted under the treaty. (Note: The Indus Waters Treaty actually states (Annexure D, Paragraph 8): "There shall be no outlets below the Dead Storage Level, unless necessary for sediment control or any other technical purpose; any such outlet shall be of the minimum size, and located at the highest level, consistent with the sound and economical design and with satisfactory operation of the works.") Indians argued that the flood risk that Pakistanis expressed was unreasonable. Any intention on India's part to flood Pakistan would involve causing much more damage to its own territory. In the face of Pakistan's unwillingness to relent, the Indian negotiators wanted to take it to arbitration by a neutral expert, as provided for in the treaty.

However, after signing the 1972 Simla Agreement with Pakistan, India wanted to steer the relations towards bilateralism. Its foreign policy establishment ruled out going to a neutral expert. In further bilateral talks in October 1976, India made significant concessions in the dam's height and other issues. An agreement was reached in 1977, but deferred till after the elections in Pakistan. Soon afterwards, change of government occurred in both India and Pakistan, but the understanding survived. (Note: In Pakistan, General Zia-ul-Haq came to power overthrowing Zulfikar Ali Bhutto's government. In India, the Janata Party won the elections in 1977.)

A formal agreement was signed in Delhi on 12 April 1978 by Indian foreign minister Atal Bihari Vajpayee and Pakistan's foreign secretary Agha Shahi. The height of spillway gates was reduced from 40 ft to 30 ft. The under-sluices designed for sediment management were permanently plugged. The agreement was hailed as a triumph of bilateralism, facilitating an atmosphere of trust and confidence between the two countries. But the agreement also seriously damaged the sustainability of the dam and the Indian engineers viewed it as too high a price to pay for bilateralism.

=== Final construction ===
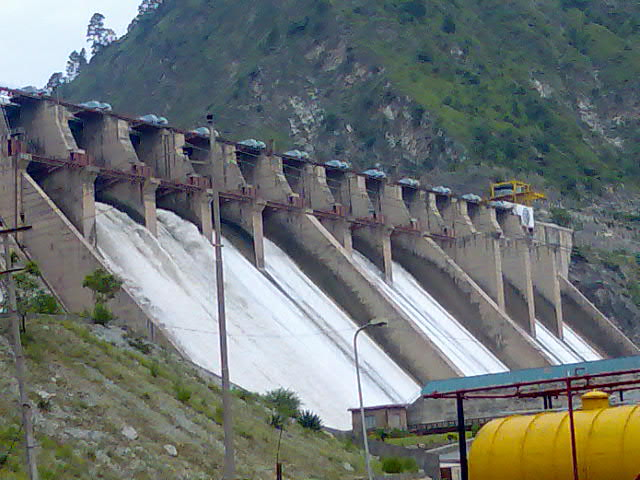
Spillway at the top of the Concrete Dam

After signing the agreement in 1978, the construction of the project was entrusted to National Hydroelectric Power Corporation (NHPC) on an agency basis. NHPC was incorporated by the Government of India in 1975, with an authorised capital of Rs. 200 crore. The Salal project was its first project.

The Stage-I of the powerhouse was commissioned in 1987; Stage-II between 1993 and 1995. The final commissioning of the project took place in 1996.

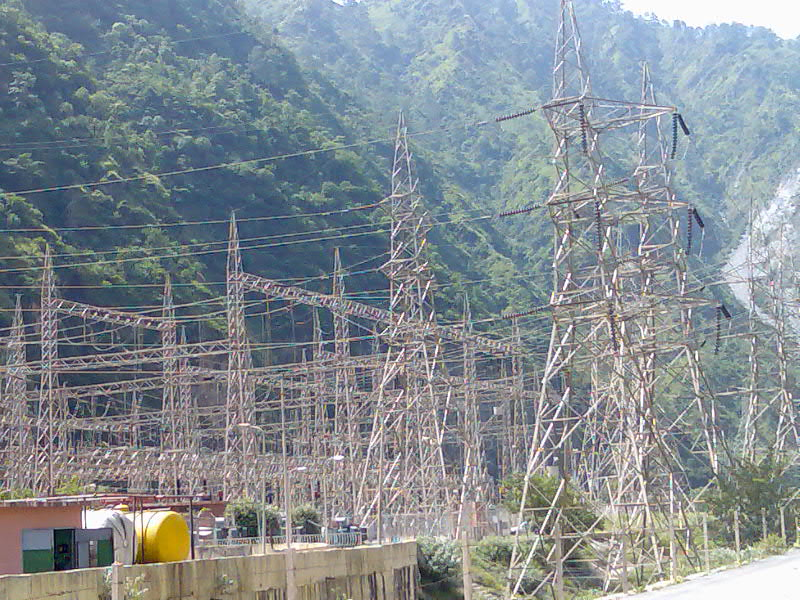
Salal power Station

After completion, the Salal project was transferred to NHPC on an ownership basis. The Government of Jammu and Kashmir is said to have had a Memorandum of Understanding with the Government of India to receive the project at a depreciated cost. However, according to the National Conference party, the coalition government in power at 1985, run by the Ghulam Mohammad Shah-wing of the National Conference and the Indian National Congress, surrendered the state's rights over the project.

The state of Jammu and Kashmir receives 12.5 percent of the energy generated from the project. The rest is transmitted to the Northern Grid where it is distributed to the states of Punjab, Haryana, Delhi, Himachal Pradesh, Rajasthan, and Uttar Pradesh. Jammu and Kashmir also purchases additional power at regular prices.

=== Siltation ===
Sediment is a serious problem among Himalayan rivers (since the Himalayas are young mountains). The Chenab river, especially, carries more silt than the others even among the 'Western Rivers'. Its annual silt load is estimated to be 32,000,000 m^{3} (26,000 acre⋅ft).

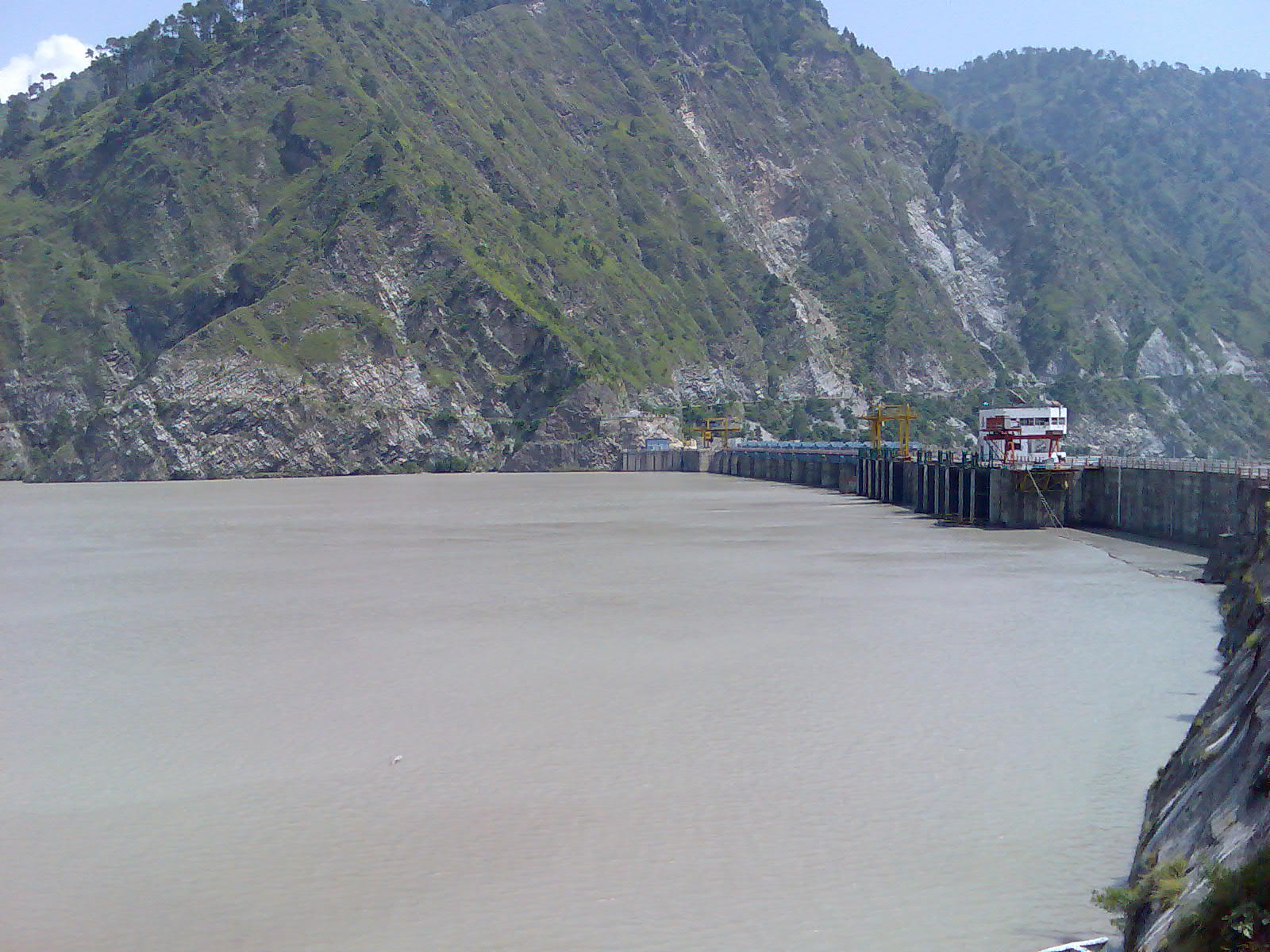
The silted reservoir, with the crest of the dam to the right

From the very first year of operation, the reservoir of the Salal dam started silting up. Two severe floods in 1988 and 1992 further accelerated the siltation. Within five years, the reservoir got silted up almost entirely. As a result, the reservoir capacity got reduced from the intended 231,000 acre⋅ft (285,000,000 m^{3}) to 7,000 acre⋅ft (9,000,000 m^{3}).

As per the 1978 Salal agreement, the reservoir had to be maintained at Constant Full Reservoir Level at 487.68 m above sea level. Six under-sluices that were provided during the construction had to be plugged at the beginning of operation. Consequently, the 9.14 m (30 ft) high spillway gates form the only live storage of the reservoir. The rest is dead storage, which ended up acting as a siltation tank. To alleviate the problem, the spillway gates are being opened at least once a month during the monsoon season as a desilting mechanism, with a discharge of about 4,250 cumecs. This is reported to have recovered some of the reservoir capacity, increasing it to 13,950,000 m^{3} (11,309 acre⋅ft) as of July 2025.

As the spillway and the power intake are continuously passing sand, they cause abrasion damage to the spillway concrete structure and the turbine equipment. Studies report erosion in the civil structures such as the concrete sill of the spillway, the glacis and the bucket; damage to the turbine components such as cracks in the turbine blades, knife edging of the outer edges and washing out of other components; damage to the cooling system such as tubes being choked with stator faults encountered. NHPC has been using various technical remedies to address these problems.

The silt accumulation has essentially converted the reservoir into an elevated river bed. The situation is reported to be alarming and the future of the project uncertain. "During winters when water level goes abysmally down, it does not generate much [power]," according to a state official. In 2014–2015, the two powerhouses reported producing 3491 million KWH, representing 57% capacity factor.

=== Recent developments ===
In April 2025, India suspended the Indus Waters Treaty, and used the opportunity to de-silt the Salal dam to some extent.

== Technical parameters ==
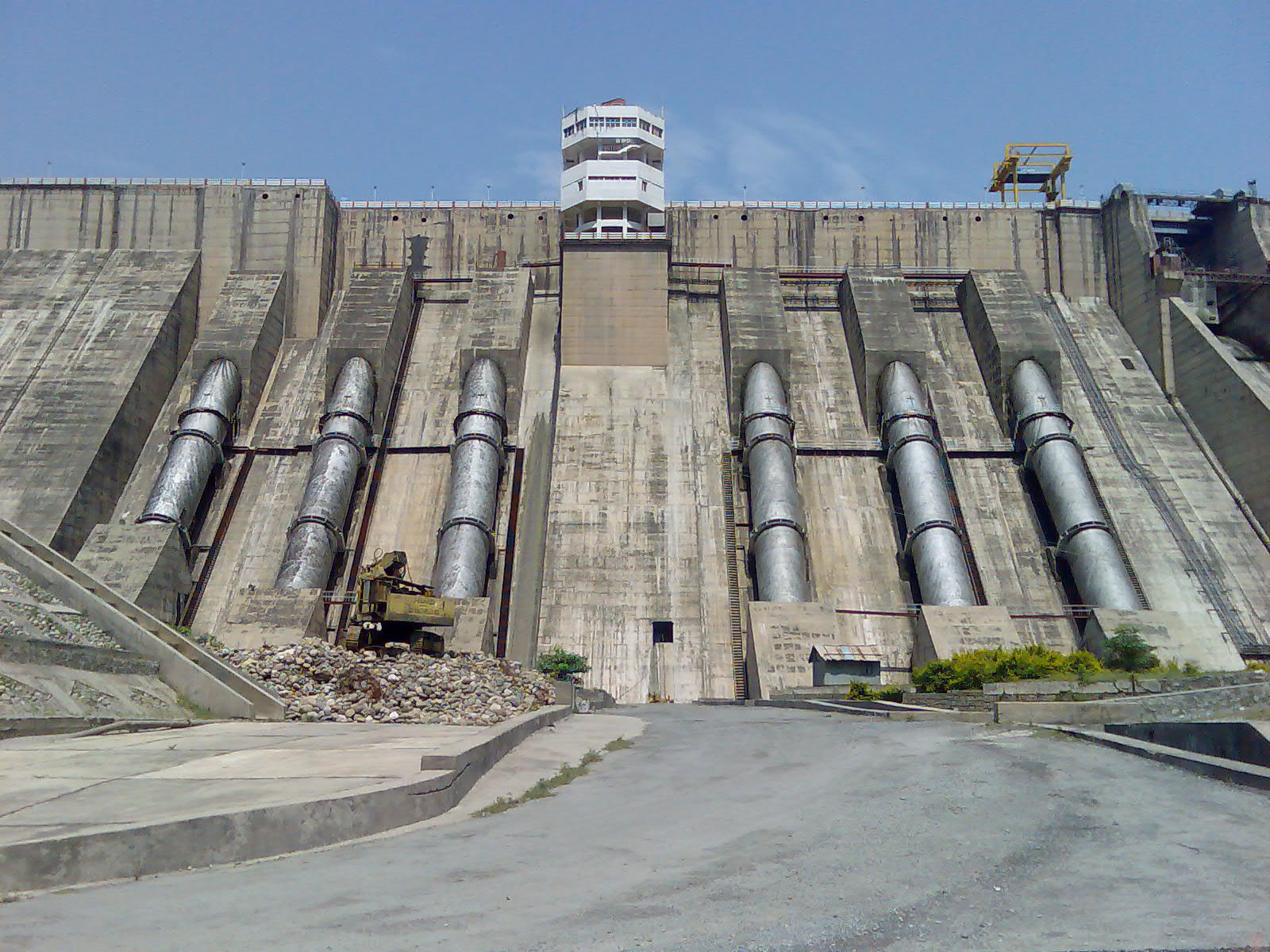
Penstocks, used to move gushing water from dam to turbine

The original Indian design provided for a 130-metre-high dam up to an elevation of 1,627 ft above sea level, a 40 ft gated spillway at the top (between elevations 1,560–1,600 ft) and 6 under-sluices at elevation 1,365 ft. The under-sluices would have enabled the 'drawdown flushing' of sediments. (Note: Drawdown flushing is a technique of sediment management, whereby the reservoir is drawn down to some level above that of under-sluices ("minimum drawdown level") before a flooding season. The gates of the spillway are kept open as the flood arrives, allowing it to wash away settled sediment.) However, at Pakistan's insistence, the under-sluices were permanently plugged with concrete, and the gates were reduced from 40 ft to 30 ft. This meant that the only live storage is between elevations 1,570–1,600 ft, and the storage below that level has gotten silted up, forming an elevated river bed. The level of the bed now varies between 477 m (1,565 ft) and 484 m (1,588 ft).

=== Dam ===
- Top elevation: 495.91 m (1,627 ft) asl
- Maximum water level: 494.08 m (1,621 ft) asl
- Full Reservoir level: 487.68 m (1,600 ft) asl
- Dead storage level: 478.68 m (1,570 ft) asl
- Operating pool: Nil
- Length of power dam: 105 m
- Length of non overflow dam: 125 m
- Type of gate: Radial
- Deepest foundation level: 383 m
- No of river sluices: 6 of 3.35 m x 4.57 m

=== Tailrace tunnel ===
- Number: 2
- Length Stage 1: 2.463 km
- Stage 2: 2.523 km
- Shape: Horseshoe
- Diameter: 11 m (finished)
- Design discharge: 412 m^{3}/s
- Velocity: 4.2 m/s

=== Transmission lines ===
- Name of Grid: Northern grid
- Transmission Voltage: 220 kV
- Total length of lines: 446 km
- Double circuit Salal - Kishenpur: 2 lines
- Single circuit Salal - Jammu: 2 lines

== See also ==
- Baglihar Dam
- Ratle Hydroelectric Plant
- Kishanganga Hydroelectric Plant
- Chenab river dams and hydroelectric projects
- Rivers of Jammu and Kashmir
- List of dams and reservoirs in India

== Bibliography ==
- Alam, S. (3–4 February 2004). "Sedimentation management in hydro reservoirs". hydrocoop.org. Water India – 4 Conference / Hydro Coop web site (published 16 August 2013).
- Akhtar, Shaheen (Autumn 2010), "Emerging Challenges to Indus Waters Treaty: Issues of compliance & transboundary impacts of Indian hydroprojects on the Western Rivers", Regional Studies, XXVIII (4), Institute of Regional Studies: 3–66 – via academia.edu
- Akhter, Majed (11 May 2013), "Geopolitics of Dam Design on the Indus", Economic and Political Weekly, 48 (19): 24–26, JSTOR 23527337
- Bakshi, Gitanjali; Trivedi, Sahiba (2011), The Indus Equation (PDF), Strategic Foresight Group
- Dar, Zubair Ahmad (2012), Power Projects in Jammu & Kashmir: Controversy, Law and Justice (PDF), Harvard Law & International Development Society
- Darde, P.N. (2016). "Detrimental effects of tiny silt particles on large hydro power stations and some remedies". Perspectives in Science. 8: 142–145. Bibcode:2016PerSc...8..142D. doi:10.1016/j.pisc.2016.04.018.
- Raghavan, T. C. A. (2019), The People Next Door: The Curious History of India's Relations with Pakistan, Oxford University Press, ISBN 978-1-78738-019-6
- Tabassum, Shaista (2001), "The Role of CBMs in Resolving Non-military Issues between India and Pakistan: A Case Study of the Indus Water Treaty", in Moonis Ahmar (ed.), The Challenge of Confidence-building Measures in South Asia, Har-Anand Publications, ISBN 978-81-241-0840-6
- Vishvanathan, N. (2000), "Silt Disposal from Reservoirs", in C.V.J. Varma; B.S.K. Naidu; A.R.G. Rao (eds.), Silting Problems in Hydro Power Plants: Proceedings of the First International Conference, New Delhi, India, 13-15th October 1999, CRC Press, pp. I-1 – I-12, ISBN 978-90-5410-799-6
- Zawahri, Neda A. (2009). "India, Pakistan and cooperation along the Indus River system". Water Policy. 11 (1): 1–20. doi:10.2166/wp.2009.010.
