= Neelum–Jhelum Hydropower Plant =

Hydropower station in Azad Kashmir, Pakistan

Neelum–Jhelum Dam
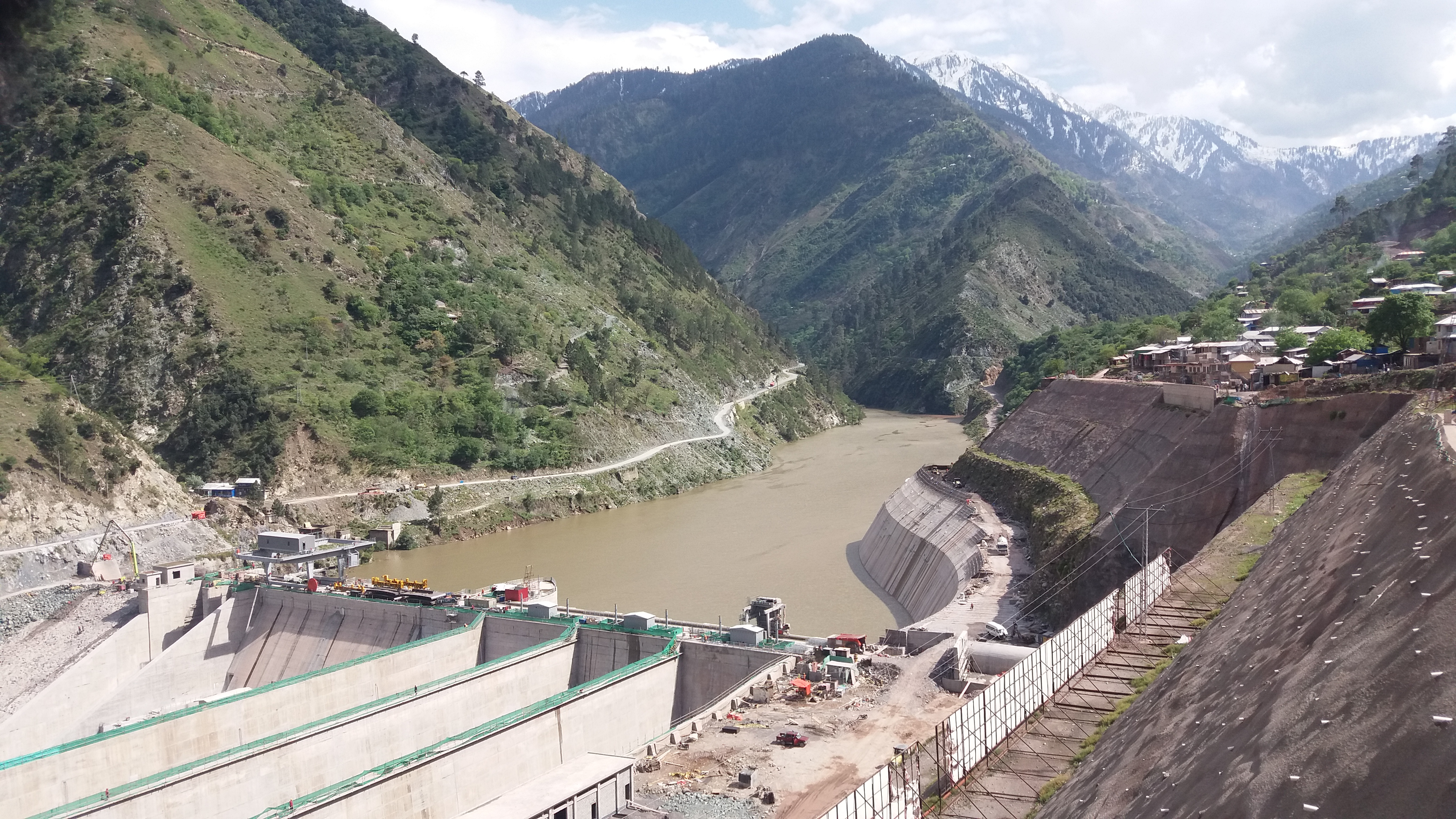
- LOT-C1, Neelum Jhelum Hydropower Project
- Interactive map of Neelum–Jhelum Dam
- Country: Pakistan
- Location: Muzaffarabad
- Coordinates: 34°23′34″N 73°43′08″E
- Status: Operational
- Construction began: 2008
- Opening date: 14 August 2018
- Construction cost: Rs. 515 Billion ($5.1 billion)
- Owner: Water and Power Development Authority

Dam and spillways
- Type of dam: Concrete gravity
- Impounds: Neelum River
- Height: 60 m (197 ft)
- Length: 125 m (410 ft)
- Dam volume: 156,000 m^{3} (204,040 cu yd)

Reservoir
- Total capacity: 8,000,000 m^{3} (6,486 acre⋅ft)

Neelum-Jhelum Hydropower Plant
- Coordinates: 34°11′54″N 73°30′41″E
- Commission date: March 2018
- Type: Conventional, diversion
- Hydraulic head: 420 m (1,378 ft)
- Turbines: 4 x 242.25 MW Francis-type
- Installed capacity: 969 MW
- Capacity factor: 54.8%
- Annual generation: 4,630 GWh

The Neelum–Jhelum Hydropower Plant is part of a run-of-the-river hydroelectric power project in Pakistan administered Kashmir, designed to divert water from the Neelum River to a power station on the Jhelum River. The power station is located 42 km (26 mi) south of Muzaffarabad, and has an installed capacity of 969 MW.

Construction on the project began in 2008 after a Chinese consortium was awarded the construction contract in July 2007. After many years of delays, the first generator was commissioned in April 2018 and the entire project was completed in August 2018 when the fourth and last unit was synchronized with the national grid on 13 August and attained its maximum generation capacity of 969 MW on 14 August 2018, and on a few occasions reached 1040 MW production, which is beyond its planned capacity.

The plant was planned to generate 5,150 GWh (gigawatt hour) per year at the levelised tariff of Rs 13.50 per unit for 30 years, but was adversely impacted by India's completion of the Kishanganga Hydroelectric Project upstream, which reduced water flow to Neelum–Jhelum. In 2024, electricity generation was first restricted and then stopped after a fall in head race tunnel pressure. The plant was reportedly damaged by Indian shelling during the 2025 India–Pakistan conflict.

== Design and operation ==
The Neelum–Jhelum Dam is a 60 m (197 ft) tall and 125 m (410 ft) long gravity dam. It withholds a pondage (reservoir) with a 8,000,000 m^{3} (6,486 acre⋅ft) capacity of which 2,800,000 m^{3} (2,270 acre⋅ft) is peak storage. The dam diverts up to 280 m^{3}/s (9,888 cu ft/s) of the Neelum southeast into a 28.5 km (18 mi) long head-race tunnel, the first 15.1 km (9 mi) of the head-race is two tunnels which later meet into one. The tunnel passes 380 m (1,247 ft) below the Jhelum River and through its bend. At the terminus of the tunnel, the water reaches the surge chamber which contains a 341 m (1,119 ft) tall surge shaft (to prevent water hammer) and a 820 m (2,690 ft) long surge tunnel. From the surge chamber, the water is split into four different penstocks which feed each of the four 242.25 MW Francis turbine-generators in the underground power house. After being used to generate electricity, the water is discharged southeast back into the Jhelum River at 34°10′29″N 73°29′34″E through a 3.5 km (2 mi) long tail-race tunnel. The drop in elevation between the dam and power station affords an average hydraulic head of 420 m (1,378 ft).

== History ==
After being approved in 1989, the design was improved, increasing the tunnel length and generation capacity. The project was intended to begin in 2002 and be completed in 2008 but this time-frame experienced significant delays due to problems meeting rising costs. Additionally, the 2005 Kashmir earthquake which devastated the region required a redesign of the project to conform to more stringent seismic standards.

On 7 July 2007, the China consortium CGGC-CMEC (Gezhouba Group and China National Machinery Import and Export Corporation) were offered a contract to construct the dam and power station. Terms were settled by the end of the year and in January 2008, the letter of commencement was issued. On 8 February, Pakistan's President Pervez Musharraf announced that the project would begin. In October 2011, the diversion tunnel required to reroute the Neelum River around the dam site was completed.

On 1 November, Pakistan's Prime Minister Syed Yusuf Raza Gilani publicly stated his concern for the project's delay. At its appraisal in 1989, it was to cost $167 million USD (2011) and after another redesign in 2005, that cost rose to $935 million USD (2011). Currently costs have risen to $2.89 billion USD (2011). The project was constructed under the supervision of the Water and Power Development Authority (WAPDA) and funding was achieved through the Neelum Jhelum Hydropower Company, taxes, bond offerings, middle-eastern and Chinese banks. WAPDA successfully secured loans from a consortium of Chinese banks and from Middle East. Tunnel-boring machines (TBM) were brought to help speed up the excavation of the remaining tunnels. They became operational in February 2013. The project was 66 percent complete as of August 2013 while at the same time the diversion tunnel was 75 percent complete. US$475 million in funding was still not secured by the Economic Affairs Division at that time. In mid-2014, Prime Minister Nawaz Sharif visited the construction site and expressed the hope that at least one generator would be operational by mid-2015. On 24 December 2014 a wall near the diversion tunnel's intake collapsed, killing four workers including a Chinese engineer. On 5 November 2016, the project entered into terminal phase with 100 percent perfect design while achieving 85.5 percent progress and is heading towards completion despite all delays in release of funds, weather conditions, non-availability of power during early stage of construction and delays in land acquisition.

In March 2017, it was reported that the cost of the dam had escalated to PKR 500 billion. thus the cost of electricity from Neelum Jhelum will be Pakistani Rupees 20 per unit.

All the civil work including tunnel boring, installation of generators and turbines was completed and water filling of the dam began on 17 October 2017 to put it on the test.

In October 2017, residents of Muzaffarabad expressed serious concerns that the commissioning of Neelum Jhelum project would drastically reduce the flow of the Neelum river at Muzaffarabad.

In January 2018, it was reported that the retaining wall of the rock filled dam has got shifted by 18mm from its original position in Nov 2017 when the dam was loaded to design height of 1017 meter. The electricity generation from the dam may be delayed to June–July 2018.

In early March 2018, it was reported that the filling of water in the head race tunnel had started and the first unit would start electricity generation by the end of March, followed at one month intervals by the second, third and fourth units.

In April 2018, the first unit of 242.25 MW was commissioned at a levelised tariff of Rs 13.50 per unit.

The project attained its maximum generation capacity of 969 megawatts (MW) on 14 August 2018. On a few occasions it reached 1040 MW production, which is beyond its planned capacity.

In July 2022, the tail race tunnel of the dam cracked, collapsed and became blocked, leading to the shutdown of the power plant. It resumed power generation on August 9, 2023 after the completion of restoration works in the tail race tunnel. Repairs of 3.5km TRT cost the nation about Rs6bn, in addition to about Rs37bn in energy loss during repairs, maintenance, and testing over the following 20 months. WAPDA filed about Rs43bn insurance claims for the losses.

On April 3, 2024, electricity generation from the Neelum-Jhelum Hydel Power Station was restricted to 530 MW due to decrease in head race tunnel pressure. Electricity generation was then stopped on May 3, 2024 for the physical inspection of the head race tunnel to locate and fix the problem.

During the 2025 India–Pakistan conflict, Pakistan said that the dam had been damaged by Indian shelling.

=== Impact of India's Kishanganga Project ===
Location of the Neelum–Jhelum and Kishanganga projects in Kashmir

In 2007, India began construction of a run of the river power station on the Neelum River (called Kishanganga in India) upstream of the Neelum–Jhelum Dam. The Kishanganga Hydroelectric Project operates in a similar way to the Neelum–Jhelum, using a dam to divert a portion of the Neelum waters (58.4 m^{3}/s (2,062 cu ft/s)) to a power station before it is discharged into Bonar Nalla, another tributary of Jhelum. Pakistan estimated that, as a result of the Kishanganga project, it would experience a 21 percent reduction in the waters of Neelum in Pakistan, causing a 10 percent reduction in the power generated by Neelum–Jhelum.

In 2010, Pakistan raised a dispute under the Indus Waters Treaty, taking it to the Permanent Court of Arbitration. The court ruled that India was permitted to divert waters from one tributary to another for power generation, and it had priority as it started the Kishanganga project before Neelum–Jhelum. The Kishanganga project became operational on 19 May 2018.

== Corruption allegations ==
It is alleged that the procurement of TBM machines resulted in $74 million in kickbacks, according to Transparency International Pakistan.

== See also ==
- List of dams and reservoirs in Pakistan
- List of power stations in Pakistan
- Tarbela Dam
