= Mundair Kalan =

Darbar-e-Aliya Qadriya Mundair Syedan Sharif دربارِ عالیہ قادریہ منڈیر شریف سیّداں
- Shrine of a Sufi Mystic; Hazrat Mahboob-e-Zaat, Syed Ahmad Hussain Gilani & Hazrat Ghous e Zaman Syed Iftikhar Ahmad Hussain Gillani
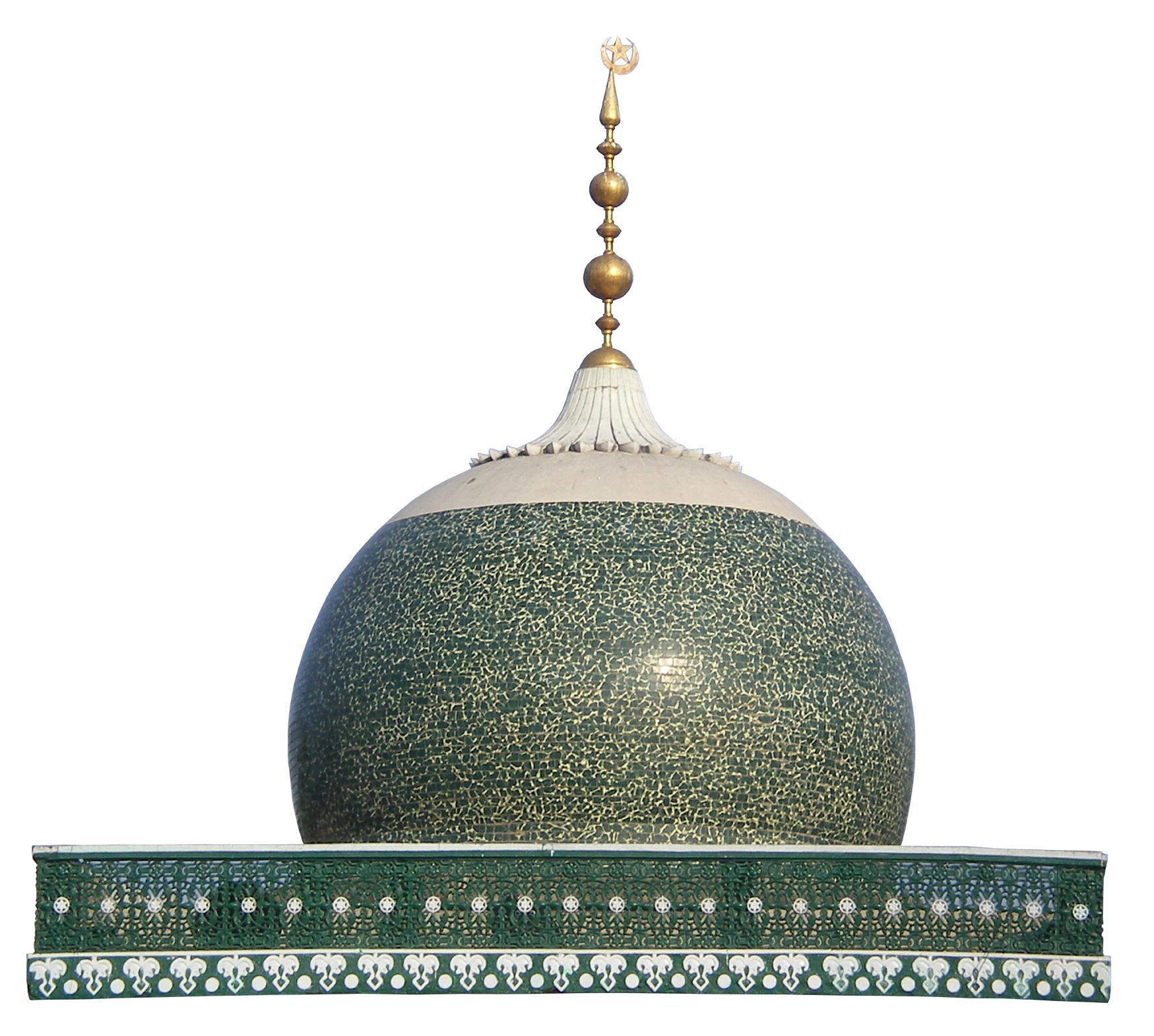
- Dome of the shrine of Hazrat Mahboob-e-Zaat

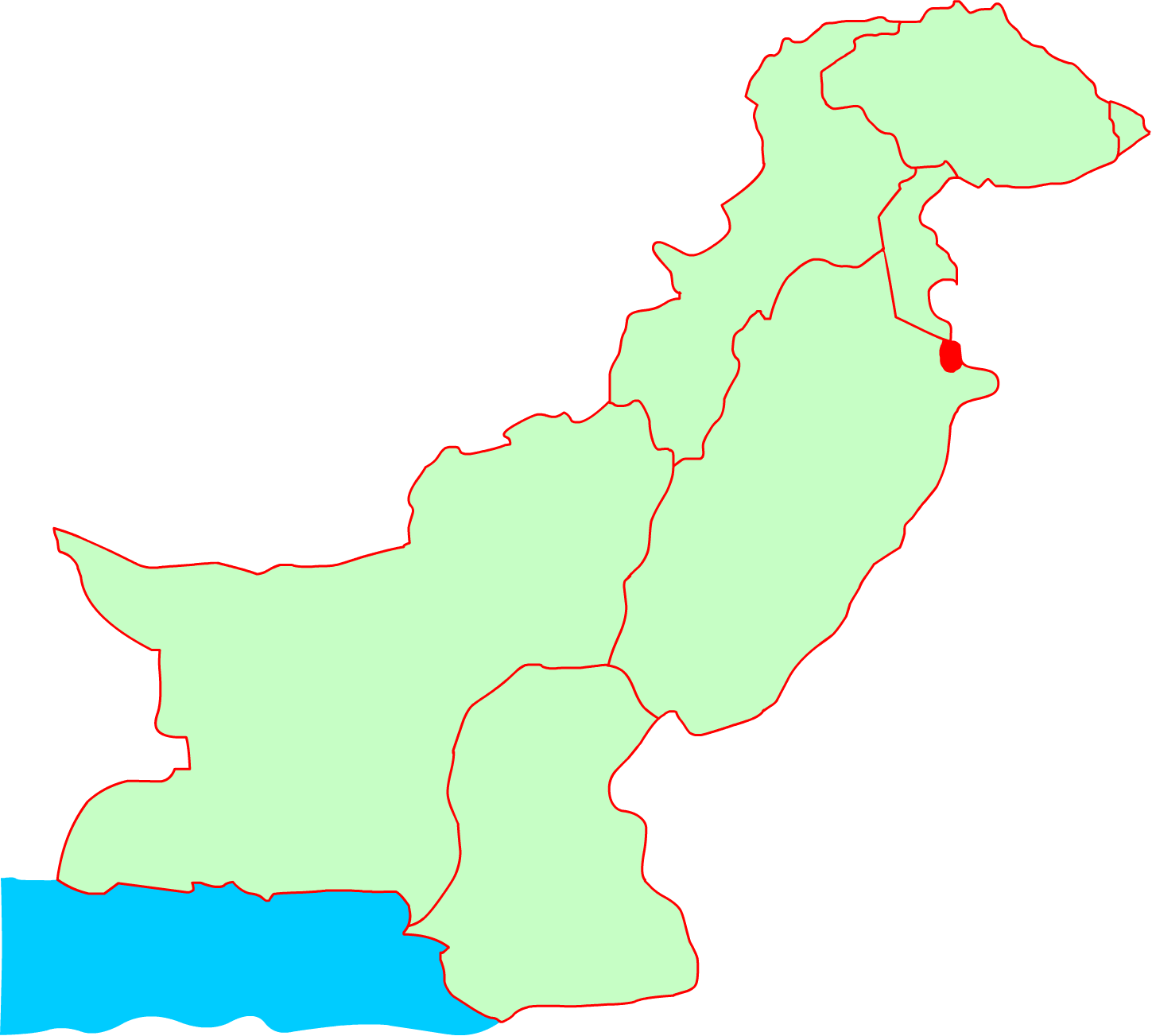
- Coordinates: 32°29′38.62″N 74°24′23.64″E
- Country: Pakistan
- Province: Punjab

Mundair Kalan, commonly known as Mundair Syeddan Sharif (Urdu: منڈیر شریف سیّداں)) is a village near Sahowala, between Ugoki and Sambrial in Sialkot District of the Punjab province of Pakistan. It is situated between two canals.
