= Kalekay Nagra =

كاليکے ناگرہ
- Kalekay Nagra
- Location within Pakistan
- Coordinates: 32°19′12.7698″N 74°29′29.3604″E
- Country: Pakistan
- Province: Punjab
- District: Sialkot
- Tehsil: Pasrur

Population (2014)
  - Total: 500
- Time zone: UTC+5 (PST)
- Calling code: 052

Kalekay Nagra (Urdu: كاليکے ناگرہ) is a suburban village with a population of around 500 in Tehsil Pasrur and District Sialkot of Punjab province of Pakistan. Administratively it is located in Union Council Adamkay Nagra. It is located at 32° 19' 12.6408 N 74° 29' 28.2804 E with an altitude of 238 metres (784 feet). The nearest big cities are Sialkot, Pasrur, Daska, Narowal and Gujranwala. Marala-Ravi Link Canal passes near it and used to cultivate its fertile land.

Ghazal singer Ghulam Ali was born in this village.
