= Sahowala =

Pakistani town

Sahowala سا ہووالہ
- Town
- Location in Pakistan
- Coordinates: 32°46′N 74°41′E
- Country: Pakistan
- Region: Punjab
- District: Sialkot
- Towns: 10

Government
  - Union Council Chairman: manzor Hussain warraich
  - Ex Secretary Union Council: Aamir Hussain

Area
  - Metro: 5 km^{2} (1.9 sq mi)
- Elevation: 242 m (794 ft)

Population 22,000
  - Town: 10
  - Density: 4,000/km^{2} (10,000/sq mi)
- Time zone: UTC+5 (PST)
  - Summer (DST): UTC+6 (PDT)
- PK: 51060 (Post Office)
- Area code: 052 (Landlines)

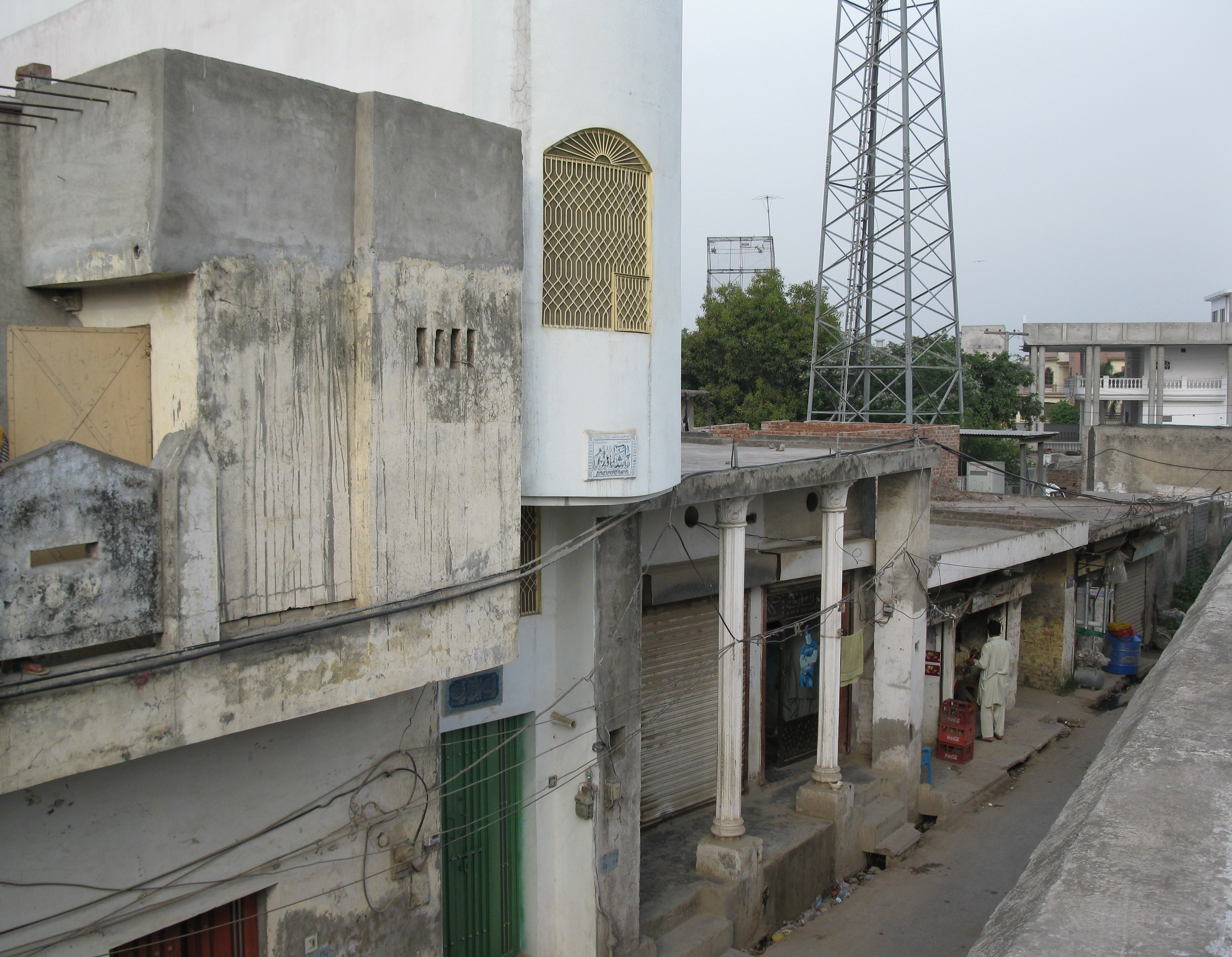
Shops in the town center

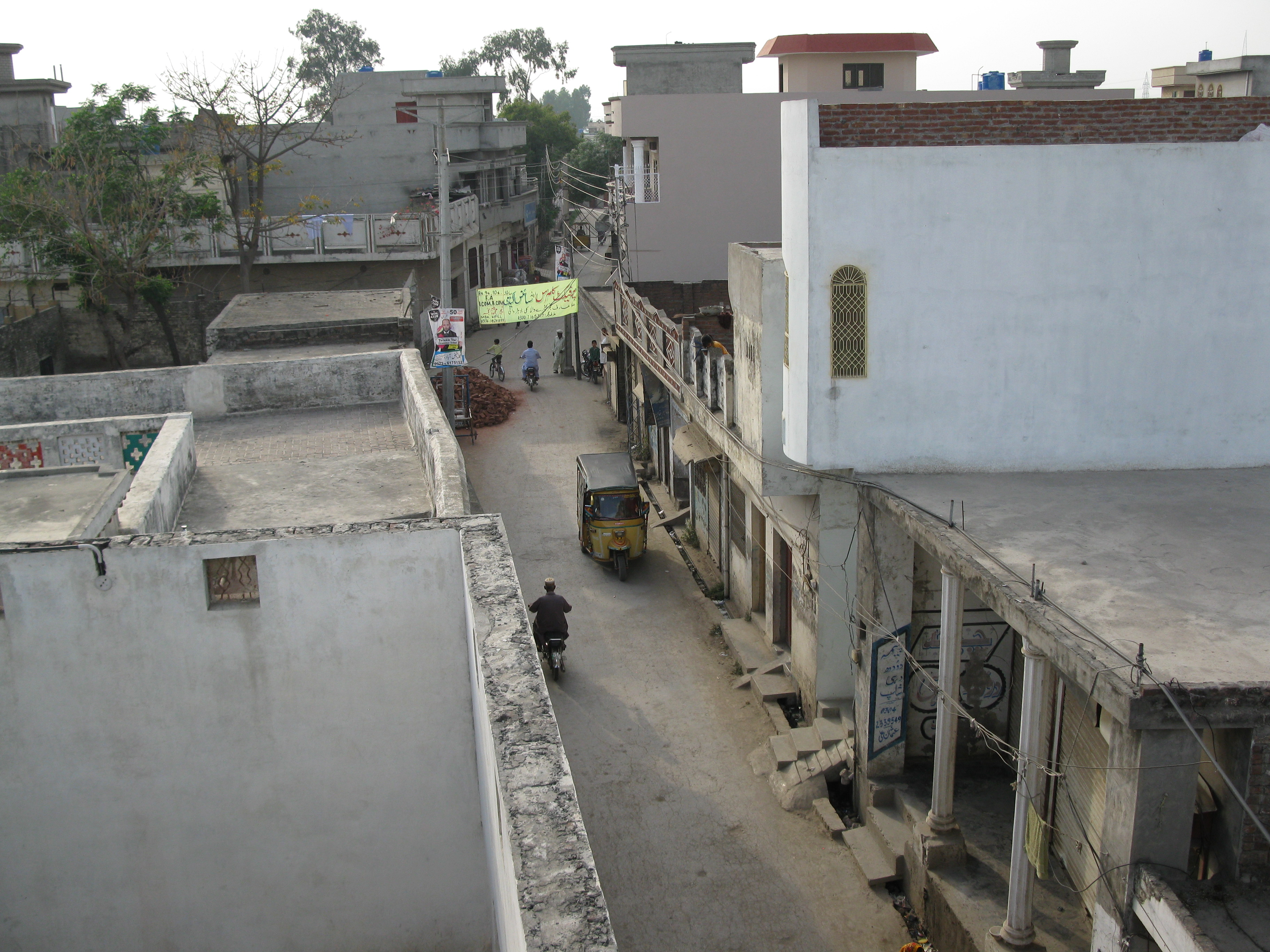
Shops in the town center

Sahowala is a town in Sambrial Tehsil, Sialkot District, Punjab, Pakistan. It lies between the Upper Chenab Canal and the Marala-Ravi Link Canal, both part of the Marala Headworks project.
