= Kishanganga Hydroelectric Project =

Kishanganga Dam
- Location within Jammu and Kashmir Location within India
- Coordinates: 34°38′56″N 74°45′05″E
- Status: Operational
- Construction began: 2007
- Opening date: 19 May 2018
- Construction cost: Rs. 5783.17 crore ($864 million USD 2016)
- Owner: NHPC Limited

Dam and spillways
- Type of dam: Concrete-face rock-fill
- Impounds: Kishanganga River
- Height: 37 m (121 ft)

Reservoir
- Total capacity: 18.35 million cubic metres (14,880 acre-feet)
- Active capacity: 7.5 million cubic metres (6,100 acre-feet)
- Inactive capacity: 10.8 million cubic metres (8,800 acre-feet)
- Maximum water depth: 30.48 m
- Normal elevation: 2,390 m msl

Kishanganga Hydroelectric Plant
- Coordinates: 34°28′21″N 74°38′06″E
- Operator: NHPC
- Commission date: 19 May 2018
- Type: Pelton
- Hydraulic head: 646 m (2,119 ft)
- Turbines: 3 x 110 MW Pelton-type
- Installed capacity: 330 MW
- Annual generation: 1,713 million kWh

The Kishanganga Hydroelectric Project is a run-of-the-river hydroelectric scheme in Jammu and Kashmir, India. Its dam diverts water from the Kishanganga River to a power plant in the Jhelum River basin. It is located near Dharmahama Village, 5 km (3 mi) north of Bandipore in the Kashmir Valley and has an installed capacity of 330 MW.

Construction on the project began in 2007 and was expected to be complete in 2016. It was halted in 2011 due to a dispute with Pakistan under the Indus Water Treaty, which went to a court of arbitration. Pakistan protested the effect of the project on the flow of the Kishanganga River to downstream areas in Pakistan-administered Kashmir. In December 2013, the Court ruled that India could divert water for power generation while ensuring a minimum flow of 9 cumecs (m^{3}/s) downstream to Pakistan.

All three units of 110 MW each were commissioned and synchronized with the electricity grid by 30 March 2018. On 19 May 2018, Indian Prime Minister Narendra Modi inaugurated the project.

== Design ==
Location of the Neelum–Jhelum and Kishanganga projects in Kashmir

The Kishanganga (Neelum) River is a major tributary of the west-flowing Jhelum River. Located to its north, the Kishanganga flows at a higher elevation than the Jhelum. Both the rivers originate in Indian-administered Kashmir and flow west into Pakistan-administered Kashmir, joining near Muzaffarabad. This situation presents a unique opportunity of diverting waters from the Kishenganga river into the Jhelum river through a tunnel and using the consequent flows to generate power. Both India and Pakistan have explored the possibility and came up with the Kishenganga project and the Neelum–Jhelum project respectively.

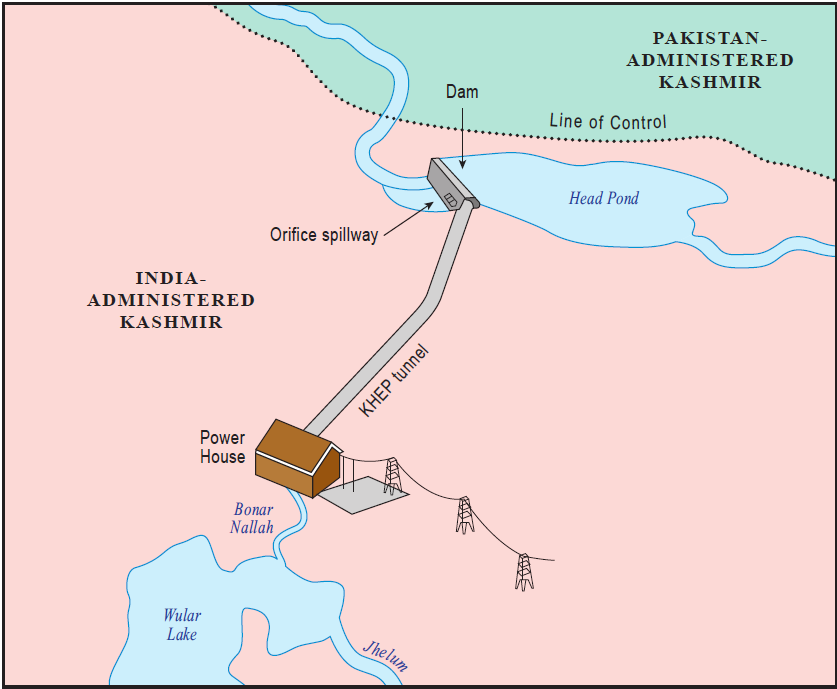
Project plan

The Kishanganga project includes a 37 m (121 ft) tall concrete-face rock-fill dam which diverts a portion (58.4 m3/sec) of the Kishanganga River south through a 23.20 km (14.4 mi) tunnel. The tunnel is received by a surge chamber before sending water to the underground power house which contains 3 x 110 MW Pelton turbine-generators. After the power plant, water is discharged through a tail race channel into Bonar Nallah, another tributary of Jhelum (at 34.473°N 74.635°E). After a short distance the Bonar Nallah drains into the Wular Lake, on the course of the Jhelum River. The drop in elevation from the dam to the power station provides a hydraulic head of 646 m (2,119 ft).

The dam is equipped with a lower level orifice spillway to transfer flood water as well as silt downstream to protect the power generation reliability and the operating life of the project. The arbitration award permitted the lower level orifice spillway as envisaged by India but prohibited the depletion of dead storage.

== Indus waters dispute ==
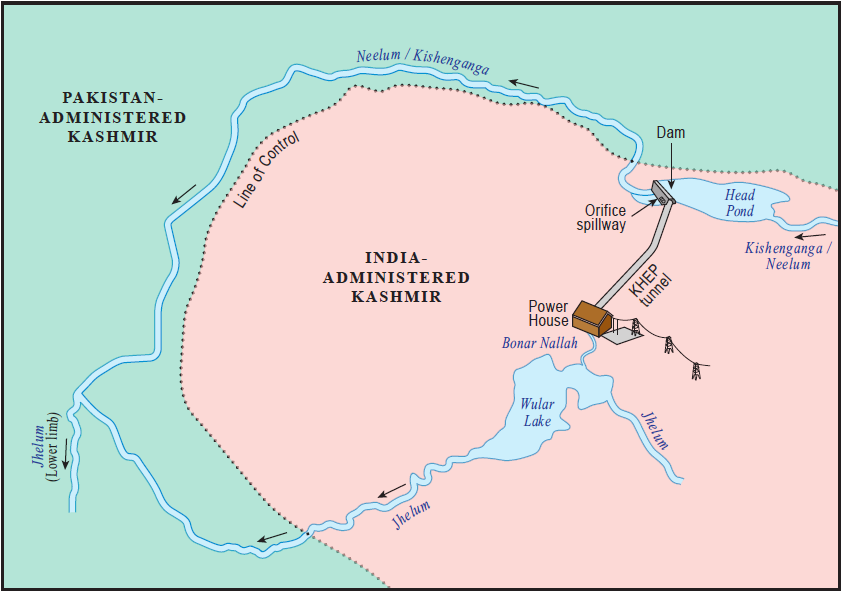
Kishenganga project in the context of India and Pakistan

The waters of the Jhelum river and its tributaries are allocated to Pakistan under the Indus Waters Treaty of 1960 (part of the three 'western rivers' – Indus, Jhelum and Chenab). However, India is allowed "non-consumptive" uses of the water such as power generation. Under the treaty, India is obliged to inform Pakistan of its intent to build a project six months prior to construction and take into account any concerns raised by the latter.

Pakistan strenuously objected to the project, claiming that India was not permitted under the Treaty to divert waters from one tributary to another. Experts have disagreed with this contention. John Briscoe, a former World Bank water expert, points out that the "far-sighted Indian and Pakistani engineers" who drafted the treaty very well anticipated the situation. The paragraph 15 of Annexure D states,

Where a Plant is located on a tributary of the Jhelum on which Pakistan has any agricultural use or hydroelectric use, the water released below the plant may be delivered, if necessary, into another tributary but only to the extent that the then existing agricultural use or hydroelectric use by Pakistan on the former tributary would not be adversely affected. (emphasis added)

Nevertheless, Pakistan maintained that the diversion of water was prohibited. Asif H. Kazi, an influential water professional, declared, "the treaty absolutely forbids India from undertaking their project".

Other than the legal objection, Pakistan also had concerns that the project would affect the flow of waters into Pakistan-administered Kashmir along the Kishanganga riverbed, impacting agriculture in "thousands of acres" as well as Pakistan's own planned Neelum–Jhelum hydropower project downstream. Experts estimated that the impact on the Neelum–Jhelum project would be only about 10 percent, because 70 percent of the waters of Kishanganga/Neelum are generated within Pakistan-administered Kashmir (downstream from the Kishanganga project) and the project itself reduces the flow by only 21 to 27 percent. (Note: When the Neelum–Jhelum project was completed in August 2018, it was reported that it was reported that it had attained its full generation capacity of 969 MW, and all units of the project were generating power to their maximum capacity.)

Unable to agree with India, Pakistan raised a 'dispute' under the Indus Waters Treaty, asking the World Bank to assemble a Court of Arbitration. This was the first time a Court of Arbitration (CoA) was assembled under the Indus Waters Treaty.

== Court of Arbitration # 1 ==
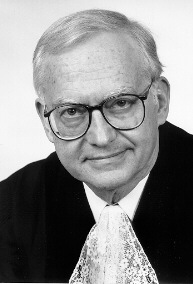
Judge Stephen Schwbel, chairman of the Court of Arbitration

A Court of Arbitration # 1 assembled under the Indus Water Treaty is expected to have seven members, two members each nominated by India and Pakistan, and three 'umpires' appointed by recognised authorities: the chairman appointed by the United Nations secretary-general and the World Bank president, a legal member/umpire appointed by US Chief Justice and Lord Chief Justice of England, an engineer member/umpire appointed by the President of MIT and the Rector of Imperial College, London. A distinguished panel was thus assembled to hear the case. (Note: The chairman of the panel was Judge Stephen Schwebel, former president of the International Court of Justice (ICJ). Frankin Berman and Howard S. Wheater were the legal and engineer members respectively. India nominated Lucius Catflisch and Judge Peter Tomka, president of ICJ. Pakistan nominated Jan Paulsson and Judge Bruno Simma.)

=== Permissibility of the Kishenganga project ===
The Court began by rejecting Pakistan's arguments that the Kishanganga project violated the provisions of the treaty. Then it considered whether the project satisfied the treaty's requirements for hydroelectric plants. Article III(2) obligates India to "let flow all the waters of Western Rivers" and "not permit any interference with the waters". Pakistan argued that the project violated Annexure D of the treaty in three respects:

- by the permanent diversion of waters from one tributary to another,
- by failure to conform to the requirements for a permitted run-of-the-river plant (by locating the plant along a diversion rather than at the dam site), and
- by a diversion of waters between two tributaries that was not "necessary".

The court rejected all three objections by analysing the treaty and its negotiating history.

The final question was whether the diversion met the requirement of protecting "the then existing agricultural use or hydro-electric use by Pakistan". The court addressed the issue with a sophisticated Vienna Convention analysis. It rejected Pakistan's "ambulatory" interpretation that all its future uses which might evolve over time were protected by the treaty, and upheld India's interpretation that only those uses existing when Pakistan was given complete information about the project were protected. The court determined that the Neelum–Jhelum project did not exist at the time the Kishenganga project "crystallized". Hence, it was not protected by the treaty provisions.

The court upheld India's right to proceed with the Kishanganga project. But it also concluded that the treaty and the customary international law required India to ensure a minimum environmental flow along the Kishanganga/Neelum riverbed. After requesting additional data from India and Pakistan to determine the requirements for minimum flow, the court determined this to be 12 cumecs at river crossing point into Pakistan. Balancing this figure against India's right to the satisfactory operation of its project, it set down 9 cumecs as the required minimum flow to be ensured at all times. The remaining 3 cumecs flow is met from the Indian territory downstream of the Kishangana dam. The loss of power generation is estimated as 5.7% of total generation in a year. However, CoA has not deliberated the possibility of reducing the loss by converting the excess dead storage above the gates as storage for proving the minimum environmental flow during the lean flow season.

=== Drawdown flushing ===
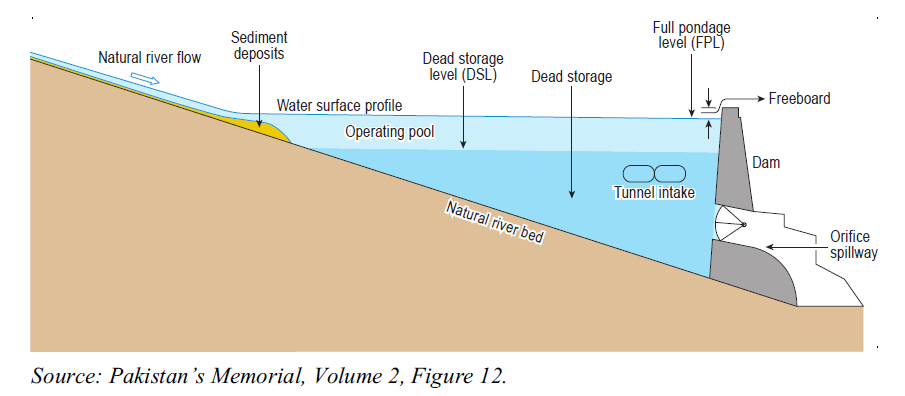
Schematic cross section of the dam and the reservoir

Pakistan also raised another dispute at the same Court of Arbitration, questioning India's plan to use drawdown flushing for clearing the sediments that accumulate below the 'dead storage' level. (Note: The 'dead storage' as defined in the IWT is the water storage in the dam's reservoir above the level of inlets, used for power generation, with adequate submergence to facilitate smooth water inflow. The storage above this level is called 'live storage'. While the live storage fluctuates, the dead storage stays in the reservoir and accumulates sediments that wash down from upstream if not able to pass downstream. The recommended international practice is to flush the dead storage periodically to clear the coarse sediments accumulated in the reservoir.)

Sedimentation is a serious problem among Himalayan rivers (since the Himalayas are young mountains). The previous Salal project on the Chenab river was constructed without drawdown flushing facility and the dam is said to have filled up with sediment within two seasons. For the Baglihar Dam, India insisted on the drawdown facility, leading Pakistan to raise a 'difference' under the Indus Water Treaty. It was referred to a neutral expert appointed by the World Bank, who ruled that the drawdown flushing facility was necessary. India depended on the precedent value of this ruling in designing the Kishanganga project.

Pakistan's concern with the drawdown facility is that it provides India with manipulable storage of water. If the water is drawn down then, while it is being refilled in the reservoir, the gates would be closed and the downstream areas would be starved of water. In the event of a war or conflict, India would have the ability to flood the downstream areas by using the drawdown facility and then shut off water while refilling the reservoir. So Pakistan perceived the drawdown facility as a key security issue. Indeed, the Indus Water Treaty stipulates that the water storage in the reservoir should be maintained above the dead storage level except in emergencies:

The Dead Storage shall not be depleted except in an unforeseen emergency. If so depleted, it will be re-filled in accordance with the conditions of its initial filling.

India argued that the ability to flush sediment was necessary to assure its right to generate hydroelectric power. The Court obtained technical evidence and expert opinion before determining that the drawdown flushing was not an absolute necessity. Other methods of sediment control were available even if they were less economical. The court read the treaty's provisions regarding depletion and the limits on live storage as restricting India's ability to manipulate flows. It might be convenient for India to practise sediment flushing, but it had to be balanced against Pakistan's water security. The court implied that the Baglihar neutral expert erred in not balancing the two concerns. It overruled the neutral expert's decision and ruled that drawdown flushing cannot be used in all future projects.

=== Prolonged issues ===
After the partial award of the Court of Arbitration (CoA) on 18 February 2013, India resumed the construction of the project. CoA in its decision/verdict dated 18 February 2013 unequivocally permitted India to construct the project as proposed by India without any modification after disposing off all the pending issues raised by Pakistan. The CoA decision categorically declared as quoted below (page no 201)

Even then Pakistan continued to raise other objections via the bilateral Indus Commission for publicity purposes. These were considered 'technical aspects' and India recommended the appointment of a neutral expert to resolve them. However, Pakistan insisted on assembling a second Court of Arbitration. India did not agree to the demand. The World Bank was faced with conflicting demands from the two parties and called for a "pause" in December 2016 asking India and Pakistan to agree on a course of action. There was no further movement afterward till the completion of the Kishenganga project.

According to Feisal Naqvi, former counsel for the Government of Pakistan, Pakistan's concern was that India did not alter the design of the Kishenganga dam in the light of the court's determination. While the court's ruling prohibited drawdown flushing, the low-level orifice outlets that would enable such flushing still remain. A neutral expert decision to declare them "illegal" would have been necessary for Pakistan.

India never agreed that the low-level orifice outlets were purely meant for drawdown flushing. As acknowledged by the CoA (paras 507 to 509), the low-level orifice outlets, as permitted by Annexure D (8d) of the Treaty, are also needed to pass the probable maximum flood, to release water in the event of an unforeseen emergency and for sediment control by sluicing without depleting the dead storage. It is stated in the court's proceedings that they would be useful for sediment control generally, even without drawdown flushing. (Note: The Indian Central Water Commission's guidelines state: "These sluices can be used for undertaking a number of hydraulic sediment evacuation techniques viz; drawdown flushing, sluicing, density venting, etc.")

== Court of Arbitration # 2 ==
The second Court of Arbitration (CoA#2), regarding the differences raised by Pakistan on Kishanganga and Ratle hydroelectric projects, delivered its award on 8 August 2025. CoA#2 made it clear that, while interpreting Annexure D 8(d) of IWT that outlets such as orifice spillways, fish ladder gates, etc. can be installed above the dead storage level without any restriction to pass the probable maximum flood or for sedimentation control or any other purpose. However, these outlets are permitted fully or partially below the dead storage level when all other equally effective options are not found adequate. It was clarified that the outlets considered in Annexure D 8d are entirely different from the crest gated spillways (including chute spillway) or turbine intakes dealt in Annexure D 8e or 8f respectively though the functions may overlap. With this interpretation of CoA#2, it is possible to route the probable maximum flood by installing orifice spillways in place of overflowing spillway or crest gated spillway without utilizing Annexure D 8e provision.

== Project details ==
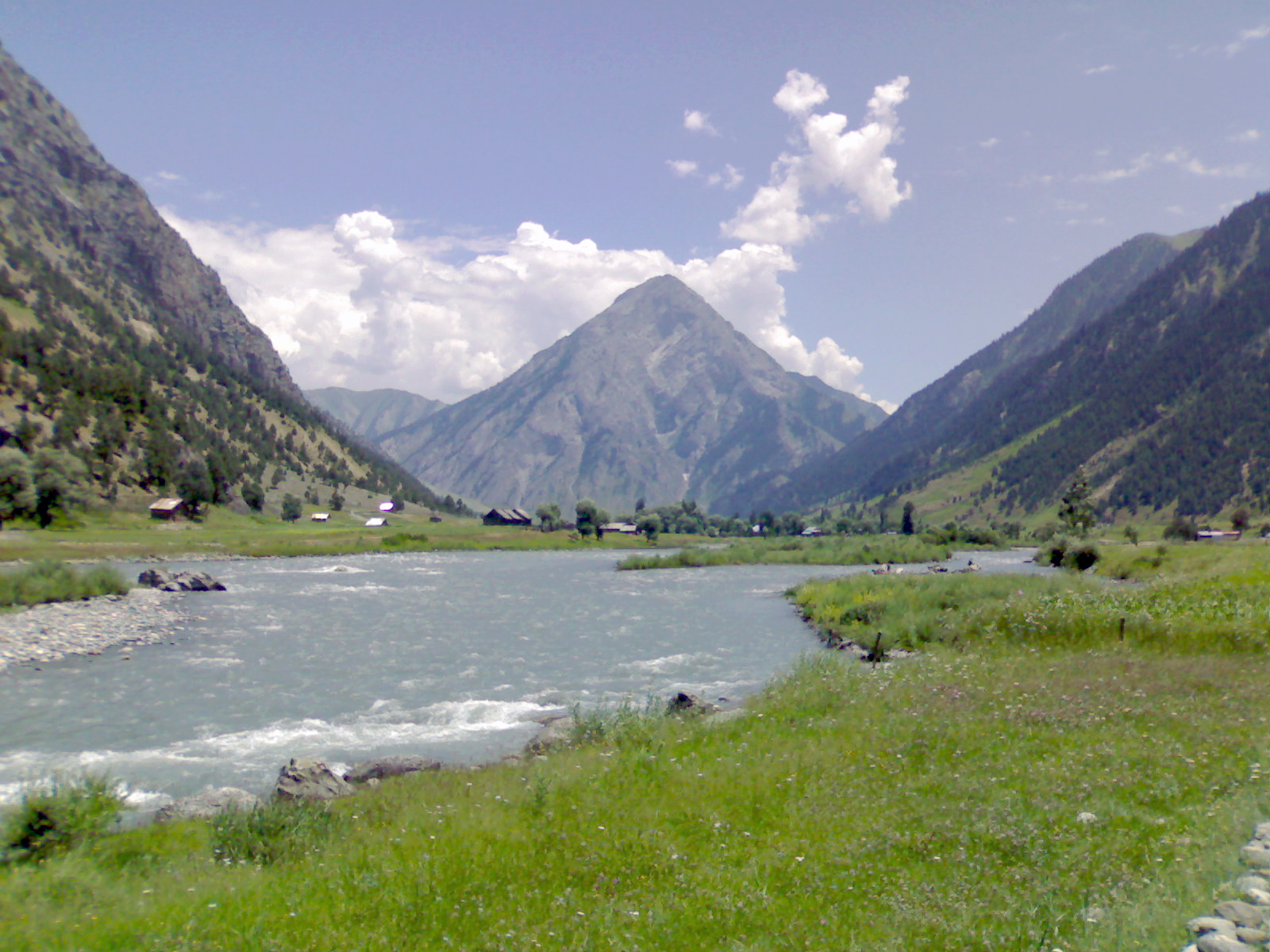
Kishenganga River near Habba Khatoon

=== Construction ===
The survey work for the Kishanganga project was undertaken prior to 1988. In that year, the Pakistan's Indus Commissioner became aware of the survey and asked India to pause work. In 1994, India informed Pakistan its plans for a project with a storage capacity of 0.14 MAF. After receiving Pakistan's objections, it revised the project from a storage project to a run-of-the-river project.

During the period 2004–2006, the project moved forward, having been taken up by National Hydroelectric Power Corporation (NHPC Limited). The construction of the tunnels was carried out by Hindustan Construction Company jointly with UK-based Halcrow Group. The first 14.75 km of the tunnel was constructed using a tunnel boring machine operated by SELI, and the remaining 8.9 km by the conventional drill and blast method. It is one of the longest headrace tunnels in India with overburden (height of the mountain above the tunnel) of 1470 metres. Using tunnel boring in the young Himalayan mountains and the adverse climate in winters posed considerable challenges to the construction team.

=== Commissioning ===
Indian Prime Minister Narendra Modi inaugurated the Kishanganga power plant in the state of Jammu and Kashmir on 19 May 2018. The 330MW Kishanganga hydropower station, work on which started in 2009, is one of the projects that India has fast-tracked in the volatile state amid frosty ties between the nuclear-armed countries. "This region can not only become self-sufficient in power but also produce for other regions of the country," Modi said in the state's capital, Srinagar. "Keeping that in mind we have been working on various projects here for the past four years." Pakistan has opposed some of these projects, saying they violate a World Bank-mediated treaty on the sharing of the Indus River and its tributaries upon which 80 percent of its irrigated agriculture depends.

=== Benefits ===
In addition to generating 330 MW power, the diverted water from the Kishanganga River is used for the purpose of irrigation or to generate additional electricity from the downstream Lower Jhelum (105 MW), Uri (720 MW) and proposed Kohala (1124 MW) (in Pakistan-administered Kashmir) hydel projects located on the Jhelum River.

== Future development ==
It was stipulated by the CoA that India shall release nine cumecs subject to adequate inflows in the reservoir for the purpose of minimum environmental flows into the Kishanganga River. Though, there is no stipulation per IWT to maintain minimum environmental flows for a run of the river hydropower plant and India offered voluntarily to release the minimum environmental flows downstream without contesting the environmental flow requirement. CoA stipulated the same as the requirement under Customary international law. The CoA verdict (page 43) also made provision to contest the minimum environmental flow requirement in future after seven years from the commissioning of the Kishenganga power plant. As per clause 1 of Annexure D of the treaty, India can use the available water fully for hydropower generation in an unrestricted manner subject to complying with the restrictions imposed in Annexure D. There is no stipulation in Annexure D for sparing water to the downstream for the purpose of minimum environmental flows. As per clause 29 of Annexure G, whenever the relevant treaty stipulations are not extant then only other acceptable international laws such as customary international law are applicable. Thus CoA has provided an option to rectify omissions of India in the future so that the Kishenganga power project becomes economically viable as the stipulated minimum environmental flows are nearly 25% of the total inflows.

In the case of storage works, Annexure E(20) of IWT clearly permits that the stored water can be used fully in any manner by India without the need to release water downstream for minimum environmental flows. The average water yield is 4.1 cumecs (129 million cubic meters per year) in the river catchment area below the Kishanganga dam before the river enters Pakistan as stated in page 171 of the CoA decision dated 18 February 2013. Downstream of the Kishanganga dam, the river is taking a U-turn to enter Pakistan territory. Nearly 20 million cubic meters capacity gross storage dam can be envisaged close to the LoC to impound all the inflows which can be further pumped through a 6 km long tunnel into the upstream Kishenganga dam reservoir. The augmented water into the Kishanganga dam reservoir is also diverted to the Jhelum River to generate additional power by the 330 MW power plant. As the pumping head (90 m) is not exceeding 15% of the 664 m head available for power generation, the storage reservoir with a pumping facility is highly economical to utilize all the waters of the Kishenganga River flowing in India. Water pumping from the storage works/reservoir could be achieved by installing a pumped storage scheme to generate peaking and secondary power additionally.

== Concerns ==
During the construction following concerns were raised. In 2013 local population of Bandipora protested against Hindustan Construction Company (HCC) executing the 330 MW Kishenganga hydroelectric project in the area. The protesters accused the company of causing severe damage to natural environment and causing perilous pollution in the area. Following sustained protests by villagers in 2012 and 2013, the hydrology department of National Institute of Technology (NIT) conducted tests in the area and stated pollution had caused chemical disturbance in the water around the project site.The tests revealed high concentration of dissolved solids and unsafe alkaline levels in the water. “The polluted water can neither be used for the human consumption nor for washing purposes,” the report cautioned

== Current status ==
- 2025 May: After suspending IWT, India has decided to significantly increase the capacity of the Kishanganga Project beyond its initial plans [of 330 MW].

== See also ==
- Ratle Hydroelectric Plant
- Baglihar Dam
- Salal Hydroelectric Power Station
- Neelum–Jhelum Hydropower Plant
- Rivers of Jammu and Kashmir

== Bibliography ==
- Reports of International Arbitral Awards, Volume XXXI (pp.1–358) (PDF), United Nations, 2018
  - Order on the Interim Measures Application of Pakistan dated June 6, 2011 (pp. 6–53)
  - Partial Award (pp. 55–245)
  - Decision on India's Request for Clarification or Interpretation Dated 20 May 2013 (pp. 295–307)
  - Final Award (pp. 309–358)
- Akhter, Majed (11 May 2013), "Geopolitics of Dam Design on the Indus", Economic and Political Weekly, 48 (19): 24–26, JSTOR 23527337
- Briscoe, John (11–17 December 2010), "Troubled Waters: Can a Bridge Be Built over the Indus?", Economic and Political Weekly, 45 (50): 28–32, 35, JSTOR 25764211
- Crook, John R. (April 2014), "In re Indus Waters Kishenganga Arbitration (Pakistan v. India)", The American Journal of International Law, 108 (2): 308–314, doi:10.5305/amerjintelaw.108.2.0308, JSTOR 10.5305/amerjintelaw.108.2.0308, S2CID 147011615
- Khan, Muhammad Rashid (January–June 2013), "Crucial Water Issues between Pakistan and India, CBMs, and the Role of Media" (PDF), South Asian Studies, 28 (1), Punjab University: 213–221
- Li, Yanying; Ng, Camille M. (2014), "Inter-State and Investor-State Arbitrations at the PCA", Hague Yearbook of International Law / Annuaire de La Haye de Droit International, Vol. 26 (2013), BRILL, pp. 502–, ISBN 978-90-04-28736-5
- Tanaka, Yoshifumi (2012), "Note on the Interim Measures in the Indus Waters Kishenganga Arbitration", The Law & Practice of International Courts and Tribunals, 11 (3): 555–579, doi:10.1163/15718034-12341240
- Upadhyay, Aardraa; Chatterjee, Tamojit (2013), "The Kishenganga Hydro-Electric Project Arbitration Dispute - Partial Award (Pakistan v. India): An Analysis", Indian J. Arb. L., 190 – via Hein Online
