= Jyotipuram =

- town
- Location in Jammu and Kashmir, India Jyotipuram (India)
- Coordinates: 33.1111°N 74.84287°E
- Country: India
- Union Territory: Jammu and Kashmir
- District: Reasi
- Elevation: 750 m (2,460 ft)

Languages
  - Official: Dogri, Hindi, Urdu, Kashmiri, English
  - Other: Pahari, Gojri
- Time zone: UTC+5:30 (IST)

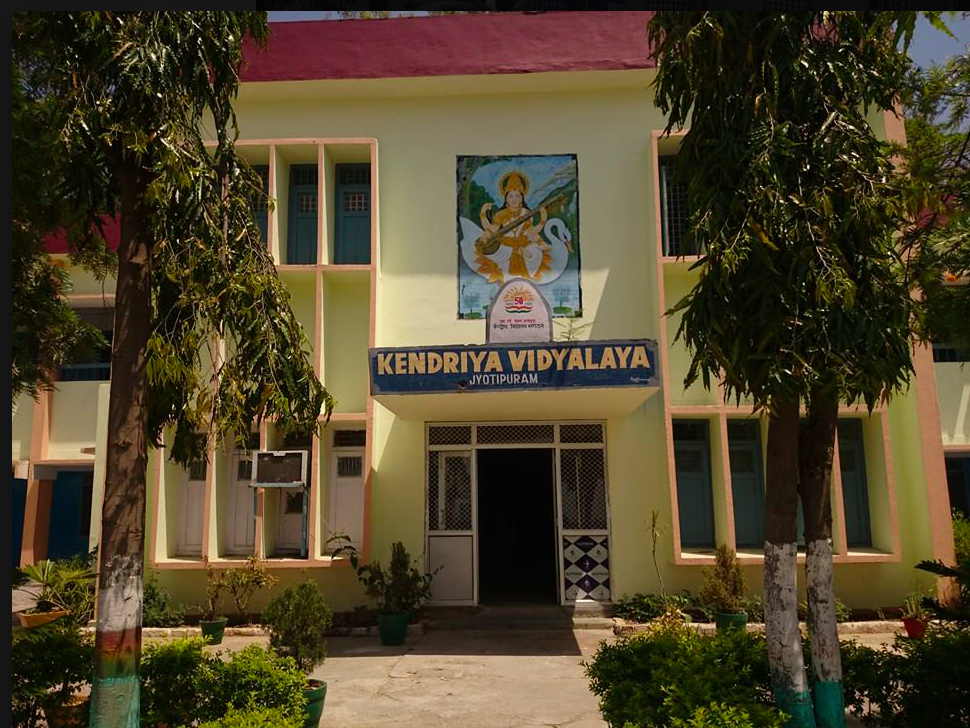
KV No.1 Jyotipuram, Jammu & Kashmir

Jyotipuram is a small town in the Reasi district of Indian union territory Jammu and Kashmir. NHPC with the vision of Government of India constructed a Hydel Power Project known as Salal Hydroelectric Power Station which is approximately 10 km from Jyotipuram. The place has Kendriya Vidyalaya (Central School). Jyotipuram was the township developed as the residential place for the officers and staff engaged in the construction of the Hydel project on river Chenab. The project was undertaken by NHPC.

The town has all the modern facilities like a hospital, playground, etc. The town is surrounded by mountains. The town is situated on a hill. It is guarded by Central Industrial Security Force (CISF). Known all over as model town, Jyotipuram has all facilities like uninterrupted power and water supply.
