= Baglihar Dam =

Dam on the Chenab river in India

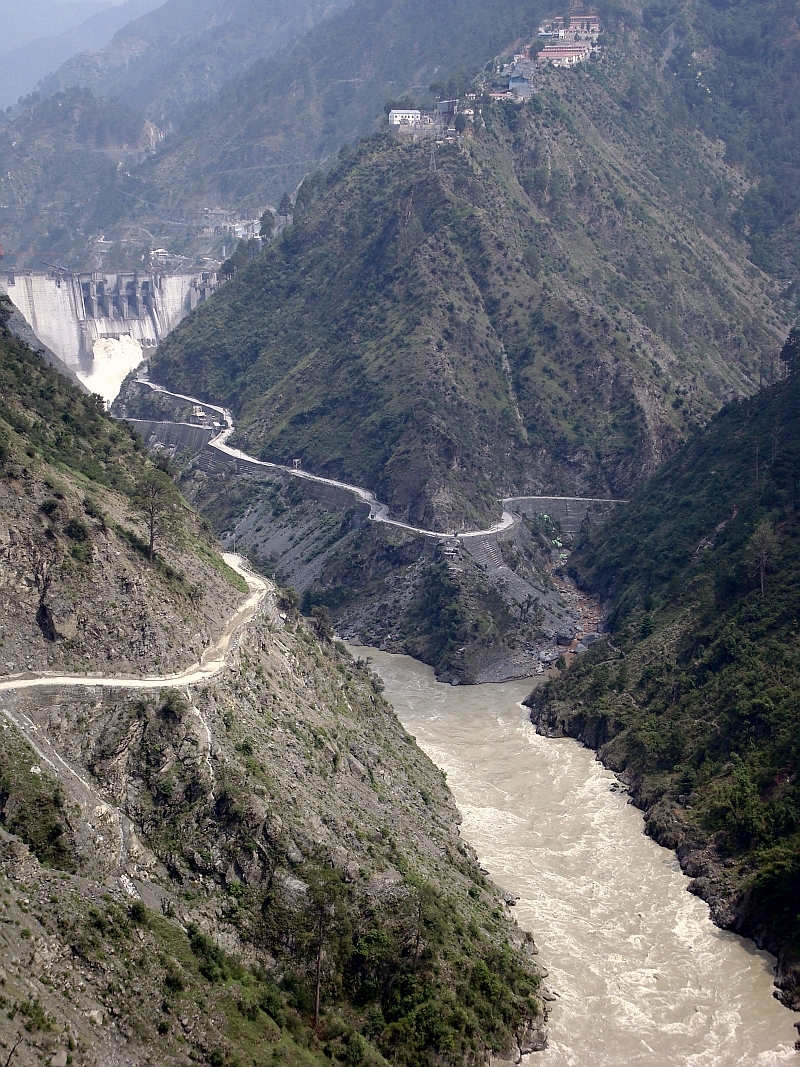

- Location of Baglihar Dam in Ramban district, Jammu and Kashmir, India Baglihar Dam (India)
- Country: India
- Location: Baglihar road, Ramban district, Jammu and Kashmir, India
- Coordinates: 33°09′43″N 75°19′40″E
- Construction began: 1999
- Opening date: 2008

Dam and spillways
- Type of dam: Gravity
- Impounds: Chenab River
- Height: 143 m (469 ft)
- Length: 317 m (1,040 ft)
- Elevation at crest: 843 m (2,766 ft)
- Dam volume: 1,800,000 m^{3} (63,566,400 ft^{3})
- Spillway type: Chute type
- Spillway capacity: 16,500 m^{3}/s (582,692 cu ft/s)

Reservoir
- Total capacity: 395,950,000 m^{3} (321,002 acre⋅ft)
- Active capacity: 32,560,000 m^{3} (26,397 acre⋅ft) above 836 m msl
- Surface area: 8,079,000 m^{2} (1,996 acres)
- Normal elevation: 840 m msl (FRL or full pond level)

Power Station
- Commission date: Stage I: 2008-09; Stage II: 2015-16
- Hydraulic head: 130 m (427 ft) (gross)
- Turbines: Stage I: 3 x 150 MW Francis-type; Stage II: 3 x 150 MW Francis-type
- Installed capacity: Stage I: 450 MW; Stage II: 450 MW; Total: 900 MW

Baglihar Dam (Hindi: बगलिहार बाँध Baglihār Bāndh), also known as Baglihar Hydroelectric Power Project, is a run-of-the-river power project on the Chenab River in Baglihar road in the Ramban district of Jammu and Kashmir, India. It is located 50 km from Ramban town.

The first power project executed by the Jammu and Kashmir Power Development Corporation, it was conceived in 1992 and approved in 1996, with construction begun in 1999. The project was estimated to cost US$1 billion. The project consists of two-stage of 450MW each. The first stage of the project was completed in 2008-09 and the second stage of the project was completed in 2015–16.

== Desilting the Dam ==
Baglihar Dam is fully operational.

When Salal Dam was constructed on Chenab River in 1980s after Pakistan had finally agreed in 1978 to allow the construction, the six under-sluices that were provided during the construction had to be plugged permanently before the dam could be operated because Pakistan had vetoed on desilting the dam claiming that it violated the Indus Water Treaty. However, no such prohibition was agreed by India for Baglihar dam that was constructed twenty years later. Chenab river carries high quantity of silt. Its annual silt load is estimated to be 32,000,000 m^{3} (26,000 acre⋅ft). The silt accumulation elevates the river bed, reduces the reserviour capacity, reduces power generation and damages turbines.

Regular drawdown flushing (de-silting) is being done in Baglihar dam. After the Indus Water Treaty was suspended in April 2025, India does not inform Pakistan when the desilting operation is done.

== Indus waters dispute ==
After construction began in 1999, Pakistan objected that the design parameters of the Baglihar project violated the Indus Water Treaty of 1960. The treaty provides for India to make use of the three western rivers of the Indus River system, including Chenab River, in constrained ways. India can only establish run-of-the-river power projects with limited reservoir capacity and limited control over flows needed for feasible power generation. Availing this provision, India planned for several run-of-the-river projects, with Pakistan objecting to them. In the case of the Baglihar and Kishanganga Hydroelectric Plants, Pakistan claimed that some design parameters were too lax. It claimed that they were not needed for feasible power generation but for gaining an excessive ability to accelerate, decelerate or block the flow of the water, thus giving India a strategic leverage in times of political tension or war.

During 1999-2004 India and Pakistan held several rounds of talks on the design of the project, but could not reach an agreement. After the failure of talks on 18 January 2005, Pakistan raised six objections to the World Bank, a broker and signatory of Indus Water Treaty. In April 2005 the World Bank determined the Pakistani claim as a ‘Difference’, a classification that is in-between the less serious ‘Question’ and the more serious ‘Dispute’. In May 2005, it appointed Professor Raymond Lafitte, a Swiss civil engineer as a neutral expert to adjudicate the difference.

Lafitte declared his final verdict on 12 February 2007, in which he upheld some minor objections of Pakistan, requiring that pondage capacity be reduced by 13.5%, the height of dam be reduced by 1.5 meters, and power intake tunnels be raised by 3 meters, thereby limiting some flow control capabilities of the earlier design. However, he rejected Pakistani objections on height and gated control of the spillway, declaring that these features conformed to the engineering norms of the day. Pakistan government expressed its disappointment at the outcome.

The verdict acknowledged India's right to construct 'gated spillways' under the Indus Waters Treaty. The report allowed pondage of 32.56 million cubic meters against India's demand for 37.5 million cubic metres. The report also recommended reducing the height of freeboard from 1.5 m to nil and surcharge storage unchanged at 3 m. The verdict permitted drawdown flushing to prevent silt accumulation in the reservoir which has enhanced the life of the reservoir to above 80 years. Without drawdown flushing, the reservoir would have been completely silted in 13 years period by 2017.

On 1 June 2010, India and Pakistan had a meeting of the Permanent Indus Commission, where they resolved the issue relating to the initial filling of Baglihar dam. According to PTI, "the two sides discussed the issue at length without any prejudice to each other's stand...Indian and Pakistani teams resolved the issue relating to the initial filling of Baglihar dam after discussions." Pakistan also agreed not to raise the issue further.

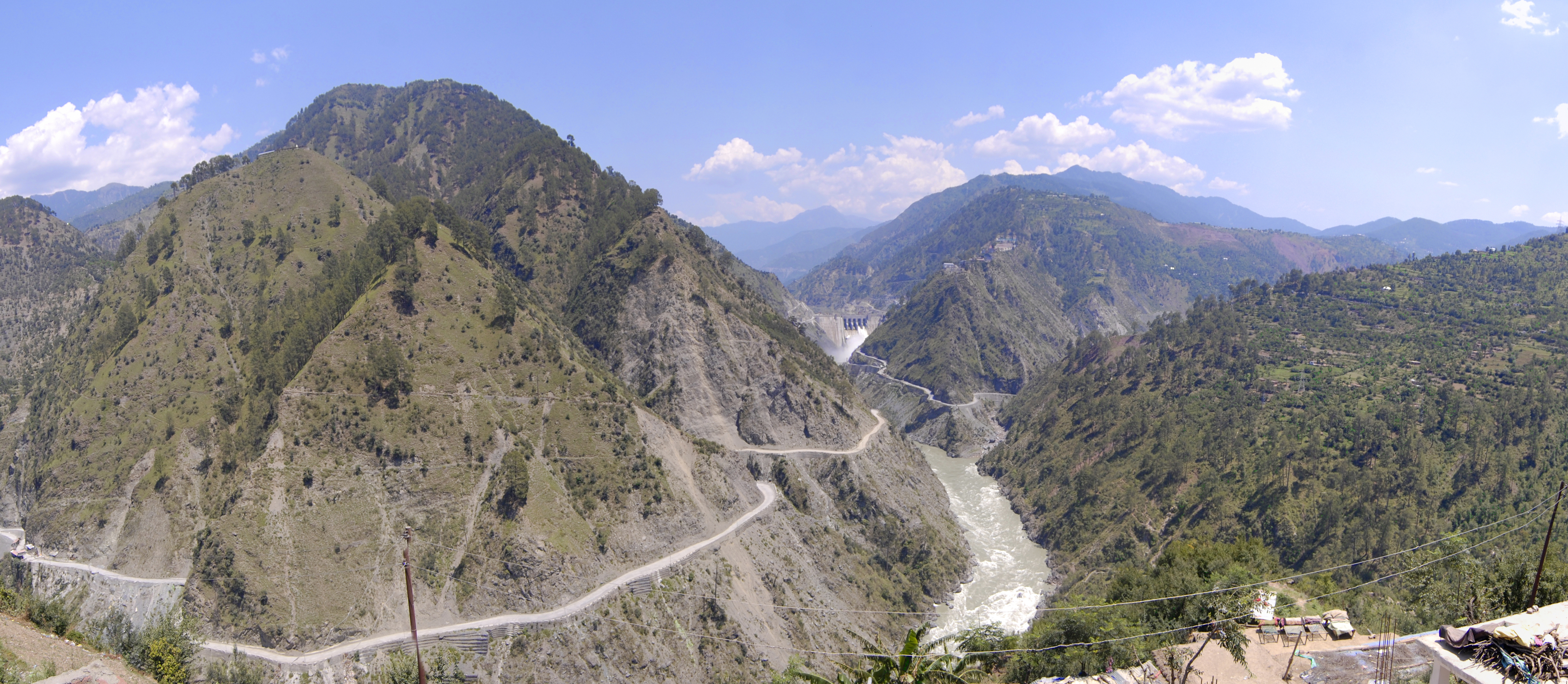
Panorama of Baglihar Dam

== See also ==
- Ratle Hydroelectric Plant – under construction upstream
- Kishanganga Hydroelectric Plant
- Salal Hydroelectric Power Station
- Rivers of Jammu and Kashmir

== Bibliography ==
- Bakshi, Gitanjali; Trivedi, Sahiba (2011), The Indus Equation (PDF), Strategic Foresight Group
- Gazdar, Haris (26 February 2005), "Baglihar and Politics of Water: A Historical Perspective from Pakistan", Economic and Political Weekly, 40 (9): 813–817, JSTOR 4416263
- Salman, Salman M. A. (2008). "The Baglihar difference and its resolution process - a triumph for the Indus Waters Treaty?". Water Policy. 10 (2): 105–117. doi:10.2166/wp.2008.060b.}
- Sinha, Rajesh (18 February 2006), "Two Neighbours and a Treaty: Baglihar Project in Hot Waters", Economic and Political Weekly, 41 (7): 606–608, JSTOR 4417834
- Vishvanathan, N. (2000), "Silt Disposal from Reservoirs", in C.V.J. Varma; B.S.K. Naidu; A.R.G. Rao (eds.), Silting Problems in Hydro Power Plants: Proceedings of the First International Conference, New Delhi, India, 13-15th October 1999, CRC Press, ISBN 978-90-5410-799-6
- Wirsing, Robert G.; Jasparro, Christopher (May 2006), Spotlight on Indus River Diplomacy: India, Pakistan, and the Baglihar Dam Dispute (PDF), Asia-Pacific Center for Security Studies, archived (PDF) from the original on 23 March 2020
