= Marala–Ravi Link Canal =

Canal in Punjab, Pakistan

Marala–Ravi Link Canal (MRL)

The Marala–Ravi Link Canal (MRL canal) is a canal in Pakistani Punjab that flows from the Marala Headworks on the Chenab River near Sialkot to the Ravi River. It was constructed in 1956 to transfer water from the Chenab to Ravi as well as to irrigate about 60,000 hectares of land in the Sialkot and Gujranwala districts. It is 100 kilometres (62 mi) long and has a capacity of 22,000 cubic feet per second (620 m^{3}/s).

The banks of the canal have no fencing and are in dilapidated condition as they have not been repaired since its construction in 1954. The banks were breached in 2014 floods.

During the Indo-Pakistani War of 1965, the Indian forces strategised to reach up to the MRL canal, driving a wedge between Sialkot and Lahore. But, the Pakistani forces fought them off, resulting in a stalemate.

During initial filling of Baglihar Dam in 2008, the canal was closed allegedly due to the non-availability of water in Chenab. Indian commentators dispute the claim.

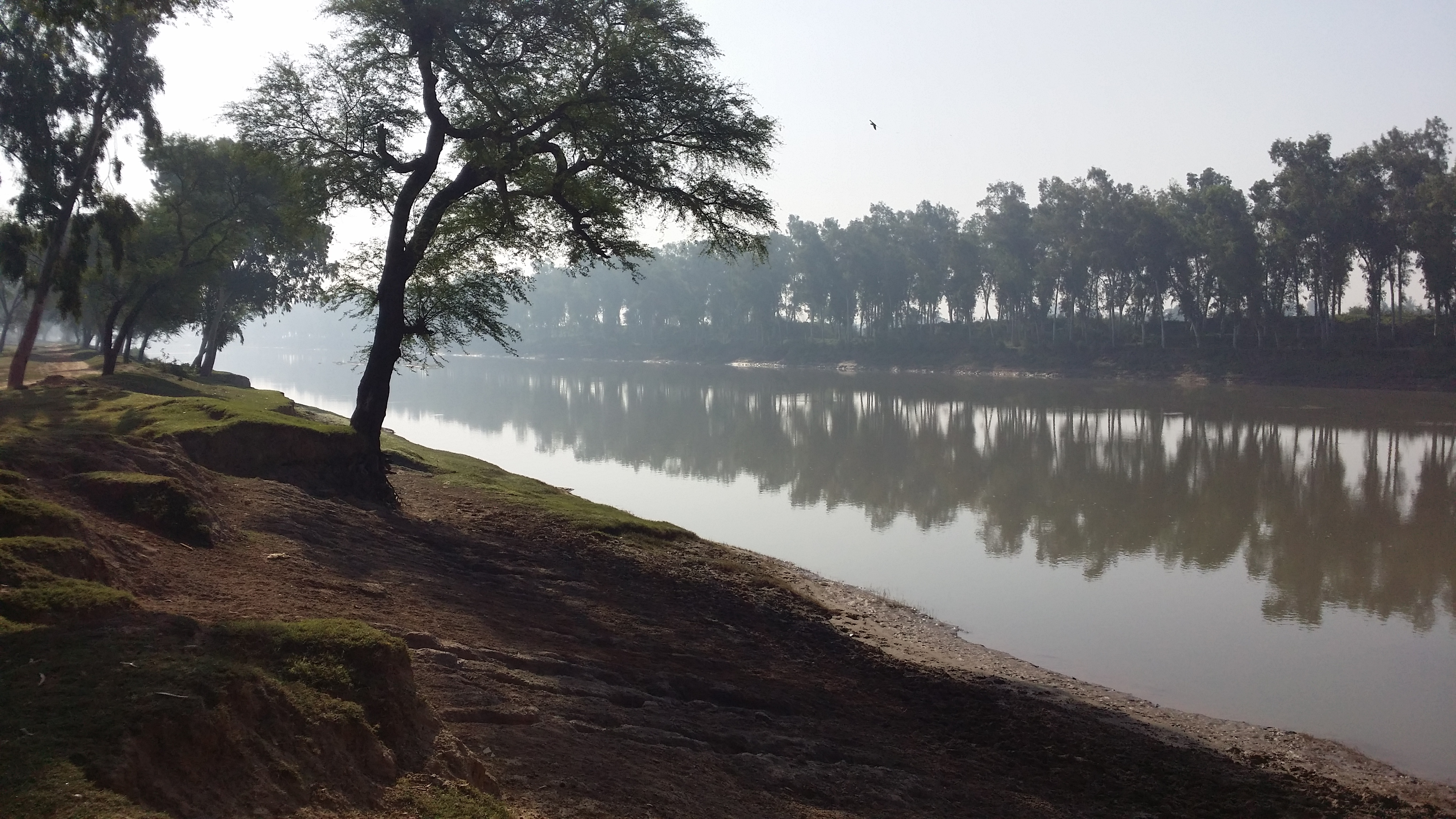
Views of the canal near Kalekay Nagra village

Views of the canal near Kalekay Nagra village

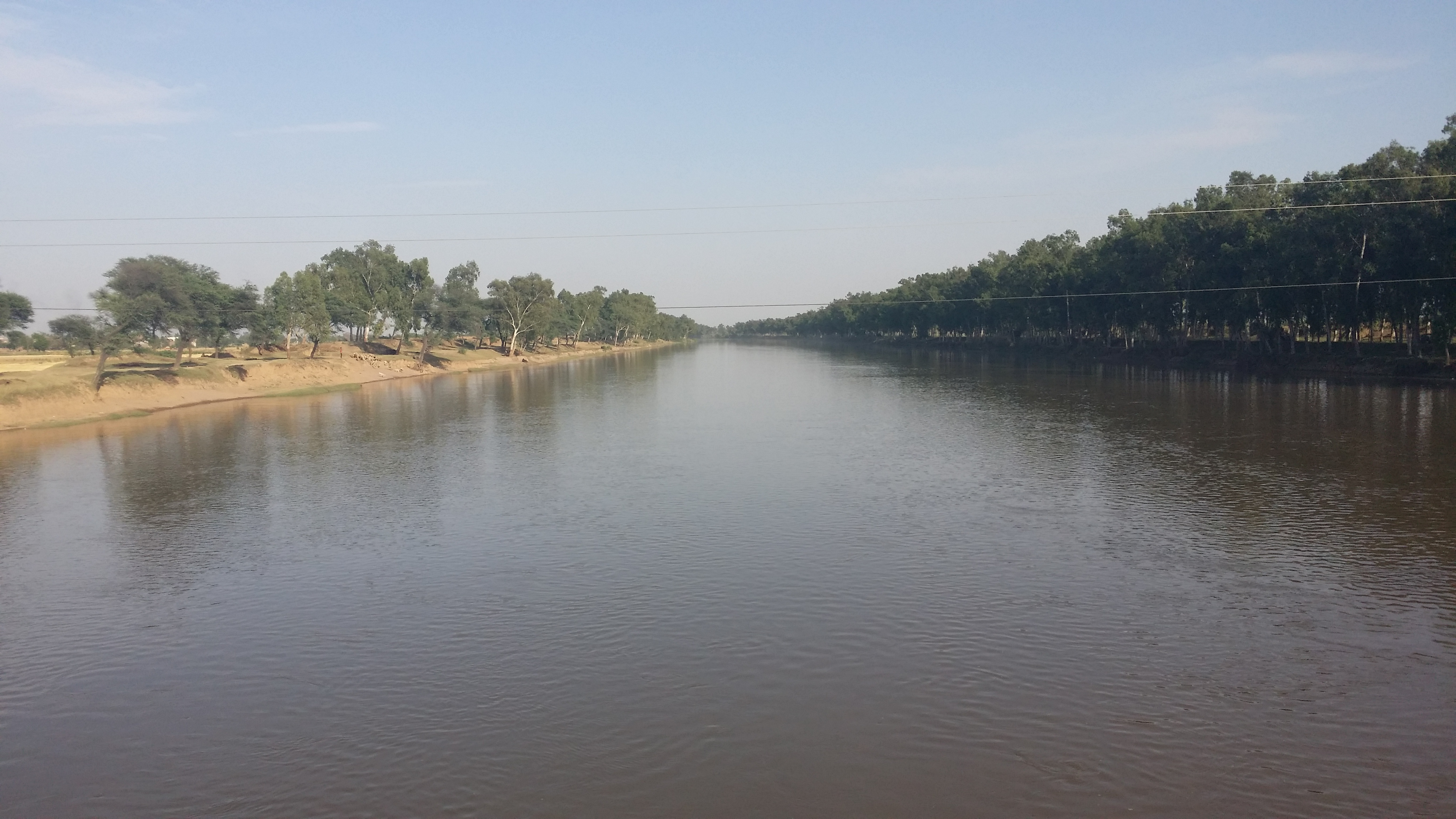

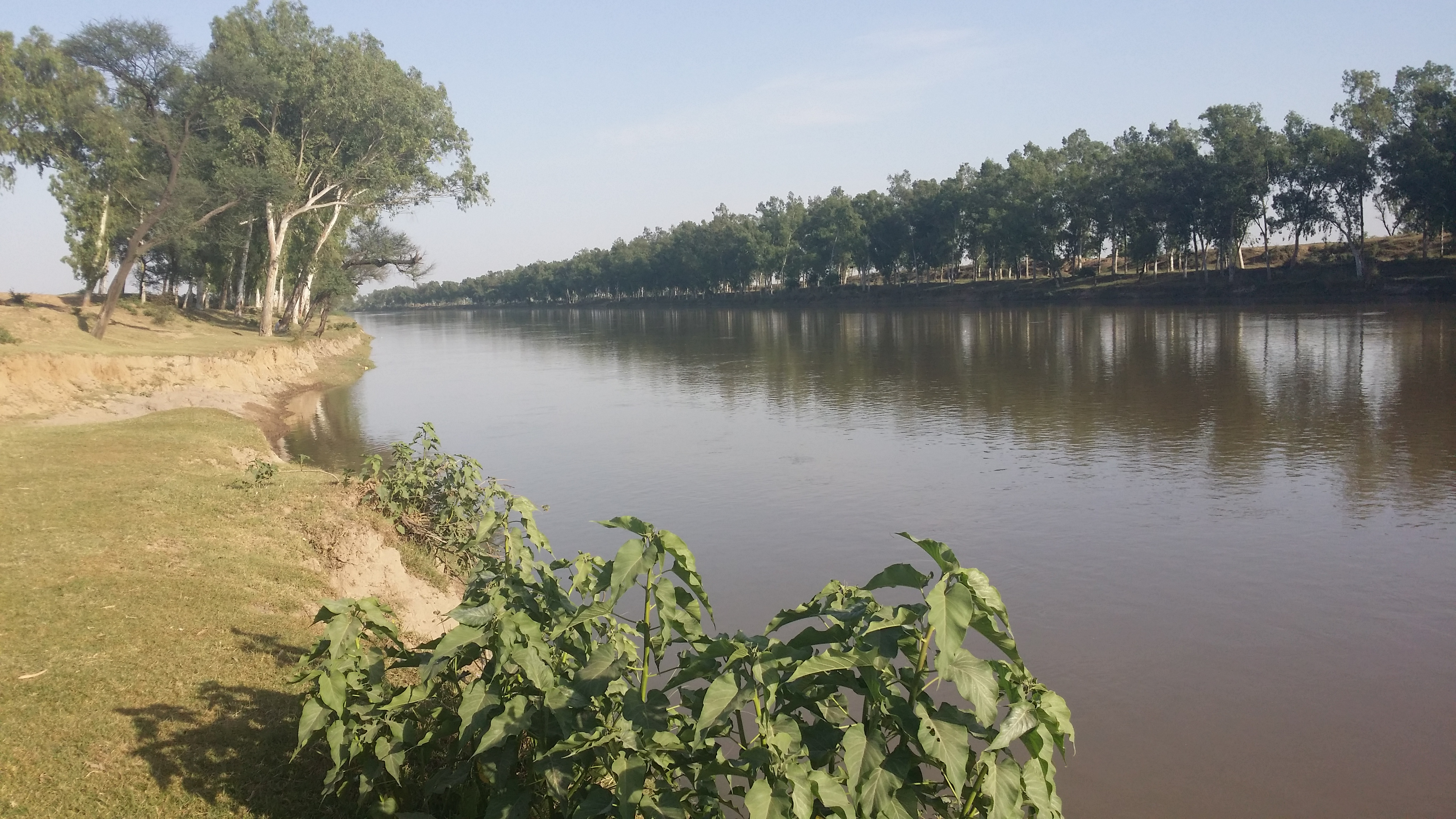

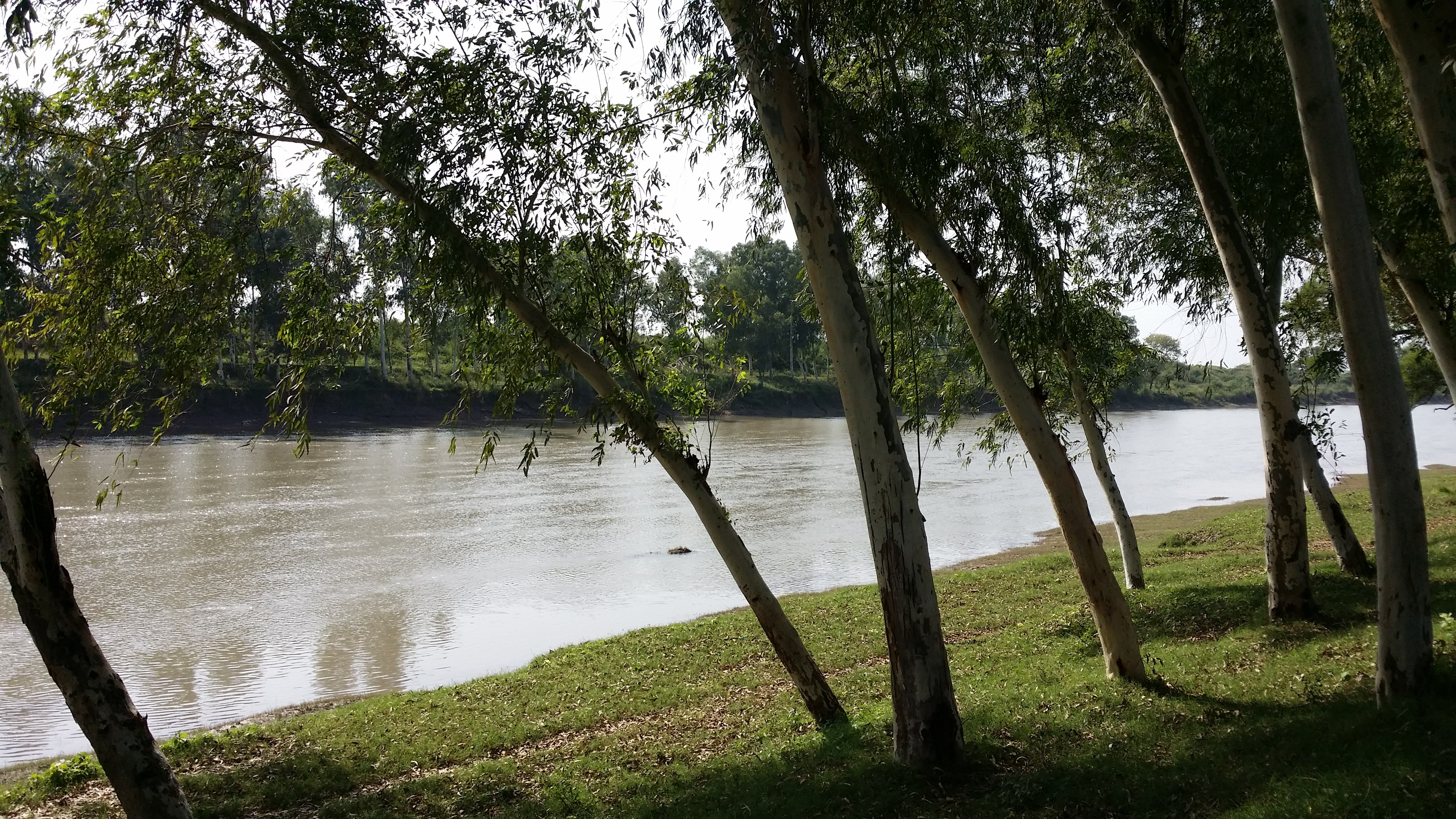

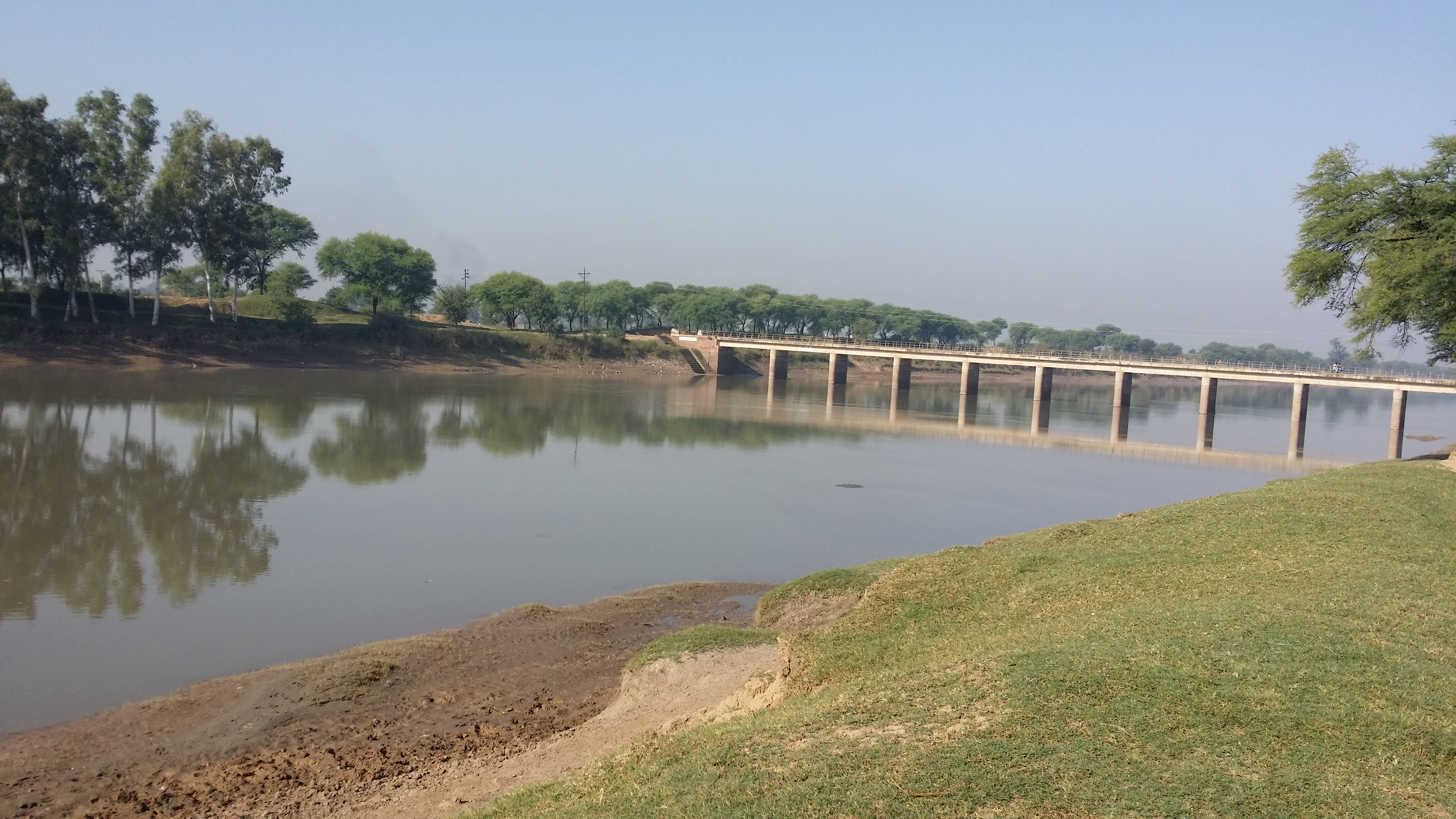
