= Pashulok Barrage =

- Location within Uttarakhand
- Country: India
- Location: Rishikesh
- Coordinates: 30°04′27″N 78°17′18″E
- Status: Operational

Dam and spillways
- Impounds: Ganges River
- Length: 320 m (1,050 ft)
- Spillway capacity: 13,200 m^{3}/s (466,154 cu ft/s)

Reservoir
- Catchment area: 21,400 km^{2} (8,263 mi^{2})
- Normal elevation: 330 m (1,083 ft)

Power Station
- Commission date: 1980
- Hydraulic head: 32.5 m (107 ft)
- Turbines: 4 x 36 MW (48,000 hp) Kaplan-type
- Installed capacity: 144 MW (193,000 hp)

The Pashulok Barrage is a barrage located on the Ganges River just south of Rishikesh in Dehradun district, Uttarakhand, India.

== Chilla Power Plant ==
In a run-of-the-river scheme, the main purpose of the barrage is to divert water into a canal on the east bank of the river which feeds water to the Chilla Power Plant downstream at 29°58′34″N 78°13′11″E, 4 km (2 mi) upstream of Haridwar. The power station contains four 36 megawatts (48,000 hp) Kaplan turbine-generators for an installed capacity of 144 megawatts (193,000 hp). The change in elevation between the plant's intake and tailrace affords is a hydraulic head of 32.5 m (107 ft). The design discharge of the plant is 560 m^{3}/s (19,776 cu ft/s).

== See also ==
- List of power stations in India
