= Ichari Dam =

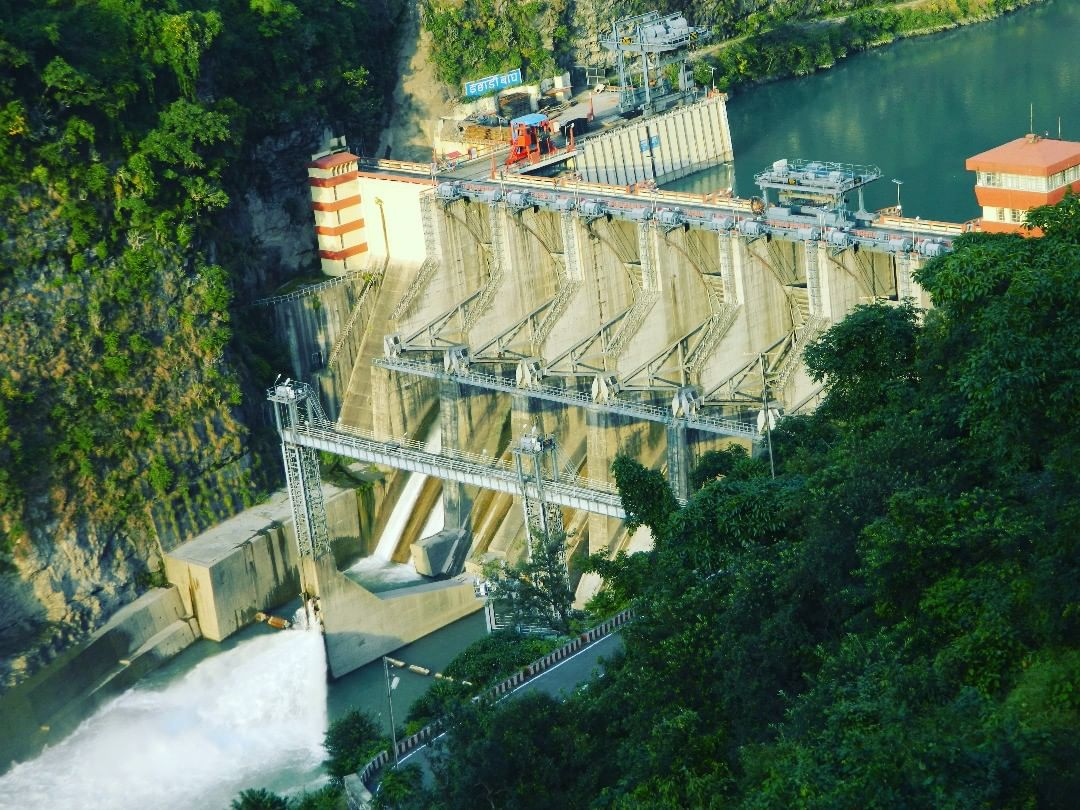
- Ichari Dam on Tons river

- Location within Uttarakhand
- Country: India
- Location: Dakpathar
- Coordinates: 30°36′49″N 77°47′28″E
- Status: Operational
- Opening date: 1972
- Owner: Uttarakhand Jal Vidyut Nigam Ltd (UJVN)

Dam and spillways
- Type of dam: Gravity
- Impounds: Tons River
- Height: 59 m (194 ft)
- Length: 155 m (509 ft)
- Dam volume: 181,000 m^{3} (236,739 cu yd)
- Spillway capacity: 13,500 m^{3}/s (476,748 cu ft/s)

Reservoir
- Creates: Ichari Reservoir
- Total capacity: 8,930,000 m^{3} (7,240 acre⋅ft)
- Active capacity: 5,110,000 m^{3} (4,143 acre⋅ft)
- Surface area: 8 km^{2} (3 sq mi)

Power Station
- Commission date: Chibro: 1975; Khodri: 1984
- Type: Run-of-the-river
- Hydraulic head: Chibro: 110 m (361 ft); Khodri: 57.9 m (190 ft)
- Turbines: Chibro: 4 x 60 MW Francis-type; Khodri: 4 x 30 MW Francis-type
- Installed capacity: Chibro: 240 MW; Khodri: 120 MW

The Ichari Dam is a concrete gravity dam on the Tons River 13 km (8 mi) north of Dakpathar in Uttarakhand, India. The primary purpose of the dam is hydroelectric power production and it is a run-of-the-river-type. It was completed in 1972. The dam diverts water to the Chibro Power Station (240 MW) which is then returned to the Tons River before being fed to the Khodri Power Station (120 MW).

== Design and operation ==
The dam is a 59 m (194 ft) tall and 155 m (509 ft) long concrete gravity type with a structural volume of 181,000 m^{3} (236,739 cu yd). The dam's spillway is located across its crest and is controlled by seven floodgates. It has a maximum discharge capacity of 13,500 m^{3}/s (476,748 cu ft/s). The dam's reservoir has a 8,930,000 m^{3} (7,240 acre⋅ft) capacity, of which 5,110,000 m^{3} (4,143 acre⋅ft) is active (or "useful") capacity. The surface area of the reservoir is 8 km^{2} (3 sq mi).

== Chibro Power Plant ==
Adjacent to the dam and on its left bank, water is diverted into a 6.2 km (4 mi) head-race tunnel which leads south to the underground power station at 30°33′23″N 77°47′53″E. There, the water powers four 60 MW Francis turbine-generators. The design hydraulic head of the station is 110 m (361 ft) and its design discharge is 200 m^{3}/s (7,063 cu ft/s). The plant was commissioned in 1975 and was the first power plant built underground in Northern India. Made by

== Khodri Power Plant ==
Water discharged from the Chibro Power Plant is returned into the Tons River just 100 m (328 ft) upstream of the intake for the Khodri Power Station. Water enters the intake and then travels south down a 7.5 km (5 mi) head-race tunnel which leads to the power station on the Yamuna River at 30°30′30″N 77°47′59″E. There, the water powers four 30 MW Francis turbine-generators before being discharged into a tail-race channel behind the Dakpathar Barrage. The design hydraulic head of the station is 57.9 m (190 ft) and its design discharge is 200 m^{3}/s (7,063 cu ft/s). The plant was commissioned in January 1984.

== See also ==
- List of power stations in India
