= Pondage =

Water storage above the weir of a hydroelectric power plant

Pondage is the small water storage behind the weir of a run-of-the-river hydroelectric power plant. Such a power plant has considerably less storage than the reservoirs of large dams and conventional hydroelectric stations which can store water for long periods such as a dry season or year. With pondage, water is usually stored during periods of low electricity demand and hours when the power plant is inactive, enabling its use as a peaking power plant in dry seasons and a base load power plant during wet seasons. Ample pondage allows a power plant to meet hourly load fluctuations for a period of a week or more.

As a daily hydropeaking cycle of a hydro power plant with pondage results in fast rising river levels downstream, environmental regulations often restrict the full use of the dispatchability as a peaker.

== Calculation ==
Because of the possibility of limited pondage, calculating its effect on power generation is important in determining how often the plant can be operated. The pondage factor is a rough index of the amount pondage needed when the stream flow is constant and the plant is operational during specific periods. It is calculated by the ratio of total inflow hours per week to the hours the power plant will be operated in that same period. For example, if a river has an inflow for seven days a week and the plant operates for five of those days for eight hours:

$$\frac{7 \times 24}{5 \times 8} = 4.2$$

24-hour inflows and plant operation would have a pondage factor of one.

If power is used for twelve hours per day and during the inactive hours, relatively all inflows can be stored, then power can be doubled during active hours. In 12 hours there are 43,200 seconds and in 1 acre⋅ft (1,233 m^{3}) there are 43,560 cu ft (1,233 m^{3}). This gives an estimation and guide that for twelve hours of pondage, there must be as much storage available in the pond as cubic feet per section received.
