= Surge chamber =

In hydropower, a surge chamber is a large pressurized underground chamber creating a free surface in the waterway to improve the dynamic abilities of the power plant waterways. It is generally used for long waterways when a surge shaft can not be created to fulfill the same purpose.

== See also ==
- Surge tank
