= Bhairabi Rural Municipality =

Bhairabi Rural Municipality भैरवी गाउँपालिका (Nepali)
- Rural municipality
- Motto: कृषि पर्यटन हरियाली विकास र पूर्वाधार, भैरवीका चार आधार
- Location in Nepal
- Coordinates: 28.93°N 81.63°E
- Country: Nepal
- Province: Karnali
- District: Dailekh
- No. of wards: 7
- Established: 2016 A.D. (2073 B.S.)

Government
  - Type: Local government
  - Chairperson: Mrs. Rita Kumari shahi (NC)
  - Vice-chairperson: Mrs. Devi Bhandari (NC)

Area
  - Total: 110.46 km^{2} (42.65 sq mi)

Population (2011)
  - Total: 21,233
  - Density: 192.22/km^{2} (497.86/sq mi)
- Time zone: UTC+5:45 (NST)
- Website: http://www.bhairabimun.gov.np/

Bhairabi Rural Municipality (Nepali: भैरवी गाउँपालिका) is a rural municipality located in Dailekh District of Karnali Province of Nepal. The total area of the rural municipality is 110.46 square kilometres (42.65 sq mi) and the total population of the rural municipality as of 2011 Nepal census is 21,233 individuals. The rural municipality is divided into total 7 wards. A small portion of Dullu municipality with Bhairi Kalikathum, Kusapani, Rawalkot and Kasikandh Village development committees were incorporated to form this new rural municipality. The headquarters of the municipality is situated at Bhairi Kalikathum.

The rural municipality was established on 10 March 2017, when Government of Nepal restricted all old administrative structure and announced 744 local level units (although the number increased to 753 later) as per the new constitution of Nepal 2015.

== Geography ==
Bhairabi is a hilly rural municipality of Dailekh district in Karnali Province. The headquarter is situated at coordinates of 28°55'29.13"N Latitudes and 81°37'29.53"E Longitudes and at an elevation of 1359 m. The rural municipality has covered by mid-hill land and high-hill land. The total area of the rural municipality is 110.43 square kilometers.

== Demographics ==
At the time of the 2011 Nepal census, Bhairabi Rural Municipality had a population of 21,233. Of these, 98.6% spoke Nepali and 1.1% Gurung and 0.1% other languages as their first language.

In terms of ethnicity/caste, 32.3% were Chhetri, 24.3% Hill Brahmin, 15.0% Kami, 8.0% Thakuri, 5.0% Magar, 4.7% Sarki, 3.8% Damai/Dholi, 2.5% Sanyasi/Dasnami, 2.3% Gurung, 1.4% Musalman, 0.4% Kumal, 0.3% Badi and 0.1% others.

In terms of religion, 97.3% were Hindu, 1.4% Muslim, 1.1% Buddhist and 0.2% Christian.

In terms of literacy, 60.6% could read and write, 4.2% could only read and 35.1% could neither read nor write.

== Economy ==
The economy of Bhairabi Rural Municipality mostly depends upon agriculture, forest, river and herbs. Bhairabi have only one bank and few co-operative limited. People fulfill their basic needs from local small market. Some modernization can be seen after declaration of rural municipality. New shops of electronics and construction material has been established. Small hotels and tea shops can be seen everywhere near to roads.

The major agriculture products	orange, wheat, mango, rice, millet, corn, banana, onion, beans, ginger.
The major forest products	wood, grass, herbs.
The major river products	sand, stone, aggregate.

== Transportation ==
Being hilly terrain, transportation takes place in Bhairabi rural municipality are mainly by road. Bhairabi is connected by the graveled roads and unsealed roads to the south connecting to Surkhet. The unsealed roads, connecting Kalikot to the northern part of Nepal is under construction.

This road has helped the economic development of the rural municipality, particularly in the fields of agriculture, vegetable farming and also tourism. Buses, Jeep and Hiace provides regular services in the rural municipality. Other vehicle operate several routes. Still northernmost part of Bhairai does not have access to road.

== Climate ==
On the basis of altitude, Bhairabi can be classified into four different sub categories:

Climate Zone	Elevation Range
Upper Tropical	300 to 1,000 meters 1,000 to 3,300 ft.
Subtropical	1,000 to 2,000 meters 3,300 to 6,600 ft.
Temperate	2,000 to 3,000 meters 6,400 to 9,800 ft.
Subalpine	3,000 to 4,000 meters 9,800 to 13,100 ft.

== Festivals and celebrations ==
Majority of the people in this locality are Hindus, they follows festivals like Vijaya Dashami, Tihar, Holi, Janai Purnima, Vishwakarma Puja and so on. The Dashain and Tihar are major festivals. Small population of Muslims and Christian can be found here celebrating festivals Bakra Eid, Christmas and so on.

=== Religious places ===
- Shreesthan Temple at Rawatkot
- Byauli Dharmasala at Kusapani
- Bhairabi Temple at Bhairi Kalikathum

== Health ==
Healthcare in Bhairabi rural municipality is underdeveloped in Nepal. The rural municipality is supported by health post such as Rawatkot Health Post, Bhairi Health Post and Kusapani Health Post. The health post provides regular service with the help of an auxiliary nurse midwife, auxiliary health worker and a health assistant.

== Education ==
Every year thousands of students from all over Bhairabi rural municipality get admission in the various schools. The total number of schools in Bhairabi is 44. Among them 28 are primary schools, 11 are basic schools, two are secondary schools and three are higher secondary schools.

One of the key concerns of educationists and concerned citizens is the massive outflow of students from Bhairabi to outside Bhairabi for studies. The reason for such an out-flux range from perceived low quality of education, political instability and less opportunities in job market.
