= No. 7 Squadron IAF =

No. 7 Squadron Battle Axes
- Insignia of The No. 7 Squadron IAF "Battle Axes"
- Active: 1 December 1942 – present
- Country: Republic of India
- Branch: Indian Air Force
- Role: Air superiority Specialised Ground attack
- Base: Air Force Station Gwalior
- Nickname: Battle Axe
- Mottos: Shatrunjay; Vanquish the enemy

Aircraft flown
- Fighter: Dassault Mirage 2000H

No. 7 Squadron IAF also known as The Battle Axes Squadron nicknamed as Battle Axes is a specialized ground attack combat squadron of the Indian Air Force that operates as a Special Munitions Delivery and air superiority unit. Based at Gwalior AFS, No. 7 Squadron forms a part of 40 Wing AF, Central Air Command.

It is home to the Indian Air Force's elite Tactics and Air Combat Development Establishment (TACDE), a premier unit for advanced fighter pilot training in aerial tactics, focusing on operational doctrines and tactics for aircraft

== Crest ==
No. 7 Squadron Sqn has as its emblem two unfolded wings adorning a Parashu (Battle-axe) and the symbolic number 7 attached to the shaft. Below this crest, on a scroll were the letters Shatrunjay (Close English Translation: Vanquisher of the enemy). This logo was officially approved by President on 26 September 1960, and has adorned aircraft that No. 7 Squadron has flown since.

A Mirage 2000 of the No. 7 Squadron, Gwalior.

== History ==
No. 7 Squadron (Battle Axe) was raised on 1 December 1942 at Vizag equipped with Vultee Vengeance dive bombers. Sqn Ldr HN Chaudhary was the first commanding officer and the personnel were drawn from No. 104 General Reconnaissance and 353 Squadron of RAF plus No. 3 (Calcutta) and No. 6 (Vizagapatnam) Coast Defence Flight, under Air Headquarters formation, order 268 on 19 November 1942. However, initially, the squadron operated Westland Wapitis until it could be armed with the Vultees. The first missions flown by No. 7 Sqn was in Waziristan in the North West Frontier Province in what is now Pakistan in December 1943.

In 1948, No. 7 Squadron became the first Indian Air Force unit to be equipped with jet aircraft when it inducted the de Havilland Vampire. This transition marked the IAF’s entry into the jet age. The introduction of Vampires brought with it significant challenges, including maintenance difficulties and the development of new operational tactics. Nonetheless, No. 7 Squadron’s pioneering role laid the groundwork for jet operations across the IAF.

The squadron has since flown with distinction in a number of conflicts, including 1965, 1971 conflicts, 1999 Kargil War.

== Burma Operations ==
The Squadron was to see extensive action during Second World War. In its first tour of duty between March and September 1944, No. 7 flew a six aircraft detachment against Japanese targets during the Battle of Imphal, initially against Kenji on Chindwin, and later against Japanese supply lines and army convoys along the Tiddim road. In December 1944, No. 7 Sqn moved to Peshawar and converted to the Hurricane Mk.IIc. By March 1945, the unit was back in the Burma Front, flying from Imphal, and later, from Magwe Airfield. It would later move to Samungli in June 1945. In November 1945, the Squadron moved to Gwalior, where it converted to Spitfire Mk.XIVs, which it flew from December 1945 till July 1947, when the squadron converted to the Tempest Mk.II.

For his contributions during World War II the then CO, Squadron Leader P.C. Lal, would win the DFC.

== Independence and Kashmir Operations 1947-48 ==
At the time of the partition No. 7 was based at Risalpur, having converted to the Tempest in June 1947. No.7 Squadron was one of the units allocated to India after the division of the Assets between the two new nations of India and Pakistan. After partition, the unit moved to Agra and was operational within two months of Independence.

The units first post-independence operations was in November 1947. In response to the tribal invasion of the Kashmir kingdom and subsequent accession by Maharaja Hari Singh, India flew in troops and stationed fighters at Srinagar. Tempests of 7 Squadron flew from Ambala in support of Indian Ground troops in the decisive Battle of Shelatang, offensive missions against Uri, Kotli and Rawalkot. The first fatality suffered was on 1 December 1947, when Fg Offr UA D'Cruz was shot down in his Harvard and taken prisoner. He was later awarded the Kirti Chakra (then Ashoka Chakra Cl. II) for his resilience in captivity. For his role in the initial days of operations, the CO Sqn Ldr Noronha was later awarded the Maha Vir Chakra. Flt Lt BS Dogra received the Vir Chakra for his sorties during the Battle of Shalateng.

The Squadron redeployed at Palam on a permanent basis in February 1948. Missions over J&K from the Advanced Landing Ground at Amritsar. These missions were flown in the Poonch area and against Skardu airfield, as well as the Tithwal area. Wg Cdr Ranjan Dutt along with some pilots of 7 Sqn flew to attack the bridge at Domel. The squadron would suffer two fatalities, Fg Offr Balwant Singh and Fg Offr DG Baptiste to ground fire. In August 1948, the squadron set up base in Srinagar and provided support to the army operations near the Zoji La pass. Gilgit airfield was bombed by Tempests on 4 November 1948. For its role, No. 7 Sqn would win five Vir Chakras.

One of the first three Vampires to be delivered to the Indian Air Force. The plane sports the Chakra roundel. This aircraft war later incorporated into No. 7 Sqn

In January 1949, the Squadron moved to Palam where it became the first unit in the IAF to operate the Vampire, which had arrived in November 1948. At that time the squadron was the first unit in the whole of Asia to operate Jet aircraft. The unit now operated one flight with three Vampires and the second flight with Tempests. After converting back to Spitfires in 1949, No. 7 converted to operating only the Vampires in 1951. During this time, No. 7 Sqn came to form the first aerobatics team.

The Vampires were phased out in January 1958, when the new Hawker Hunters were inducted.

Although put on high alert during the Sino-Indian war in 1962, the unit did not see any action in this conflict, mainly due to the government's decision to limit the air force's role to supply and evacuation.

== Indo-Pakistan War 1965 ==
At the onset of the war, the squadron was based at Halwara AFS. Already on a high alert, the unit flew its first offensive sorties on the morning of 6 September, against targets of opportunity. Through the day, the unit would fly twelve missions supporting the Indian Army over the IB. The first fatality suffered was on the evening of the 6th, when a four ship formation was intercepted by PAF Sabres over Taran Taran. In the ensuing battle, Sqn Sqn Ldr AK Rawlley's aircraft hit the ground and exploded.

On the same evening, Halwara Airfield was raided by a three ship formation from PAF No. 5 Sqn. At the time of the raid, No. 7 had two aircraft, Fg Offr PS Pingale and Fg Offr AR Ghandhi, flying on CAP over the airfield. Both were bounced by the Sabres. In the battle that followed, Pingale was shot down before he could give battle. Ghandhi, however, was able to shoot down his adversary before his aircraft fell to the cannon shells of the two remaining Sabres. At about this time, Hunters from No. 27 Sqn returning from a sortie were directed to join the battle, which shot down one of the attackers. The remaining sabre, was claimed that it made itself back to base by the PAF, was also shot down.

The No. 7 was to suffer two more fatalities the next day, when on a dawn strike against PAF Sargodha, a five-ship formation was intercepted. Two of the unit, Sqn Ldr SB Bhagwat and Fg Offr JS Brar, were lost on that day. Hunters from No. 7 Sqn, however, provided ground support for the troops through the war, repeatedly hitting ground targets in support of the army offensives. It hit an ammunition train at Kasur on 8 September, and ground targets in the Lahore area the next day. In a number of these missions, Hunters from different units flew together. On the night of 14 September, B-57 raid at Halwara destroyed two of the squadron's Hunters on the ground.

No. 7's next air-to-air kill was on 16 September, when Fg Offr PS Pingale shot down a F-86 Sabre over Tarn Tarn. His wingman Fg Offr Farokh Dara Bunsha from No. 20 Sqn was shot down and killed. Another aircraft fell on 20 September, when Fg Offr SK Sharma ejected from his badly damaged Hunter was over Kasur on 20 September. The unit however, lost Sqn Ldr DP Chatterjee, who had joined 7 Sqn on deputation from 20 Sqn was killed in the same battle.

Although the squadron's figures at the war are not impressive compared to what it would go on to achieve in six years, it remains true that it was seriously limited in its deep penetration strikes, operating ammunition-laden Hunters at maximum range in IAF's strike against bases as deep as PAF Sargodha. However, No. 7 squadron- along with the other squadrons operating the Hunter- proved to be invaluable in ground-attack roles. In total, the Battleaxes flew 453 sorties (including 109 CAP) amounting to nearly 333 Hours, expending 218 rockets and 13000 lbs of bombs. In the course of the war, the squadron flew a total of 128 strike missions and 46 Combat Air Patrol sorties. Three pilots were killed along with another two on deputation from 20 Sqn. Nine aircraft were lost in the course of the war. For their contribution, No. 7 was awarded 4 VrCs (S Malik, AS Lamba, PS Pingale and AR Ghandhi) and five mentioned in dispatches. For its impressive record in the air as well as on ground, the squadron received commendations from the Prime Minister L B Shastri, the Defence Minister Shri YB Chavan and Chief of Air Staff, Air Chief Marshal Arjan Singh. After the war No. 7 would move to Hindon AB in November 1965 and also took on the role of Operational Conversion Unit with the addition of a Hunter Trainer Flight. However, the unit was moved again in March 1969, this time to Bagdogra.

== Bangladesh War, 1971 ==
No. 7 is probably the only unit to have flown both in the Eastern and Western theaters during the war. Operations in 1971 Eastern Operations (Main article: East Pakistan Operations 1971) Immediately following preemptive PAF strikes on the western airfields, the first strikes were flown on the morning of 4 December against targets in East Pakistan. Repeated strikes were carried out on airfields in Dacca as well as ground targets. One of these strikes destroyed the bridge over the River Teesta. The first fatalities were suffered when an attack on a train at Lal Munir Hat came up against fierce ack ack. Both of the two badly damaged Hunters eventually lost crossed the IB into friendly airspace. Fg Offr Andre Da Costa's Hunter went out of control and crashed, killing him. The Hunter leader, Sqn Ldr SK Gupta ejected safely over Baghdogra airfield. In total, No. 7 flew 40 sorties in the east before it was pulled out to the western theatre.

No. 7 Squadron (Hunters) flew to Hindon AB on 6 December. The next day a flight of eight Hunters deployed at Nal. The squadron provided close support to the troops, repeatedly hitting Pakistani targets. In one of the first missions against Pakistani tanks in Ganganagar, a Hunter was lost to ground fire. Its pilot was the charismatic Officer Commanding (O.C.) of the squadron, Wing Commander (and later, Air Vice Marshal) Bernard Anthony Coelho. Wing Commander Coelho ejected over No Man's Land and was taken prisoner by Pakistani ground forces before he could be located by Indian troops. He was replaced by Wg Cdr Nirmal Chandra Suri on 09 Dec. Interdiction sorties were also flown against targets in the Suleimanke Headworks area. One of these missions on 9 December, flown by Flying Officer Diskhit, landed with the fuel gauges reading zero. Towards the end of the war, the squadron moved to Pathankot, where it stayed till the end of the war. The squadron was awarded Three VrCs, and one Vayu sena Medal. Three other pilots were mentioned in dispatches.

== After Bangladesh ==
After the end of the war, the unit was positioned at Bagdogra from where it moved to Chandigarh in 1973 to convert to MIG 21MF. The Squadron then moved to Pathankot. The OC of the unit in 1972 was Wg Cdr RV Singh and in 1973 Wg Cdr Trilochan Singh (later Air Marshal- SASO of WAC). Sqn Ldr AY Tipnis was the Flight Commander of the newly converted Mig 21MF sqn (later Chief of Air Staff). Sqn Ldr SP Tyagi (later Chief of the Air Staff) was also with the Sqn in 1973.

The Sqn was the first IAF Sqn to convert to the Mirage 2000, in a ceremonial parade on 29 June 1985.

In June 1987, during Operation Poomalai, Four Mirage 2000s from No. 7, in anticipation of air opposition from the Sri Lankan Air Force, provided air-cover for the five An 32 detailed to airdrop food supplies over Jaffna.

The Battle Axes were called into action again on 3 November 1988 during Operation Cactus, when India responded to a plea for help by the Maldives government following a military coup. While the Il-76s of No.44 Squadron flew in troops from the Para brigade into the capital Male, six Mirages operating from Trivandrum made several passes over the Islands in a show of force. Wg Cdr Vaidya led the first formation with Flt Lt R Nambiar over the Hulule airfield.

== Kargil Operations in May 1999 - Op Safed Sagar ==
No. 7 squadron was back in action again in May 1999, called to assist the Army in the area North, North-East of Kargil during Operation Vijay. The Battle Axes at that time was under the command of Wg Cdr Sandeep Chabra. For the first time, the IAF had employed Precision guided munitions to strike the supply lines of the entrenched enemy.

After the failure of the first strikes by Jaguars, the task was assigned to the Mirages. Flying from Adampur AFB, Mirages of No.7 Sqn, Gwalior struck Tigerhill, Muntho Dhalo, Tololing. Along with the LGBs, 1000lbers were also used. On one particular sortie, a Mirage came upon a Pakistani Army Helicopter, but did not engage as it was in the moment of crossing back over the LoC.

Wg Cdr Chabra received the Yudh Seva Medal(YSM). Wg Cdr R Nambiar, who was an experienced test pilot attached to 7 Squadron during the course of operations was awarded the Vayusena Medal (VM) Gallantry, having flown over 25 sorties during that period delivering PGMs in precision attacks. Wg Cdr CH Kulkarni and Sqn Ldr DK Patnaik, from the strike team destroyed 9 bunkers which helped the ground troops to capture Tiger Hill with ease also received the Vayu Sena Medal. Sqn Ldr AS Heer, was awarded the VM, having shown considerable ingenuity to record the effects of the bomb-strikes. Sqn Ldr KI Ravi, of No. 1 Sqn, who devised the adaptation of the 1000 lb bombs to the Mirage was also awarded the VSM

== Operation Parakram ==
In 2002 Mirage-2000s from the squadron used Precision Guided Munitions to destroy posts captured by Pakistan Army in the Machal sector of the LoC.

== Balakot Airstrike ==
In 2019, At around 3.30 am on February 26, the fighter jets flew from the No. 7 squadron (Gwalior Air Force Station) and entered into PoK. The jets demolished the Jaish-e-Mohammed (JeM) terror camp in Balakot in the Khyber Pakhtunkhwa province of Pakistan. The entire operation, from the aircraft entering PoK and landing back in India, lasted about 21 minutes.

== Aircraft ==
| Aircraft | From | To | Air Base |
Pre-Independence (1942–47)
| Westland Wapiti | December 1942 | April 1943 | Visakhapatnam |
| Vultee A-31 Vengeance | May 1943 | September 1944 | Gwalior |
| Harvard IIC | November 1944 | May 1946 | Kumbhirgram |
| Harvard IIB | August 1944 | January 1948 | Samungli |
| Spitfire VIII | December 1945 | October 1946 | Samungli |
Post-Independence (1947–Present)
| Hawker Tempest II | June 1947 | January 1950 | AFS Agra |
| Vampire F3 | December 1948 | November 1951 | AFS Palam |
| Spitfire VIII | January 1950 | September 1951 | AFS Palam |
| Vampire FB52 | March 1951 | January 1958 | AFS Palam |
| Hawker Hunter Mk 56 | January 1958 | 1961 | AFS Palam |
| Hawker Hunter Mk 56 | 1961 | 1965 | AFS Ambala |
| Hawker Hunter Mk 56 | November 1965 | 1971 | AFS Hindon |
| Hawker Hunter Mk 56 | 1971 | June 1973 | AFS NAL |
| MiG-21 MF | July 1973 | July 1981 | AFS Chandigarh |
| MiG-21 M | July 1981 | December 1984 | AFS Chandigarh |
| Dassault Mirage 2000H | July 1985 | Present | AFS Gwalior |

== See also ==
- First Kashmir War
- Indo-Pakistani War of 1965
- Indo-Pakistani War of 1971
- East Pakistan Operations 1971
- Kargil War
- Operation Safed Sagar
- Balakot Air Strike
