= No. 8 Squadron PAF =

No. 8 Squadron Haiders
- Active: 11 May 1960 - 1968; 1983 - Present
- Disbanded: 1968-1983
- Country: Pakistan
- Allegiance: Pakistan Armed Forces
- Branch: Pakistan Air Force
- Type: Flying Squadron
- Role: Tactical Attack
- Part of: Southern Air Command; No. 32 Tactical Attack Wing
- Airbase: PAF Base Masroor
- Nickname: Haiders
- Motto: اک اور ضرب حیدری
- Aircraft: JF-17 Block 3
- Engagements: Indo-Pakistani conflict; 1965 Indo-Pakistani War; 1965 air war

Commanders
- Notable commanders: Rais Ahmad Rafi; Kaiser Tufail

Aircraft flown
- Attack: Mirage-5PA2; Mirage-5PA3
- Bomber: Martin B-57B Canberra
- Trainer: Martin B-57C; Mirage-5DPA2; Mirage-5DD

No. 8 Squadron, nicknamed the Haiders, is a tactical attack squadron from the No. 32 TA Wing of the Pakistan Air Force's Southern Air Command. It is currently deployed at Masroor Airbase and operates the JF-17 Block 3 Multi-role fighter.

== History ==
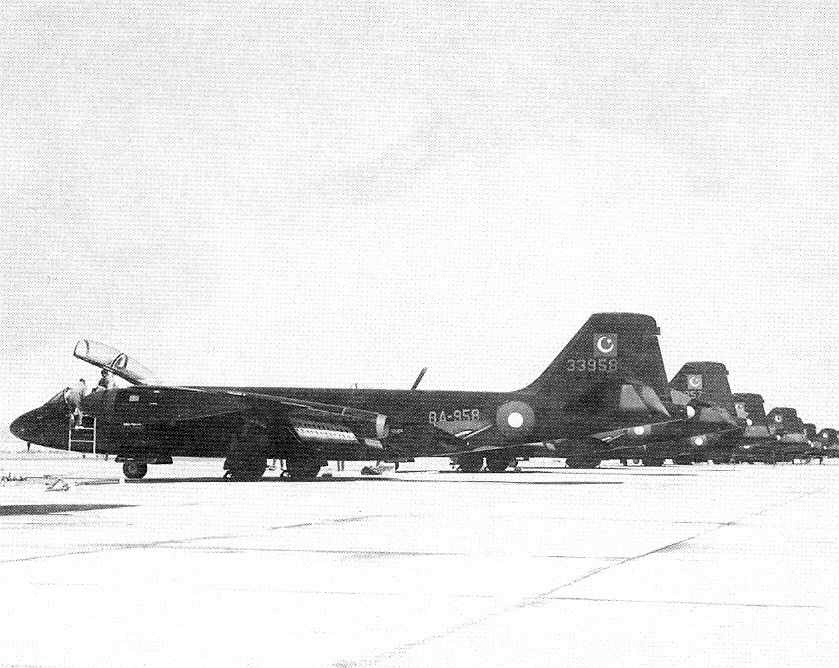
B-57s of the 31st Bomber Wing of PAF

The No. 8 Squadron was raised in 1960 at the Mauripur Airbase. Being part of the 31st Bomber Wing of PAF, it was quickly equipped with Martin B-57 Canberra bombers which Pakistan received as part of the 1955 Pakistan-US mutual defence treaty. These consisted of 1 B-57C trainer variant & a dozen or so B-57B variants which were bought from the USAF's 345th Bombardment Wing after it was disbanded.

Throughout its service with the PAF, No. 8 Squadron participated in several armament competitions and Military exercises. Later in the 1965 War, the squadron together with the Bandits squadron conducted heavy airstrikes on several Indian Airforce bases. After the war however, the Haider's B-57 fleet had been considerably effected due to crashes and lack of spares & technical support as a result of postwar US Sanctions, hence its B-57s along with other assets (including the pilots) were transferred to the Bandits and the squadron was number plated in 1968 after its Officer Commanding Rais Ahmad Rafi completed the command of the squadron before being deployed to Iraq.

The squadron was raised again in 1983 this time re-equipped with newly inducted Dassault Mirage 5 strike fighters. It became the PAF's first squadron to be assigned the role of Maritime Support, as a result the squadron worked closely with the Pakistan Navy taking part in several naval exercises.

=== Operational history ===
==== World's first bomber formation loop ====
On 27 October 1964, during an air show organized at Peshawar, a formation of four Haider B-57s led by Wing Commander Nazir Latif performed a spectacular Aerobatics demonstration in honour of the visiting Indonesian air chief; Air Marshal Omar Dani. These included the first-ever aerobatic loop with a bomber aircraft along with rolls and wingovers, something which a heavy and bulky aircraft like the B-57 was barely capable of.

==== 1965 Indo-Pakistani War ====
During the 1965 Indo-Pakistani War, PAF launched an aggressive airstrike campaign throughout India targeting various Indian airbases in retaliation to the Indian invasion. The 31st Bomber Wing was tasked to disable IAF runways at Jamnagar, Adampur & Pathankot.

===== Jamnagar Airstrikes =====
On the first night of the Lahore invasion, Haider B-57s started a series of bombing raids on Jamnagar which was India's main frontline base in the southern sector. During these night raids, one B-57 along with its pilot (Squadron Leader Shabbir Alam Siddiqui) and Navigator (Squadron Leader Aslam Qureshi) were lost after their plane hit the ground while dive bombing the Jamnagar runway. The crash was officially credited to low visibility & the over-fatigued crew. However prior to their unfortunate crash, the crew had managed to heavily crater the runway which halted further Indian air operations from Jamnagar. It was later revealed that they prevented 8 Hawker Sea Hawk fighters of the Indian navy from taking off the next day which were going to attack the PAF's main Radar at Badin. Rear Admiral (Retd) Satyendra Singh Jamwal of the Indian Navy in his book "Blueprint to Bluewater" states:

Had the eight Seahawk aircraft at Jamnagar been allowed to bomb the ‘seeing eye’ of PAF and its air defence establishment at Badin (…) on the morning of Sept 7 as had been scheduled, the war would have been over much earlier and (Indian) aircraft losses would have been minimised.

Even though Jamnagar was barely operational at this point, Haider B-57s kept performing night bombing raids in order to completely prevent further Indian air operations in the South. Other than structural damages, a number of De Havilland Vampires were also destroyed in these raids further crippling Indian aerial capabilities in the South. Moreover, 2/3rd of the Squadron had been deployed to Peshawar during this period in order to reinforce Pakistani operations up north as Air superiority was already achieved in the southern sector.

===== Airstrikes on Adampur =====
On 9 September, the Officer Commanding of Haiders led a night bombing mission on Adampur during which heavy damage was inflicted on enemy infrastructure after which the bombers headed for Peshawar Airbase in order to meet up with the rest of the squadron.

===== Airstrikes on Halwara =====
After night fell on 12 September, the squadron launched airstrikes on the Halwara Airbase.

===== Airstrikes on Pathankot =====
On 13 September, the squadron's B-57s struck the Pathankot Airbase dropping more than 8000lbs of payload through heavy ack-ack fire on the already battered Indian airbase.

===== High-altitude bombing on Sri Nagar =====
On 14 September, the squadron took part in a daring daytime High level bombing mission on Srinagar Airbase.

===== Airstrikes on Ambala =====
The mauling of Ambala commenced on the night of 20 September with a solo raid by the famous 8-Pass Charlie of No. 7 Squadron followed up by No. 8 squadron's B-57s 15 minutes apart from each other. The fires started by 8-Pass Charlie's airstrikes enabled the Haider night bombers (one of which was being flown by the OC Squadron Leader Rais A. Rafi himself) to pinpoint the Ambala runway accurately and heavily crater it with time delayed 1000lbs bombs.

===== Close air support missions =====
On 11 September, the squadron's OC led Close Air Support sorties in support of Pakistani & Kashmiri separatist forces in the Samba area of Indian Administered Kashmir.

The squadron flew its last combat sortie (A Close Air Support mission) over Sialkot District when it struck retreating Indian army artillery & cavalry units.

==== 1971 Indo-Pakistani War ====
After India invaded East Pakistan in late 1971, PAF launched Operation Chengiz Khan from West Pakistan in order to ease pressure on the Pakistani forces defending the East. Though No. 8 Squadron had been number plated, its former pilots took active part in the 31st Wing's bombing missions by serving with the No. 7 Squadron.

==== Maritime operations ====
During its tenure as a Maritime support squadron, Two Haider Mirage Vs intercepted INS Talwar (1959) on 24 September 1992 after it crossed into Pakistani territorial seas. The Mirages flown by Flight Lieutenant Ali & Flight Lieutenant Mazhar later forced the Indian ship out of Pakistani waters.

In May 1995, Mirages of No. 8 Squadron engaged with USS Abraham Lincoln during the joint exercise "Inspired Alert" with US Central Command. The mission was to successfully penetrate the aircraft carrier's early warning systems and perimeter defences after which the Mirages would fire a simulated Exocet anti-ship missile. This task was accomplished by the Squadron's Officer Commanding "Wing Commander Asim Suleiman" & his wingman "Flight Lieutenant Ahmed Hassan" after executing a well planned multi-directional attack with three Mirage pairs that led to the carrier's defences being overloaded. None of the Haiders were intercepted by carrier's fighters.

== Exercises ==
=== National ===
Airforce Exercises

- ACES
  - 1998
    - Earned first place amongst Tactical Attack squadrons.
- DACT
  - Deployed to Samungli Airbase, Minhas Airbase, Shahbaz Airbase and Multan Airport.
- Exercise High Mark
  - 1993
  - 1995
- Exercise Saffron Bandit
  - 1990
  - 1992
  - 1995
  - 1997
- Flight Safety Trophy
  - 1997
- Inter Squadron Armament Competition (ISAC)
  - 1996
    - Earned second position
- Missile Firing Camp
  - 1998

Naval Exercises

- Exercise Nasim-ul-Bahr
  - 1994
    - Sunk a decommissioned PNS Shah Jahan with an Exocet.
- Exercise Sea Spark

=== International ===
Naval Exercises

- Exercise Inspired Alert
  - 1994
  - 1995
    - Successfully penetrated USS Abraham Lincoln (CVN-72) defences and fired a simulated Exocet at the aircraft carrier.
  - 1997

== See also ==
- List of Pakistan Air Force squadrons
