= Operation Chengiz Khan =

Pakistan Air Force operation during the Indo-Pakistani War of 1971

- Part of the Indo-Pakistani War of 1971
- Locations of airstrikes carried out by the Pakistan Air Force
Date	3 December 1971
Location	11 Forward airfields
Result	Pakistani failure: Formal commencement of the Indo-Pakistani War of 1971

Belligerents
India; Indian Air Force	Pakistan; Pakistan Air Force

Commanders and leaders
Pratap Chandra Lal	Abdur Rahim Khan; P. D. Callaghan; Eric Gordon Hall; Sharbat Ali Changezi

Strength
Anti-aircraft guns SAM missiles	36 aircraft in first two waves 15 aircraft in a third wave

Casualties and losses
No material damage to most of the IAF airfields, with only the runways at Amritsar getting cratered and a radar station destroyed. Most airfields repaired within same night.	4 aircraft shot down

Operation Chengiz Khan was the code name assigned to the preemptive strikes carried out by the Pakistan Air Force on the forward airbases and radar installations of the Indian Air Force (IAF) on the evening of 3 December 1971, and marked the formal initiation of hostilities of the Indo-Pakistani War of 1971. It was named after the Mongol conqueror Genghis Khan.

The operation targeted 11 of India's airfields and also included artillery strikes on Indian positions in Kashmir. The targets were the Indian airbases of Amritsar, Ambala, Agra, Awantipur, Bikaner, Halwara, Jodhpur, Jaisalmer, Pathankot, Bhuj, Srinagar and Uttarlai and air defence radars at Amritsar and Faridkot.

Notwithstanding the multiplicity of targets, the Pakistani air strikes were ineffectual and failed to inflict any material damage to the IAF airfields, only cratering the runways at Amritsar and destroying a radar station. The PAF reportedly lost four aircraft during the raid.

In an address to the nation on radio that same evening, then Indian Prime Minister Indira Gandhi held the air strikes to be a declaration of war against India and the Indian Air Force responded with initial air strikes the same night, which were expanded to massive retaliatory air strikes the next morning. Statements released by both nations the next day confirmed the "existence of a state of war between the two countries", although neither government formally issued a declaration of war.

== Background ==
In March 1971, East Pakistan (now Bangladesh) declared independence from Pakistan, starting the Bangladesh Liberation War following rising political discontent and cultural nationalism among the people of East Pakistan and the brutal suppressive force from West Pakistan in response (see Operation Searchlight and 1971 Bangladesh atrocities).

Pakistan came under increasing criticism from India, the Soviet Union, Japan, and Europe as the plight of the refugees and their impact on the Indian economy were highlighted by Indira Gandhi in the UN and on a number of global tours. However, the United States and China showed little interest in the situation and actively opposed aid, intervention or support to the Mukti Bahini (possibly fearing advancement of Soviet influence deep into South Asia). India's aid to the Mukti Bahini continued unabated, and fighting between the Mukti Bahini and the Pakistani forces grew increasingly vicious. On 9 August 1971, India signed a twenty-year cooperation treaty with the Soviet Union in which each promised military support to the other in the event it was attacked. This provided India cover against any possible Chinese or American intervention in aid of Pakistan if it went to war with India. To the Pakistani leadership, it became clear that armed Indian intervention and secession of East Pakistan was becoming inevitable.

== Strategy of pre-emption ==
By October 1971, the Mukti Bahini had started launching massive raids deep into East Pakistan, with active support from the Indian Army beginning in November. The situation had deteriorated to a state of active undeclared war in the East by the end of November, when Indian and Mukti Bahini forces launched offensives on both the eastern and western borders of East Pakistan. Regular Indian Army troops engaged and mauled Pakistani armour at Garibpur, during which the two intruding Pakistan Air Force jets were shot down and another badly damaged in the Battle of Boyra while offensive manoeuvres were launched in Atgram against Pakistani border posts and communications centres along the eastern border. The Mukti Bahini also launched an offensive on Jessore at this time. It was clear to Islamabad by this time that open conflict was inevitable, and that East Pakistan was indefensible in the long run. Yahya Khan chose at this point to try to protect Pakistan's integrity and to hold India by Ayub Khan's strategy – "The defence of East Pakistan lies in the West".

This policy made the assumptions that an open conflict with India would not last long due to international pressure, and since East Pakistan was undefendable, the war-effort should be concentrated on occupying as large an area of Indian territory as possible as a bargaining tool at the negotiating table. To this end, General Tikka Khan had proposed an offensive into India, and the PAF's overriding priority was to give maximum support to this offensive. The initial plans for the offensive called for at least a temporary cover of air dominance by the PAF under which Khan's troops could conduct a lightning campaign deep into Western India before digging in and consolidating their positions. In order to achieve air dominance, Pakistan decided to launch an offensive counter air strike codenamed Operation Chengiz Khan on Indian airbases.

A second objective for the PAF was to conduct air interdiction against the supply routes for the Indian troops opposing Khan's proposed offensive, but these were accorded as secondary targets to be engaged after the operation started.

The PAF's strikes were based on the same strategy of pre-emptive neutralization of enemy air capability used by the Israeli Air Force against Arab air forces in Operation Focus during the Six-Day War of 1967.

The decision to hit India with a pre-emptive air strike was taken on 30 November 1971 during a meeting among the Pakistani President, General Yahya Khan, Chief of Army Staff General Abdul Hamid Khan, and the Chief of General Staff Lt. Gen. Gul Hassan Khan.

The objectives of the strike were:

- To surprise the IAF by attacking its forward airfields when it was least expected.
- To neutralize these in order to obtain at least temporary battlefield air superiority in the West.
- To counter-balance the Indian numerical advantage by hitting the forward operating bases of the Indian Air Force as a measure reducing the weight of expected counterattacks on PAF's own bases.

To achieve surprise, the decision was made to strike on a Friday, the day of the jumu'ah (Muslim Sabbath), at 17:45 hrs when shifts in IAF control centers were changing. Emulating its operations' experience in battle against the Indian Air Force during the Indo-Pakistani Conflict of 1965, the decision was made to hit the Indian bases in a two-wave dusk strike followed by a number of night-interdiction missions through the night. The plans for the strike also anticipated the Indians securing their aircraft in blast pens. Also, anticipating difficulty in target acquisition for camouflaged targets such as fuel tanks, ammunition dumps and command centers, the primary objectives set for the operation were the runways and air defense radars.

=== The II Corps offensive into Punjab ===
Under Chengiz Khan, Pakistan's II Corps offensive plan involved driving east from the vicinity of Bahawalnagar to cross the international border and push towards Bhatinda and Ludhiana in India's "Foxtrot Sector" or "F Sector."

While describing the situation in the "F sector" of India, John H. Gill writes:

With poor dispositions and inept leadership, India's 67 Brigade lost a significant parcel of land to Pakistan's 105 Brigade despite repeated and costly counterattacks. Fortunately for India, indecision on the part of Pakistan's high command kept its potentially powerful II Corps from executing a planned offensive against India's "Foxtrot Sector" (or simply "F Sector").

The II Corps offensive plan called for 105 Brigade and 25 Brigade to come under II Corps, while IV Corps advanced from its positions along the Ravi.

The PAF had also positioned mobile radar and pre-stocked forward airfields in the proposed battle area to support the planned attack.

Army headquarters ordered II Corps to shift to its forward assembly areas on 14 December and major elements of 1 Armored Division began to move the following day, while the 7 Division was also concentrating south of the Sutlej. However, by now, a major part of II Corps, 33 Division, had been broken up to reinforce Pakistani units against Indian offensives elsewhere.

Thus, the II Corps offensive was deprived of approximately one third of its striking power before it had even begun.

On 16 December, Army headquarters issued new orders "freezing all movements" until further notice. Trains carrying equipment of 1 Division were unloaded, and II Corps, with its units on both sides of the Sutlej, settled in to await orders. If the operation had proceeded as planned, the corps would likely have launched their attack in the early morning of 17 December. However, due to the "freeze" order, they remained on the Pakistan side of the border and were unable to cross before the cease-fire came into effect at 2000 hours on the same day.

Pakistan's failure to launch the offensive in a timely manner has generated great controversy among subsequent commentators.

== First strikes ==
The final orders for the strike were issued at 17:30 hrs on Friday 3 December 1971. The first formations were in flight and heading for their targets by 17:40 hrs. Officially, it was announced via government channels that the airstrikes were launched in response to attacks along the western border on Pakistan Rangers' outposts by regular troops of the Indian army, which the Indian Air Force was providing support to. The Indians would later deny any engagement on the Western Front. However, the Indian air defence radars failed to detect the approaching formations. The first indications for the Indians of the impending assault was the roar of the strike aircraft over their airfields, while in Delhi, the air-raid sirens were the first indications for newsmen, gathered for the daily brief of the East-Pakistan situation, that something was going on.

The first of the strikes were mounted against Pathankot Airbase. Led by a flight of two Mirage IIIs (a reconnaissance craft and a strike escort) a six-plane wing of F-86F Sabres flying from Murid and led by Wing Commander S N Jilani hit the airbase with unguided rockets and dropped several 125 kg bombs. The main target of this strike was the runway, which was damaged and took the Indian ground crew several hours to repair. The strikes targeted the main runway and Air-defence radars, which were timed to coincide with a changing shift of IAF air controllers. Sabers were also dispatched to strike Srinagar and Pathankot. These missions went unopposed since the IAF had not scrambled any interception, and faced only anti-aircraft fire. Pathankot was later defended by interceptors from Adampur following this first strike during the time it took the ground crew to repair its runway.

At 17:45 hrs, four Mirages flying from Sargodha and led by Wing Commander Hakimullah attacked Amritsar Airbase. Hakimullah's flight was armed with two 500 kg bombs each, which the strike used efficiently hitting the first 300m of the runway and cratering it enough to leave it nonoperational for several hours. However, the Amritsar runway was repaired within the same night to receive detachments of Mig 21s and Su-7 that flew against Rafiqui airbase the next morning. A second strike of two F-104 Starfighters, led by Wing Commander Amjad H Khan hit the P-35 radar station at Amritsar, rendering it inoperable for nearly an hour. Two Sukhois then took off from the one remaining serviceable lane of the runway, moments before it was bombed by a passing B-57 Canberra.

Within forty-five minutes of these strikes, Pakistani troops had shelled India's western frontier and were reported to have crossed the border at Punch in the state of Jammu.

== Followup counter-air strikes ==
The third wave of the PAF counter air strikes were directed to strike Ambala, Agra and Halwara around 18:00 hrs and continued in single or two-plane formations through the evening until at least 22:30 hrs. These strikes involved fifteen B-57 Canberras, four T-33s, and one C-130. The B-57s flew seven single-plane sorties. These caused significant damage, especially in Uttarlai, and Halwara and impeded IAF's preparation for retaliation.

Ambala Airbase was hit by a two plane B-57 formation led by Wg. Cdr. Rais Ahmad Rafi. The flight hit the runway with eight bombs, causing minor damage.

Like Ambala, Agra Airbase, which lay deepest among the PAF's targets that evening, was struck by a two-plane B-57 formation led by Wg. Cdr. Yunus and followed by Flight Lieutenant Mazhar Bukhari. The bombs dropped by Yunus did not explode. Rais Rafi explained the old age of the bombs as the reason for their ineffectiveness as these were supposed to be used in the Second World War. The first Indian counter strikes launched that very night included the Canberras of No.5 Sqn based at Agra.

Sirsa was hit by Sqn. Ldr. Alvi with bombs equipped with time-delayed fuses, damaging the runway heavily and forcing the runway to be closed for the rest of the night.

Four T-33s from A-Flight No.2 Squadron, led by Sqn. Ldr. Qureshi, hit Uttarlai, causing damage to the runway. These were launched at the same time as the second strike over Srinagar. Uttarlai was attacked a second time later that night by Wg. Cdr. Akhtar. The net damage to the runway was significant enough to keep the runway closed for six days and for the taxiway to be used instead.

In the south, Sqn. Ldr. Ishtak Qureshi's bombs hit the underground power cable at Jaisalmer, cutting off the power supply and telephone connection for six hours. At the same time, Jodhpur was hit by two B-57s led by Sqn. Ldr. Sohail Mansur while Jamnagar was hit by Flt. Lt. Ejaz Azam.

== Indian retaliation ==
As Indian Prime Minister Indira Gandhi addressed the nation on radio shortly after midnight informing about the Pakistani attack, the Indian Air Force struck back. By 21:00hrs, the Canberras of the No.35 Squadron and No.106 Squadron, as well as No.5 and No.16 squadron were armed and ready for attacks deep into Pakistan. These flew against eight Western Pakistani airbases: Murid, Mianwali, Sargodha, Chandhar, Risalewala, Rafiqui, and Masroor. In total, 23 combat sorties were launched that night, inflicting heavy damage to Sargodha and Masroor airbases. Converted An-12 Transport aircraft also dropped 48 x 500 lb bombs over Changa Manga, triggering massive fires in the logistics and supply dumps for the Pakistani army. The PAF units stationed on these airfields had to operate from taxiways for the following two days.

Through the night, the Indian Air Force also struck the main East Pakistani airfields of Tejgaon, and later Kurmitola. At the same time, the Indian Air Force was deploying additional aircraft to its forward airfields for the strikes that were to follow the next morning. Within days, India was able to achieve air superiority.

== Analysis ==
Of its stated objectives, the PAF was unable to neutralize the Indian Air Force in the west, which on its part had dispersed its aircraft in hardened aircraft shelters, suffering only minor damage to a few aircraft.

As Newsweek magazine (1971) described the attack:

Trying to catch the Indian Air Force napping, Yahya Khan, launched a Pakistani version of Israel's 1967 air blitz in hopes that one rapid attack would cripple India's far superior air power. But India was alert, Pakistani pilots were inept, and Yahya's strategy of scattering his thin air force over a dozen airfields was a bust!

== See also ==
- Timeline of the Bangladesh Liberation War
- Military plans of the Bangladesh Liberation War
- Mitro Bahini order of battle
- Pakistan Army order of battle, December 1971
- Evolution of Pakistan Eastern Command plan
