= Kaiser Tufail =

Pakistan Air Force fighter pilot (active 1975–2005)

Air Commodore Kaiser Tufail SI(M)
- قیصر طفیل
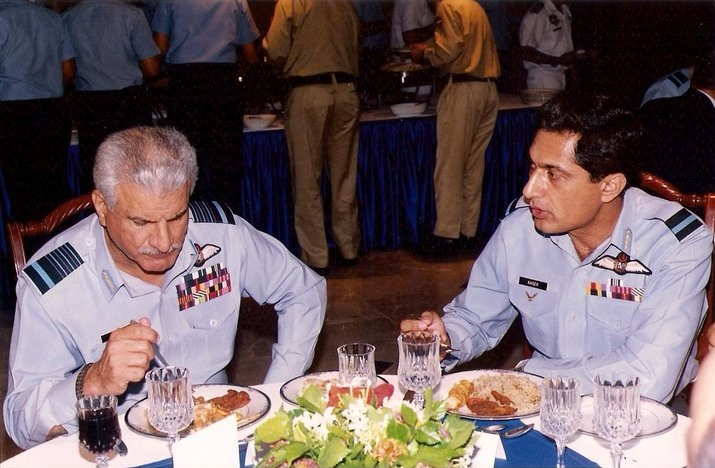
- Tufail (right) photographed with Air Chief Marshal Mushaf Ali Mir (left)
- Military career
- Allegiance: Pakistan
- Service branch: Pakistan Air Force
- Service years: 1975–2005
- Rank: Air Commodore
- Commands: No. 8 Squadron Haiders; No. 34 Flying Wing; Deputy Commandant, PAF Air War College; Base Commander, PAF Base Shahbaz; Base Commander, PAF Base Masroor
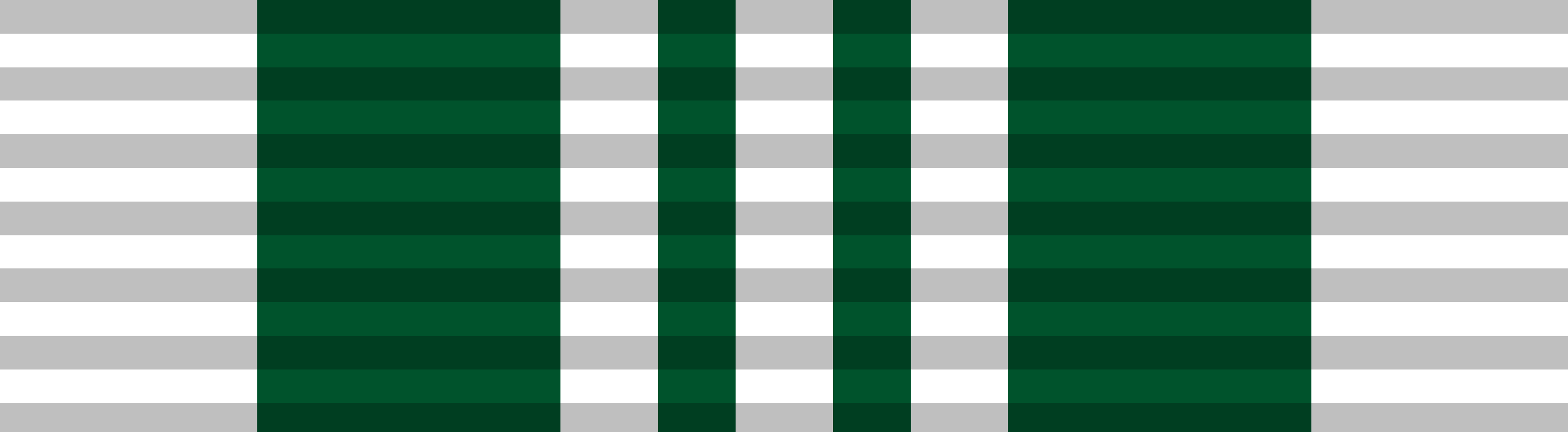
- Awards: Tamgha-i-Imtiaz (Military)
- Other work: Studies on history of aviation, archaeology, population genetics, Indus Valley civilization, etc.
- Website: Aeronaut; Footloose

Kaiser Tufail SI(M) is a retired Pakistani fighter pilot. Outside of his military service, Tufail is an active blogger, aviation historian and has delivered motivational speeches at TEDx conferences.

== Service ==
Kaiser Tufail was commissioned in 1975. After performing duties as a squadron pilot, he went on to command a fighter squadron (No.8 Tactical Attack Squadron equipped with Mirage 5) at PAF Base Masroor and a flying wing (No 34 Tactical Attack Wing) at PAF Base Rafiqui. Later he commanded PAF Base Shahbaz and PAF Base Masroor.

He has had the opportunity of flying virtually all types of trainers and fighters of the PAF during his service. These include T-6G Harvard, MFI-17 Mushaak, T-37, FT-5 (dual-seat MiG-17), F-6 (MiG-19), Mirage-III/5, F-16A/B Fighting Falcon, Mirage F-1E (Qatari AF), F-7P (MiG-21) and the F-7PG (F-7 double-delta variant).

Kaiser Tufail was the Director of Operations of the Pakistan Air Force (PAF) during the Kargil conflict. He served as Deputy Commandant and Commandant of the PAF Air War College. He also served as Senior Air Staff Officer (SASO) at the Southern Air Command before retiring in 2005.

Kaiser Tufail is a graduate of the PAF Air War College and the National Defence College (National Defence University) and holds master's degrees in Strategic Studies and War Studies.

== Works as an aviation historian ==
=== Books ===
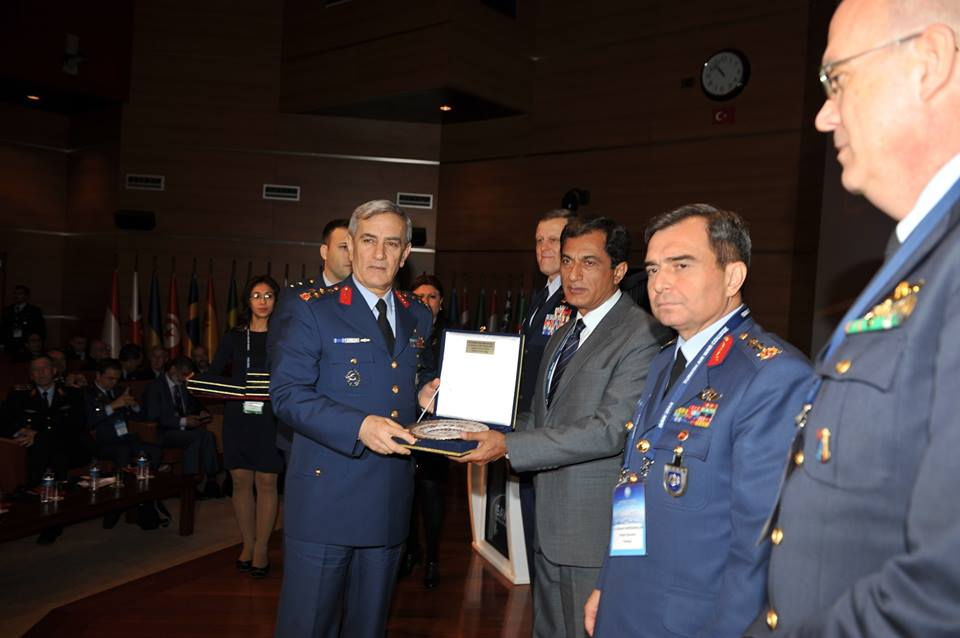
Tufail receiving a memento from the 30th Commander of the Turkish Air Force, Gen. Akın Öztürk at the Turkish Air War College in Istanbul (c. 2014)

- Great Air Battles of Pakistan Air Force
- In The Ring and On Its Feet

=== Articles ===
- "Jacobabad Tales"
- "Alam's Speed-shooting Classic"
- "Run ... it's a 104"
- "PAF on the Offensive – 1971 War"
- "The Gujarat Beechcraft Incident – 1965 War"
- "Air Defence in Northern Sector – 1971 War"
- "Air Support in Chamb – 1971 War"
- "Air Support in Shakargarh – 1971 War"
- "Air Support at Sea – 1971 War"
- "F-6s at War"
- "Air Support in Thar – 1971 War"
- "Mirages at War"
- "Kargil Conflict and Pakistan Air Force"
- "Shahbaz Over Golan"
- "It is the Man Behind the Gun"
- "A Hard Nut to Crack"
- "Cheapest Kill"
- "A Sword for Hussein"
- "Bo Kaata"
- "Mystery of the Downed Mystère"
- "Theirs But to Do and Die"

== Awards and decorations ==
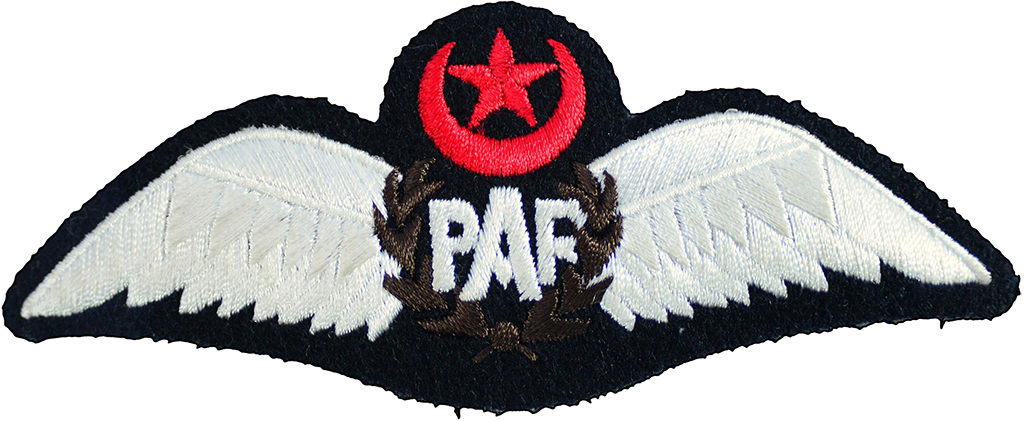

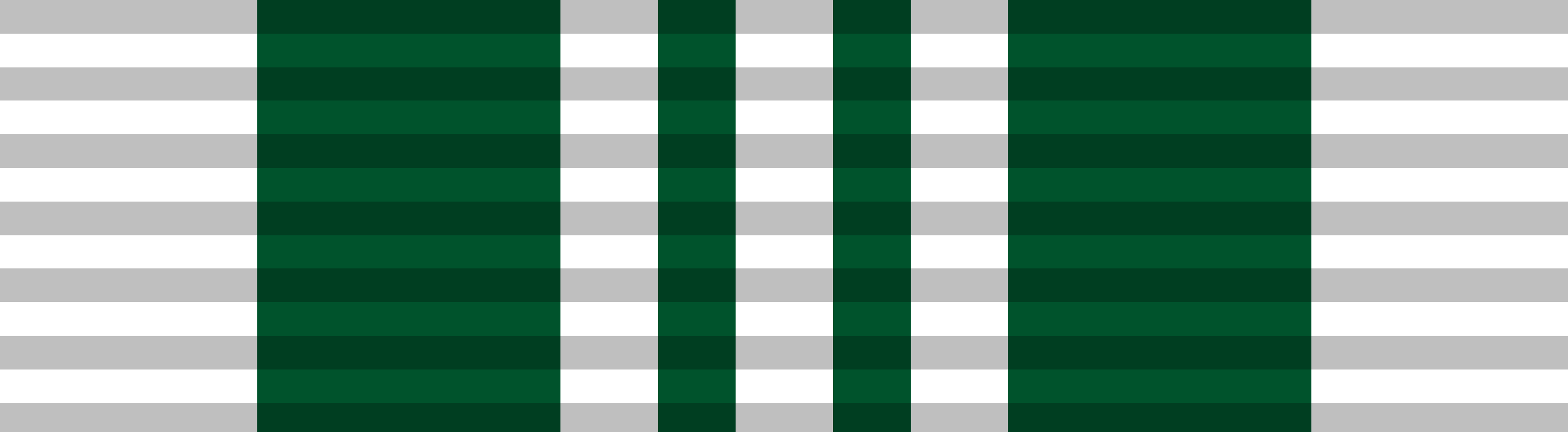

PAF GD(P) Badge RED (More than 3000 Flying Hours)
Tamgha-e-Imtiaz (Military) (Medal of Excellence)	Tamgha-e-Baqa (Nuclear Test Medal) 1998		Tamgha-e-Istaqlal Pakistan (Escalation with India Medal) 2002
10 Years Service Medal	20 Years Service Medal	30 Years Service Medal	Tamgha-e-Sad Saala Jashan-e- Wiladat-e-Quaid-e-Azam (100th Birth Anniversary of Muhammad Ali Jinnah) 1976
Hijri Tamgha (Hijri Medal) 1979	Jamhuriat Tamgha (Democracy Medal) 1988	Qarardad-e-Pakistan Tamgha (Resolution Day Golden Jubilee Medal) 1990	Tamgha-e-Salgirah Pakistan (Independence Day Golden Jubilee Medal) 1997
