= Rais Ahmad Rafi =

Pakistani Air Commodore (1933-2009)

Air Commodore Rais Ahmad Rafi SJ SI(M)
- رئیس احمد رفیع
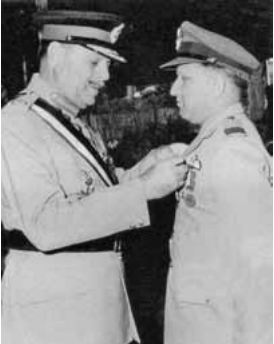
- Field Marshal Ayub Khan pins the Sitara-e-Jurat on Sqn/Ldr Rafi, 1966

Personal details
- Born: 13 December 1933 Jhelum, British India
- Died: 2 March 2009 (aged 75) Islamabad, Pakistan
- Spouse: Roohina Akhtar (m. 1958)
- Children: 4
- Relatives: Rizwan Ullah Khan (son-in-law)
- Education: RPAF College; Aligarh Muslim University; Government Gordon College; PAF Staff College

Military service
- Branch/service: Pakistan Air Force (1953-1968; 1969-1985); Iraqi Air Force (1968-1969)
- Years of service: 1953-1985
- Rank: Air Commodore
- Commands: PAF Base Korangi Creek; PAF Base Lower Topa; No. 8 Squadron PAF
- Battles/wars: Indo-Pakistani War of 1965; Indo-Pakistani Air War of 1965; Indo-Pakistani War of 1971

Rais Ahmad Rafi (Note: Urdu: رئیس احمد رفیع) (13 December 1933 — 2 March 2009) also known as Rais Rafi and Rais A. Rafi, was a former one-star rank officer of the Pakistan Air Force. As a squadron leader, he commanded the No. 8 Sqn in the Indo-Pakistani air war of 1965 and received the Sitara-e-Jurat for gallantry. He served as the Chief Investigator in the Civil Aviation Authority of Pakistan in the late 1980s.

== Early life ==
Rais Ahmad Rafi was born on 13 December 1933 in Jhelum. His father, Muhammad Ajaib, was an artillery officer in the British Indian Army and Pakistan Army, retiring as a Brigadier.

Rais enrolled into Muslim University High School Aligarh as a student of Class V in 1944. After the Partition of British India in August 1947, his father opted for Pakistan and was posted to the School of Artillery at Nowshera Cantonment.

Rafi was described as an exceptional hockey player and was selected for the Pakistan men's national field hockey team but focused on his pilot training.

== Personal life ==
Rafi married Roohina Akhtar in 1958. She was the daughter of Badshah Begum and Colonel Dr. Mohammad Sharif who was the Officer Commanding Combined Military Hospital in Mardan. Rafi and Roohnia had four children, two daughters: Samina (born in 1961 and married to Rizwan Ullah Khan) and Aisha (born in 1971), and two sons: Haroon (born 1962) and Umer (born 1968; a former PAF officer).

== Career in the Air Force ==
Rafi was selected for the RPAF College from Government Gordon College in 1951. He was commissioned into the Royal Pakistan Air Force (RPAF) as a fighter pilot on 2 October 1953.

From July 1961 to August 9, 1961, Flight Lieutenant Rafi and Flying Officer Hussain attended a flying safety course at the University of Southern California to train in United States Air Force procedures.

As a squadron leader, he commanded No. 8 Sqn from October 1964 to April 1968.

=== Sitara-e-Jurat ===
His Sitara-e-Jurat citation reads:

CITATION
SQUADRON LEADER RAIS AHMAD RAFI (PAK/1489)

"Squadron Leader Rais Ahmad Rafi flew a total of 14 operational missions during the Indo-Pakistan War. The officer led his Squadron on most of the hazardous missions to Ambala, Adampur, Jamnagar and Jodhpur. He completed all the missions assigned to him in a highly professional manner and in complete disregard to his personal safety. The officer was a source of inspiration for other pilots in the Sqn and set a fine example of courage, valour and determination. He invariably delivered his attacks with great accuracy and precision causing maximum damage to the enemy. For his courage and gallantry performance, Squadron Leader Rais Ahmed Rafi is awarded SJ."

=== Post-war ===
He was deputed to the Iraqi Air Force from April 1968 to 1969. Wing Commander Rafi commanded No. 31 Wing from June 1969 to May 1970. The Wing was disbanded and raised again in May 1983. He commanded the Primary Flying Training Wing from June 1971 to July 1972. He also commanded PAF Base Lower Topa, a non-flying base, from July 1972 to July 1973. He was promoted to temporary Group Captain on 10 February 1977. From June 1981 to December 1982, Air Commodore Rafi commanded PAF Base Korangi Creek. Thereafter, he served as the Pakistani air attaché to the Embassy of Pakistan, Washington, D.C.

== Later life and death ==
Rafi served as Chief Investigator at the Civil Aviation Authority of Pakistan in 1988.

Rais died on 2 March 2009 at his residence. He was buried at the graveyard in H-8, Islamabad.

== Awards and decorations ==
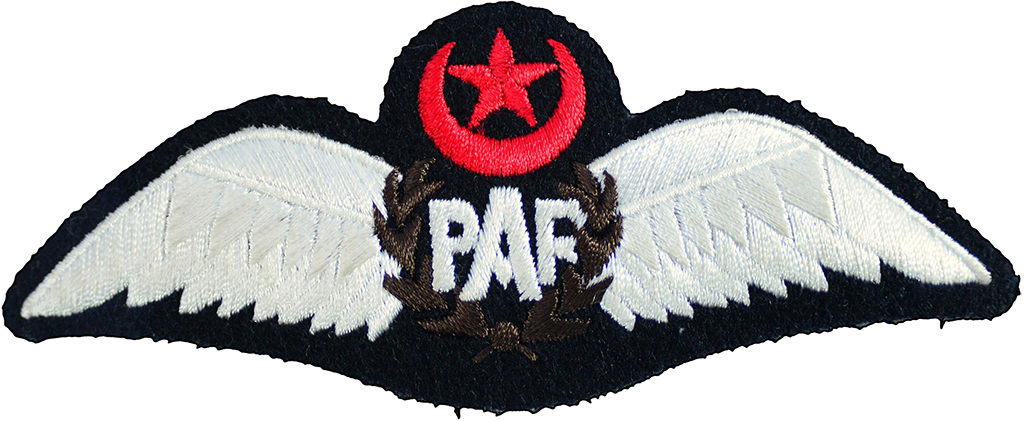

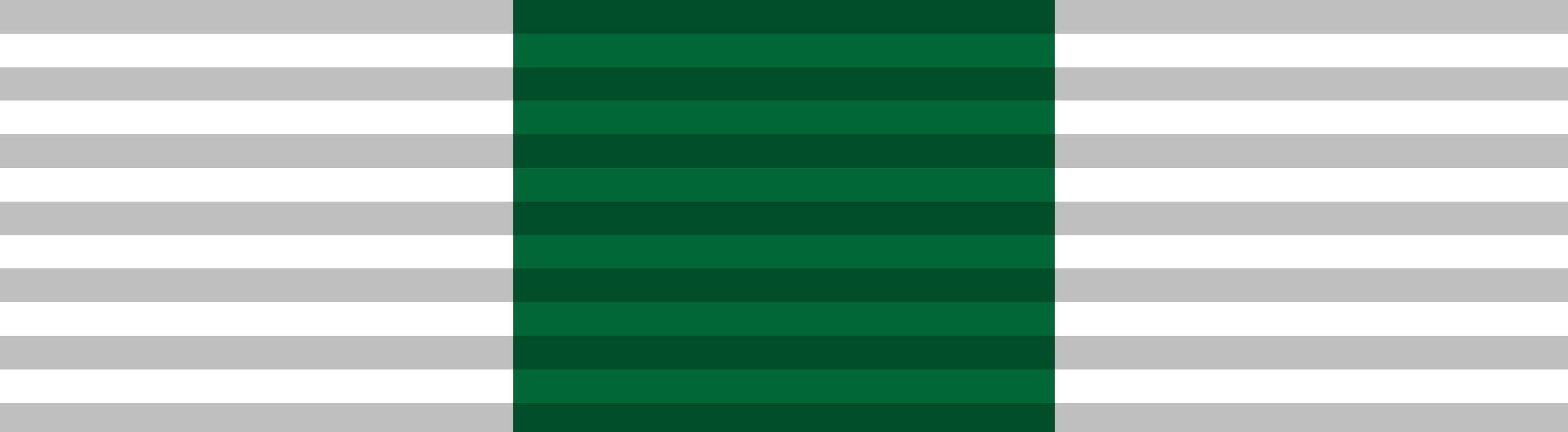

PAF GD(P) Badge RED (More than 3000 Flying Hours)
Sitara-e-Jurat (Star of Courage); 1965 War
Tamgha-e-Diffa (Defence Medal); 1. 1965 War Clasp; 2. 1971 War Clasp	Sitara-e-Harb 1965 War (War Star 1965)	Sitara-e-Harb 1971 War (War Star 1971)	Tamgha-e-Jang 1965 War (War Medal 1965)
Tamgha-e-Jang 1971 War (War Medal 1971)	Tamgha-e-Sad Saala Jashan-e-Wiladat-e-Quaid-e-Azam (100th Birth Anniversary of Muhammad Ali Jinnah); 1976	Tamgha-e-Qayam-e-Jamhuria (Republic Commemoration Medal); 1956	Hijri Tamgha (Hijri Medal); 1979
