= Bhairi Kalikathum =

Bhairi Kalikathum भैरी कालिकाथुम
- Village development committee
- Location in Nepal
- Coordinates: 28.93°N 81.63°E
- Country: Nepal
- Zone: Bheri Zone
- District: Dailekh District

Population (1991)
  - Total: 4,206
- Time zone: UTC+5:45 (Nepal Time)

Bhairi Kalikathum is a village development committee in Dailekh District in the Bheri Zone of western-central Nepal. At the time of the 1991 Nepal census, it had a population of 4206 people living in 773 individual households.
