= Kusapani =

Kusapani कुसापानी
- Village development committee
- Location in Nepal
- Coordinates: 29.00°N 81.64°E
- Country: Nepal
- Zone: Bheri Zone
- District: Dailekh District

Population (1991)
  - Total: 3,355
- Time zone: UTC+5:45 (Nepal Time)

Kusapani is a village development committee in Dailekh District in the Bheri Zone of western-central Nepal. At the time of the 1991 Nepal census it had a population of 3355 people living in 603 individual households.
