= No. 37 Squadron IAF =

No. 37 Squadron
- Active: 23 December 1957 – N/A
- Country: Republic of India
- Branch: Indian Air Force
- Role: Fighter
- Garrison/HQ: Jodhpur AFS
- Nickname: "Black Panthers"
- Mottos: Sadaiv Nirbhik; Fearless Forever

Aircraft flown
- Fighter: MiG-21 M

No. 37 Squadron (Black Panthers) is a fighter squadron and was equipped with MiG-21 M and based at Jodhpur Air Force Station.

== History ==
Formed on 23 December 1957 at Palam Air Force Station, No. 37 Squadron was equipped with Vampire NF54 night fighters, inheriting experienced personnel from No. 10 Squadron. The squadron played a pivotal role in the 1961 Annexation of Goa, conducting night reconnaissance missions over Dabolim and Daman. Despite facing challenges, including two fatal accidents in 1958, the squadron continued its operations until transitioning to Hawker Hunter aircraft in December 1962. The squadron's hunters particaapated in the Liberation of Goa in 1961.

During the Indo-Pakistani War of 1965, this Squadron was based at Chabua, when hostilities broke out. The Squadron was given the task of launching offensive action in the Eastern Sector and of providing air defence in the Western Sector.

The squadron was number plated on an unspecified date. Currently, only 4 MiG-21 Bison squadron remains in service.

=== Assignments ===
- Invasion of Goa in 1961
- Indo-Pakistani War of 1965
- Indo-Pakistani War of 1971

== Aircraft ==
Aircraft	From	To	Air Base
Vampire NF54	23 December 1957	December 1962	AFS Palam
Hawker Hunter MK 56	December 1962	March 1977	
MiG-21 M	March 1977	N/A	AFS Jodhpur
