= No. 16 Squadron IAF =

No. 16 Squadron Black Cobras
- Insignia of The No. 16 Squadron IAF "Cobras"
- Active: 1951 - Present
- Country: Republic of India
- Allegiance: Indian Armed Forces
- Branch: Indian Air Force
- Role: Interdiction
- Part of: Central Air Command (India)
- Garrison/HQ: Gorakhpur AFS
- Nickname: "Cobras"
- Mottos: Praharodata; Ready to Strike
- Mascot: Coiled Cobra

Insignia
- Identification symbol: Coiled Cobra

Aircraft flown
- Attack: SEPECAT Jaguar IB/IS

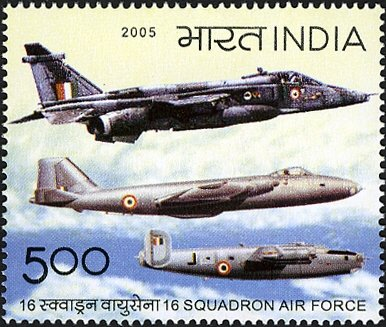
2005 stamp to commemorate 50 years of service

No. 16 Squadron Indian Air Force nicknamed as Black Cobras, is a counter-air and interdiction unit, operating out of the Indian Air Force station in Gorakhpur.

In 2001, the squadron was operating SEPECAT Jaguar IS and IB fighter jets. The squadron started using them in October 1986, and was still using them as of 2001.

== History ==
Raised in September 1951 at Pune, No. 16 Squadron of the Indian Air Force was one of four new squadrons established as part of a rapid-response expansion of the Indian Air Force. The squadron began flying Tempest initially for a few years.

The squadron was re-equipped in 1954, with B-24 Liberators. Its role was also changed to heavy bombing. In 1957, the squadron received English Electric Canberras, and was moved to Kalaikunda. During Operation Vijay, eight bombers from the No.16 Squadron led by Wg. Cdr. Surinder Singh dropped bombs over the runway at Dabolim Airfield. The squadron also flew a few raids in Diu.

During the Indo-Pakistani War of 1965, the squadron flew several sorties and strike missions.

During the War of 1971, the squadron was involved in many missions under the command of Commander P. Gautam (MVC, Bar to VM).

In October–December 1986, the squadron was re-equipped with SEPECAT Jaguars, which are deep penetration strike aircraft. The squadron's current roles are identified as counter-air and interdiction.

== Aircraft ==
Aircraft types operated by the squadron

Aircraft type	From	To	Air base
Harvard IIB	February 1950	February 195	AFS Pune
Hawker Tempest II	February 1950	February 195	AFS Pune
Consolidated B-24 Liberator	October 1954	July 1956	AFS Pune
English Electric Canberra B(I).58	December 1957	October 1986	AFS Kalaikunda
SEPECAT Jaguar IS	November 1986	Present	AFS Gorakhpur

=== Awards ===
- Wg Cdr Padmanabha Gautam GDP, MVC
- JWO Kuthukallunkal Krishnan Raju Eng/Fit, CAS Commendation
- Air Cmde William George Beddoe GDP, Vayu Sena Medal, CAS Commendation
