= Patrick Desmond Callaghan =

Pakistani Air Commodore (1926–1992)

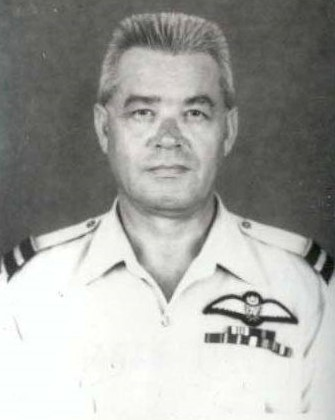
- Official military portrait c. 1971
- Nickname: P.D. Callaghan
- Born: Patrick Desmond Callaghan; 16 July 1926; Lahore, Punjab, British India
- Died: 6 April 1992 (aged 65)
- Allegiance: Pakistan
- Branch: Royal Indian Air Force (1945–1947); Pakistan Air Force (1947–1976)
- Service years: 1945—1976
- Rank: Air Vice Marshal
- Commands: Chief Ins. Aviation Safety
- Conflicts: World War II; Indo-Pakistani War of 1965; Indo-Pakistani War of 1971
- Other work: Flight safety instructor at the Pakistan International Airlines

Patrick Desmond Callaghan (16 July 1926 – 6 April 1992) was a Pakistani air marshal of the two-star rank in the Pakistan Air Force who is credited for his pioneering work in flight safety in Pakistan and his role during the Indo-Pakistani War of 1971.

== Military career ==
=== Early career ===
Patrick Desmond Callaghan was born on 16 July 1926. He was commissioned into the Royal Indian Air Force (RIAF) as a pilot officer on 17 September 1945.

Early in his commissioned service, he was posted to the RIAF base at Kohat in 1946. He flew a variety of aircraft including Spitfires. In 1946, Callaghan belly landed his aircraft at Kohat airfield. The aircraft's engine had caught fire after an oil leak during landing practice. The aircraft was later written off in 1947.

=== Pakistan Airforce ===
At the Partition of India in August 1947, he opted to serve with the Pakistan Air Force (PAF), and later married Maureen Viegas, whose sister, Jeanne, would later marry Mervyn Middlecoat, who went on to command the PAF's famed No. 9 Squadron and become a hero of the PAF. On 1 September 1951 a PAF two-seater Fury aircraft caught fire. Flight Lieutenant Callaghan was the second pilot on that flight.

One of the pioneer officers of the PAF, Callaghan served for a number of the early years of the PAF as a flight instructor at Risalpur, where he helped to train many of the PAF's future leaders and top fighter and bomber pilots (including his brother-in-law by marriage, Mervyn Middlecoat).

During the Indo-Pakistani War of 1965, although a "desk jockey" in Peshawar, he volunteered for and flew dangerous low, low-level, night-time strafing missions in old Harvards along the Grand Trunk Road between Lahore and Amritsar harassing Indian Army convoys.

Years later, as a group captain, he led the PAF team that investigated the crash of a PAF C-130 after it went missing while returning to Pakistan from China. This investigation was conducted at high altitude in mountainous country and was particularly trying and hazardous. In the early 1960s, then-Wing Commander Callaghan served as the head of the PAF) Accident Investigation Team. He led high-profile investigations into aircraft losses.

By 1969 he had risen through the ranks of squadron leader and wing commander, working in staff jobs in Kohat and Peshawar, after earlier being based at Mauripur.

During the 1971 war in West Pakistan, Air Commodore Callaghan led a team tasked with verifying all enemy aircraft downing claims through physical wreckage inspection, location confirmation, and witness accounts. He was Assisted by US Defence Attaché Brigadier General Charles "Chuck" Yeager (the first man to break the sound barrier), and the team enforced a stringent film assessment protocol, creating an unprecedentedly elaborate corroborative system in aerial warfare history.

Callaghan was noted for his hardwork and dedication during this time. In the prelude to the Indo-Pakistani war of 1971, Callaghan was promoted to the rank of Air Vice Marshal and appointed as the Deputy Chief of Air Staff of the Pakistan Air Force.

During the Indo-Pakistani War of 1971, he was deployed to East Pakistan, where he served as the Chief of Staff of the Eastern Air Force Command. In this capacity, he oversaw air operations in the region. Notably, on 16 December 1971, Air Vice Marshal Callaghan was present at the Ramna Race Course in Dhaka and was one of the signatories of the Pakistani Instrument of Surrender.

After his repatriation to Pakistan, Callaghan retired from the PAF in 1976, Air Commodore Callaghan headed the Air Safety Branch of the Department of Civil Aviation and his internationally recognized expertise in investigating and solving the causes of air crashes led to his call out by a number of Arab countries to help them solve a number of crashes in their countries.

Callaghan died in April 1992 at the age of 65.
