= Rawalkot =

Coordinates: 28°53′N 81°38′E

Rawotkot रावतकोट
- Village development committee
- Interactive map of Rawotkot
- Country: Nepal
- Zone: Bheri Zone
- District: Dailekh District

Population (1991)
  - Total: 4,037
- Time zone: UTC+5:45 (Nepal Time)

Rawotkot is a village development committee in Dailekh District in the Bheri Zone of western-central Nepal. At the time of the 1991 Nepal census it had a population of 4037 people living in 769 individual households.
