= Peter Christy =

Pakistani B-57 WSO who disappeared

Squadron Leader Peter Christy
- Squadron Leader Peter Christy, 1965.
- Born: 1937; Karachi, British India
- Died: 6 December 1971 (Death unconfirmed officially); 60 km away from Jamnagar, India (Assumed dead)
- Military career
- Allegiance: Pakistan
- Branch: Pakistan Air Force
- Service years: 1958–1971
- Rank: Squadron Leader
- Nickname: Fire Master
- Unit: No. 7 Squadron Bandits
- Conflicts: Indo-Pakistani War of 1965; Indo-Pakistani War of 1971 †
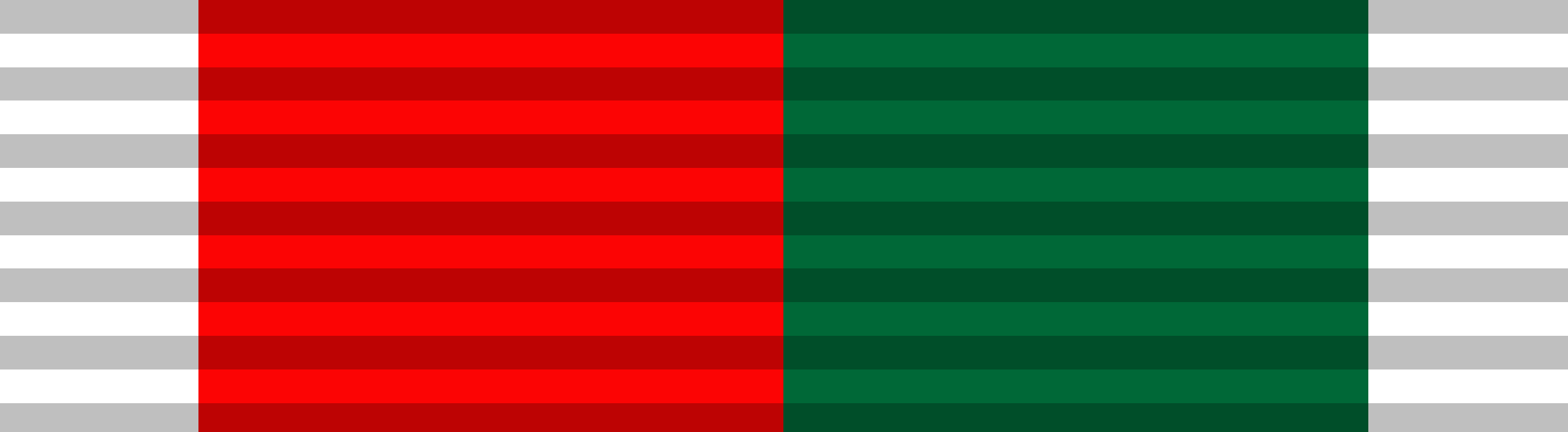
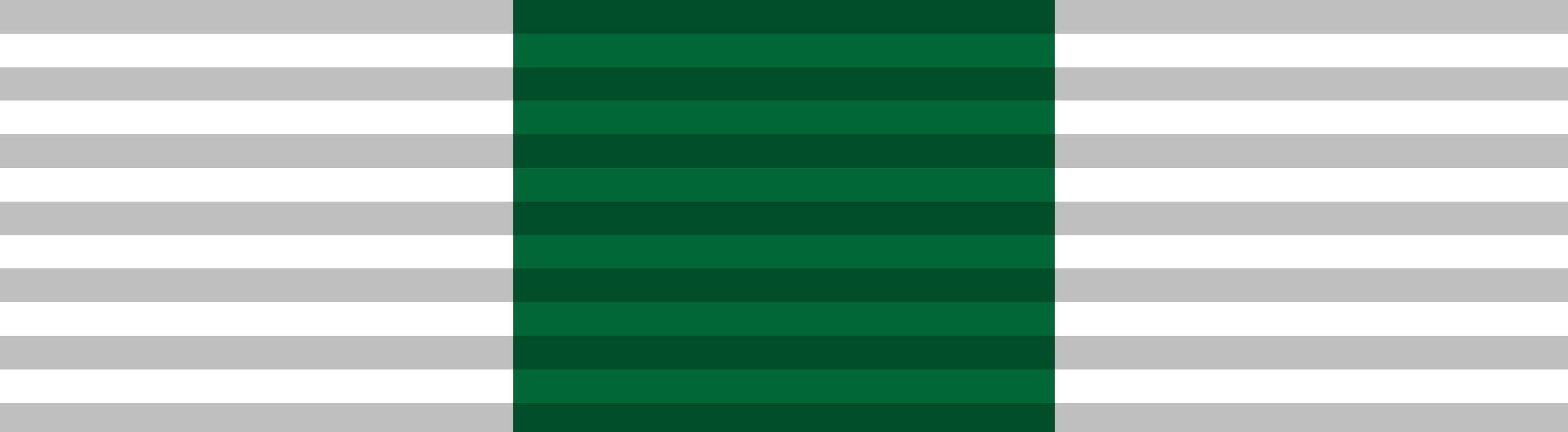
- Awards: Tamgha-i-Jurat (1965) Sitara-i-Jurat (1971)

Peter Christy (1937 – 6 December 1971), SJ, was a PAF bomber pilot and weapon systems officer (WSO). A B-57 Canberra navigator, Christy was officially missing in action in December 1971, and is presumed dead by the Pakistan Armed Forces. He was posthumously honored by the Pakistani government with the Sitara-e-Jurat in 1971.

== Education ==
Christy was born in Karachi then-British India in 1937. His father was Maula Bakhsh Christy. He attended St Patrick's High School, Karachi. His teachers described him as an intelligent student, and he scored well in his matriculation. He was a Christian.

== Career ==
In 1962, Christy joined the Pakistan Air Force as a flying officer. He attained the ranks of flight officer and then flight lieutenant. After flying as a B-57 Canberra navigator in the Indo-Pakistani War of 1965, he became a squadron leader in 1968.

By 1971, Christy had begun working for Pakistan International Airlines (PIA). He left in December 1971 to volunteer to fight in the Indo-Pakistani war of 1971. He was assigned the role of navigator and, on December 6, tasked with bombing Jamnagar. He did not return from the mission and on December 8 was declared missing in action.

== Aftermath ==
The Government of Pakistan posthumously awarded him the third highest military award, the Sitara-e-Jurat (Star of Courage), in 1971. According to the IAF, Christy was killed in action when plane was shot down IAF's anti-aircraft artillery. However, India's Ministry of External Affairs declined to comment. On 6 September 2004, Christy was honoured by the Pakistan Television (PTV) in a program sponsored by the Inter Services Public Relations (ISPR).

== See also ==
- List of people who disappeared
- 8-Pass Charlie
- Saiful Azam
- Sarfaraz Ahmed Rafiqui
- Mervyn Middlecoat
- Muhammad Mahmood Alam
- Marium Mukhtiar
- Ayesha Farooq
