= Glenn L. Martin Maryland Aviation Museum =

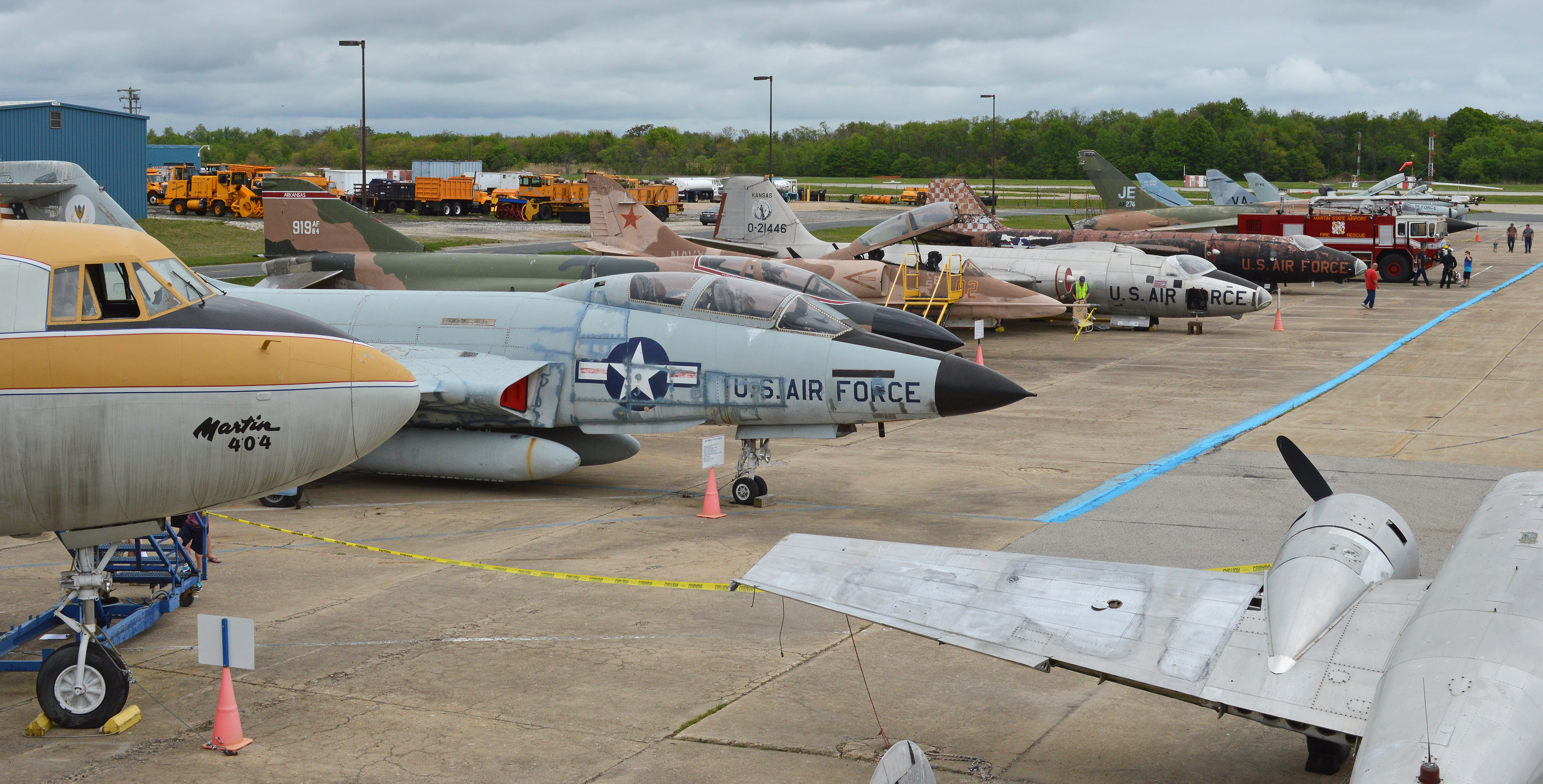
- The Strawberry Point Flightline at the museum, where all of its aircraft are displayed

- Location within Maryland Location within the United States
- Former name: Glenn L. Martin Aviation Museum
- Established: 1990
- Location: Middle River, Maryland
- Coordinates: 39.3279°N 76.4220°W
- Type: Aviation museum
- Founders: Gene DiGennaro; Stan Piet; Bryan Williman
- Website: www.mdairmuseum.org

The Glenn L. Martin Maryland Aviation Museum is an aviation museum located at Martin State Airport in Middle River, Maryland. It is focused on the history of aviation in Maryland including the Glenn L. Martin Company and Lockheed Martin.

The aircraft currently on display are on loan from the Navy and Army, with the exception of the Martin 4-0-4, which was donated to the museum in 1999.

== History ==
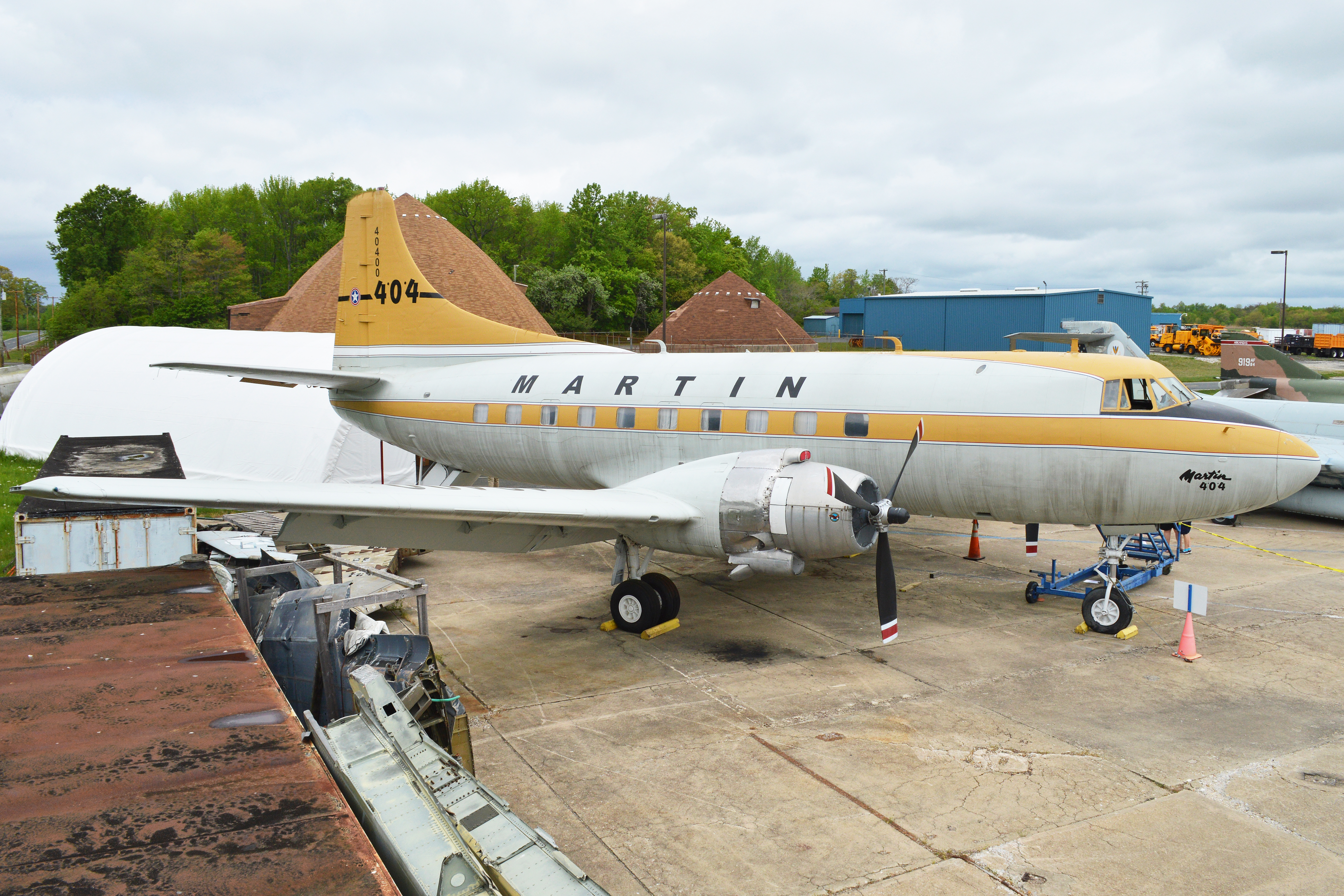
A Martin 4-0-4 painted to represent the prototype Martin 4-0-4, a converted Martin 2-0-2

The Glenn L. Martin Aviation Museum was founded in 1990. As part of preparations for the nascent museum, two RB-57s were acquired from the Aberdeen Proving Ground, where they had been used as targets. After an initial attempt was postponed due to fog, the aircraft were airlifted to the museum on 28 May 1992. The museum opened at Martin State Airport on 11 June 1993.

A Martin 404 was flown to the museum on 27 May 2000. (Note: It was purchased from a man named Manfred Leuthard in California, who had intended to use it for sightseeing flights.)

By 2003, increased attendance led the museum to seek a larger facility. At the same time, it was renamed the Glenn L. Martin Maryland Aviation Museum to reflect an expanded focus. By 2006, it was considering options to bring the aircraft inside and consolidate various facilities at one location. The following year it mounted an effort to purchase one of the two surviving Martin Mars flying boats.

The museum acquired a T-34C in 2013.

By 2017, the museum began an increased focus on STEM education. This was followed by renovations to many of its exhibits in 2018, which included replacing older displays with digital equipment.

A bond issue was proposed in 2023 to support the renovation of the former Lockheed Martin building at 2323 Eastern Drive as a new location for the museum. The building was acquired by the Maryland Aviation Administration in March 2025 with view toward leasing it to the museum. The 100,000 sq ft (9,300 m^{2}), five-floor building is significantly larger than the museum's existing location and will be called the Maryland Aerospace Heritage Center.

== Facilities ==
The main portion of the museum is located in Hangar 5, while the aircraft are kept at the "Flight Line" at Strawberry Point near the end of the runway.

The museum holds an archival collection of over 200,000 photographs, 2,500 film reels and other materials. The vast majority of the collection was acquired from Martin-Marietta around 1992, shortly before it was to be thrown out.

== Exhibits ==
The history of the Martin Corporation is told with displays of models, films, photographs and documents from the museum's large archive.

Exhibits include They Answered the Call, about workers at the Martin company during World War II.

== Collection ==
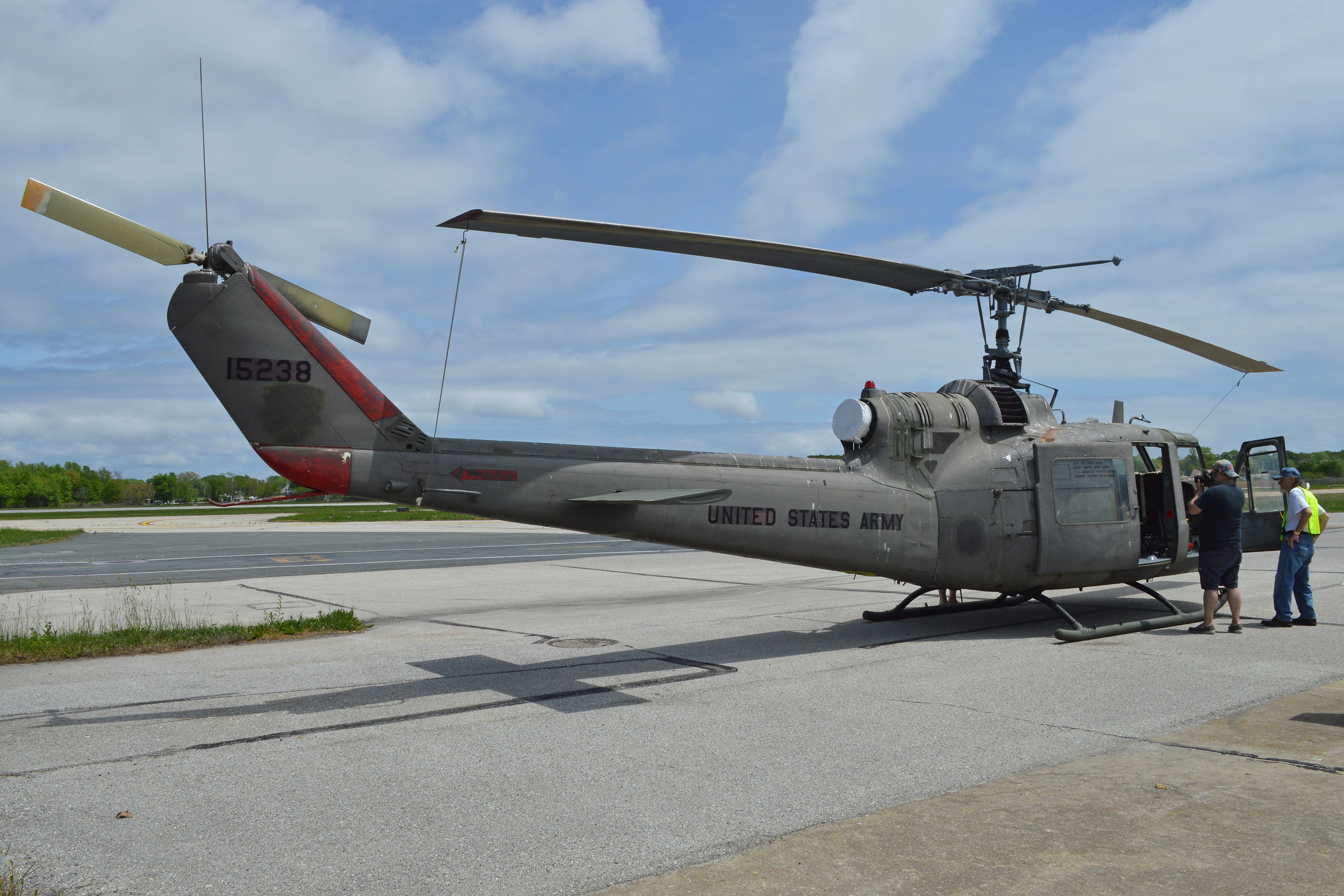
Bell UH-1M Iroquois at the museum

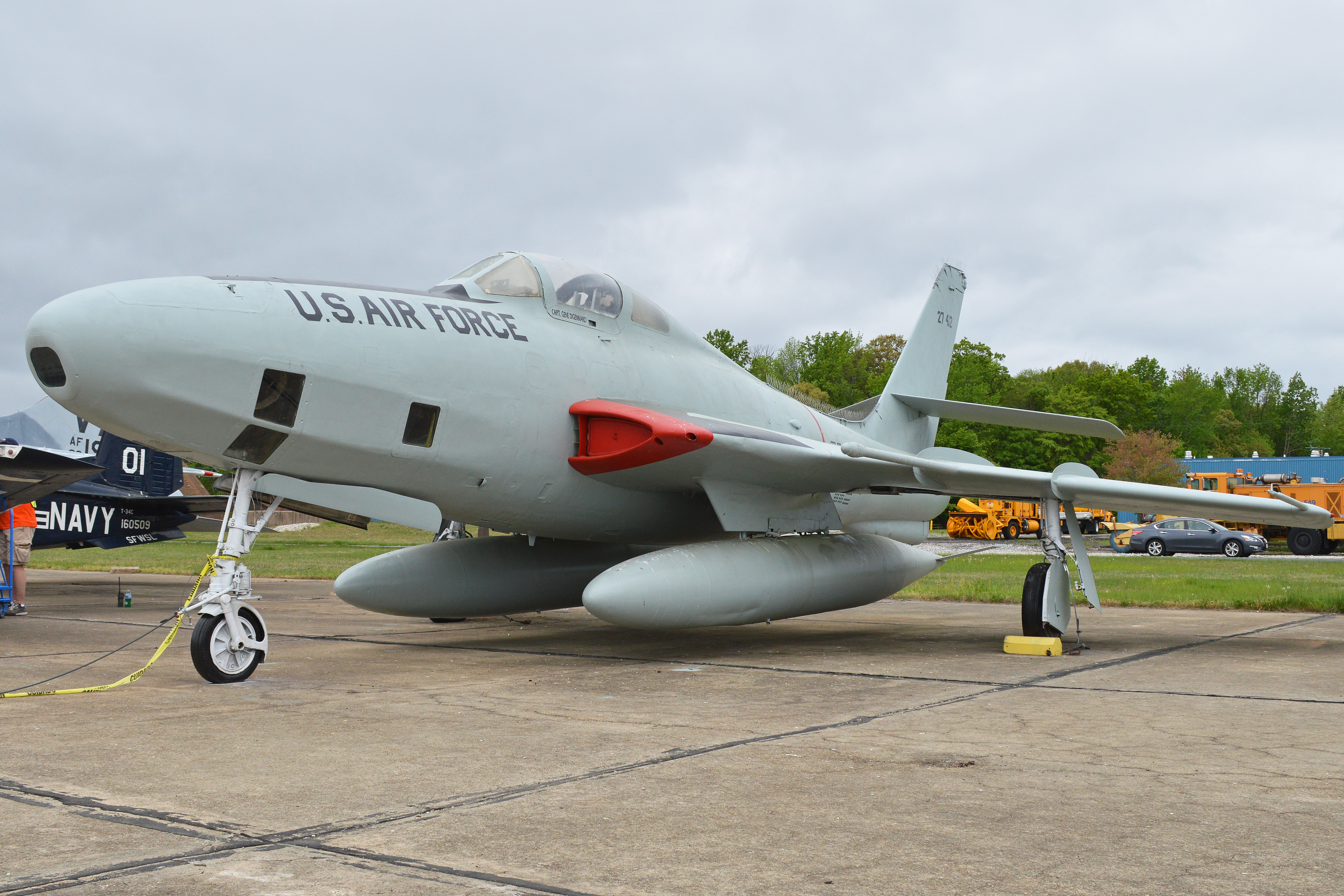
Republic RF-84F Thunderstreak at the museum

=== Aircraft on display ===
- Beechcraft 18S
- Beechcraft T-34C Mentor
- Bell AH-1S Cobra
- Bell UH-1M Iroquois
- Douglas TA-4J Skyhawk
- Forney F-1
- Lockheed T-33
- LTV A-7D Corsair II
- North American F-100F Super Sabre
- North American F-100F Super Sabre
- Martin 4-0-4
- Martin RB-57A Canberra
- Martin RB-57A Canberra
- McDonnell F-4C Phantom II
- McDonnell F-101B Voodoo
- Republic RF-84F Thunderflash
- Republic F-105G Thunderchief

=== Aircraft in storage ===
- Grumman F-9F Cougar
- Aft fuselage and tail of a Martin P6M SeaMaster jet flying boat
- Two Martin AM Mauler aircraft under restoration

== Events ==
The museum holds an annual Holiday Plane and Train Garden made up of a model railroad layout. It also holds an annual Rosie the Riveter Day in August.

== Programs ==
The museum periodically offers open cockpit days.

It began offering a STEM education program called "B-26 Assembly Team" in 2016, in which students assemble a replica Martin B-26 Marauder.

== See also ==
- List of aerospace museums
