= Martin B-57 Canberra =

US license-built version of the British English Electric Canberra bomber

B-57 Canberra
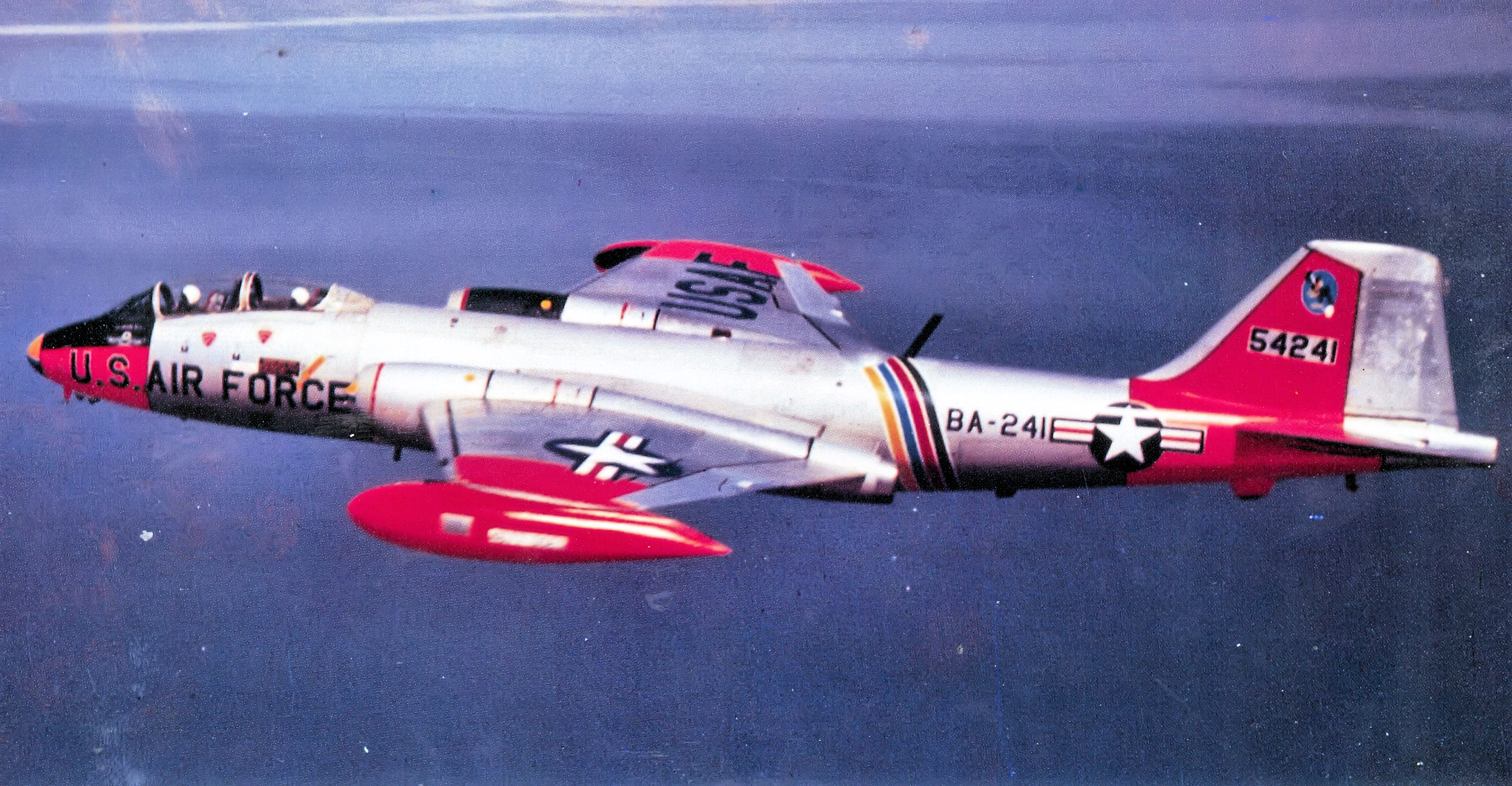
- A US Air Force B-57E in flight over the Great Salt Lake, Utah in 1970

General information
- Type: Tactical bomber
- Manufacturer: Martin
- Status: Retired from military service; 2 in use by NASA (2 operational, 1 damaged)
- Primary users: United States Air Force Pakistan Air Force; Republic of China Air Force; Republic of Vietnam Air Force
- Number built: 403

History
- Introduction date: 1954
- First flight: 20 July 1953
- Retired: 1983 (USAF); 1985 (Pakistan)
- Developed from: English Electric Canberra
- Variants: Martin RB-57D Canberra; Martin/General Dynamics RB-57F Canberra

The Martin B-57 Canberra is an American-built, twin-engined tactical bomber and reconnaissance aircraft that entered service with the United States Air Force (USAF) in 1953. The B-57 is a license-built version of the British English Electric Canberra, manufactured by the Glenn L. Martin Company. Initial Martin-built models were virtually identical to their British-built twinjet counterparts; Martin later modified the design to incorporate larger quantities of US-sourced components and produced the aircraft in several variants.

The B-57 Canberra holds the distinction of being the first jet bomber in U.S. service to drop bombs during combat. The Canberra was used extensively during the Vietnam War in a bombing capacity; specialized versions of the type were also produced and served as high-altitude aerial reconnaissance platforms (the Martin RB-57D Canberra), and as electronic warfare aircraft. The B-57 Canberra was also sold to export customers abroad; further combat use was seen by the Pakistani Air Force during the Indo-Pakistani War of 1965 and the Indo-Pakistani War of 1971.

In 1983, the USAF opted to retire the type; the B-57 Canberra's retirement marked the ending of the era of the tactical bomber. The three remaining flightworthy WB-57Fs are technically assigned to the NASA Johnson Space Center, next to Ellington Field in Houston, as high-altitude scientific research aircraft but have also been used for testing and electronic communications in the United States and Afghanistan.

== Development ==
=== Origins ===
At the outbreak of the Korean War in 1950, the USAF found itself in dire need of an all-weather interdiction aircraft. The existing inventory of piston-engined Douglas B-26 Invaders had been dispatched in this capacity at the very start of the conflict; within a few months in the theatre, the B-26 had suffered a very high rate of attrition and successes with the type were typically limited. The USAF requested that the British government provide a private demonstration of the English Electric Canberra, a newly developed jet-powered bomber. On 17 August 1950, the Canberra demonstration was performed at RAF Burtonwood in Warrington, Cheshire, England; during the following month, a team of US test pilots and engineers visited English Electric's Warton factory to perform a series of flight tests and a detailed technical assessment of the aircraft.

On 16 September 1950, the USAF formally issued a request for a jet-powered bomber; the sought aircraft had to possess a top speed of 630 mph (1,010 km/h), ceiling of 40,000 ft (12,000 m), and range of 1,150 mi (1,850 km). Full all-weather capability and a secondary reconnaissance role also had to be included in the design. The American contenders included the Martin XB-51, the North American B-45 Tornado and AJ Savage. To expedite the process, only projects based on existing aircraft were considered and unusually, the service considered foreign aircraft. These included the Canadian Avro Canada CF-100 and the Canberra, which had not yet officially entered service with the Royal Air Force (RAF). Aviation authors Bill Gunston and Peter Gilchrist commented that "It seems likely that this first batch of trials convinced the Americans that the Canberra was ideal for the job, but in order to satisfy the US Senate a competitive evaluation of all likely contenders had to be arranged".

As part of the USAF's evaluation process, all five aircraft were submitted to a series of fly-offs to determine their performance. On 21 February 1951, a Canberra B.2 (WD932), flown by Roland Beamont, made the transatlantic journey, arriving in the United States to participate in the competition; by making this journey, the Canberra became the first jet aircraft to perform a non-stop unrefueled flight across the Atlantic Ocean, travelling from Warton, England, to Gander, Newfoundland, Canada, in the record time of 4 hours 37 minutes. On 26 February 1951, the flyoff took place at Andrews Field, Prince George's County, Maryland; each aircraft was tasked with performing a set sequence of maneuvers within a ten-minute window, directly demonstrating its agility and performance against its rivals. According to Gunston and Gilchrist, the Canberra proved to be significantly superior to any of the competing aircraft, and its selection was beyond doubt by the end of the competition.

=== Production arrangements ===
The Canberra was a foreign aircraft, which meant its superiority in terms of performance did not guarantee political support in spite of the urgent need, particularly in light of there being several rival indigenous aircraft designs. There were also doubts about production availability with English Electric being able to mesh with USAF demands, as well as questions over spare parts. In March 1951, many of these questions were answered; with production lines already at full capacity meeting Royal Air Force orders and those emerging from other export customers, English Electric entered into discussions with Glenn L. Martin Company. It was proposed that Martin would receive a license to build the Canberra in the United States. According to Gunston and Gilchrist, the Americanization of the Canberra program proved effective at dismissing much of the political opposition to the project.

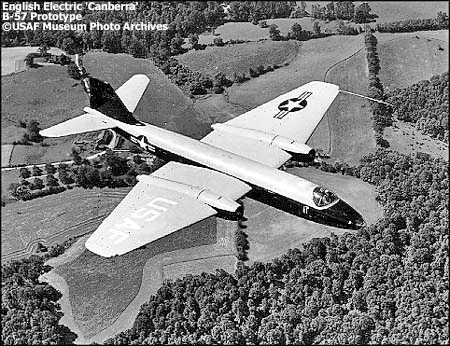
The British-built Canberra B.2 that was used as a pattern and prototype for the B-57

On 23 March 1951, the USAF issued a contract to Martin, requesting the manufacturing of an initial quantity of 250 Canberras, which had received the USAF designation B-57A (Martin internally designated the type as the Model 272). On 3 April 1951, English Electric and Martin both signed a formal licensing agreement to cover the Canberra's production.

During August 1951, a second British-built Canberra (WD940) was flown to the US to act as a pattern aircraft for Martin, as well as to perform assorted trials and to support performance validation of airframe changes. On 21 December 1951, one of the British pattern aircraft (WD932) was lost in an accident; although this was subsequently discovered to be caused by incorrect fuel scheduling having led to the tail-heavy aircraft exceeding its design limits during a maneuver, the crash jeopardized the entire program and invigorated the anti-Canberra political opposition. The crash did lead to some design changes in the face of political pressure, but these were not implemented on the first 75 aircraft to be produced.

Due to the great urgency placed on delivering the B-57A Canberra, the initial phase of manufacturing performed by Martin used a minimum-change formula to expedite production; thus the first B-57As to be produced were largely identical to the Canberra B.2. As such, more than 30 changes that had been requested by the Wright Air Development Center (WADC) were rejected on program schedule or cost grounds. One noticeable exception was the adoption of more powerful Armstrong Siddeley Sapphire engines capable of producing 7,200 lbf (32 kN) of thrust, which were license-built in the United States as the Wright J65. The Sapphire-based J65 powerplant had been selected in place of the British-built Canberra's Rolls-Royce Avons as the USAF had placed an emphasis on operations within hot climates and intended to fly at a slightly higher maximum gross weight than the RAF's operating practices.

Several other minor differences were also present between early US-built and UK-built Canberras. These changes included the canopy and fuselage windows being slightly revised, the crew being reduced from three to two, the adoption of wingtip fuel tanks, engine nacelles were modified with additional cooling scoops, and the conventional "clamshell" bomb bay doors were replaced with a low-drag rotating door originally designed for the XB-51. As a result of these changes, the bomb bay of the US-built aircraft was slightly smaller than its UK-built counterparts in order to allow the American aircraft to carry more fuel; however, the overall external shape of the Canberra remained unchanged.

In early July 1953, the first US-built production aircraft (52–1418) rolled out; it conducted its maiden flight on 20 July 1953. One month later, this initial production aircraft was accepted by the USAF, by which point a cessation of hostilities had come into effect in Korea. This was one of only eight B-57A Canberras to be manufactured; the remaining 67 aircraft from this first batch, deemed no longer to be required as bombers, were converted on the assembly line to serve as medium-altitude reconnaissance aircraft while retaining all the basic Canberra features, and were accordingly re-designated as the RB-57A Canberra.

=== Further development ===
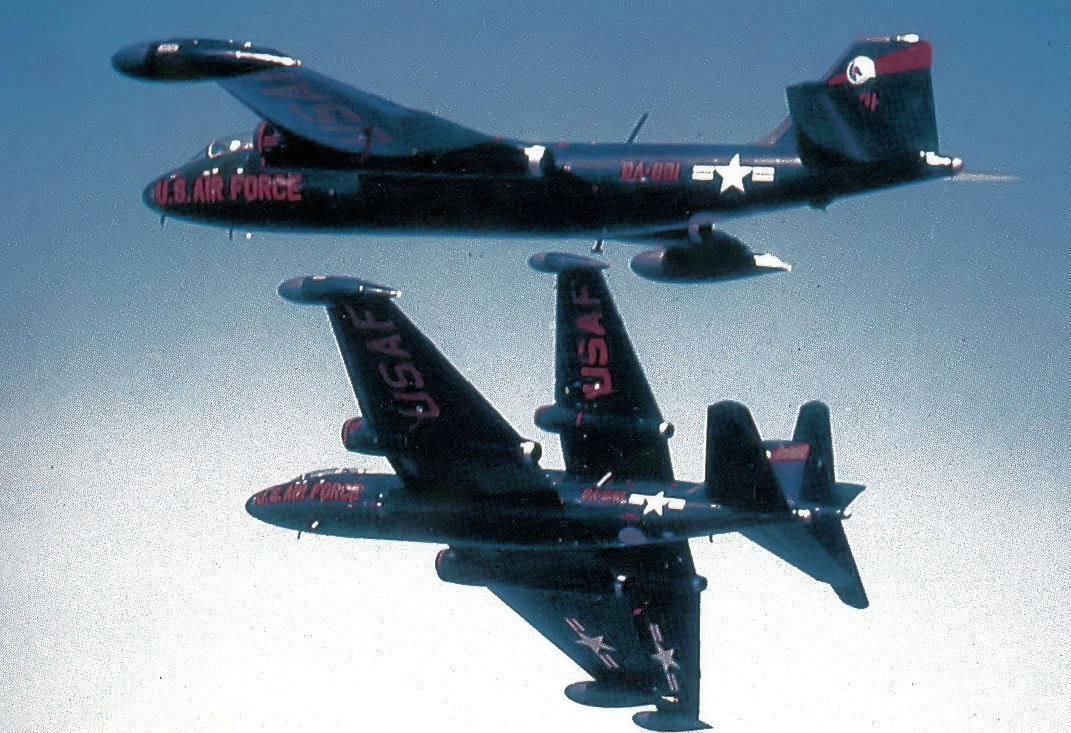
B-57B Canberras of the 345th Bombardment Wing in flight, 1957

In place of the curtailed B-57A, a more refined bomber variant, the B-57B, was developed. Having a more lengthy development time, this model incorporated the structural and system changes that had been recommended by WADC, which resulted in the aircraft being more adaptable than its B-57A predecessor. Of the external changes, the most significant was the adoption of a fighter-style canopy accompanied by a flat-panel windshield and a tandem seating arrangement, providing for greater transparency and an improved view for both the pilot and navigator, as well as allowing it to be equipped with a gunsight. The corresponding glazed bombing nose of the B-57A was deleted along with the starboard crew entrance to the cockpit.

The B-57B introduced several other major changes. In terms of armaments, a total of four hardpoints attached to the outer wing panels were installed on this variant, capable of mounting external bombs and rockets. The B-57B was also furnished with a gun armament for strafing attacks. The first 90 aircraft to be produced were equipped with a total of eight 0.50 cal (12.7 mm) Browning machine guns installed within the wings; on later aircraft these were replaced by an arrangement of four 20 mm M39 cannon. A new rotary bomb door was adopted on the B-57B, which had originally been designed for the XB-51, replacing the hinged doors; this proved to be faster to open/close and reduced buffeting, which in turn improved accuracy and allowed for faster attack speeds. The redesigned bomb bay also enabled faster turnaround times on the ground.

In addition, hydraulically-operated triangular air brakes were installed on the rear fuselage, which worked in addition to the existing 'finger'-type brakes installed in the wings; the new brakes gave the pilots a greater level of controllability, improving the accuracy of low-level bombing runs. The B-57B was equipped with an APW-11 Bombing Air Radar Guidance System for target approach guidance, as well as an APS-54 radar warning receiver. The engines were also furnished with a new cartridge starting system, eliminating the reliance on ground start carts.

The substantial design changes between the B-57A and B-57B models resulted in delays to the overall program, as well as incurring substantial costs on the fixed-price contract. Gunston and Gilchrist stated of the consequences to the program: "This was clearly not the manufacturer's fault, but the money effectively ran out after 177 of the planned 250-aircraft order had been completed". In 1954, in response to the sound performance offered by the B-57B, the USAF elected to place a large second order; this included a further 100 B-57B bombers, 38 B-57C trainers, and 20 RB-57D high-altitude reconnaissance aircraft. In 1955, a final batch of 68 B-57E target tugs was ordered.

In 1969, in response to demands for a capable night interdiction aircraft for combat operations in Southeast Asia, a total of 16 B-57B Canberras were substantially rebuilt during a lengthy upgrade program. These aircraft received an entirely new nose section containing an AN/ANQ-139 forward-looking radar, a low-light television system, and an AN/AAS-26 forward-looking infrared detector. A laser rangefinder/designator was also installed, and the wing pylons modified to accommodate laser-guided Paveway bombs, while all the guns were removed to save weight. During the production run from 1953 to 1957, a total of 403 B-57s were built.

== Operational history ==
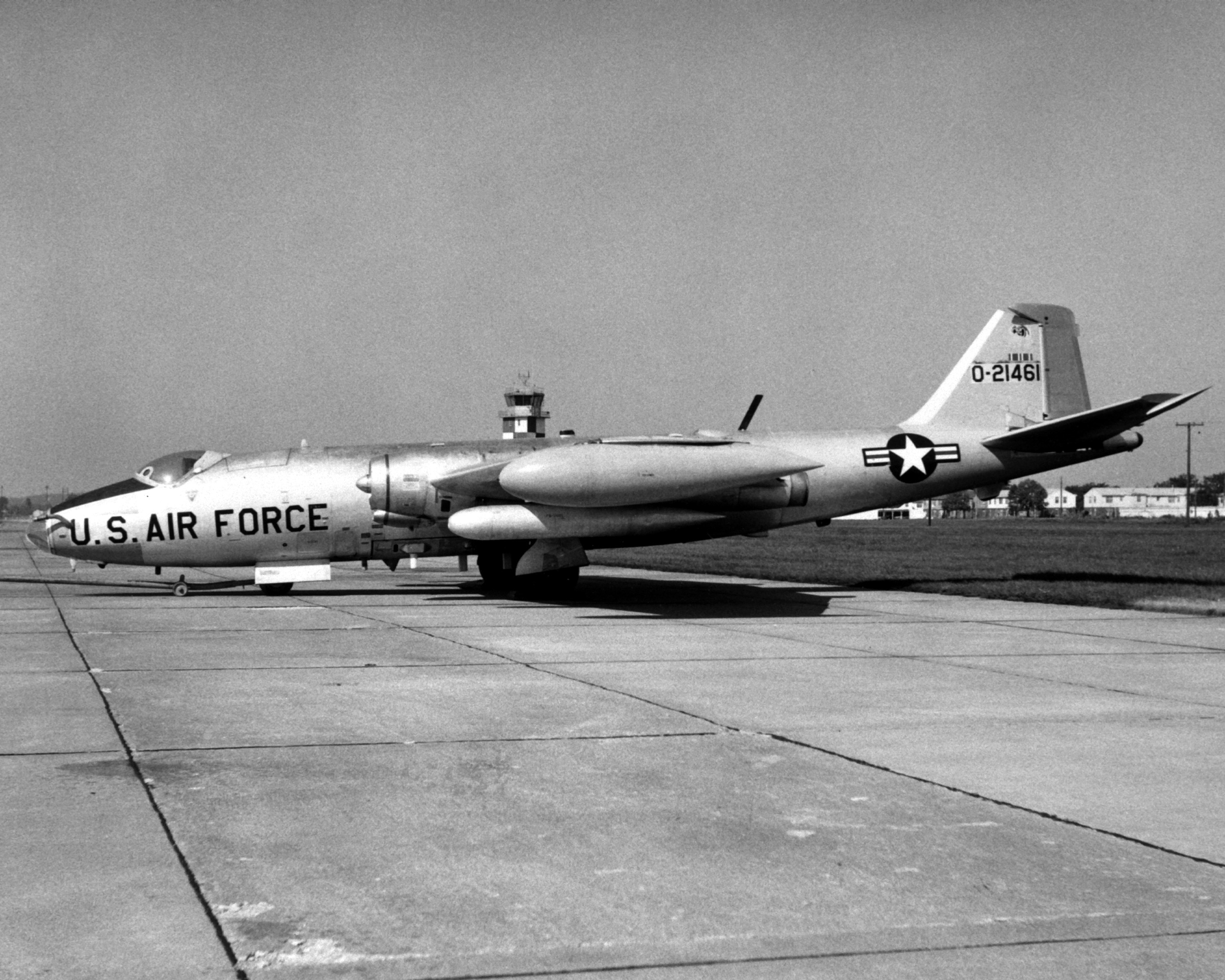
EB-57A parked at Scott AFB, 1969

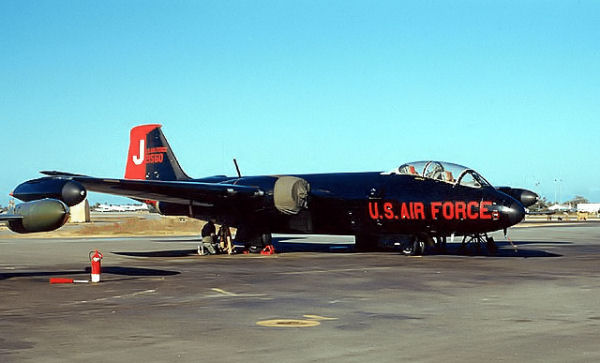
B-57B, 71st Bombardment Squadron, Laon-Couvron Air Base, circa 1957

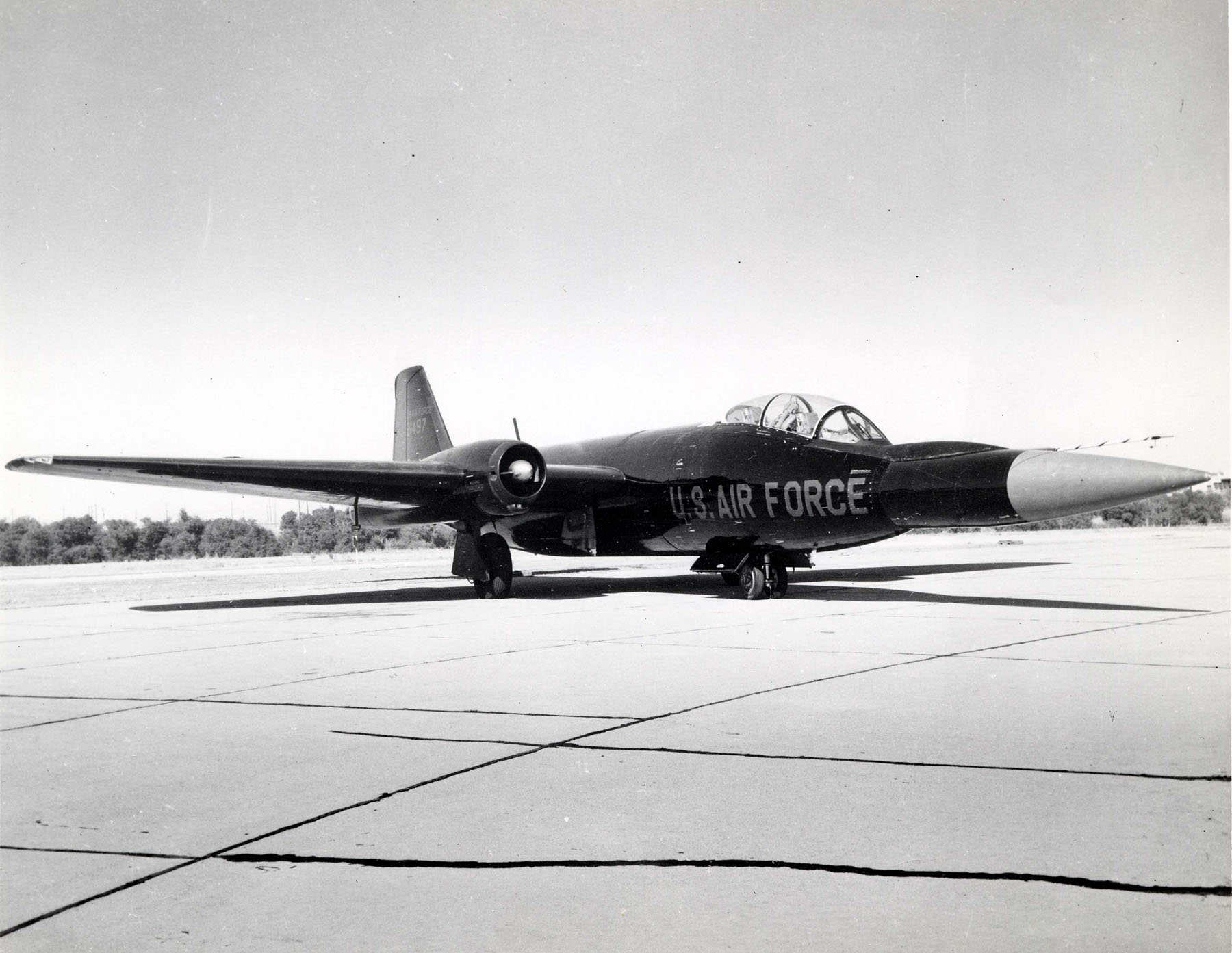
B-57E with nose graft from a Bomarc, for testing of the missile

The B-57A was not considered combat-ready by the USAF and the aircraft were used solely for testing and development. One of the aircraft was given to the U.S. Weather Bureau which fitted it with a new nose radome and used it to track hurricanes. The aircraft was placed into limited production. Particularly contentious were the cockpit arrangement and the lack of guns, the Canberra having been designed as a high-speed, high altitude bomber rather than for close air support. The definitive B-57B, which introduced numerous improvements, made its first flight on 18 June 1954. The aircraft initially suffered from the same engine malfunctions as the RB-57As and several were lost in high-speed low-level operations due to a faulty tailplane actuator which caused the aircraft to dive into the ground. The USAF came to consider the B-57B as being inadequate for the night intruder role and thus Martin put all aircraft through an extensive avionics upgrade in response. Regardless, by the end of 1957, the USAF tactical squadrons were being re-equipped with supersonic North American F-100 Super Sabres. The complete retirement was delayed, however, by the start of the Vietnam War.

=== Reconnaissance and electronic warfare B-57s ===
While the USAF found the B-57A lacking, the photo reconnaissance RB-57A saw some operational use. First flying in October 1953, RB-57As fully equipped the 363rd Tactical Reconnaissance Wing at Shaw Air Force Base by July 1954. The aircraft were also deployed with USAF squadrons in West Germany, France and Japan. However, operational readiness was poor and the aircraft suffered from significant production delays because of engine problems. Wright had subcontracted production of J65 engines to Buick, which resulted in slow deliveries and a tendency for engine oil to enter the bleed air system, filling the cockpit with smoke. The problems were ameliorated when Wright took over engine production in 1954. RB-57As also suffered from a high accident rate caused in part by poor single-engine handling. This resulted in the entire fleet spending much of 1955 on the ground. By 1958, all RB-57A craft were replaced in active service by the Douglas RB-66B and McDonnell RF-101A. Air National Guard (ANG) units extensively used the RB-57A for photographic surveys of the United States until 1971.

A number of modified RB-57As were used by the 7499th Support Group at Wiesbaden AB, West Germany in Operation "Heart Throb" reconnaissance missions over Europe. Ten aircraft were pulled off Martin's production line and modifications were performed in August 1955 by the Wright Air Development Center and by Martin. All equipment not absolutely essential for the daytime photography role was eliminated. The bomb bay door was removed and the area was skinned over. The seat for the system operator/navigator was removed, and an optical viewfinder was installed in the nose so that the pilot could perform all the reconnaissance duties without the assistance of the navigator. The clear plexiglass nose cone was replaced by an opaque fiberglass cone, but with a small optical glass window cut for the viewfinder. The plane's J65-W-5s were replaced by higher-thrust J65-W-7s. The aircraft was referred to as RB-57A-1. The weight reduction program shaved 5665 pounds off the weight of the RB-57A, and the ceiling was increased by 5000 feet.

Two RB-57A-1s were used by the Republic of China Air Force for reconnaissance missions over China; one was shot down by a Chinese Mikoyan-Gurevich MiG-17 on 18 February 1958 and the pilot killed. In 1959, two RB-57Ds were delivered to replace the A-types; one of them was shot down over China by a SA-2 Guideline missile, marking the first successful operational engagement of surface-to-air missiles. Two other RB-57As were used by the Federal Aviation Administration to plan high-altitude airways for the upcoming jet passenger aircraft.

Starting in 1959, Martin began to modify retired RB-57As with electronic countermeasures (ECM) equipment in the bomb bay. Redesignated EB-57A, these aircraft were deployed with Defense Systems Evaluation Squadrons which played the role of aggressors to train the friendly air defense units in the art of electronic warfare. Subsequent bomber variants were also modified to fulfill this role. Although initially conducted by active duty Air Force units, the EB-57 mission eventually migrated to selected ANG units. The ANG's EB-57s were replaced, in the 1980s, by the USAF's more advanced General Dynamics/Grumman EF-111A Raven operated by the active-duty USAF.

Strategic Air Command employed 20 RB-57D aircraft from 1956 until 1964. Little is known about their use. The aircraft were retired due to structural fatigue and the advent of the U-2 and SR-71.

=== NASA's High-altitude atmospheric research WB-57s ===
Since the early 1970s two WB-57F Canberras (NASA 926 and NASA 928) have been flown and maintained by NASA for high altitude atmospheric research. These same two aircraft have also been deployed alternately to Afghanistan for use as communications platforms that fly high over an area linking various communications devices on the battlefield and to other airborne assets, they were known as the Battlefield Airborne Communications Node system (BACN). In 2011 it was determined that a third aircraft was needed to satisfy mission requirements and an additional WB-57 was removed from the 309th AMARG after over 40 years at Davis-Monthan AFB and returned to flight status in August 2013 as NASA 927. Two of the NASA WB-57F's were flown in a scientific mission tracking the solar eclipse on 8 April 2024. They flew approximately 5 to 6 miles apart at 460 mph along the path of the eclipse, starting off the coast of Mexico, with around 6 1/2 to 7 minutes of time each within the umbra of the eclipse (the shadow of totality). On 27 January 2026 one of the three NASA aircraft, NASA 927, was seriously damaged after suffering a landing gear malfunction and belly landing at Ellington Field in Houston. Nobody was harmed in the incident. On 9 August 2026, one of the WB-57's departed Ellington Field, Texas, and made a stop in Bangor, Maine, before arriving at Keflavík Airport in Iceland on 10 August 2026. On 12 August 2026, the aircraft, NASA 926, was tasked to fly in the path of the solar eclipse sending back views for researchers to learn more about the celestial event.

=== Vietnam War ===
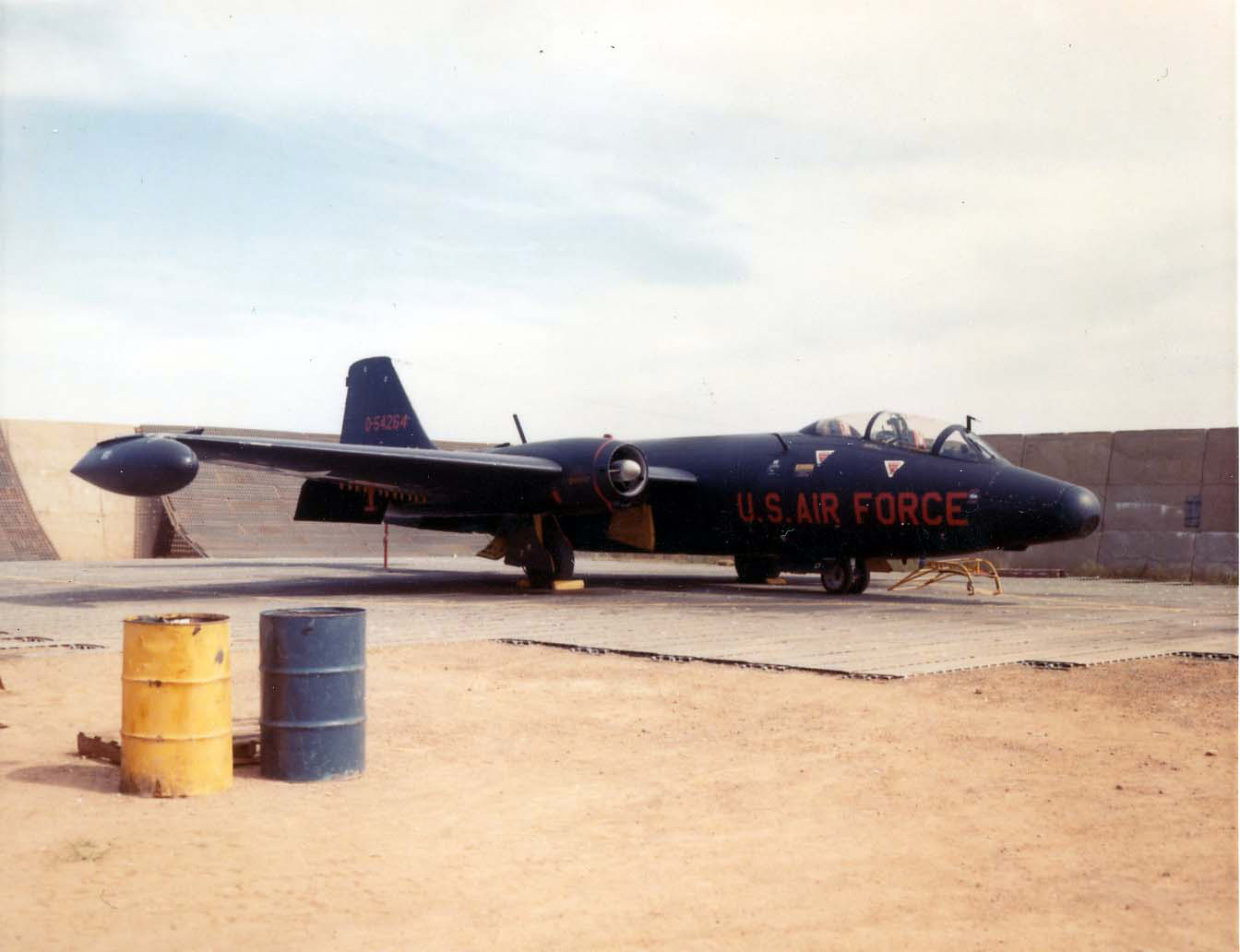
Patricia Lynn RB-57E at Da Nang, January 1964

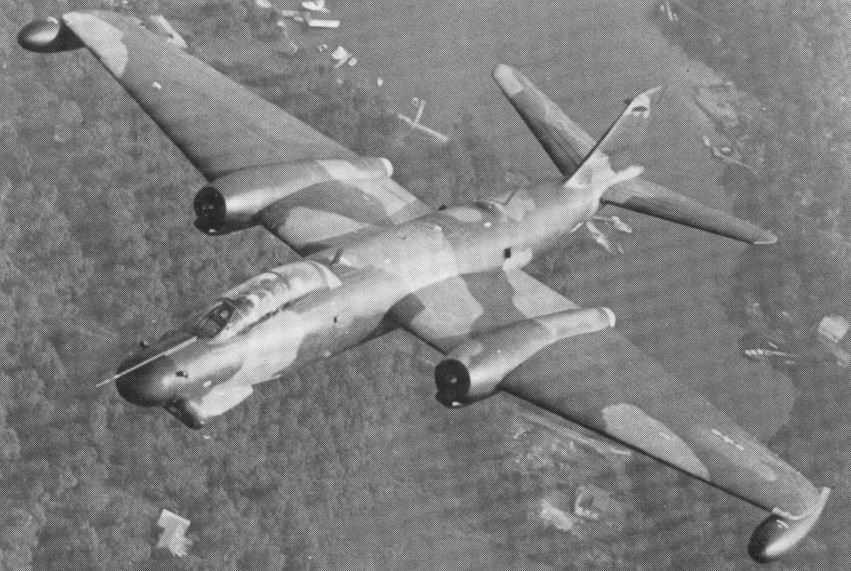
Tropic Moon III B-57G with FLIR/LLLTVradar mounted in the nose of the aircraft

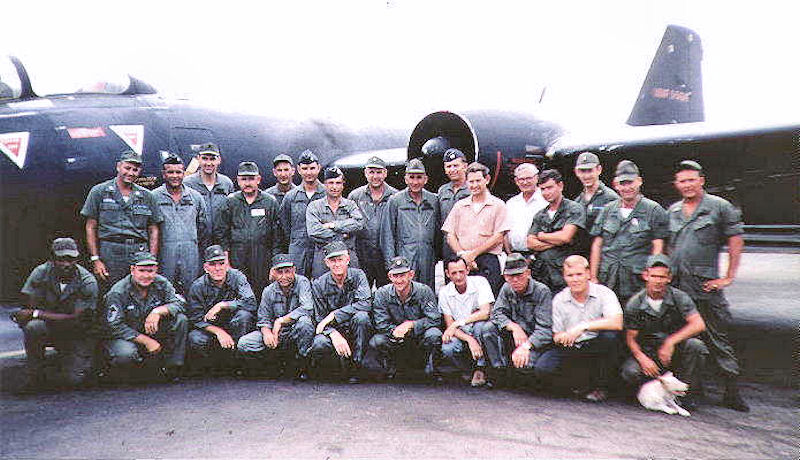
Det 1 460th Tactical Reconnaissance Wing Tan Son Nhut Air Base South Vietnam with RB-57E 55–4264, early 1968

==== Patricia Lynn Project ====
Although intended as a bomber and never before deployed by the USAF to a combat zone, the first B-57s to be deployed to South Vietnam were not operated in an offensive role. The need for additional reconnaissance assets, especially those capable of operating at night, led to the deployment of two RB-57E aircraft on 15 April 1963. The USAF had awarded General Dynamics a contract to modify two B-57Es (55-4243, 55–4245) as all-weather high-altitude strategic reconnaissance aircraft. Under project Patricia Lynn these aircraft provided infrared coverage using their Reconofax VI cameras.

General Dynamics was chosen to modify the B-57E as it had extensive experience modifying Canberras with the RB-57D and RB-57F projects and turning the B-57 into a high-altitude reconnaissance aircraft. The forward nose section of the B-57Es were modified to house a KA-1 36-inch forward oblique camera and a low panoramic KA-56 camera used on the Lockheed U-2. Mounted inside the specially configured bomb bay door was a KA-1 vertical camera, a K-477 split vertical day-night camera, an infrared scanner, and a KA-1 left oblique camera. The modified aircraft were redesignated RB-57E.

The 2nd Air Division was desperate for tactical intelligence and on arrival the pilots that ferried in the RB-57Es were immediately assigned to the Division as combat crews and briefed on missions by Divisional intelligence officers on the reconnaissance flights they would make.

The first mission was flown on 7 May 1963 by the highly classified Patricia Lynn squadron (Detachment 1, 33d Tactical Group, later 6250th Combat Support Group, later 460th Tactical Reconnaissance Wing) operating from Tan Son Nhut Air Base. The Detachment flew nighttime reconnaissance missions to identify Viet Cong (VC) base camps, small arms factories and storage and training areas. The sorties yielded results that heretofore only had been wished for. The nighttime imagery showed VC training and base camps; small, hidden factories and storage dumps that RF-101 Voodoo crews had flown over during the day and had been unable to locate from the air. The existing RF-101s in 1963 could only photograph a few kilometers (they had to fly very low) per flight with their cameras. The RB-57Es could image the whole border with Cambodia in 2 1/2 flights at 16,000 feet (4,900 m) to 17,000 feet (5,200 m) with superior results.

From then on, Patricia Lynn crews flew both night and day missions over South Vietnam, Laos, Cambodia and areas of North Vietnam until 1971. The RB-57Es carried the call-sign "Moonglow". Some missions were flown at low-level over single targets, others consisted of 4–6 specific targets. At night RB-57Es flew the canals and rivers in the Mekong Delta and southern part of South Vietnam. The sampans were easy to spot with the "real time" IR if the crew could keep over the canal which was difficult in the darkness.

The United States began Operation Steel Tiger over the Laos Panhandle and the Vietnamese Demilitarized Zone (DMZ) on 3 April 1965, to locate and destroy enemy forces and materiel being moved southward at night into South Vietnam, and to fly bomb damage assessment reconnaissance runs over targets attacked in the secret war the United States fought there. These flights teamed with B-57B bombers operating out of Bien Hoa Air Base and a C-130 Hercules flare ship. Three more aircraft were subsequently modified in 1964/65 bringing the number of aircraft to five.

Two RB-57Es were lost in combat operations. The first (S/N 55-4243) was lost as a result of a fuselage fire caused by small arms while on a low level reconnaissance mission in August 1965. The crew ejected safely when near Tan Son Nhut Air Base. The second aircraft (S/N 55-4264) was lost on 21 October 1968, after an engine fire started by ground fire forced the crew to eject.

A sixth Patricia Lynn aircraft (55–4257) joined the team in 1968, as a replacement for the combat losses. This aircraft had a Terrain-following radar designed to allow the aircraft to fly at a constant altitude, which would, in theory, produce better reconnaissance photos. Unfortunately, the aircraft flew so low (500–1000 feet) that the infrared film was used up before the entire assessment area could be photographed.

A 1968 update, under the Compass Eagle program, gave the back-seater a video display to monitor the IR scanner system. This allowed the crew to call in strikes on targets in real time, instead of having to return to base to get imagery developed, by which time the enemy would have likely moved on.

There were frequent changes and updating of the equipment, including the installation of 12-inch focal length KA-82 and 24-inch focal length KA-83 cameras. The infrared equipment was useful in spotting VC river traffic at night along the Mekong Delta southeast of Saigon.

In 1969/70, Patricia Lynn missions were flown into Laos and into Cambodia including Operation Barrel Roll strikes in 1969. The Patricia Lynn operation was terminated in mid-1971 with the inactivation of the 460th TRW and the four surviving aircraft returned to the United States.

Known RB-57E Patricia Lynn aircraft were:

- Martin B-57E-MA 55-4243 Modified to RB-57E in 1963. Lost in combat with Detachment 1, 6250th Combat Support Group, when hit by ground fire 5 August 1965 and caught fire while on return to base.
- Martin B-57E-MA 55–4245. Modified to RB-57E in 1963. Returned to CONUS June 1971. Converted to WB-57E. Retired to MASDC as BM0069 15 June 1972.
- Martin B-57E-MA 55–4237. Modified to RB-57E in 1964. Returned to CONUS June 1971. Converted to WB-57E. Retired to MASDC as BM0070 28 June 1972.
- Martin B-57E-MA 55–4249. Modified to RB-57E in 1964. Returned to CONUS June 1971. Converted to WB-57E. Retired to MASDC as BM0068 15 June 1972.
- Martin B-57E-MA 55–4264. Modified to RB-57E in 1965. Lost in combat with Detachment 1, 460th Tactical Reconnaissance Wing, 25 October 1968 after being hit by ground fire 3 mi SW of Truc Giang, South Vietnam. Both crews ejected safely and were rescued.
- Martin B-57E-MA 55–4257. Modified to RB-57E in 1968. Equipped with terrain-following radar. Converted to EB-57E in 1971 and transferred to ADC 4677th Defense Systems Evaluation Squadron, Hill AFB, Utah. Retired to MASDC in 1979.

Later in August 1965, a single RB-57F would be deployed to Udorn, RTAB in an attempt to gather information about North Vietnamese SAM sites, first under project Greek God and then under project Mad King. In December another RB-57F would be deployed for this purpose, under project Sky Wave. Neither project garnered useful results and they were terminated in October 1965 and February 1966 respectively.

==== Bombing and interdiction ====
The deployment of actual combat capable B-57Bs from 8th and 13th Bomb Squadrons to Bien Hoa Air Base in August 1964 began with two aircraft lost and one damaged in collisions on arrival. An additional five aircraft were destroyed with another 15 damaged by a VC mortar attack in November of the same year. Low level sorties designated as training flights were conducted with the hope of it having a psychological effect. As a result, the first combat mission was only flown on 19 February 1965. The first excursion into North Vietnam took place on 2 March as part of Operation Rolling Thunder. The aircraft typically carried nine 500 lb (227 kg) bombs in the bomb bay and four 750 lb (340 kg) bombs under the wings. In April, Canberras began flying night intruder missions supported by USAF's Fairchild C-123 Provider or C-130 Hercules flare ships and USN's EF-10B Skyknight electronic warfare aircraft.

B-57s were primarily used for dive bombing and strafing, with the early models mounting eight .50 caliber machine guns, four per wing. Later models mounted four 20mm cannons, two per wing, for strafing. These weapons combined with their bomb loads and four hours of flight time made them excellent ground support aircraft, as well as exceptional truck killers along the Ho Chi Minh trail. Deployed along the "trail" for much of their eight years in Vietnam, Canberras participated in truck hunting campaigns during operations Barrel Roll, Steel Tiger, and Tiger Hound, gaining reputations with their "Centurion Club" which consisted of Canberra crews which attained 100 truck kills.

On 16 May 1965, an armed B-57B exploded on the runway at Biên Hòa, setting off a chain reaction that destroyed 10 other Canberras, 11 Douglas A-1 Skyraiders, and one Vought F-8 Crusader. Due to combat attrition, in October 1966, B-57Bs were transferred to Phan Rang where they supported operations in the Iron Triangle along with Australian-built Canberra B.20s of No. 2 Squadron RAAF. The aircraft also continued to fly night interdiction missions against the Ho Chi Minh trail. Of the 94 B-57Bs deployed to Southeast Asia, 51 were lost in combat and seven other Canberras were lost to other causes. Only nine were still flying by 1969.

B-57s returned to Southeast Asia in the form of the Tropic Moon III B-57G, deployed to Thailand in late 1970. Intended as a night intruder to help combat movement along the Ho Chi Minh trail, these aircraft were equipped with a variety of new sensors and other equipment, and were capable of dropping laser guided munitions. The relative kill rates per sortie during Operation Commando Hunt V between the B-57G and the AC-130A/E showed that the former was not as suited to the role of truck hunter. An attempt to combine both led to one B-57G being modified to house a special bomb bay installation of one Emerson TAT-161 turret with a single M61 20mm cannon as a gunship under project Pave Gat. After delays in testing at Eglin AFB, Florida, due to competition for mission time from the Tropic Moon III B-57Gs, Pave Gat tests proved "that the B-57G could hit stationary or moving targets with its 20mm gun, day or night. Loaded with 4,000 rounds of ammunition, the Pave Gat B-57G could hit as many as 20 targets, three times as many as the bomb-carrying B-57G. The Pave Gat aircraft could avoid antiaircraft fire by firing from offset positions, while the bomb carrier had to pass directly over the target." Deployment to SEA was resisted, however, by the Seventh and Thirteenth Air Forces and others as the decision had been made in August 1971 to return the B-57G squadron to the U.S. in early 1972, leaving insufficient evaluation time. Project Pave Gat was terminated 21 December 1971. The B-57G was removed from Thailand in May 1972. Plans remained for the continuation of the B-57G program but post-conflict spending cuts forced the abandonment of these plans.

For a short period Republic of Vietnam Air Force (RVNAF) personnel operated four B-57B aircraft. The RVNAF never officially took control of the aircraft, and, after accidents and other problems, including apparent claims by RVNAF pilots that the B-57 was beyond their physical capabilities, the program was terminated in April 1966, and the aircraft were returned to their original USAF units.

A total of 58 B-57 Canberras were recorded as having been lost during the Vietnam War; of these, 26 were lost to ground fire, five were lost to mortar fire and ground attack, four were lost to mid-air collision, ten were lost to airfield accidental bomb explosion, seven were lost to operational causes, and six were lost due to unknown causes.

=== Pakistan ===
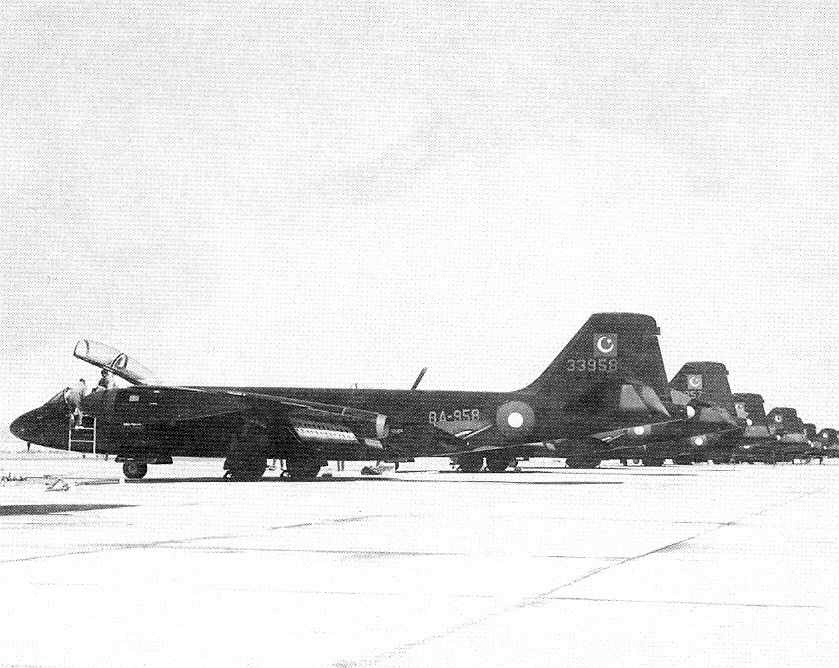
Pakistan Air Force B-57s

The Pakistan Air Force (PAF) was the other main user of the B-57 and made use of it in two wars with India. In the Indo-Pakistani War of 1965, B-57s flew 167 sorties, dropping over 600 tons of bombs. Three B-57s were lost in action (only one as a result of enemy action), along with one RB-57F electronic intelligence aircraft. During the war, the bomber wing of the PAF attacked the concentration of airfields in north India. To avoid enemy fighter-bombers, the B-57s operated from several different airbases, taking off from and returning to different bases. The B-57 bombers would arrive over their targets in a stream at intervals of about 15 minutes, which led to achieving a major disruption of the overall IAF effort. The then unknown Pakistani pilot, 8-Pass Charlie, (Squadron Leader Najeeb Ahmad Khan, Sitara-e-Jurrat) was named by his adversaries for making eight passes in the moonlight, to bomb different targets with each of the B-57's bombs.

During the Indo-Pakistani War of 1971, the PAF again made use of the B-57. On the first night, 12 IAF runways were targeted and a total of 183 bombs were dropped rendering the Indian airfields useless for 6 hours to 6 days. As the war progressed, PAF B-57s carried out many night missions. There was a higher attrition rate than in 1965, with at least five B-57s being put out of service by the end of the war.

PAF's B-57 Squadron was the first to form a regular formation aerobatics team of four such aircraft.

They were retired from PAF service in 1985.

== Variants ==
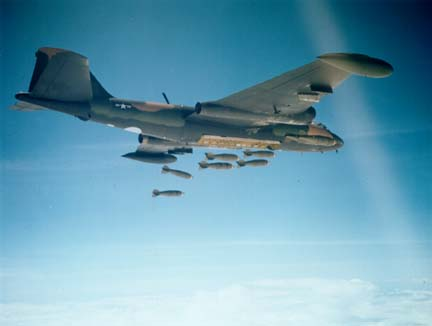
USAF B-57 dropping 750 lb (340 kg) bombs

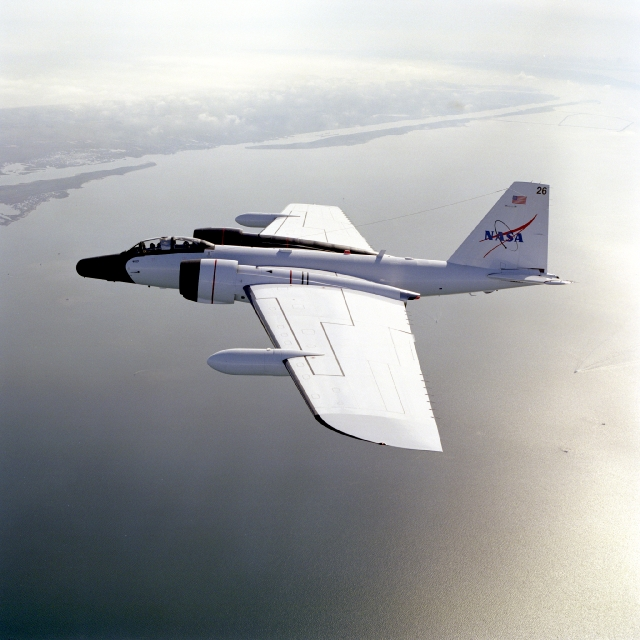
A WB-57F flies over the Gulf of Mexico near its base at NASA JSC.

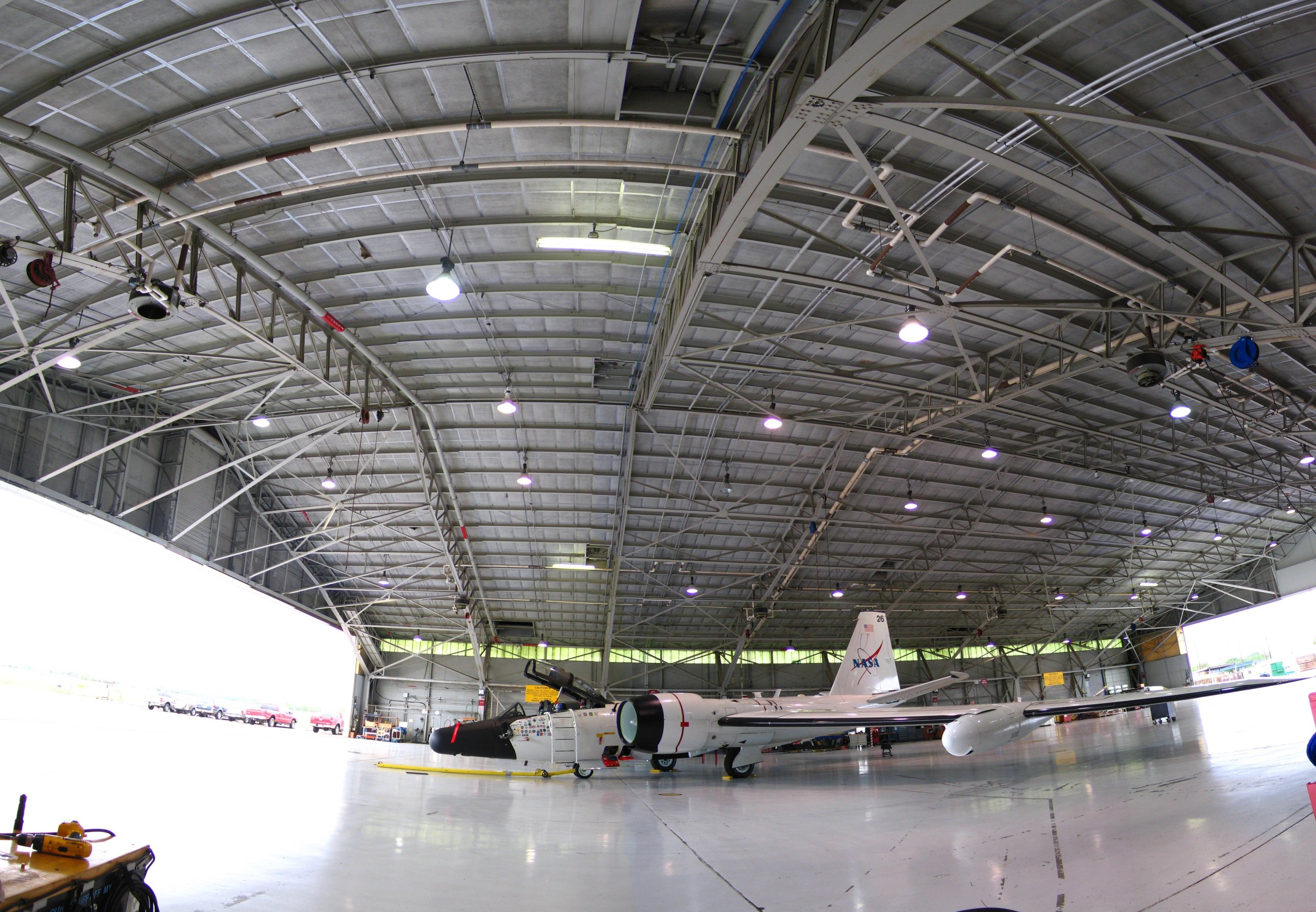
Panorama of Ellington field's hangar 990, with one of the three WB-57Fs inside

The designations given to the B-57 as part of the mission-design-series system have proven particularly abundant and sometimes confusing. Indeed, there are several instances of the same designation being given to aircraft of different configurations, while different designations have been given to aircraft without any underlying change in configuration.

B-57A
Initial production variant, almost identical to the British Canberra B.2. Eight built.
UB-57A
One B-57A was temporarily assigned to research, development, and evaluation missions.
JB-57A
Six B-57A's temporarily assigned to research, development and evaluation duties.
NB-57A
Two JB-57A's reassigned from temporary to permanent research, development and evaluation duties
RB-57A
Photo reconnaissance production version with cameras installed aft of the bomb bay; 67 built. RB-57A avionics included an AN/APS-11A transponder and AN/APA-90 Indicator Group for command guidance (LEFT, RIGHT, CLIMB, DESCEND, BOMB, etc.) and was tested for "MSQ-1 controlled pinpoint photography" in 1954 ("Night Photo Bombing" capacity was 21 M-120 photoflash bombs).
EB-57A
Twelve RB-57A's converted in 1966 as electronic aggressor aircraft.
RB-57A-1
Ten RB-57A's modified for high-altitude photographic reconnaissance under the Heart Throb program (see the main text for details)
ERB-57A
One RB-57A temporarily assigned to research, development and evaluation duties; redesignated JRB-57A on 1 December 1955;
JRB-57A
Eight RB-57A's (including one redesignated on 1 December 1955 from ERB-57A) temporarily assigned to research, development and evaluation duties.
NRB-57A
Seven JRB-57A's reassigned from temporary to permanent research, development and evaluation duties
B-57B
Definitive production version, tandem cockpit, 8x 0.50 in (12.7 mm) machine guns or 4x 20 mm cannons, four underwing hardpoints; 202 built.
EB-57B (1st use)
Two B-57B's temporarily assigned to research, development and evaluation duties; redesignated JB-57B on 1 December 1955;
EB-57B (2nd use)
31 B-57B's, RB-57B's and NB-57B converted as electronic aggressor aircraft. Initially, 16 B-57B's and 6 atomospheric sampling RB-57B's were converted in 1964–1965. However, twelve of those 22 aircraft reverted in 1965–1966 to the B-57B bomber configuration in order to replace losses endured in Southeast Asia. They were initially replaced in their electronic aggressor role by the 12 EB-57A's. When those were retired in 1972, 10 B-57B's (including two of those earlier converted and then de-converted to EB-57B) and a lone NB-57B were converted to EB-57B standards, bringing the total conversions to 31.
JB-57B
38 B-57B's (including two redesignated on 1 December 1955 from EB-57B) temporarily assigned to research, development and evaluation duties. Eleven of those were configured as atmospheric sampling aircraft in support of the US' atomic test campaigns.
MSB-57B
Unofficial designation of two B-57B's configured with MartinTM-76A Mace missile nose sections incorporating the Automatic Terrain Recognition And Navigation – ATRAN guidance system in order to establish radar images of the missiles' planned flightpaths. Both were later converted to RB-57F standards.
NB-57B
16 JB-57B's reassigned from temporary to permanent research, development and evaluation duties. These included the nine surviving atmospheric sampling JB-57B's.
RB-57B
The same designation covered 38 aircraft in two distinct configurations : 31 B-57B's converted for photographic reconnaissance, to be assigned to Air National Guard units and the seven remaining atmospheric sampling NB-57B's, redesignated RB-57B on 31 December 1962. Of the photographic reconnaissance RB-57B's, 26 reverted to the B-57B bomber configuration in order to replace losses endured in Southeast Asia.
B-57C
Dual-control, combat-capable production version of the B-57B; first flight on 30 December 1954; 38 ordered but only 36 built, as two were completed on the production line as target towing B-57E's and quickly redesignated as such.
JB-57C
One B-57C temporarily assigned to research, development and evaluation duties.
RB-57C
As with the RB-57B, the RB-57C designation covered 14 aircraft in two distinct configurations : six B-57C's converted for photographic reconnaissance, to be assigned to Air National Guard units and another eight configured for atmospheric sampling in support to the US's atomic test campaigns. Of the photographic reconnaissance RB-57C's, 5 reverted to the B-57C bomber-trainer configuration in order to replace losses endured in Southeast Asia. The six surviving atmospheric sampling RB-57C's were redesignated as WB-57C on 31 March 1972.
TB-57C
On 29 April 1958, those B-57C's assigned to 1001st Air Base Wing in Andrews AFB and to 7499th Support Group in Frankfurt-Rhein Main AB were redesignated TB-57C without change in configuration. As these aircraft were reassigned to other units, they regained their B-57C designation.
WB-57C
The six surviving atmospheric sampling RB-57C's redesignated on 31 March 1972.
EB-57D
Nine RB-57D's converted in 1966 as electronic aggressor aircraft.
RB-57D
see: Martin RB-57D Canberra
High-altitude strategic reconnaissance version, J57-P-9 engines, wingspan increased to 106 ft (32.31 m), first flight: 3 November 1955; 20 built.
JRB-57D
Three RB-57D's temporarily assigned to research, development and evaluation duties.
NRB-57D
One JRB-57D reassigned from temporary to permanent research, development and evaluation duties. Its crash following structural failure on 3 January 1964 led to the early retirement of the whole RB-57D fleet.
B-57E
Dual-control trainer and target tug version, first flight: 16 May 1956; 70 built, of which two had been ordered as B-57C's.
EB-57E
30 B-57E's converted in 1964–1965 as electronic aggressor aircraft (26) and for electronic intelligence (4), the latter being assigned to PACAF's 6091st (later 556th) Reconnaissance Squadron.
JB-57E
Nine B-57E's temporarily assigned to research, development and evaluation duties.
NB-57E
Three JB-57E's reassigned from temporary to permanent research, development and evaluation duties.
RB-57E
The RB-57E designation covered nine aircraft, in this case in three distinct configurations. In 1960, four B-57E's were converted for photographic reconnaissance, to be assigned to Air National Guard units. They were followed in 1961 by another two configured for atmospheric sampling in support to the US's atomic test campaigns. Finally, starting in 1963, six aircraft (including one photographic reconnaissance RB-57E and the two atmospheric sampling RB-57E's) were converted to an all-weather reconnaissance configuration under the Patricia Lynn programme (see main text above). On top of those nine aircraft, two B-57E's were converted in 1968–1969 to an unspecified reconnaissance configuration by TEMCO in Greenville-Majors MAP (Texas); they were operated by TAC's 363rd Tactical Reconnaissance Wing in Shaw AFB (South Carolina) without change in designation until 1975.
TB-57E
On 1 July 1961, those B-57E's assigned to ADC's 4677th and 4713th Defense Systems Evaluation Squadrons were redesignated TB-57E without change in configuration. They kept that designation until converted EB-57E standards.
RB-57F
see: Martin RB-57F Canberra
High-altitude strategic reconnaissance version developed by General Dynamics. Pratt & Whitney TF33 turbofan engines, wingspan increased to 122 ft (37.5 m), first flight 23 June 1963; 21 converted from RB-57A (3), B-57B (7), JB-57B (3), MSB-57B (2), RB-57B (2), RB-57D (4). Used by NOAA from 1960–1971.
WB-57F
The 19 surviving RB-57F's redesignated on 31 March 1972. Three aircraft (registration numbers N926NA, N927NA, and N928NA) are operated by NASA Johnson Space Center (JSC) in Houston, Texas for space and earth sciences research.
B-57G
16 B-57B's modified as night intruders with FLIR, LLLTV and laser designator in the nose, capable of using laser-guided bombs.

== Operators ==
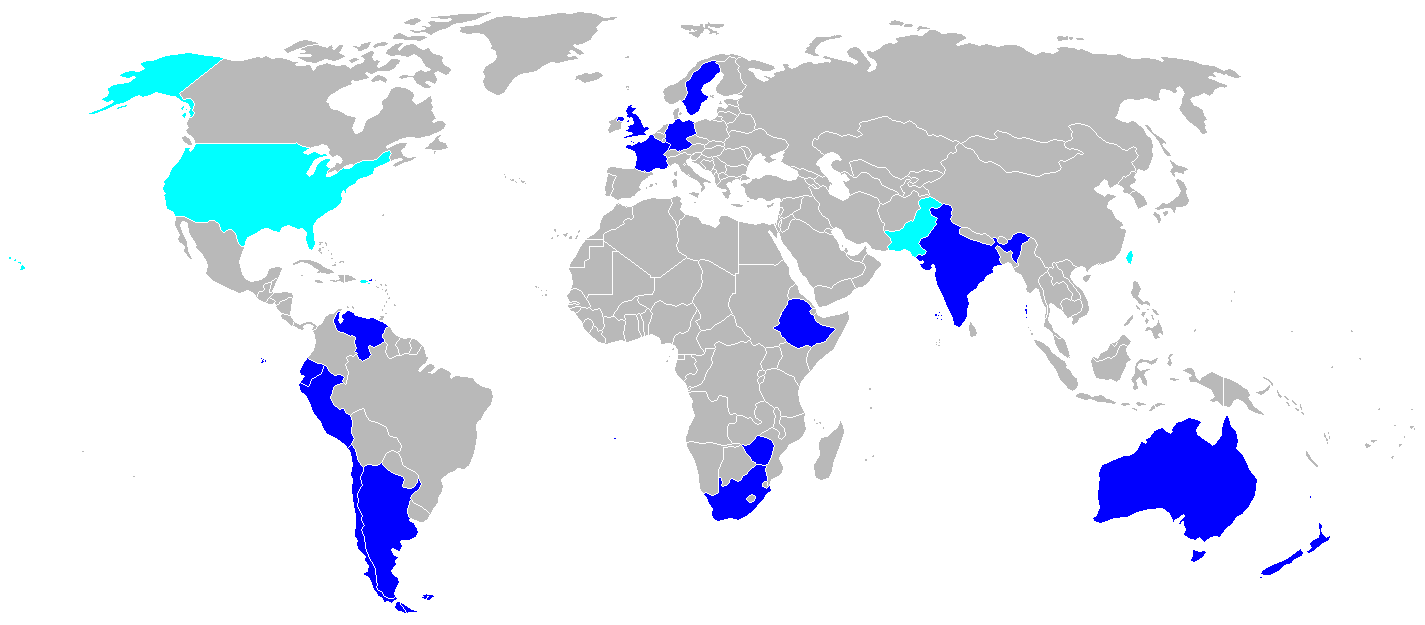
English Electric Canberra (dark blue) and B-57 (light blue) operators

Pakistan

- Pakistan Air Force
- 24 B-57B, 2 B-57C, 2 RB-57B and 2 RB-57F from 1959 to 1985
  - No. 31 Bomber Wing
    - No. 7 Squadron Bandits
    - No. 8 squadron Haiders

Taiwan

- Republic of China Air Force

United States

- United States Air Force

List of B-57 units of the United States Air Force

- NASA
- NCAR/High Altitude Mapping Missions, Inc,
- Environmental Science Services Administration (ESSA) National Hurricane Research Lab of the United States Commerce Department

== Aircraft on display ==
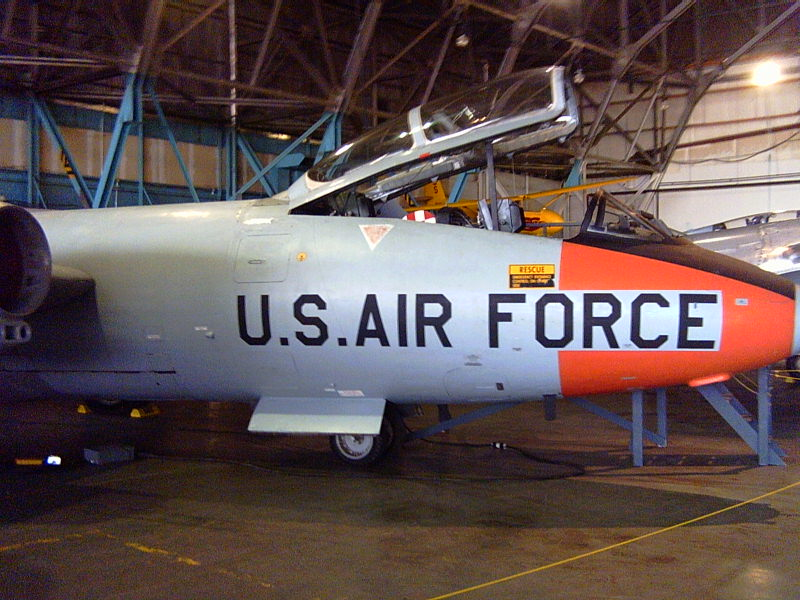
EB-57E at Wings Over the Rockies Museum, Colorado, 2007

RB-57A

- 52-1426 – Michigan Flight Museum formerly the Yankee Air Museum in Belleville, Michigan.
- 52-1446 – Glenn L. Martin Maryland Aviation Museum, Martin State Airport, Middle River, Maryland.
- 52-1459 – Wings of Eagles Discovery Center in Horseheads, New York.
- 52-1467 – Glenn L. Martin Maryland Aviation Museum, Martin State Airport, Middle River, Maryland.
- 52-1475 – Museum of Aviation at Robins AFB, Georgia.
- 52-1480 – Kansas Air National Guard / 190th Air Refueling Wing complex, Forbes Field Air National Guard Base (former Forbes AFB), Topeka, Kansas.
- 52-1482 – USAF Airman Heritage Museum, Lackland AFB, San Antonio, Texas.
- 52-1485 – Selfridge Military Air Museum and Air Park, Selfridge ANGB, Michigan.
- 52-1488 – New England Air Museum, Windsor Locks, Connecticut.
- 52-1492 – Hill Aerospace Museum at Hill AFB, Utah. In April 1968, this aircraft was delivered to the National Museum of the United States Air Force at Wright-Patterson AFB in Dayton, Ohio, and was displayed there until 1982 when it was transferred back to Hill Aerospace Museum.

B-57B

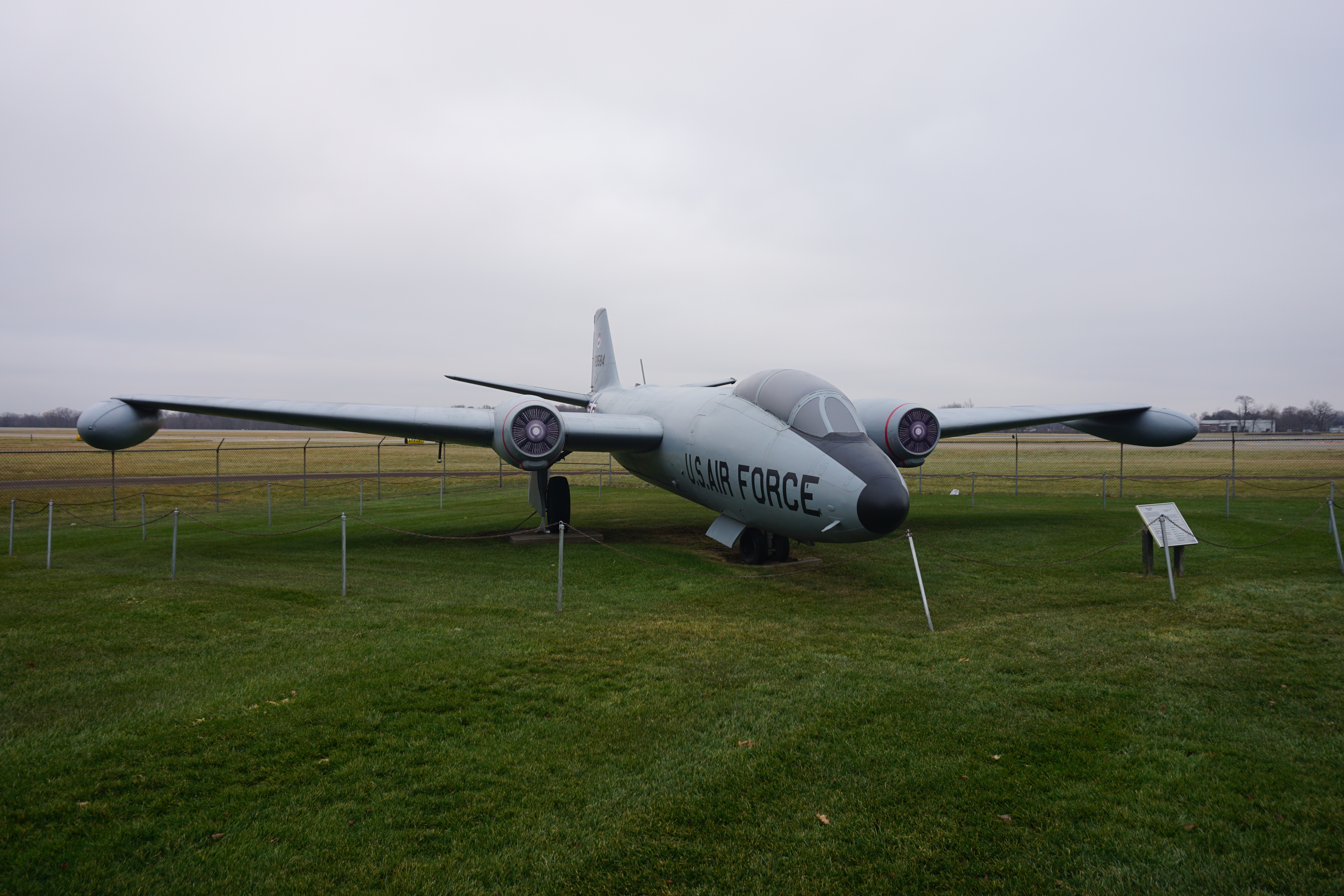
B-57B on display at the Air Zoo

- 52-1499 – National Museum of the United States Air Force, Wright-Patterson AFB, Dayton, Ohio. This aircraft was assigned to Wright-Patterson Air Force Base in Dayton, Ohio as a test aircraft in the early 1960s. In 1965, it was returned to combat configuration to replace combat losses in Southeast Asia. It was assigned to the 8th Bomb Squadron at Phan Rang AB, South Vietnam in 1967, where it flew combat missions for 2 1/2 years. Upon return to the United States, it was converted to an electronic countermeasures EB-57B and was flown to the museum in August 1981. It is on display in the Museum's Modern Flight gallery where it replaced an RB-57A (AF Ser. No. 52-1492) that had been on display at the Museum since April 1968. In 2012 Museum staff reconverted it to stock B-57B configuration and placed it back on display.
- 52-1576 – Air Force Flight Test Museum, Edwards AFB, California.
- 52-1584 – Air Zoo, Kalamazoo Aviation History Museum, Kalamazoo, Michigan.
- 53-3957 – Pakistan Air Force Museum, Karachi.

EB-57B

- 52–1500 – Vermont Air National Guard / 158th Fighter Wing complex at Burlington Air National Guard Base at Burlington International Airport in Burlington, Vermont.
- 52-1504 – Dyess Linear Air Park, Dyess AFB, Texas.
- 52-1505 – Malmstrom AFB Museum and Air Park, Malmstrom AFB, Montana.
- 52-1506 – Celebrity Row, Davis-Monthan AFB (North Side), Tucson, Arizona.
- 52-1509 – Laughlin AFB, Texas.
- 52-1516 – Air Force Armament Museum at Eglin AFB, Florida.
- 52-1519 – March Field Air Museum, March ARB (former March AFB), Riverside, California.
- 52-1526 – Kansas National Guard Museum, Topeka Regional Airport (former Forbes AFB), Topeka, Kansas.
- 52-1548 – South Dakota Air and Space Museum, Ellsworth AFB, Rapid City, South Dakota.
- 52-1551 – on loan at the Museum of Aviation at Robins AFB, Georgia. from the National Air and Space Museum.

B-57C

- 53-3841 – 314th Airlift Wing complex, Little Rock AFB in Little Rock, Arkansas.

B-57E

- 55-4244 – Strategic Air Command & Aerospace Museum near Offutt AFB in Ashland, Nebraska.
- 55-4274 – Pima Air & Space Museum, adjacent to Davis-Monthan AFB in Tucson, Arizona.

EB-57E

- 55-4253 – Castle Air Museum (former Castle AFB) in Atwater, California.
- 55-4279 – Peterson Air and Space Museum at Peterson AFB in Colorado Springs, Colorado.
- 55-4293 – Wings Over the Rockies Air and Space Museum at the former Lowry AFB in Denver, Colorado.

RB-57D

- 53-3982 – National Museum of the United States Air Force, Wright-Patterson AFB, Dayton, Ohio. This RB-57D is one of the 13 photoreconnaissance RB-57Ds. Painted as it appeared in the late 1950s while it served in the 4080th Strategic Reconnaissance Wing, 4025th Strategic Reconnaissance Squadron (L), it went on display in 2004.

== Specifications (B-57B) ==
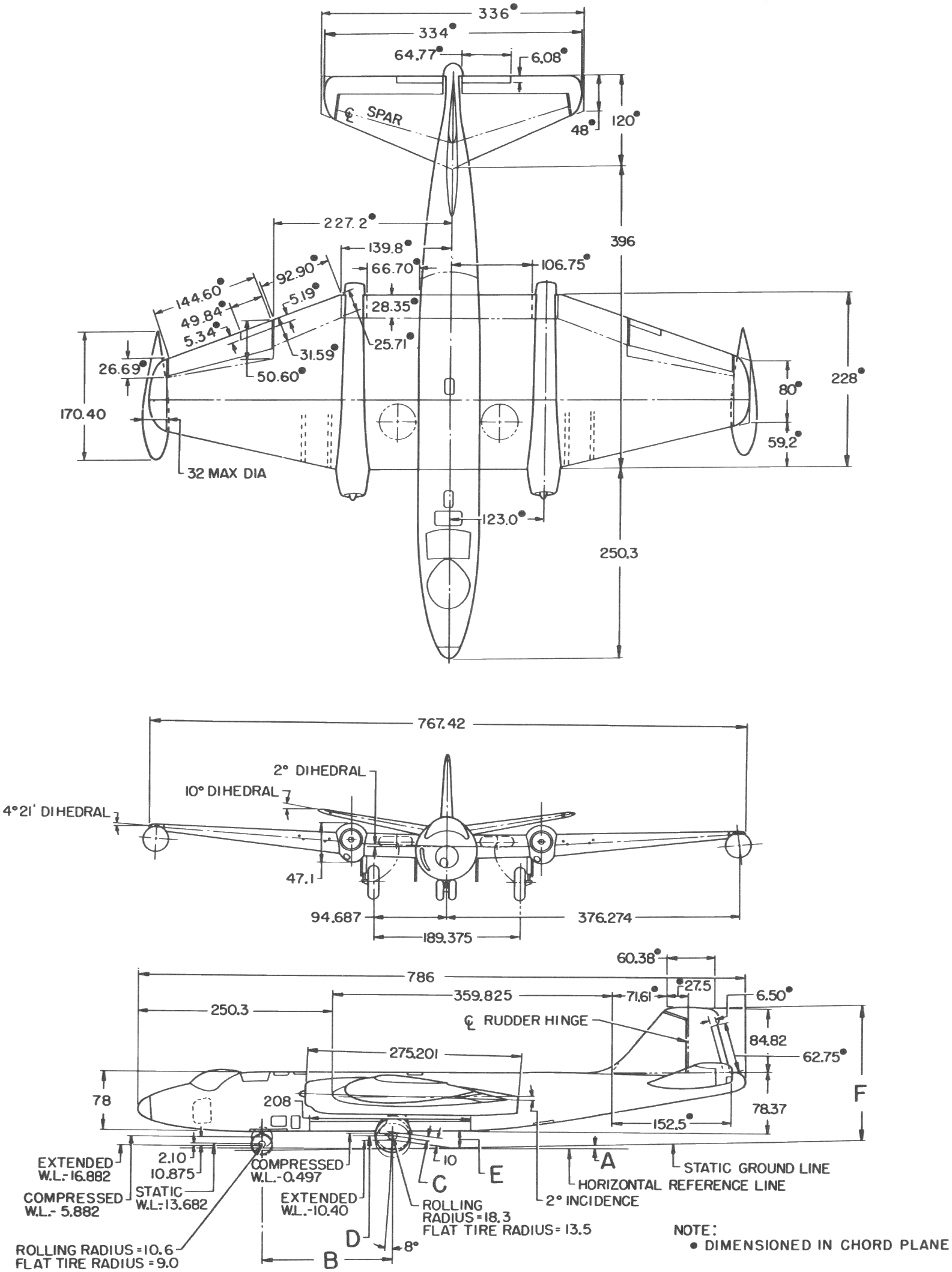
3-view line drawing of the Martin B-57A Canberra

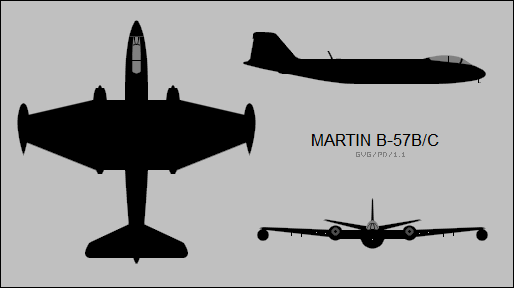
3-view silhouette drawing of the Martin B-57B/C Canberra

Data from Quest for Performance, Jet Bombers.

General characteristics

- Crew: 2 (pilot, navigator)
- Length: 65 ft 6 in (20.0 m)
- Wingspan: 64 ft 0 in (19.5 m)
- Height: 14 ft 10 in (4.52 m)
- Wing area: 960 sq ft (89 m^{2})
- Empty weight: 27,090 lb (12,285 kg)
- Gross weight: 40,345 lb (18,300 kg)
- Max takeoff weight: 53,720 lb (24,365 kg)
- Zero-lift drag coefficient: 0.0119
- Drag area: 11.45 ft^{2} (1.06 m^{2})
- Aspect ratio: 4.27
- Powerplant: 2 × Wright J65-W-5 turbojets, 7,220 lbf (32.1 kN) thrust each

Performance

- Maximum speed: 598 mph (960 km/h, 520 kn) at 2,500 ft (760 m)
- Maximum speed: Mach 0.79
- Cruise speed: 476 mph (765 km/h, 414 kn)
- Stall speed: 124 mph (200 km/h, 108 kn)
- Combat range: 950 mi (1,530 km, 825 nmi) with 5,250 lb (2,380 kg) of bombs
- Ferry range: 2,720 mi (4,380 km, 2,360 nmi)
- Service ceiling: 45,100 ft (13,745 m)
- Rate of climb: 6,180 ft/min (31.4 m/s)
- Wing loading: 42 lb/sq ft (205 kg/m^{2})
- Thrust/weight: 0.36
- Lift-to-drag ratio: 15.0

Armament

- Guns: 4× 20 mm (0.787 in) M39 cannon, 290 rounds/gun
- Bombs: 4,500 lb (2,000 kg) in bomb bay, including nuclear bombs
  - 2,800 lb (1,300 kg) on four external hardpoints, including unguided rockets

Avionics

- APW-11 Bombing Air Radar Guidance System
- SHORAN bombing system
- APS-54 Radar Warning Receiver

== See also ==
External videos
- Documentary on the Martin B-57 Canberra
- Footage of B-57 Canberras in service
- Period film on B-57 Emergency Single-Engine Landing Procedure
- NASA B-57 Canberra at Prestwick, Scotland

Related development

- English Electric Canberra
- Martin RB-57D Canberra
- Martin/General Dynamics RB-57F Canberra

Aircraft of comparable role, configuration, and era

- Douglas B-66 Destroyer
- Ilyushin Il-28
- Sud Aviation Vautour IIA/B
- Tupolev Tu-14

Related lists

- List of bomber aircraft
- List of military aircraft of the United States
