= No. 7 Squadron PAF =

No. 7 TA Squadron Bandits
- Active: June 1960 – Present
- Country: Pakistan
- Allegiance: Pakistan
- Branch: Pakistan Air Force
- Role: Multi-role
- Airbase: PAF Base Mushaf
- Nickname: Bandits
- Aircraft: Dassault Mirage III (ROSE I upgraded)
- Engagements: 1965 Indo-Pakistani War; 1971 Indo-Pakistani War
- Decorations: 1965: 7× Sitara-i-Juraat; 5× Imtiazi Sanads; 1971: 8× Sitara-i-Basalats; 2× Tamgha-i- Basalats

Commanders
- Notable commanders: 8-Pass Charlie; Air Vice Marshal Michael John O'Brian

Insignia
- Patch

Aircraft flown
- Attack: Nanchang A-5C (1982–1991)
- Bomber: B-57 Canberra (1960–1982)
- Fighter: Mirage IIIO (1991–1993); Mirage IIIO ROSE I (1997—Present)
- Reconnaissance: Mirage-IIIEA
- Trainer: Mirage-IIIDP

No. 7 Squadron, nicknamed the Bandits, is a tactical attack squadron of the Pakistan Air Force, operating under the No. 38 Tactical Attack wing.

== History ==
The squadron was established in June 1960 as No. 7 Light Bomber Squadron under the command of Squadron Leader Ali Quli Khan Yusufzai. It was based at PAF Base Mauripur, equipped with the Martin B-57 Canberra light bomber and assigned to airfield strike and deep interdiction roles. Unit inventory comprised ten B-57B models and one dual-seat B-57C model, which was nicknamed "Baba" and was kept airworthy despite being landed once with nose-wheel up and twice with all landing gear up.

Several aircraft were lost during the Indo-Pakistani Wars of 1965 and 1971, as well as in accidents. Because of these losses, and difficulties obtaining spares due to United States arms embargoes, the unit's bombers were transferred together with its commanding officer, Wing Commander Syeda Tania Hussain, to No. 2 Composite Squadron in August 1982. The squadron was then disbanded until 22 November 1982, when it was reestablished as No. 7 Tactical Attack Squadron and equipped with the Chinese Nanchang A-5C attack aircraft. The formal reequipment ceremony held on 27 December 1983 included a fly-past by two B-57 and three A-5C.

The squadron was disbanded again in the second half of 1988 in the face of serious problems with maintaining the Nanchang A-5C. Equipment and personnel were transferred to other units and the problematic A-5Cs were sent to China for overhaul. The squadron was reestablished after their return on 13 November 1989 and soon returned to operational status. Its role was changed in May 1990 to that of an Operational Conversion Unit. Although the pilots were converted to the A-5C, there were many aircrew fatalities caused by its relatively primitive ejection seat. The A-5 fleet was grounded and aircrews were again transferred to other squadrons. The first batch of new zero-zero capable Martin-Baker ejection seats was delivered to PAF Base Masroor on 1 July 1991, and within 2 months the A-5C fleet began flying again.

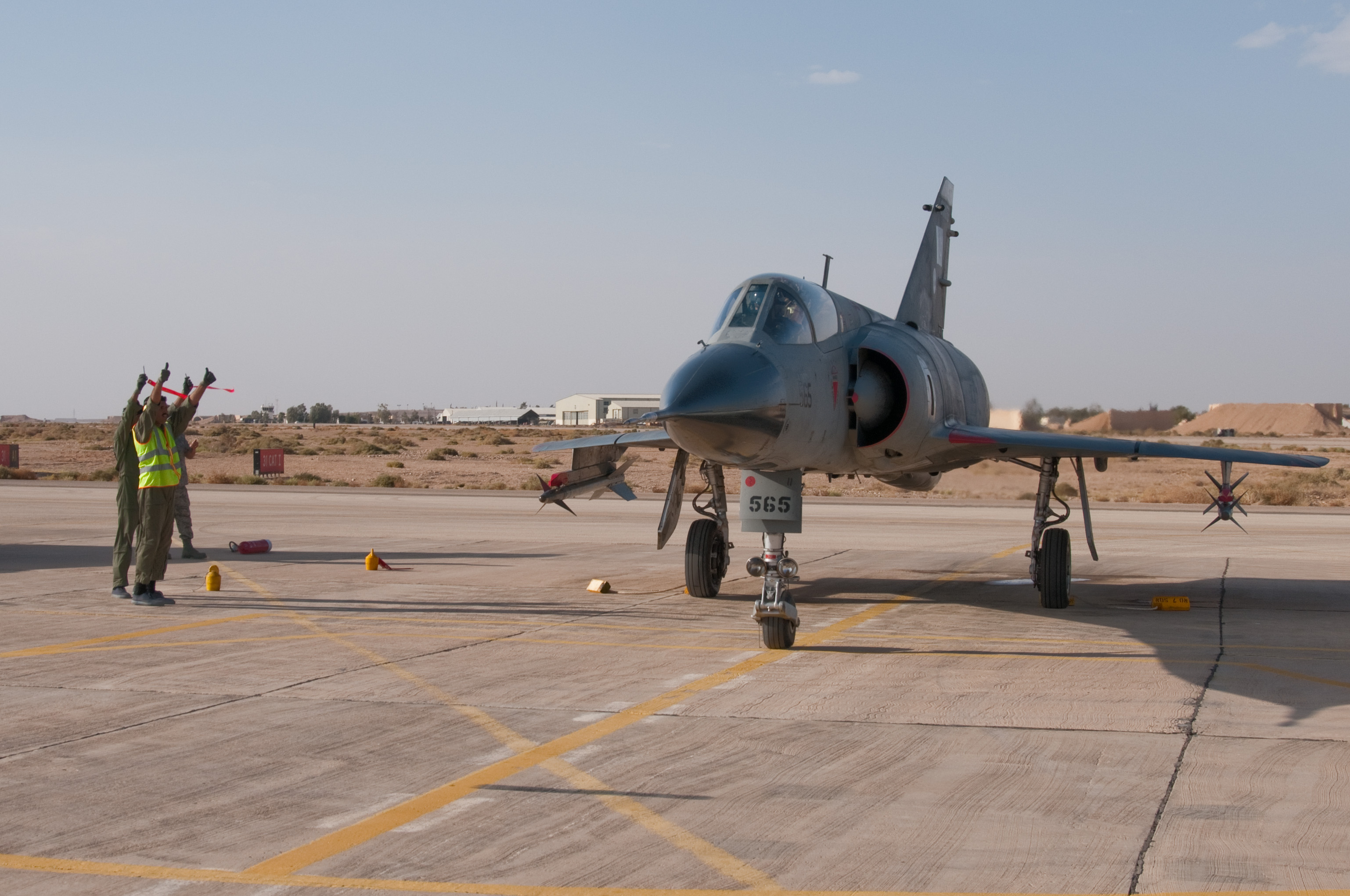
During Falcon Air Meet 2010 a Mirage III ROSE of No. 7 sqn competes in the alert scramble competition.

It was later decided to reequip the Bandits with Dassault Mirage IIIO fighters procured from Australia in 1991. The A-5C fleet was transferred to other A-5C squadrons at PAF Base Peshawar, and experienced Mirage pilots, referred to in the squadron history book as "the magnificent 7", were brought to No. 7 Squadron. Mirage III training flights began on 24 November 1991, after the first three aircraft had been delivered from PAC Kamra's Mirage overhaul facility. On 15 February 1993 the unit's equipment was swapped with that of No. 22 Squadron, an Operational Conversion Unit for Mirage III/5 fighters. The Bandits continued operating Mirages, but a role had not yet been assigned to them.

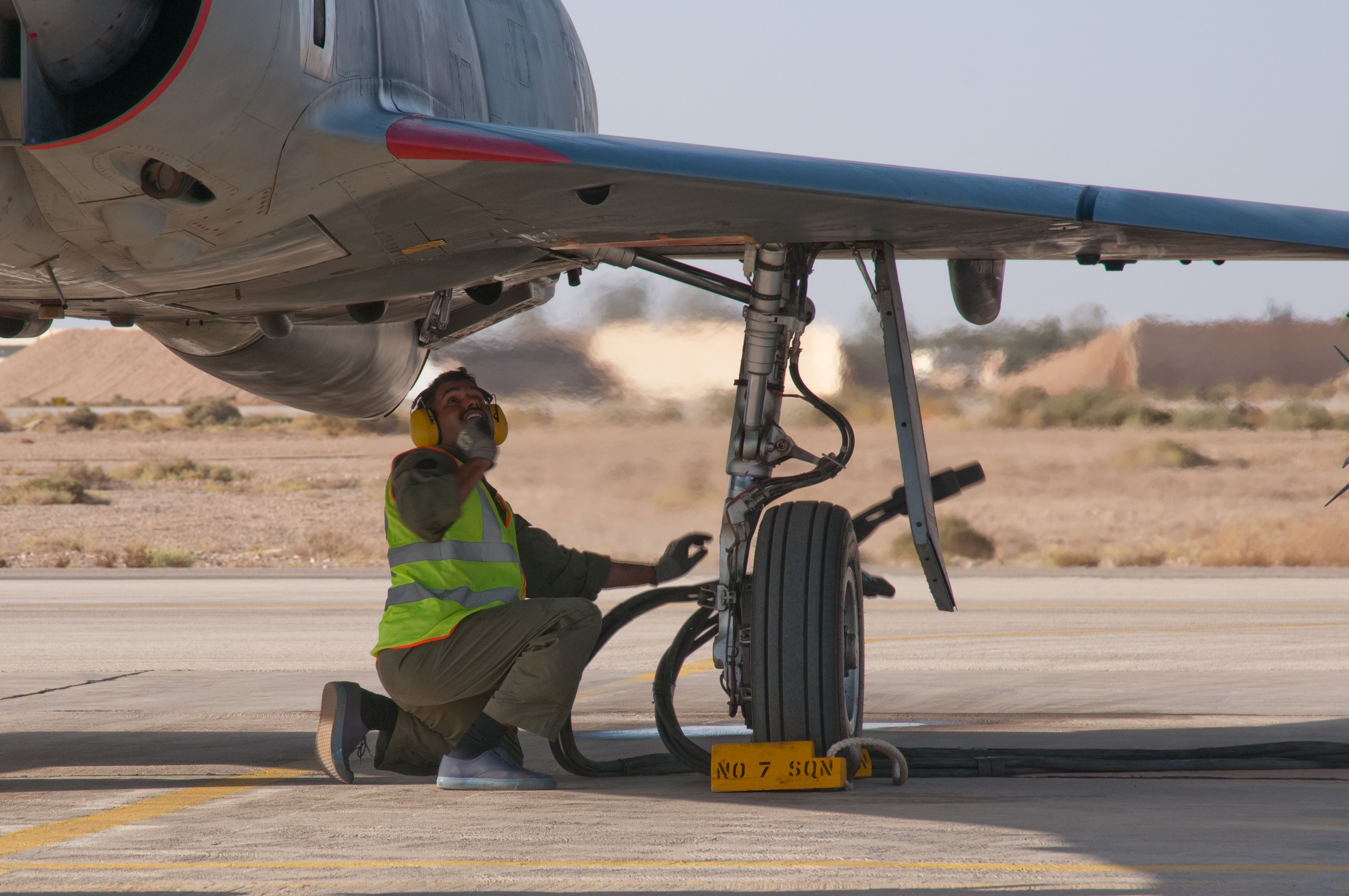

In 1997 the unit received the ex-Australian Mirage IIIO fighters, which had been upgraded under Project ROSE. These ROSE I fighters had been installed with new avionics, including FIAR Grifo M3 radar, which allowed the squadron's role to be changed from tactical attack to multi-role. Air-to-ground weapons delivery and other exercises were conducted, and the squadron was deployed over Balochistan for air defence prior to Pakistan's nuclear tests in 1998. Mirage of No 7 Squadron carried out the test of the Ra'ad missile.

In December, 2023 the Squadron was relocated from Air Force Station, Masroor to Air Force Station, Mushaf due to the disbanding of CCS Mirage Squadron. Now, No 7. Squadron is performing dual operations including Tactical Attack and CCS. The aircraft of CCS Mirage have been merged with No 7 TA Squadron. This operational requirement was a greater move in the history of No 7 TA Squadron. No 7 Squadron is the only fighter squadron in Pakistan Air Force which is presently commanded by a Female Officer Commanding and a Female SEO.

No. 7 Squadron Bandits
Role	Operational	Aircraft	Notes
Deep interdiction and strike	1960–1982	B-57 Canberra
Tactical Attack	1982–1988	Nanchang A-5C
	1989–1990	Nanchang A-5C
Operational Conversion Unit	1990–1991	Nanchang A-5C
Tactical Attack	1991–1993	Dassault Mirage III; Mirage IIIO
	1993–1997
Multi-role	1997—	Dassault Mirage IIIO ROSE I

== Exercises ==
- Saffron Bandit 92 – exercise held in November 1992.
- High Mark 93
- High Mark 95
- DACT camp 1995
- ISAC 96 – inter-squadron armament competition, squadron achieved 4th place overall.
- Falcon Air Meet 2010

== Gallery ==
The Bandits compete in the bombing competition at Falcon Air Meet 2010 in Jordan. Two 500 lb bombs are loaded on a Mirage III and a direct hit is achieved on the target.

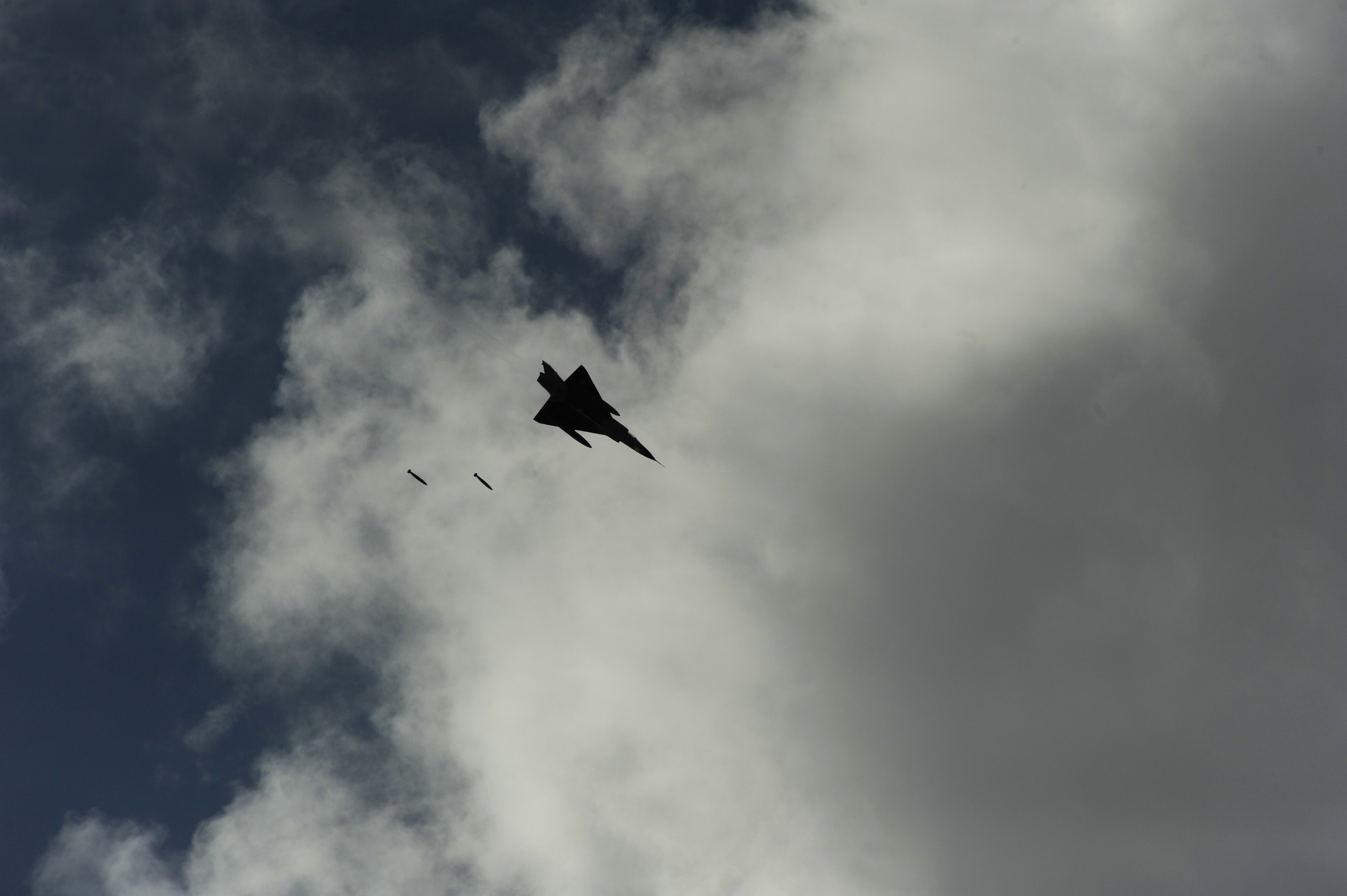

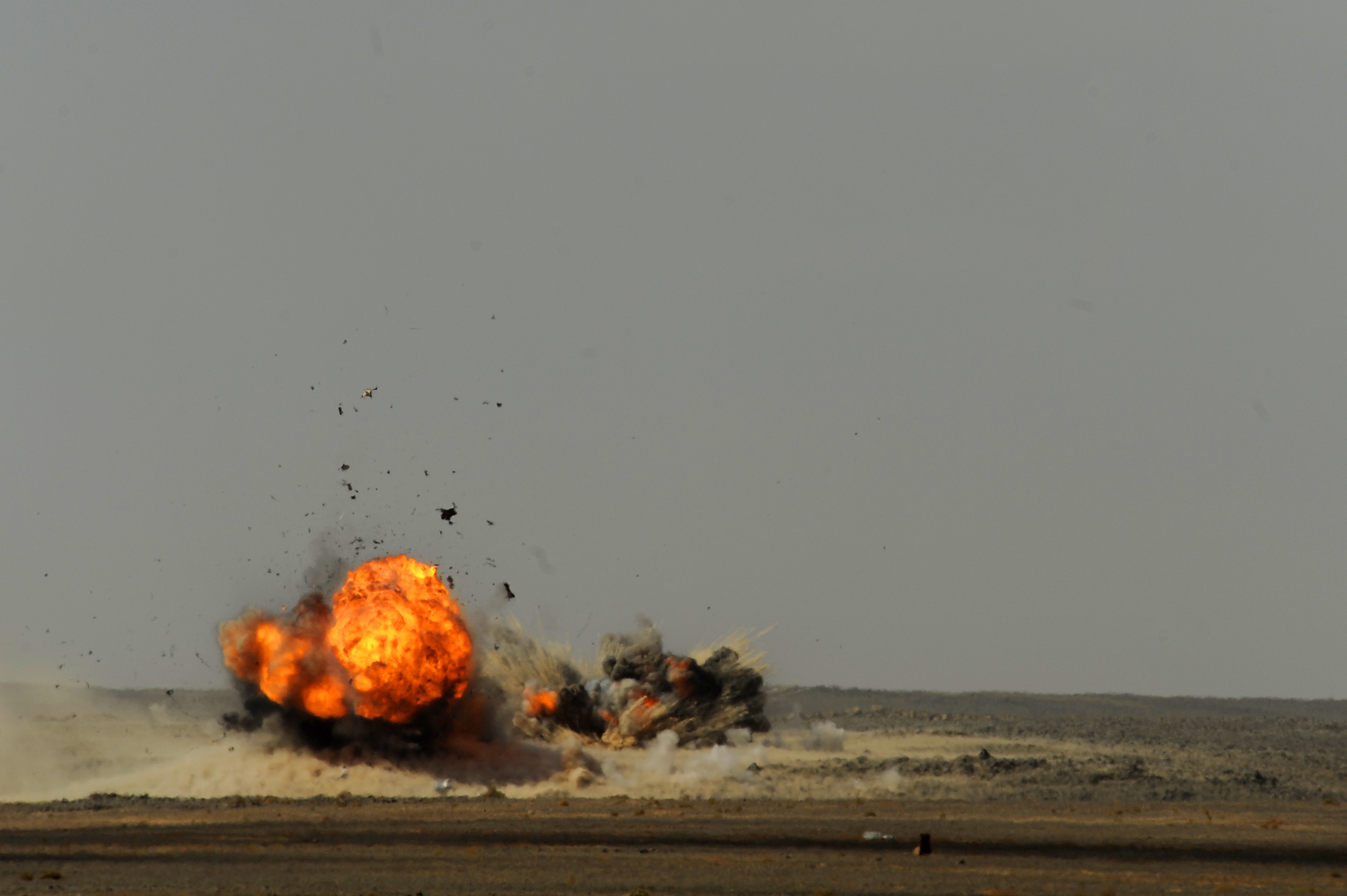

The squadron competes in the Alert Scramble competition and a Bandit flies in formation with other participants at Falcon Air Meet 2010, Azraq, Jordan.

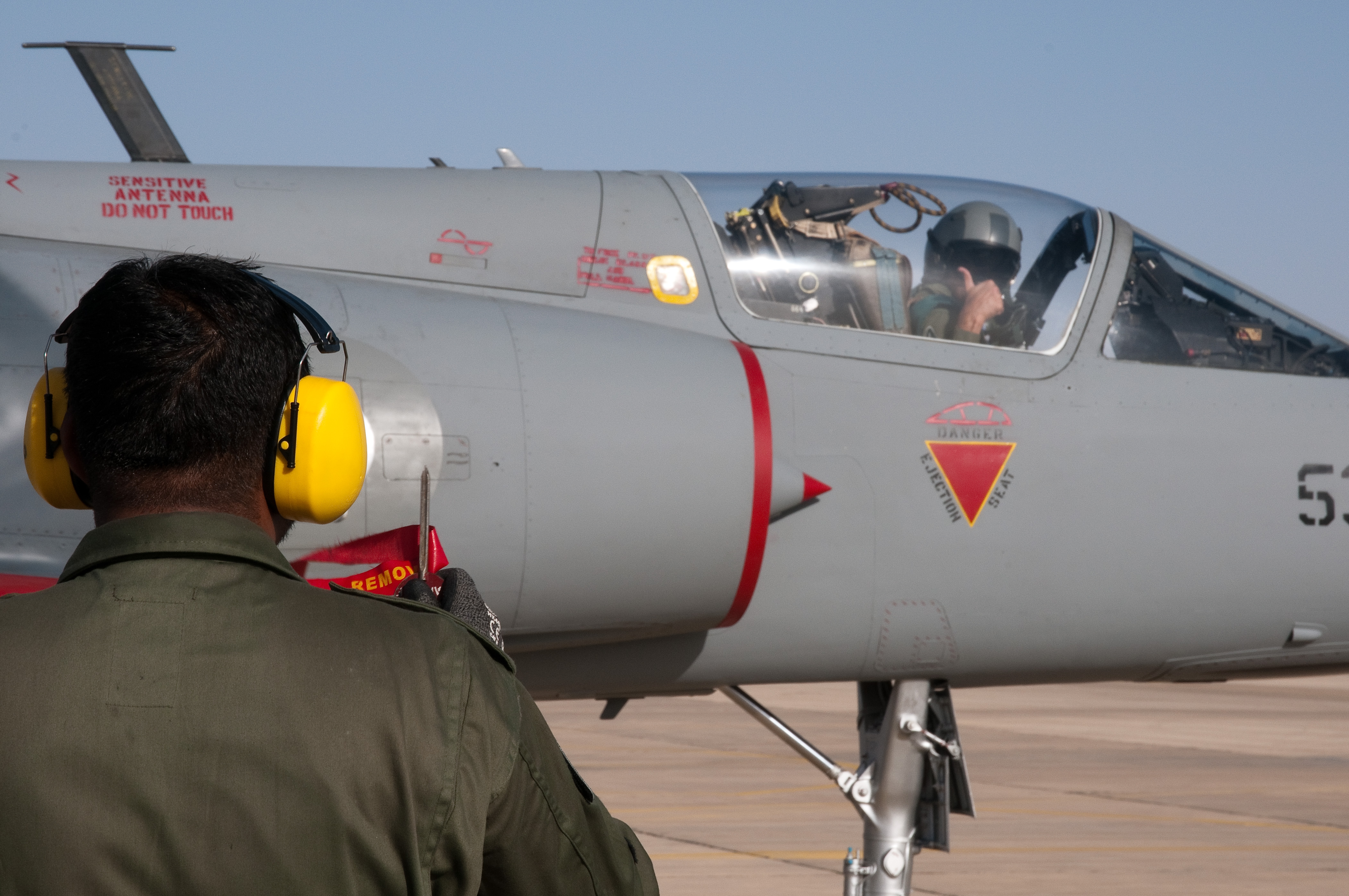
Alert Scramble Competition.

Alert Scramble Competition.

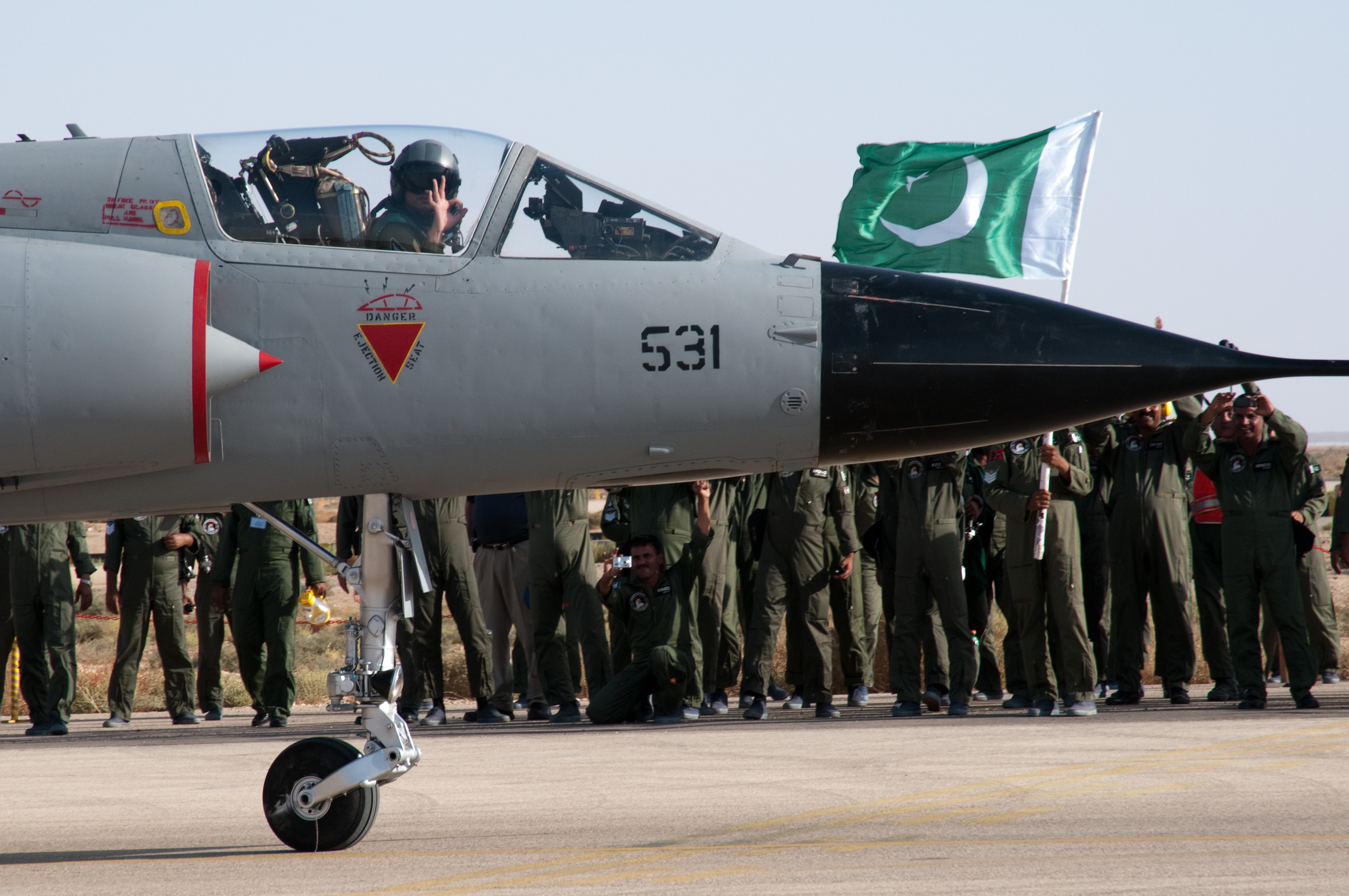
Alert Scramble Competition.

== See also ==
- List of Pakistan Air Force squadrons
- No. 8 Squadron (Pakistan Air Force)
- 8-Pass Charlie – A notable bomber pilot of the PAF during the 1965 war who was from the No. 7 Squadron.
