= 8-Pass Charlie =

Pakistani bomber pilot

Air Commodore Najeeb Ahmad Khan SJ TBt
- نجیب احمد خان
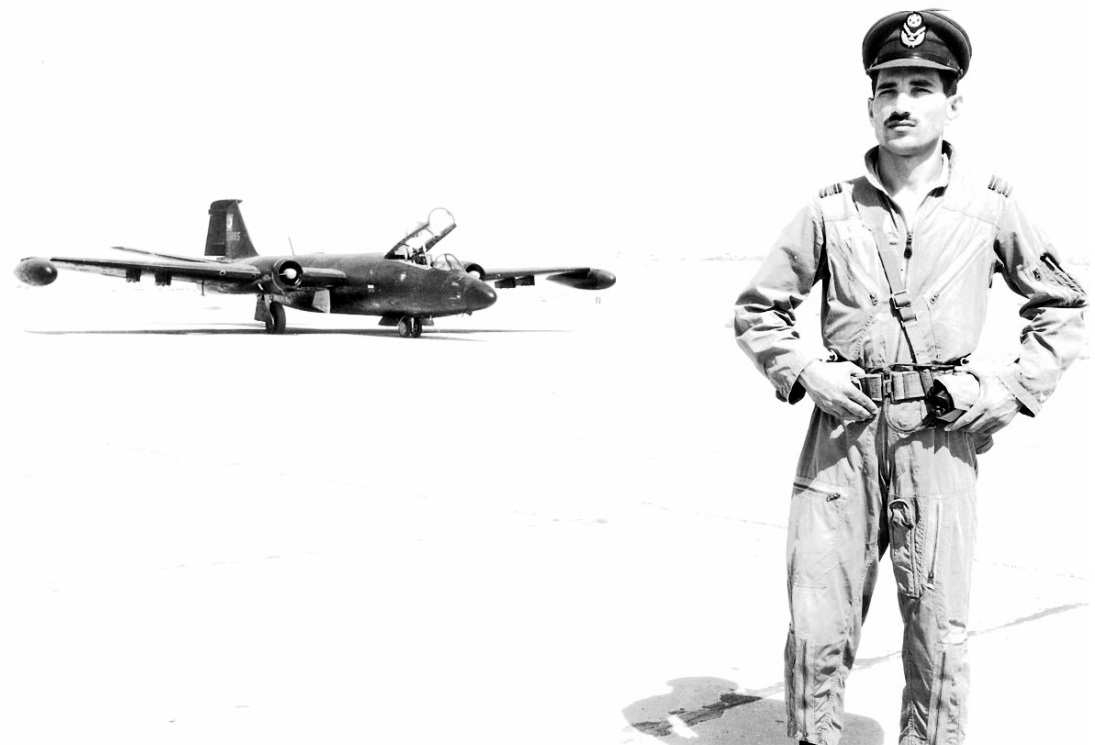
- Then Squadron Leader Najeeb A. Khan with his B-57 Canberra after a bombing mission over Ambala.

Personal details
- Born: 24 August 1933 (age 93) Kaimganj, British India
- Spouse: Surraya (m. 1964)
- Relations: Jamal A. Khan (Brother)
- Children: Babar Najeeb
- Parent: Israil Ahmed Khan (father)
- Nickname: 8-Pass Charlie

Military service
- Allegiance: Pakistan
- Branch/service: Pakistan Air Force
- Years of service: 1954–1981
- Rank: Air Commodore
- Unit: No. 2 Squadron "Minhasians"; No. 7 Squadron "Bandits"
- Commands: Base Commander of Malir Airbase; Air Attachè of Pakistan to France
- Battles/wars: Indo-Pakistani war of 1965; Air war operations; Indo-Pakistani War of 1971
- Awards: Sitara-e-Jurat; Tamgha-i-Basalat

Najeeb Ahmad Khan, commonly known as 8-Pass Charlie, was a Pakistani bomber pilot who raided the Adampur Airbase in India a number of times during the Indo-Pakistani War of 1965, notably starting a series of airstrikes on the base by a solo raid.

He was named "8-Pass Charlie" by his impressed Indian adversaries at the Adampur base as he used to make eight passes, one for each bomb, on selected targets with improving efficiency instead of safely dropping all of his bomb load and exiting. He is also known to have had expertise in disguising his attack run by confusing anti-aircraft gunners by cutting throttles before entering a dive.

== Early life and education ==
Najib was born in Kaimganj to Israil Ahmad Khan of the Afridi tribe of Pashtuns, from the Khyber Pakhtunkhwa province of Pakistan, on 24 August 1933. He was the older brother of Jamal Ahmed Khan. Najib received his primary education from Muslim High School, Bombay and upon migrating to Pakistan in 1949, where he settled in Lahore and completed his higher education.

== Career ==
Najib joined the Pakistan Air Force's 17th GD(P) course at Pakistan Air Force Academy in Risalpur and graduated on 6 June 1954. He was then posted to the PAF's No. 2 Squadron for Fighter Conversion Course. His brilliant performance in the conversion course led him to be selected for Advanced Jet Conversion Courses in the United States.

On his return to Pakistan, he served in various PAF squadrons. He was amongst the few pilots who were selected to fly the newly inducted B-57 Canberra bombers. In 1962, he was again sent to the United States for more Advanced Training Courses and after returning, he was posted as the Officer commanding (OC) of the 31st Tactical Attack wing's elite No. 7 Squadron which was based at Mauripur Airbase. In 1969, he was appointed as the Base commander of PAF Base Malir and later commanded the PAF's No. 15 Squadron "Cobras". During his tenure with the Squadron, Najeeb also assisted Chuck Yeager on a flight to Mount Godwin Austin and took some memorable pictures of him in a PAF F-86F over the mountain. In 1974, he attended Joint Warfare Courses at the UK and also graduated from PAF Staff College. As his last deployment, Najeeb was appointed as Pakistan's Air Attaché in France until finally retiring from the PAF on 20 June 1981.

=== 1965 War ===
Najib was serving as the commander of the No. 7 Squadron during the Indo-Pakistani War of 1965. Throughout the war, Najeeb participated in 17 strike missions deep inside enemy territory.

==== B-57 raids ====
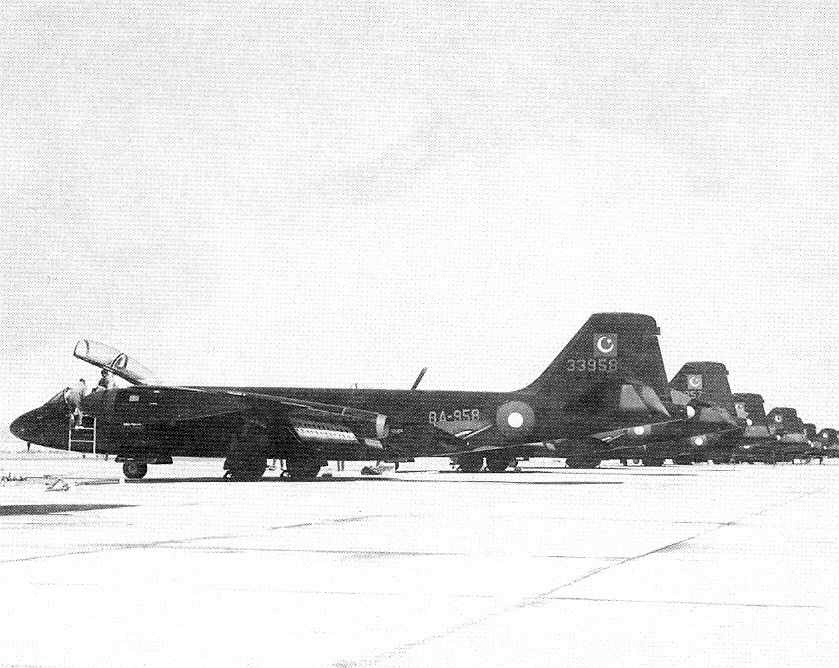
Pakistani B-57 Canberra bombers

During the war, the bomber wing of the PAF was attacking the concentration of airfields in north India. In order to avoid enemy fighter-bombers, the B-57s operated from several different airbases, taking off and returning to different bases to hop and avoid being attacked. The B-57 bombers would arrive over their targets in a stream at intervals of about 15 minutes, which led to achieving a major disruption of the overall IAF effort.

=== 1971 War ===
During the 1971 war, Najib served as the PSO of the PAF's Commander-in-chief, Air Marshal Abdul Rahim Khan.

== Named by adversaries ==
The name was assigned to this unknown pilot by his impressed Indian adversaries at the Adampur base, and appears to be derived from his daring routine of making eight passes in bombing runs during every air raid over the alerted airbase to bomb selected targets with each 500 lb bomb in the moonlight, "and tried to carry out an effective attack each time", instead of dropping his entire bomb-load of 4,000 lbs during the first pass which would have allowed a safer exit for the aggressor aircraft over initial defences.

== Kills ==
One of 8-Pass Charlie's confirmed kills is an Indian Air Force MiG 21s on Operational Readiness Platform (ORP) which was about to take off when he executed the first raid on the Adampur airbase at 2200 hours with his lone B-57 on 6 September, 1965.

== Technique ==
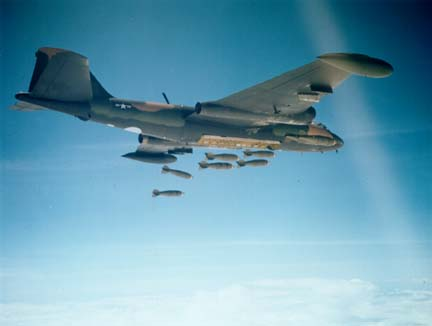
A B-57 dropping its full bomb load as a norm

In addition to his routine of making eight passes over Adampur, Najeeb also seemed to have had a second routine of conducting his raids thirty minutes after moonrise.

Paddy Earle, an Indian fighter pilot, paid tribute to the PAF pilot by saying:

I have the utmost respect for the Pakistani Canberra bloke who loved to ruin the equanimity of our dreary lives! 8-Pass Charlie was an ace, but he had this nasty habit of turning up about 30 min. after moonrise, just as we were downing our first drink! Seriously, he was a cool dude and a professional of the highest order. To disguise the direction of his run, he used to cut throttles before entering a dive and by the time the ack-ack opened up he was beneath the umbrella of fire. After dropping his load he'd apply full throttle and climb out above the umbrella.

== Sitara-e-Jurat citation ==
For his inspiring leadership, courage and other actions displayed during the 1965 war, Najeeb was awarded the Sitara-e-Jurat, the third highest gallantry award of Pakistan.

His Sitara-e-Jurat citation read as follows:

CITATION

Sqn Ldr Najeeb Ahmed Khan

7 SQUADRON PAK/3610

Squadron Leader Najeeb Ahmed Khan was commanding a Bomber Squadron during the Indo-Pakistan War. He flew 17 bombing missions against various Indian Air Force operational bases and led his Squadron with courage during the most hazardous raids on Ambala, Adampur, Jamnagar and Jodhpur. He carried out the raid on the well-defended airfield of Ambala deep in enemy territory at great personal risk. The attack was conducted with great accuracy and outstanding professional skills. By his example, he inspired confidence, determination and aggressiveness amongst personnel of his Squadron. For his outstanding courage, inspiring leadership and dedication to duty, he is awarded Sitara-i-Juraat.

== Personal life ==
Najeeb married Surraya on 14 October 1964 in London. The couple has a son named Babar (b. 1971). Soon after retiring from the PAF, he took residence in Canada and continues to live there with his family. Najeeb's younger brother, Air Chief Marshal Jamal Ahmed Khan, later went on to command the Pakistan Air Force. Both of them are the only brothers to be awarded the Sitara-e-Jurat.

== See also ==
- Sarfaraz Ahmed Rafiqui
- Saiful Azam
- Muhammad Mahmood Alam
