= List of Indian Air Force Gallantry Award winners =

This is a list of Indian Air Force personnel who have received awards for gallantry related to their service.

== Param Vir Chakra ==
- Nirmal Jit Singh Sekhon

== Maha Vir Chakra ==
- Harcharan Singh Manget
- Ajjamada B. Devaiah
- SK Kaul
- Ramesh Sakharam Benegal
- Man Mohan Bir Singh Talwar
- Madhavendra Banerji
- Harcharan Singh Manget
- Cecil Vivian Parker
- Chandan Singh
- Ravinder Nath Bhardwaj
- Padmanabh Gautam (awarded twice, in 1965 and 1971)
- Jag Mohan Nath (awarded twice, in 1962 and 1965)
- Hrushikesh Moolgavkar
- Minoo Merwan Engineer
- Mehar Singh

== Vir Chakra ==
- Amar Jit Singh Sandhu
- Jasjit Singh (IAF officer)
- Ranjan Dutt
- Alfred Tyrone Cooke
- Krishan Kant Saini
- Trevor Keelor
- Denzil Keelor
- Lawrence Frederic Pereira
- Virendera Singh Pathania
- Ajay Ahuja
- Abhinandan Varthaman
- Vinod Neb (Received twice (bar to VrC). Once in 1965 and 1971.)
- Manish Arora

== Ashoka Chakra ==
- Suhas Biswas
- Rakesh Sharma
- Jyoti Prakash Nirala

== Kirti Chakra ==
- Denzil Keelor
- Dev Raj Singh Thakur
- Darryl Castelino

== Shaurya Chakra ==
- Varun Singh (Indian Air Force Officer)
- Gursewak Singh

== Vayu Sena Medal ==
(This list is not complete)

- Virendera Singh Pathania
