= List of aerial victories during the Indo-Pakistani war of 1965 =

The Indo-Pakistani air war of 1965 was a military confrontation between India and Pakistan that occurred after the failure of Operation Gibraltar in Jammu and Kashmir on 1 September 1965. Pakistan Air Force under Operation Grand Slam and Indian Airforce under Operation Riddle engaged with each other with the last aerial combat taking place on 23 September 1965.

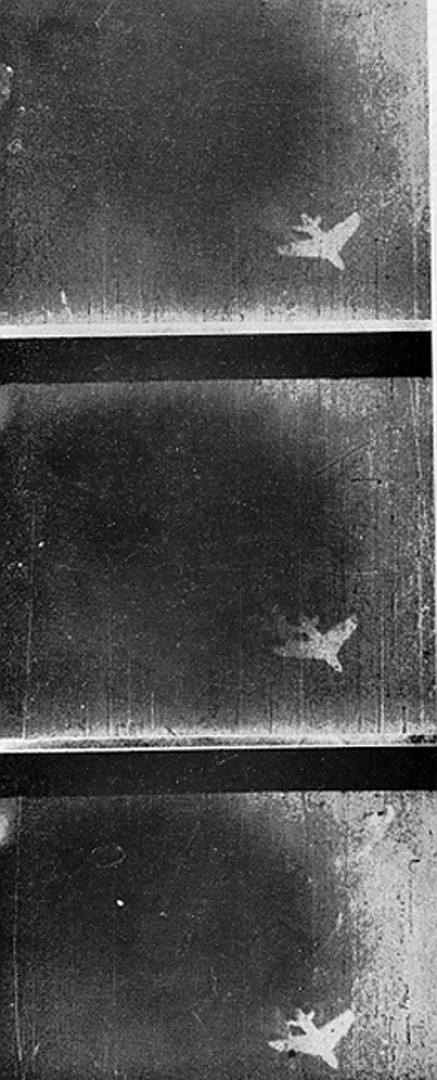
Gun camera film from a F-86F Sabre of No. 26 Squadron PAF shows the last moments of an IAF Hawker Hunter before being shot down over Lahore District.

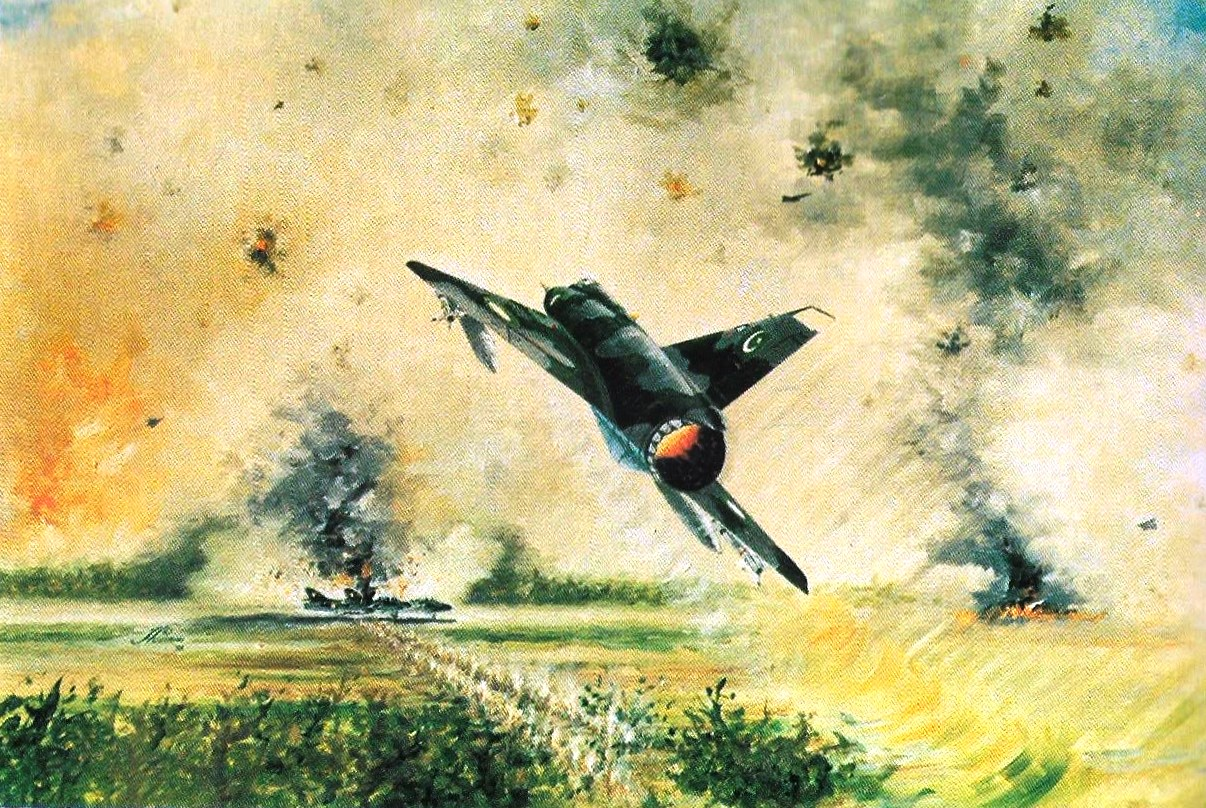
From the gallery of 350 paintings by Rtd Grp Capt Syed Masood Akhtar Hussaini, Tamgha-e-Bisalat, Member American Society of Aviation Artists

The sides claimed various numbers of kills and casualties. India claims to have lost 35–59 aircraft while Pakistan claims to have destroyed 110–113; neutral sources claim that India lost 60–75 aircraft. Pakistan claims to have lost 19 aircraft while India claims 42–73 kills; neutral sources say Pakistan lost 20 aircraft.

== Aerial victories ==
The following lists contains aerial victories credited to both Indian as well as Pakistani pilots.

Flag of Air Chief Marshal Indian Air Force	Air Force Ensign of India	Badge of the Pakistan Air Force	Air Force Ensign of Pakistan	Flag of Air Marshal Pakistan Air Force

Pilot	Pilot‘s Squadron	Country	Date	Fighter Type	Victim Pilot	Victim Pilot‘s Squadron	Victim Aircraft	Remarks
Sqn Ldr Sarfaraz Ahmed Rafiqui	No. 5 Squadron PAF	Pakistan	1 Sep Air War over Chumb	F-86	Flt Lt Shrikrishna Vishnu Phatak (wingman)	No. 45 Squadron IAF	de Havilland Vampire	Phatak bailed out, Rafiqui awarded Sitara-e-Jurat
Sqn Ldr Sarfaraz Ahmed Rafiqui	No. 5 Squadron PAF	Pakistan	1 Sep Air War over Chumb	F-86	Squadron Leader Aspi Kekobad Bhagwagar (flight leader)	No. 45 Squadron IAF	de Havilland Vampire	Bhagwagar KIA
Flt Lt Imtiaz Bhatti	No. 15 Squadron PAF	Pakistan	1 Sep Air War over Chumb	F-86	Flight Lieutenant Satish Bharadwaj (element wingman)	No. 45 Squadron IAF	de Havilland Vampire	Bharadwaj KIA
Flt Lt Imtiaz Bhatti	No. 15 Squadron PAF	Pakistan	1 Sep Air War over Chumb	F-86	Flight Lieutenant Vijay Madhav Joshi (element leader)	No. 45 Squadron IAF	de Havilland Vampire	Joshi KIA Bhatti awarded Sitara-e-Jurat
Sqn Ldr Trevor Keelor	No. 23 Squadron IAF	India	3 Sep Air War over Chicken's Neck (Pakistan) Akhnoor	Folland Gnat	Flt Lt Yousuf Ali Khan	No. 11 Squadron PAF	F-86	Trevor awarded 1st Vir Chakra of war. Khan awarded Sitara-e-Jurat for surviving the dogfight against six Gnats and nursing the damaged Sabre back home.
Flt Lt Virendera Singh Pathania	No. 23 Squadron IAF	India	4 Sep Air War over Chicken's Neck (Pakistan) Akhnoor	Folland Gnat	Flt Lt N.M Butt	No. 15 Squadron PAF	F-86	Butt bailed out, Pathania awarded the Vir Chakra.
Flt Lt Hakimullah Khan Durrani	No. 9 Squadron PAF	Pakistan	4 Sep Pasrur	Lockheed F-104 Starfighter	Sqn Ldr Brij Pal Singh Sikand	No. 23 Squadron IAF	Folland Gnat	Starfighter forced the Gnat to land mistakenly at an abandoned airstrip. Durrani awarded Tamgha-e-Diffa and Sitara-e-Basalat
Sqn Ldr MM Alam / Syed Saad Akhtar Hatmi	No. 11 Squadron PAF / No. 18 Squadron PAF	Pakistan	6 Sep Taran Taran	F-86	Sqn Ldr Peter Rawley	No. 7 Squadron IAF	Hawker Hunter	Aborted Halwara base attack at Taran Taran, Rawley misjudged his turn at low levels during the engagement and went into the ground, KIA. Hatmi awarded the kill disputed by Alam.
Flg Offr Adi Rustomji Ghandhi	No. 7 Squadron IAF	India	6 Sep Halwara Air Force Station	Hawker Hunter	Sqn Ldr Sarfaraz Ahmed Rafiqui	No. 5 Squadron PAF	F-86	Vir Chakra awarded to Ghandhi for hitting Rafiqui and another plane.
Flt Lt Yunus Hussain	No. 5 Squadron PAF	Pakistan	6 Sep Halwara Air Force Station	F86	Fg Offr Adi Rustomji Ghandhi	No. 7 Squadron IAF	Hawker Hunter	Ghandhi bailed out, Yunus's kill disputed by Cecil Chaudhry (Note: The specified timestamps for reference are 16:25-18:10, 20:26-21:07, and 29:00-31:17 in the podcast.)
Sqn Ldr Sarfaraz Ahmed Rafiqui	No. 5 Squadron PAF	India	6 Sep Halwara Air Force Station	F-86	Flg Offr Air Marshal Prakash Sadashivrao Pingale	No. 7 Squadron IAF	Hawker Hunter	Pingale bailed out
Flg Off Vinod Neb	No. 27 Squadron IAF	India	6 Sep Halwara Air Force Station	Hawker Hunter	Flt Lt Yunus Hussain	No. 5 Squadron PAF	F-86	Yunus posthumously awarded Sitara-e-Jurat, Neb awarded Vir Chakra
Flt Lt Dev Nath Rathore	No. 27 Squadron IAF	India	6 Sep Halwara Air Force Station	Hawker Hunter	Sqn Ldr Sarfaraz Ahmed Rafiqui	No. 5 Squadron PAF	F-86	Rafiqui posthumously awarded Hilal-e-Jurat, Rathore awarded Vir Chakra.
Sqn Ldr Ajjamada B. Devaiah	No. 1 Squadron IAF	India	7 Sep Sargodha Airfield Complex	Dassault Mystère IV	Flt Lt Amjad Hussain	No. 9 Squadron PAF	Lockheed F-104 Starfighter	Both planes crashed, Devaiah KIA awarded Mahavir Chakra 23 years after war.
Sqn Ldr MM Alam	No. 11 Squadron PAF	Pakistan	7 Sep Sargodha Airfield Complex	F-86	Flt Lt ‘Piloo’ Kacker	No. 27 Squadron IAF	Hawker Hunter	Kill disputed, crashed due to ack, ack fuel loss, Kacker became POW
Flt Lt Anwar-ul-Haq Malik	No. 26 Squadron PAF	Pakistan	7 Sep Sargodha Airfield Complex	F-86 AAMs	Flt Lt U.Babul Guha	No. 1 Squadron IAF	Dassault Mystère IV	KIA
Sqn Ldr MM Alam	No. 11 Squadron PAF	Pakistan	7 Sep Sargodha Airfield Complex	F-86	Sqn Ldr S C Bhagwat	No. 7 Squadron IAF	Hawker Hunter	KIA Alam conferred Sitara-e-Jurat, Tamgha-e-Diffa, Sitara-e-Imtiaz
Sqn Ldr MM Alam	No. 11 Squadron PAF	Pakistan	7 Sep Sargodha Airfield Complex	F-86	Fg Offr Jagdev Singh Brar	No. 7 Squadron IAF	Hawker Hunter	Brar KIA
Flt Lt Alfred Tyrone Cooke	No. 14 Squadron IAF	India	7 Sep Kalaikunda Air Force Station	Hawker Hunter	Flying officer Afzal Khan	No. 14 Squadron PAF	F-86	Khan KIA, Cooke awarded Vir Chakra
Fg Offr Subodh Chandra Mamgain	No. 14 Squadron IAF	India	7 Sep Kalaikunda Air Force Station	Hawker Hunter	Flight Lieutenant Tariq Habib (Leader)	No. 14 Squadron PAF	F-86	Mamgain awarded Vir Chakra for one hit and one unconfirmed kill.
Flt Lt Yousuf Ali Khan	No. 11 Squadron PAF	Pakistan	13 Sep Katron, Sangroor	F-86	Flt Lt Arvind Kale	No. 2 Squadron IAF	Folland Gnat	Kale bailed out.
Flt Lt Imtiaz Bhatti	No. 15 Squadron PAF	Pakistan	13 Sep PAF Base Sargodha	F-86	Sqn Ldr N K Malik	No. 2 Squadron IAF	Folland Gnat	Pilot nursed Gnat back to India but died next day, Bhatti awarded with hit
Sqn Ldr Bharat Singh	No. 2 Squadron IAF	India	14 Sep Khem Karan Sector	Folland Gnat		Unidentified	F-86	Indian Army confirmed wreckage and Singh awarded Vir Chakra, PAF pilot nursed hit plane safely to ground.
Flg Offr Prakash Sadashivrao Pingale	No. 7 Squadron IAF	India	16 Sep	Hawker Hunter	Fg Offr M Shaukat	No. 11 Squadron PAF	F-86	Pingale awarded Vir Chakra
Sqn Ldr MM Alam	No. 11 Squadron PAF	Pakistan	16 Sep	F-86	Flg Offr Farokh Dara Bunsha	No. 7 Squadron IAF	Hawker Hunter	Bunsha KIA
Flt Lt Amar Jit Singh Sandhu	No. 23 Squadron IAF	India	18 Sep Pathankot Air Force Station	Folland Gnat	Flt Lt Syed Saad Akhtar Hatmi	No. 18 Squadron PAF	F-86	Sandhu awarded Vir Chakra Hatmi bailed out and awarded Sitara-e-Jurat, flew the captured plane to Sargodha from Pasrur.
Flt Lt Saiful Azam Bangladesh Air Force (BAF)	No. 17 Squadron PAF	Pakistan	19 SepSargodha Airfield Complex	F-86	Flt Lt Maya Dev	No. 9 Squadron IAF	Folland Gnat	Dev bailed out and became POW, Azam awarded Sitara-e-Jurat
Flt Lt Denzil Keelor	No. 9 Squadron IAF	India	19 Sep Tezpur Air Force Station	Folland Gnat	Wg Cdr Syed Mohammad Ahmed	No. 14 Squadron PAF	F-86	Ahmad bailed out, Keelor awarded Vir Chakra Ahmed awarded Sitara-i-Basalat
Flt Lt Ajay Kumar Mazumdar	No. 2 Squadron IAF	India	20 Sep Lahore	Folland Gnat	Flt Lt Anwar-ul-Haq Malik	No. 26 Squadron PAF	F-86	PAF pilot bailed out. Mazumdar awarded Vir Chakra
Squadron Leader Sharbat Ali Changezi	No. 26 Squadron PAF	Pakistan	20 Sep Lahore	F-86	Squadron Leader S K Sharma	No. 7 Squadron IAF	Hawker Hunter	Sharma bailed out Changezi awarded Tamgha-e-Basalat
Flt Lt Syed Nazir Ahmed Jilani	No. 26 Squadron PAF	Pakistan	20 Sep Lahore	F-86	Squadron Leader Deba Prasad Chatterjee	No. 7 Squadron IAF	Hawker Hunter	Chatterjee KIA Jilani awarded Tamgha-e-Basalat
Flt Lt Jamal A. Khan	No. 9 Squadron PAF	Pakistan	21 Sep Fazilka	Lockheed F-104 Starfighter Sidewinder AIM-9B	Flt Lt Manmohan Lowe Fg Offr Kewal Krishan Kapur	No. 5 Squadron IAF	English Electric Canberra	Lowe bailed out, Kapur KIA, Afridi awarded Sitara-e-Jurat

Indian Aircraft	Country of origin
Aérospatiale Alouette III	France
Bréguet Br.1050 Alizé	France
Dassault Mystère IV	France
de Havilland Vampire	United Kingdom
English Electric Canberra	United Kingdom
Folland Gnat	United Kingdom
Hawker Hunter	United Kingdom
HAL HF-24 Marut	India
HAL Krishak	India
Mikoyan-Gurevich MiG-21FL	USSR
Sukhoi Su-7BMK	USSR

Pakistan Aircraft	Country of origin
Canadair Sabre	Canada
Cessna O-1 Bird Dog	USA
Dassault Mirage III	France
Lockheed F-104 Starfighter	USA
North American F-86 Sabre	USA
Shenyang F6C	China
