= Virendera Singh Pathania =

Indian Air Force fighter pilot (1937 - 1995)

Group Captain Virendera Singh Pathania VrC, VM
- Bhotti
- Born: Virendera Singh Pathania; 6 November 1937; Village Rey Khas, Tehsil Fatehpur, District Kangra, H.P India; Punjab Province (British India)
- Died: 20 February 1995 (aged 57); New Delhi
- Spouse: Asha Pathania
- Children: Trigun Pathania; Karan Pathania; Preeti Pathania
- Military career
- Allegiance: India
- Branch: Indian Air Force
- Service years: 37 years From 25 August 1956 to 9 December 1993
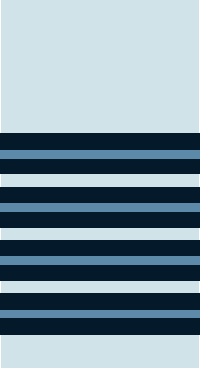
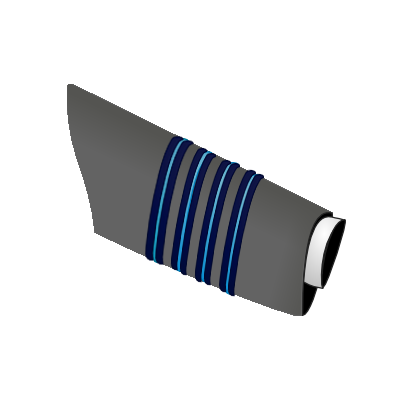
- Rank: Group Captain
- Nickname: PAT
- Service number: 5198 F(P)
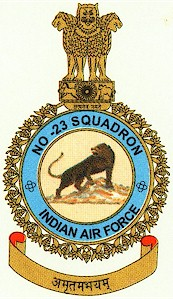
- Units: No.23 Squadron Black Panther; No.18 Squadron Flying Bullets
- Conflicts: Sino-Indian War; Indo-Pakistani War of 1965; Indo-Pakistani War of 1971
- Awards: Vir Chakra; Vayu Sena Medal

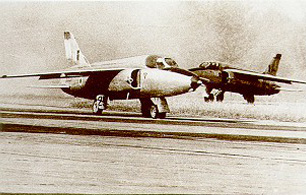
An Indian Air Force Folland Gnat jet in 1971

Group Captain Virendera Singh Pathania, VrC, VM, was an Indian Air Force (IAF) fighter pilot reputed for making the first confirmed aerial dogfight kill of independent India when he shot down a Pakistan Air Force (PAF) Sabre Jet with his Folland Gnat on 4 September 1965. For this action, he was awarded the Vir Chakra.

== Biography ==
During the Sino-Indian War, the IAF was only involved in a supportive capacity. Flight Lieutenant Virendera Singh Pathania of No. 23 Squadron IAF made sorties on the perforated steel-plated Chushul airport for photo-reconnaissance.

Indo-Pakistani Air War of 1965 began on 1 September 1965 and PAF dominated the skies with their F-86 and F-104, making 4 kills of IAF Vampire planes on the very first day. However their supremacy was overshadowed when on 3 September 1965 a Sabre was hit and a Starfigher had to leave the skies after it was attacked by Pathania who said on his radio "We part to meet again," Air Marshal Arjun Singh on that day remarked on that day's event that tyranny of PAF is over and 'Sabre slayers' were born leading Pakistani intelligence to hurriedly label Gnats as most dangerous. Amar Jit Singh Sandhu, Johnny Greene, Trevor Keelor, Denzil Keelor, Virendera Singh Pathania became Sabre Slayers and were awarded Vir Chakras.

During the Indo-Pakistani War of 1965, he was awarded the Vir Chakra for shooting down F-86 with his Folland Gnat jet on 4 September. List of aerial victories during the Indo-Pakistani war of 1965 has enlisted the kill. Pakistani officer N.M Butt of F-86 PAF ejected safely and the wreckage of Sabre Jet was recovered near Akhnoor Bridge in Jammu and Kashmir. IAF declared it as the second kill of independent India.

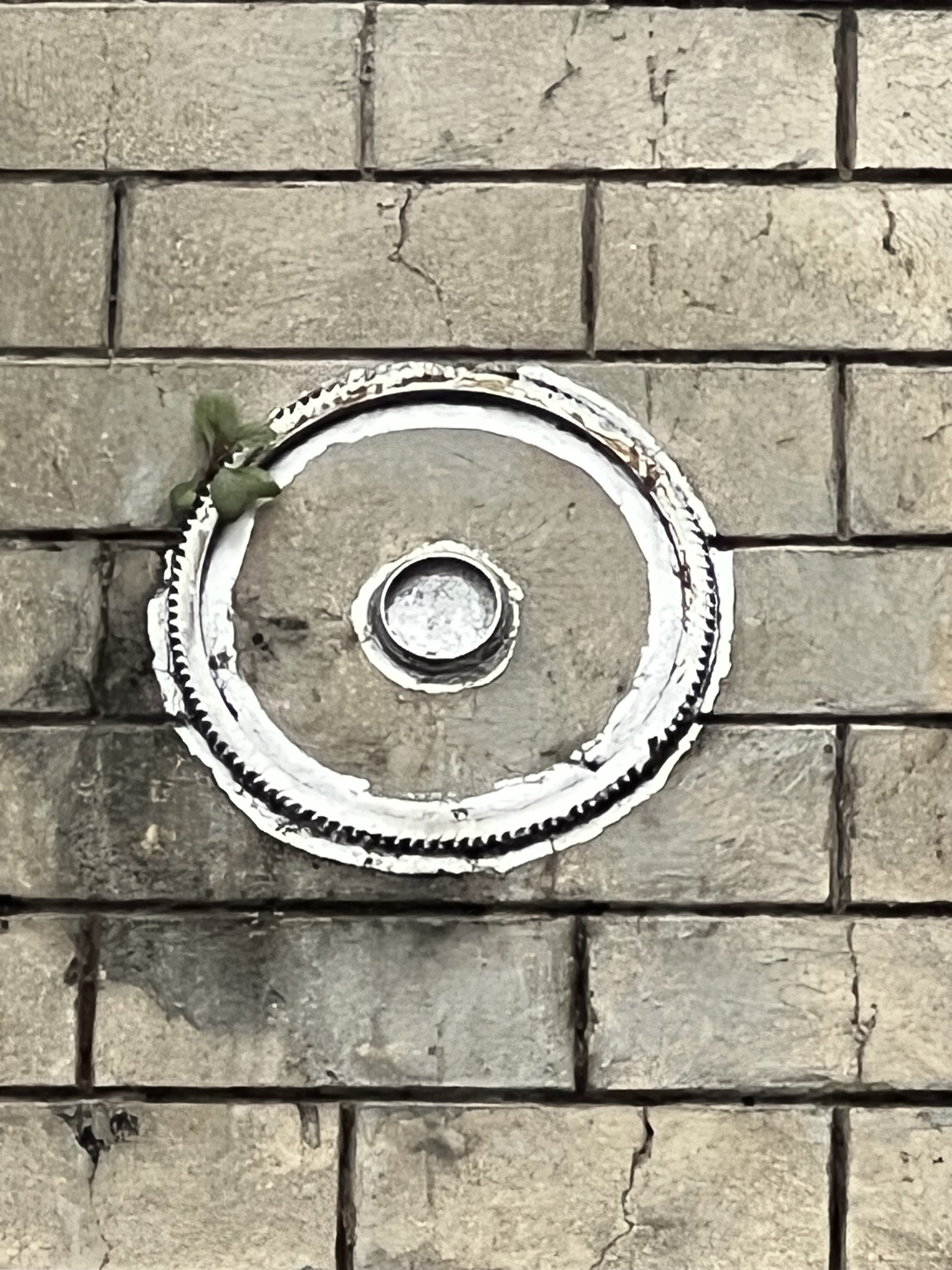
War relic comprising a metal component of an F-86 Sabre jet, shot down on 4 September 1965, and mounted on the wall of the shooter.

However PAF recognizes 4 September 1965 as first kill by Pathania after it disputed the 3 September kill of Trevor Keelor for which Pakistan claims that damaged F-86 managed to land safely at Sargodha air base and awarded Sitara-e-Jurat to Wing Commander then Flight Lieutenant Yusuf Ali Khan who later made 1 kill in the war.

On 6 December of the Indo-Pakistani War of 1971, Squadron Leader Pathania of No. 18 Squadron IAF and Flying Officer Boppayya scrambled an incoming raid by four F-86 aircraft by intercepting their course in Srinagar.

On 14 December 1971, he was awarded the Vayu Sena Medal for his commanding lead of Air Traffic Control (ATC) while Flying Officer Nirmal Jit Singh Sekhon PVC single-handedly engaged in a suicidal dogfight with six F-86 Sabre Jet Pakistani airplanes in Srinagar while deterring attackers from their prime targets.

Two days later after the death of Flying Officer Nirmal Jit Singh Sekhon on 16 December 1971, Pathania made an unconfirmed kill of an F-86 on the day of Pakistan Army's Eastern Command's surrender, marking it as last and lone kill entry by Gnat in western sector among the List of aerial victories during the Indo-Pakistani War of 1971.

== In popular culture ==
- A Docu-Drama The Air Battle of Srinagar presented by Maj. Gen. G.D. Bakshi portrays his character by Shaurya Singh on Epic TV in 2017.
- The surname Pathania and nickname Patty of the lead character in the historical fiction Hindi movie "Fighter (2024 film)" played by Hrithik Roshan as IAF ace fighter pilot portrays his name.
