= No. 26 Squadron IAF =

Indian Air Force flying squadron

No. 26 Squadron
- Active: 1 January 1968 – unknown
- Country: Republic of India
- Branch: Indian Air Force
- Role: Fighter
- Garrison/HQ: Pathankot AFS
- Nickname: "Warriors"
- Mottos: Yudhyasva Vigatha Jwar; Wage war with all efforts

Aircraft flown
- Fighter: MiG-21 bis

No. 26 Squadron IAF (Warriors) is the Ground Attack and Close Air Support unit of the Indian Air Force, operating from Pathankot Air Force Station under India's Western Air Command. The squadron was number plated on an unspecified date.

== History ==
=== Formation ===
No. 26 Squadron was formed on 1 January 1968 at Adampur, under Wing Commander M.M. Singh. It was the first squadron to operate the Sukhoi Su-7 aircraft. Until 1971, the squadron was a type-training squadron, helping other squadrons to convert to the Su-7. It played an active role in the Indo-Pakistani War of 1971. No. 26 Squadron's primary role was to fly Close Air Support (CAS) missions with 8 Tactical Air Command (TAC). It also flew several sorties with 6 TAC. Most operations were in an area known as the Bulge, bounded by Samba in the north, Pathankot in the east, and Dera Baba Nanak in the south.

=== 1971 Indo-Pakistani War ===
The aircrew of No. 26 Squadron were briefed for operations at 04:00 hours on the morning of 4 December 1971, as part of India's response to a series of pre-emptive strikes on Indian airfields by the Pakistani Air Force (PAF). Among its sorties, No. 26 Squadron sent four aircraft to strike Chandhar Air Force Base early that morning. At dusk, four aircraft were sent to strike a suspected radar site at Walton Airfield.

On 5 December, after a briefing at 04:30 hours, the squadron flew missions for 6 TAC in the Lahore sector. Squadron Leader Sahin took damage on one sortie, forcing him to land at Pathankot. During the last strike of the day, Squadron Leader Jaffa was shot down. He ejected from an inverted aircraft, but landed inside Pakistani territory and was captured. On 6 December, the squadron flew several missions against dug-in and well-prepared Pakistani positions in the Bulge. On 7 December, Squadron Leader Jiwa Singh, the squadron's Senior Flight Commander, was shot down over Jafarwal at 10:15 hours, and lost contact with ground control. Later that day, it was reported that an Su-7, probably commanded by Singh, had been shot down by an F-104 Starfighter and the pilot killed. On 8 December, after a briefing at 06:30 hours, No. 26 Squadron flew several CAS missions with no losses. But losses over the preceding days had reduced the squadron to 13 pilots and just 11 aircraft.

On 9 December, No. 26 Squadron began flying missions with MiG 21 escorts, in response to increased PAF activity in the Bulge. The squadron flew several missions against Pakistani positions in the Bulge. Flight Lieutenant (Flt Lt) Kadam was reported missing after an attack on Rissalwala Airfield. On 10 December, the squadron flew 10 CAS sorties in the Bulge, and Flt Lt Parulkar went missing after a strike over Zafarwal. On 11 December, flying over Nurkot, three aircraft of the squadron encountered six PAF Sabres. Two aircraft returned undamaged, but Ft Lt K.K.Mohan was reported missing. On 12 December, the squadron flew 12 CAS sorties, without mishap beyond occasional Pakistani jamming of their communications. No. 26 Squadron flew fewer sorties as the war drew to close. Only eight were flown on 13 December.

On 14 December, fighting in Shakargarh intensified, and the squadron flew 14 sorties. Its Forward Air Controller, Flt Lt Lawrence Pereira, was seriously injured by strafing runs, and died from his injuries. On 15 December, No. 26 Squadron acquired S-24 rockets, which it used to attack the Sulemanki Headworks. On 16 December, after the surrender of the Pakistani forces in Dhaka, the squadron flew a mission against the Normal Railway Yard. It flew into heavy anti-aircraft fire. Flt Lt Dandass was shot down, and his aircraft exploded on the ground. That evening, the Prime Minister of India, Indira Gandhi, ordered a unilateral ceasefire on the western front. On 17 December, only 12 sorties were flown. A cessation of all air strikes was ordered at 16:00 hours that evening.

=== Post-War ===
No. 26 Squadron has received several trophies as best squadron in India's Western Air Command.

In June 1977, the squadron was re-equipped with MiG 21BIS aircraft. It is the only IAF squadron still flying the legacy MiG-21bis fighters (all other MiG-21bis squadrons upgraded to the MiG-21 Bison).

No. 26 Squadron took part in the 50-squadron flypast in 1982, commemorating the IAF Golden Jubilee.

In November 2014, it was awarded the President's Standard.

The squadron celebrated its golden jubilee in 2019 and remains the only squadron in Indian Air Force fleet to operate non upgraded Mig-21 bis. The squadron was planned to be number-plated in 2020.

The squadron was number plated on an unspecified date. Currently, only 4 MiG-21 Bison squadron remains in service.

== Awards ==
On 21 November 2014, the then President of India, Pranab Mukherjee, awarded the President's Standard to No. 115 Helicopter Unit, IAF and No. 26 Squadron at Tezpur, Assam.

=== Aircraft ===
Aircraft types operated by the squadron

Aircraft type	From	To	Air base
Sukhoi Su-7 BMK	February 1968	July 1977	Adampur AFS
MiG-21 bis	July 1977	N/A	Pathankot AFS
