= Keelor =

Keelor is a surname. Notable people with the surname include:

- Denzil Keelor (1933–2024), Indian Air Force marshal
- Greg Keelor (born 1954), Canadian singer-songwriter and musician
- Trevor Keelor (1934–2002), Indian Air Force officer, brother of Denzil
