= Kaushal Yadav =

Kaushal Yadav may refer to:

- Kaushal Yadav (soldier)
- Kaushal Yadav (politician)
