= Isewal =

- Village
- Location in Punjab, India Isewal (India)
- Coordinates: 30°53′54″N 75°41′48″E
- Country: India
- State: Punjab
- District: Ludhiana
- Tehsil: Ludhiana West

Government
  - Type: Panchayati raj (India)
  - Body: Gram panchayat

Languages
  - Official: Punjabi
  - Other spoken: Hindi
- Time zone: UTC+5:30 (IST)
- Telephone code: 0161
- ISO 3166 code: IN-PB
- Vehicle registration: PB-10
- Website: ludhiana.nic.in

Isewal is a village located in the Ludhiana West tehsil, of Ludhiana district, Punjab, Isewal is famous for being the birthplace of Fg Offr Nirmal Jit Singh Sekhon, PVC. The main surname of this village is Sekhon. It is one of the richest villages in the district.

== Administration ==
The village is administrated by a Sarpanch S. Harinder Singh Sekhon of village as per constitution of India and Panchayati raj (India) since 2020.

Particulars	Total	Male	Female
Total No. of Houses	399		
Population	2,080	1,098	982

== Air travel connectivity ==
The closest airport to the village is Sahnewal Airport.

== History ==
This village is famous as the birthplace of great Flying Officer Nirmal Jit Singh Sekhon, the recipient of Param Veer Chakra, India's highest military honour and medal.
