= No. 18 Squadron IAF =

No. 18 Squadron Flying Bullets
- Insignia of the No. 18 Squadron "Flying Bullets"
- Active: 15 April 1965 – 15 April 2016; 1 April 2020 – present
- Country: Republic of India
- Allegiance: Indian Armed Forces
- Branch: Indian Air Force
- Role: Air Defense; Ground attack
- Base: Naliya Air Force Station
- Nickname: Flying Bullets
- Mottos: तीव्र और निर्भया Swift and Fearless
- Decorations: PVC – Nirmal Jit Singh Sekhon (1971); Presidential Standard (2015)
- Battle honours: Indo-Pakistan War of 1971

Aircraft flown
- Fighter: HAL Tejas

No. 18 Squadron also known as The Flying Bullets Squadron nicknamed as The Flying Bullets is an air-defence unit of the Indian Air Force, flying from Naliya Air Force Station. The squadron is equipped with indigenous HAL Tejas MK1 in FOC configuration .

The squadron was resurrected on 1 April 2020, at Sulur, Tamil Nadu following which on 27 May 2020, the FOC variant of Tejas Mk 1 has been inducted into the squadron.

== History ==
The squadron was formed on 15 April 1965, with five Folland Gnats and eleven pilots, it operated out of Srinagar AFS. Although it existed during the Indo-Pakistan War of 1965, it did not officially participate in the conflict. A few pilots from this squadron flew operations with 9 Squadron, and 2 Squadron. Squadron Leader K.L. Khanna, was awarded the Vayu Sena Medal during the war.

The squadron first saw action during the Indo-Pakistan War of 1971, with the task of defending the Kashmir Valley. It operated out of AFS Srinagar, consisting of four aircraft, 17 officers and 72 men commanded by Wing Commander P Raina. On 4 December, it scrambled to intercept an approaching raid. The raid was never carried out, but the squadron kept flying Combat Air Patrols all day.

It fought its first dogfight, on 6 December, where Flight Lt. Bopaya and Squadron Leader Pathania got on the tail of four Sabres, despite heavy anti-aircraft fire. Bopaya realised that both he and Pathania were tailing the same Sabre, so he broke off and chased another, though he failed to damage any. Pathania managed to damage one of the Sabres, but his gun jammed and he failed to shoot down the plane. The Sabres managed to damage the Srinagar runway, and the pair of fighters were forced to land. On the same day Flight Lt. B.S. Ghuman, and Flying Officer R.V. Padkhe escorted Vampires into Hajira and destroyed a Brigade HQ. Flight Lt. Naliyan and Flying Officer V.K. Sharma flew their squadron's first mission into enemy territory, in the Poonch sector, escorting Vampires on their bombing raids successfully.

On 7 December, Bopaya and Flying Officer Nirmal Jit Singh Sekhon escorted another raid into the Poonch sector, and strafed enemy positions after the Vampires had delivered their weapons. On the 8th, Raina and Ghuman escorted another raid into Kargil, and strafed enemy bunkers after the bombs were delivered.

On 14 December, no patrols had taken place due to poor visibility. On seeing enemy Sabres in the sky, Ghuman and Sekhon were scrambled, without any Air Traffic Controller clearance. The Sabres successfully bombed the runway and turned back. Sekhon chased them and moved out of sight of Ghuman and the ground controllers. One Sabre was seen going out of control in the sky, but while Sekhon chased the second, a third Sabre shot him down. His parachute failed to deploy, and he was killed. He was posthumously awarded the Param Vir Chakra.

After the war, in February 1975, the Gnats were phased out, and replaced by HAL Ajeets. In May 1989, when the squadron was at Hindon, they were replaced with MiG 27s. Its former role of Air Defence was changed to Ground-attack.

The squadron received the Presidential Standard Award in 2015. The squadron was re-formed with the indigenous HAL Tejas on 27 May 2020.

No. 18 Squadron (Flying Bullets), is the only unit in the Indian Air Force to have been awarded the esteemed Param Vir Chakra, the highest gallantry medal awarded during times of war.

Initially, the squadron was based at Sulur Air Force Station and was later moved to Naliya Air Force Station in Gujarat at an unspecified date.

== Aircraft ==
Aircraft	From	To	Air Base
Folland Gnat	15 April 1965	February 1975	Srinagar AFS
HAL Ajeet	February 1975	May 1989	Hindon AFS
MiG-27 ML	May 1989	15 April 2016	Kalaikunda AFS
HAL Tejas Mk1	27 May 2020	—N/a	Sulur AFS
HAL Tejas Mk1	—N/a	Present	Naliya AFS

== Gallery ==
Squadron 18 ceremony pics
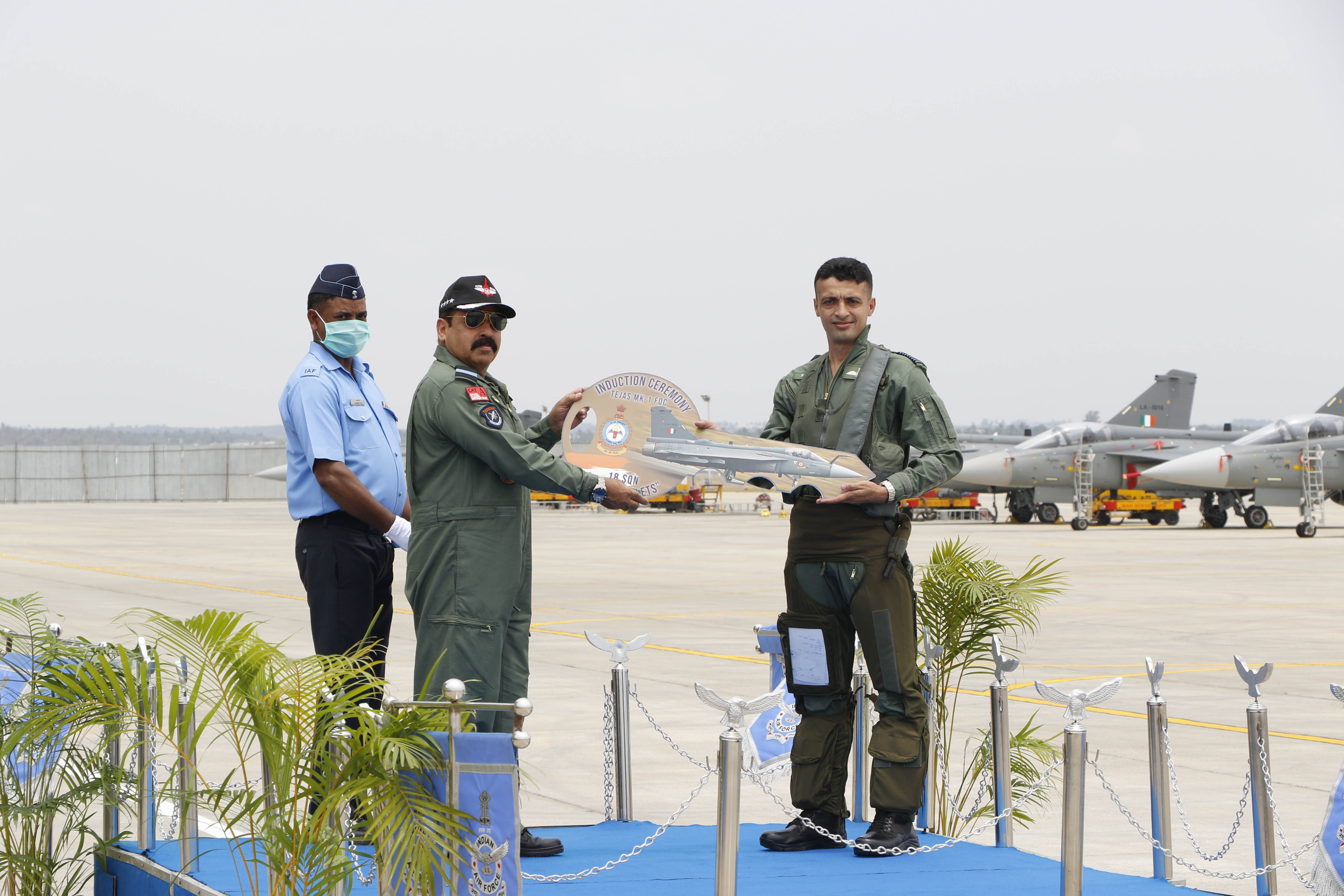
IAF Chief ACM RKS Bhaduria handing over ceremonial key to SQ 18 CO Manish Tolani.

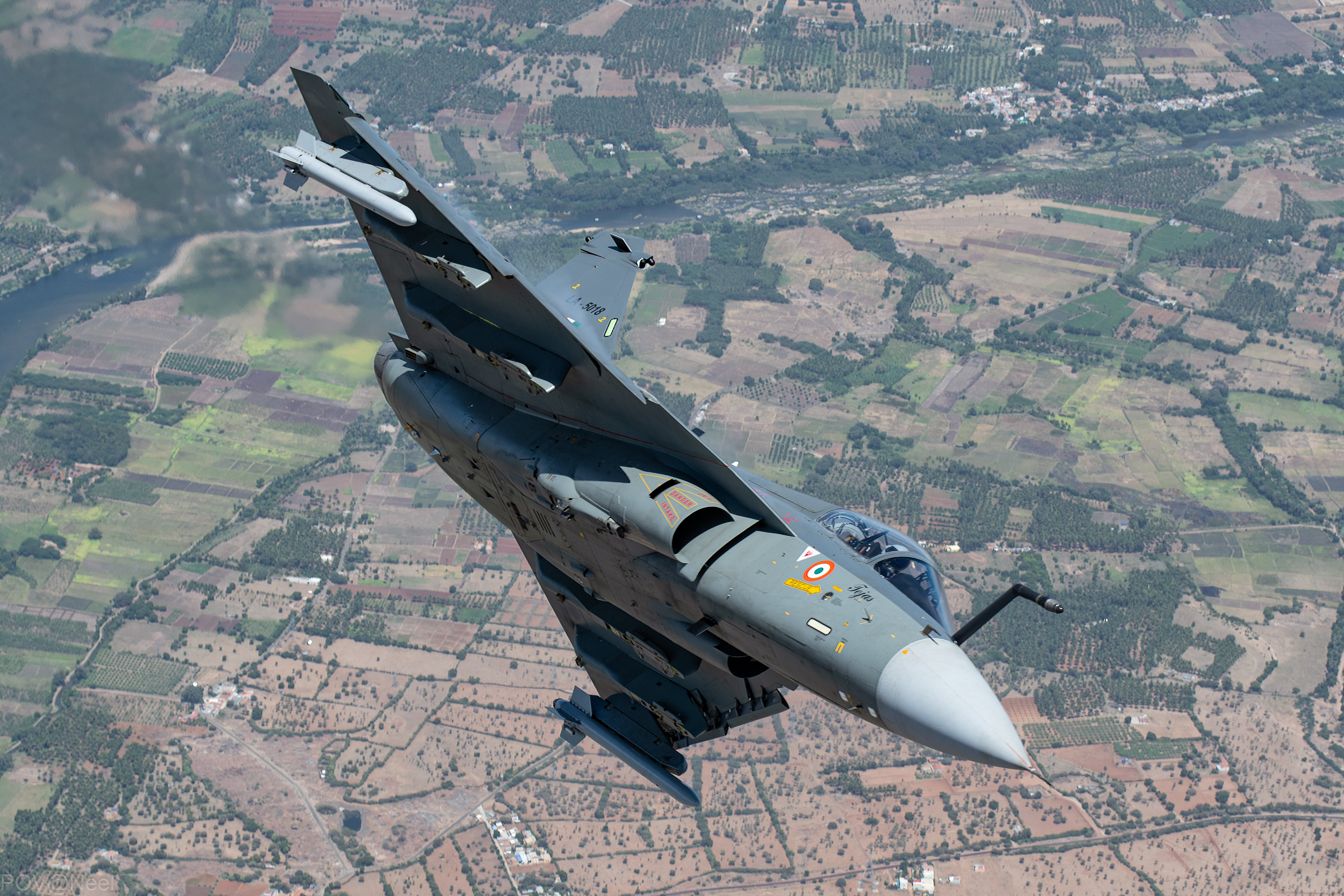
HAL Tejas (LA-5018) of Squadron 18 Flying Bullets doing air maneuver.

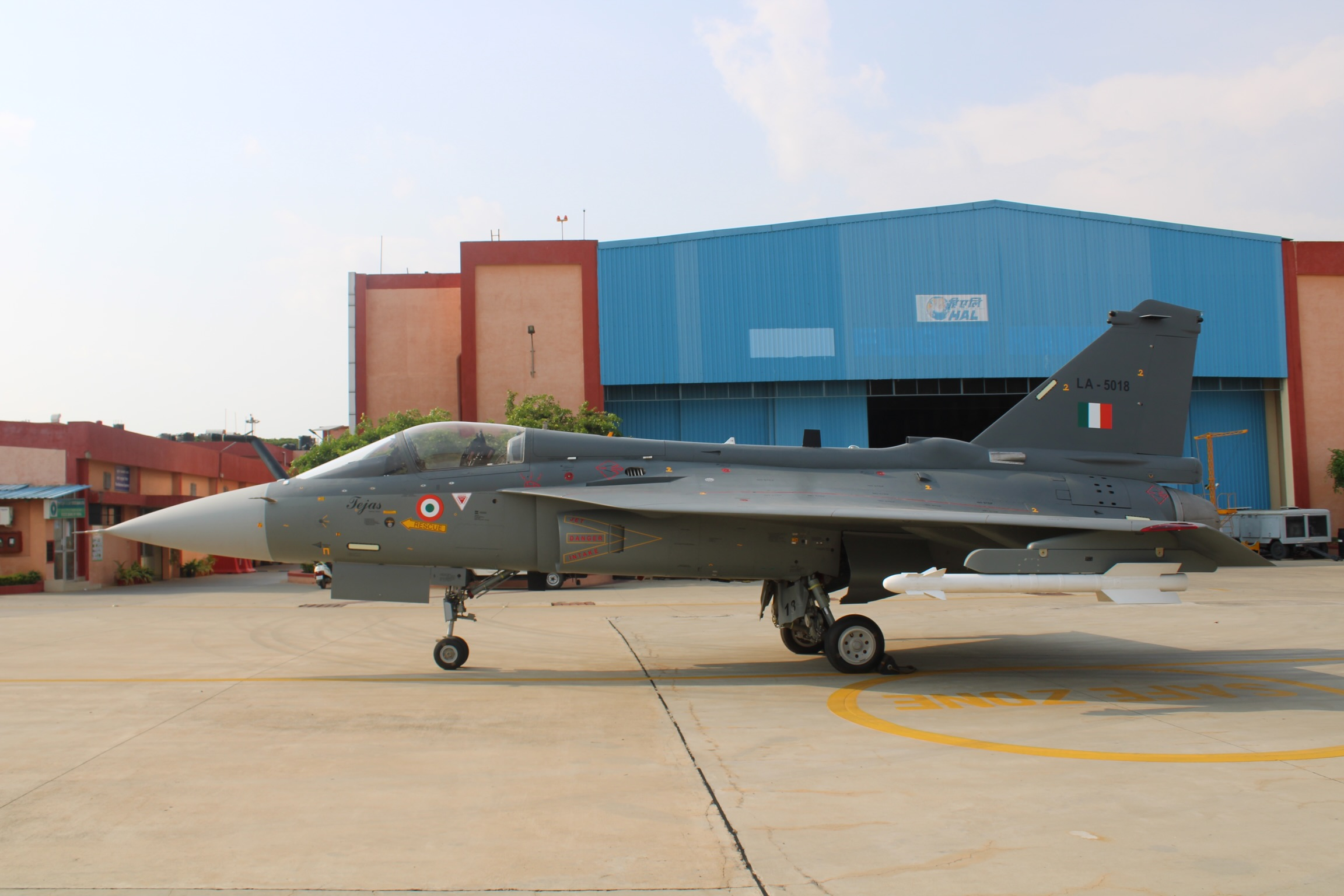
HAL Tejas SP-18 fresh off the production line.

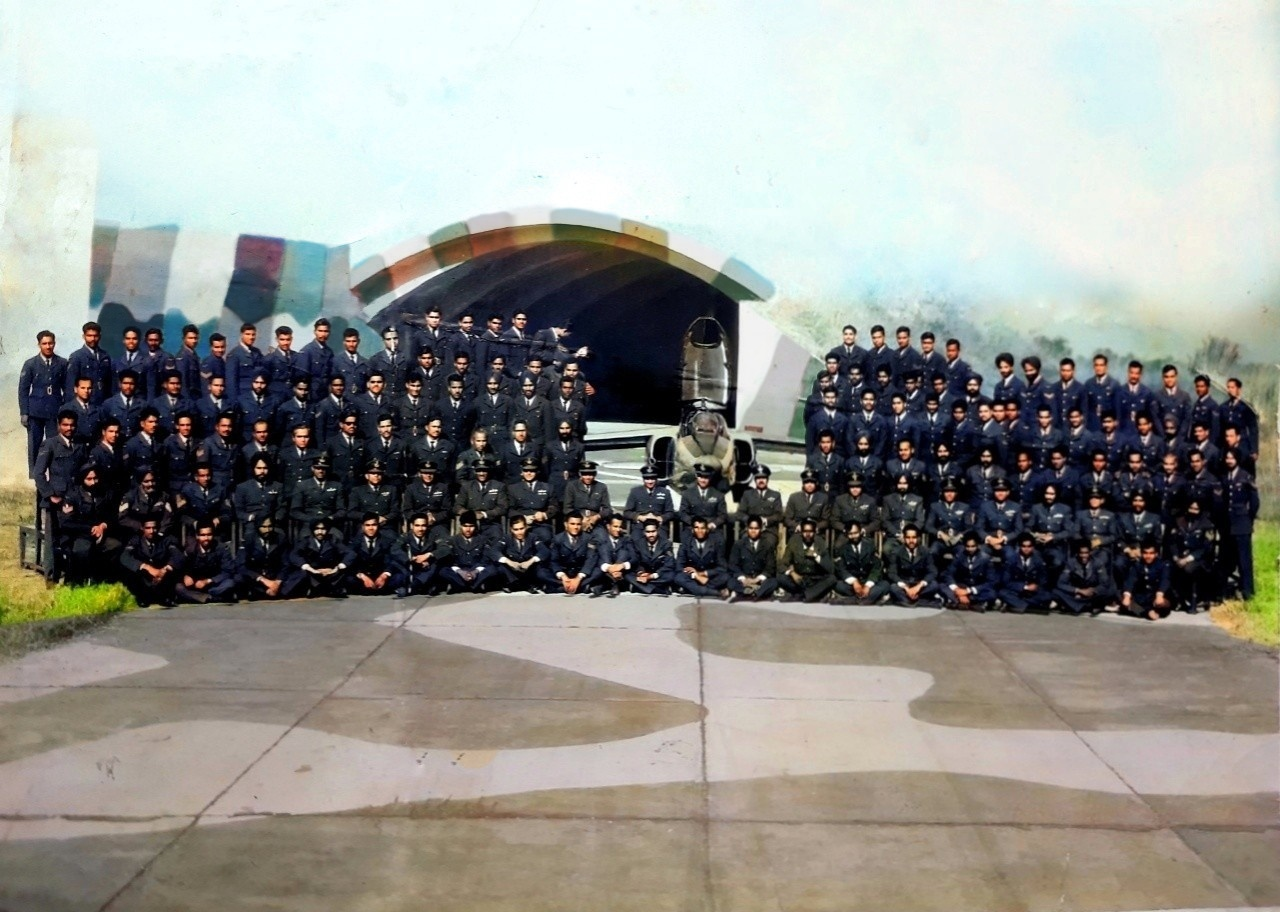
Men of the Squadron posing with one of their Folland Gnat fighter jets, a few months before the Indo-Pakistani War of 1971 broke out. Fg Offr Nirmal Jit Singh Sekhon, PVC is sitting in the 2nd row from the bottom, 4th from the right.

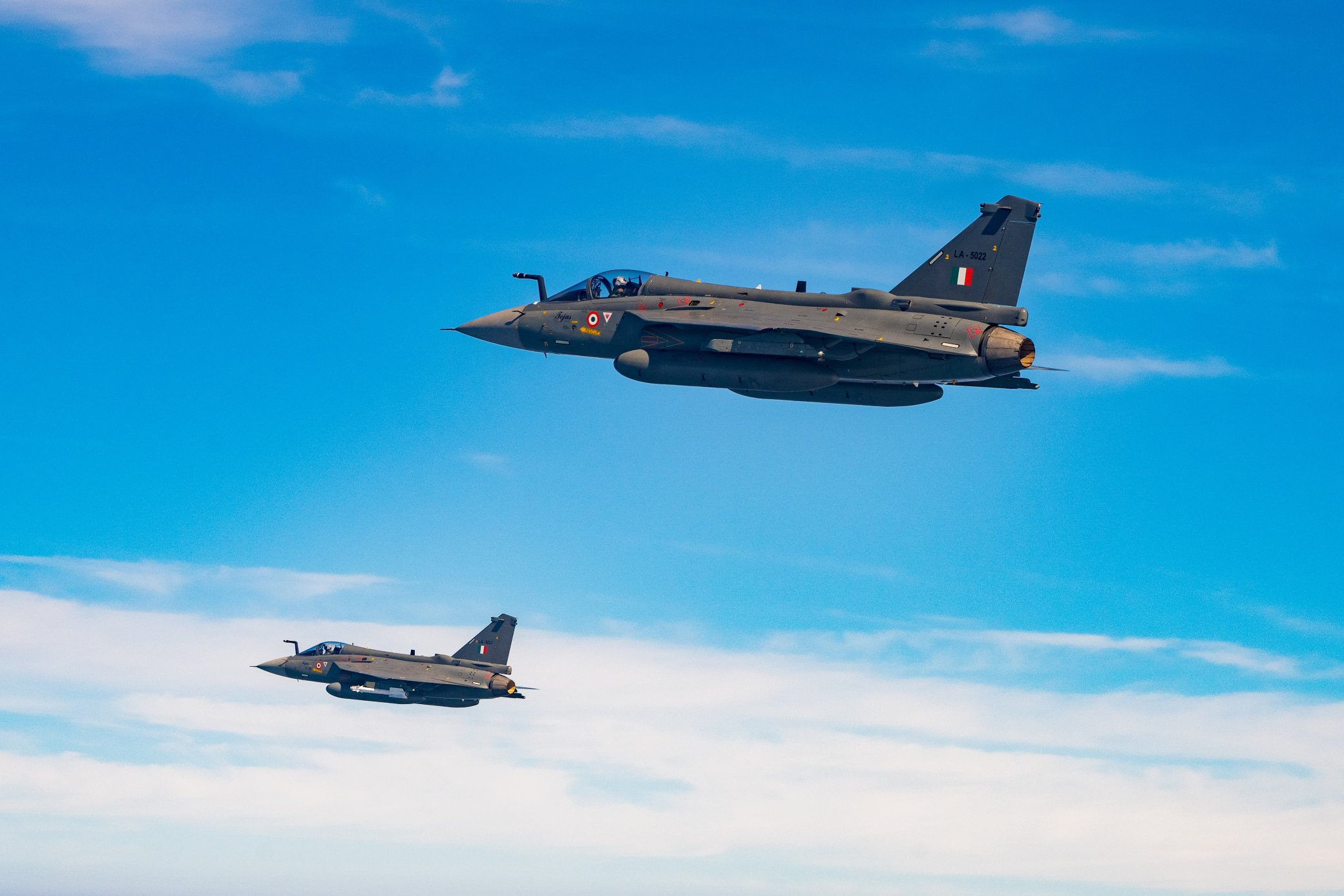
HAL Tejas from No. 18 Squadron on a routine sortie.
