= Krishan Kant Saini =

Wing Commander Krishan Kant Saini AVSM, VrC, VM
- Born: 26 October 1931
- Died: 14 October 2018 (aged 86); New Delhi, India
- Spouse(s): Late, Prem Bhalla
- Military career
- Allegiance: India
- Branch: Indian Air Force
- Service years: 1953–1973
- Rank: Wing Commander
- Unit: 104 Helicopter Squadron
- Commands: 104 Helicopter Squadron
- Conflicts: Sino-Indian War
- Awards: Ati Vishisht Seva Medal; Vir Chakra; Vayu Sena Medal

Wing Commander Krishan Kant Saini, AVSM, VrC, VM (26 October 1931 – 14 October 2018) was an Indian Air Force helicopter pilot of 104 Squadron who set the world record in helicopter avionics by accomplishing the world's highest altitude helicopter landing. He attained this feat on 8 May 1969 when he landed a Cheetah helicopter at the altitude of 6858 m (22,500 feet) in the Karkoram ranges.

Saini was also a distinguished officer of Indian Air Force, who was decorated for both gallantry and meritorious service. He won the prestigious Vir Chakra, the third highest award for gallantry in Indian Armed Forces, in 1962 Sino-Indian war when he carried out a dare-devil evacuation mission on his helicopter amidst hostile fire from many directions by the Chinese troops. Despite being hit by bullet and being temporarily blinded, he carried out his mission, winning himself a Vir Chakra in the process. Wing Commander Saini also subsequently received Vayusena Medal for Gallantry and Ati Vishist Seva Medal for meritorius service.

Later he was appointed Managing Director of Pawan Hans, where he brought to the attention of the Government issues with the quality of helicopters.

Saini died on 14 October 2018, at the age of 86.

== Gallantry award citation ==
Wing Commander Saini's gallantry award citation reads as follows:

"Flight Lieutenant Krishan Kant Saini had been operating in NEFA area since October, 1960. On 18th November, 1962, he, along with his co-pilot was evacuating seriously injured battle casualties in Walong area. He was instructed to land at a helipad close to the enemy line which was reported to be clear of enemy troops. When he was over the helipad, Chinese troops opened fire from many directions. His helicopter was hit at several places; the main reducter was damaged and oil from it gushed out in a thick spray which blinded him temporarily. His right ankle was also injured by a splinter and he was bleeding profusely. With great determination, presence of mind and skill, he dived the helicopter almost to ground level to avoid further damage from enemy fire. He thus saved the helicopter and the lives of his co-pilot and passengers. In spite of the damaged hydraulic system and the personal injury, he skilfully brought the aircraft back to base.

Flight Lieutenant Saini displayed courage, determination and professional skill of a high order."
