= Darryl Castelino =

Indian Air Force officer

Wing Commander Darryl Castelino KC
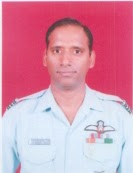
- Portrait of Wg Cdr Darryl Castelino
- Born: Darryl Castelino; 2 November 1975; Kalina, Santacruz, Mumbai
- Died: 25 June 2013 (aged 37); Gaurikund, Uttarakhand
- Burial place: Our Lady of Egypt Church, Kalina. 19.442°N 72.529°E
- Spouse: Jyothi Castelino
- Children: Ethan Castelino^{(Son)} Angelina Castelino^{(Daughter)}
- Military career
- Allegiance: India
- Branch: Indian Air Force
- Service years: 1998-2013
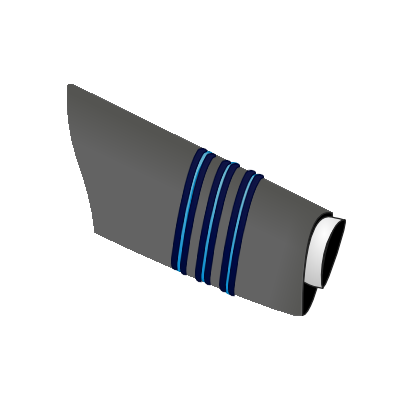
- Rank: Wing Commander
- Nickname: Castro Dayavan
- Service number: 25107 F(P)
- Operation Rahat
- Awards: Kirti Chakra (posthumous)

Wing Commander Darryl Castelino, KC (2 November 1975 – 25 June 2013) was an Indian Air Force Officer, detailed as the Captain of a Mi-17 V5 helicopter in the disaster relief operations being undertaken by the Indian Air Force in Uttarakhand. Castelino was a recipient of the Kirti Chakra, India's second in order of precedence of a peacetime gallantry award. As noted in his award commendation, Castelino was a "determined officer pressed on with a single-minded focus of saving precious lives" and "displayed acts of conspicuous courage, professional competence, and valor for undertaking the high risk of the mission to save precious lives in hostile weather conditions."
