= Lawrence Pereira =

Indian Air Force officer (1945–1971)

Flight Lieutenant Lawrence Pereira VrC
- Born: Lawrence Frederic Pereira; 10 June 1945; Bandra, Mumbai
- Died: 14 December 1971 (aged 26); Shakargarh, Pakistan (DOW)
- Burial place: RA (Royal Artillery) Cemetery, Garha Road, Jalandhar Cantt
- Spouse: Isabelle Pereira (AFMS)
- Children: Nicole Annabelle
- Military career
- Allegiance: India
- Branch: Indian Air Force
- Service years: 1964-1971
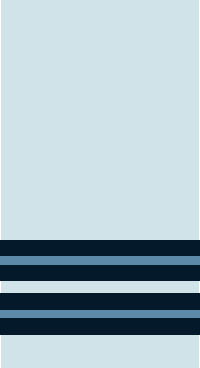
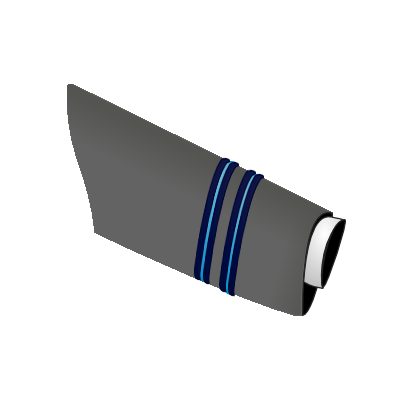
- Rank: Flight Lieutenant
- Nickname: Lawrie
- Service number: 8678 F(P)
- Unit: 8 TAC Center
- Conflicts: Indo-Pakistani War of 1965; Indo-Pakistani War of 1971; Operation Cactus-Lilly
- Awards: Vir Chakra

Flt Lt Lawrence Frederic Pereira (10 June 1945 – 14 December 1971) was an Indian air force officer. He was the recipient of the Vir Chakra, India's gallantry award presented for acts of bravery in the battlefield.

== Air Force career ==
Pereira began his training on 10 March 1963 at Air Force Administrative College in Coimbatore. He was commissioned on 10 August 1964, in the 80/90th Pilots course. Lawrie attended several training programs, courses and posting. The first posting to a fighter squadron after his commissioning was to No.220 Squadron at Pune. He actively participated in 1965 war with Pakistan. After this he was posted to a Gnat Fighter Unit. He was promoted to Flight Lieutenant in 1968 and trained on the Sukhoi-7 beginning in 1970. He was posted to Adampur Air Force Base and later to No. 26 Squadron IAF.

== Vir Chakra ==
The citation for the Vir Chakra awarded to him reads:

CITATION
(FLIGHT LIEUTENANT LAWRENCE FREDRIC PEREIRA)

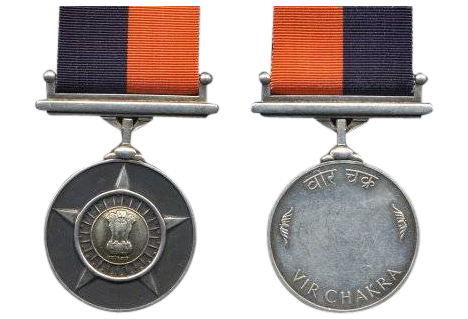

During the operations against Pakistan in December 1971, Flight Lieutenant Lawrence Fredric Pereira was employed on Forward Air Controller duties with an Army brigade in a forward area. He was required to direct close air support aircraft on to enemy targets from forward locations. His directions were responsible for many successful attacks by our aircraft on enemy concentrations. On the 14th December 1971, while performing his duties, he was hit by enemy bullets as a result of which he died.

Throughout, Flight Lieutenant Lawrence Fredric Pereira displayed gallantry, determination and devotion to duty of a high order.
