= Kaushal Yadav (soldier) =

Indian commando (1969-1999)

Naik Kaushal Yadav VrC
- कौशल यादव
- Born: 4 October 1969; Bhilai, then Madhya Pradesh Now Chhattisgarh, India
- Died: 25 July 1999 (aged 29); Zulu Top of Mushkoh Valley, Kargil, India
- Military career
- Allegiance: India
- Branch: Indian Army
- Service years: 1989–1999
- Rank: Naik; Squad Commander
- Service number: 13618411
- Units: 9 PARA (SF); Parachute Regiment
- Conflicts: Kargil War
- Awards: Vir Chakra

Naik Kaushal Yadav (4 October 1969 – 25 July 1999) was an Indian squad commander in 9 Para. He fought in 1999 Kargil War between India and Pakistan. He was awarded India's third highest gallantry award Vir Chakra posthumously. He was Squad Commander of 'BRAVO' team of 9 Para (Special Forces ) which was task to Capture Zulu Top.

== Early and personal life ==
Yadav was born in farmer family on 4 October 1969 at Bhilai of Madhya Pradesh now Chhattisgarh. He was born to father Ram Nath Yadav and mother Dhanwanta Devi. He was married to Nisha Devi, his son's name is Prateek Yadav

== Military service ==
Yadav joined the Indian Army in June 1989 at the age of 19 years and 7 months. He was recruited into the Parachute Regiment. Due to his excellent military skills and good performance, he was inducted into the 9 Para Special Forces.

== Operation Vijay ==
9 PARA (SF) was deployed in the Drass-Mashkoh Valley Sub-Sectors on 18 May 1999. From 19 June to 5 July 1999, the Battalion launched an operation to capture Sando Top and destroy a key enemy administrative base. Despite a challenging approach march and a cliff assault bringing them within 30 meters of the target, the enemy reinforced the position using helicopters. While the operation did not achieve complete success, the commandos displayed remarkable bravery, and eight soldiers made the ultimate sacrifice. Naik Yadav was the squad commander of the Bravo team of Para Special Forces. Yadav climbed up like a skilled mountaineer and made the way easier for his fellow soldiers. His squad reached Zulu top at 0500 am and was hit by an effective automatic firing from a peak of the northern part of the target. Nayak Yadav, while leading his squad, attacked the enemy's bunker from where the firing was coming. On reaching close to the bunker, he fearlessly attacked him, thrown grenades and opened fire from the hips.Nayak Yadav killed five enemy soldiers in a close fight. He continued to lead the attack even after being seriously injured in the deadly exchange of firing. Inspired by the fearlessness of Commando Yadav, his colleagues doubled their efforts and drove the Pakistanis from the top. Shortly after taking over the post, Naik Yadav died due to his injuries and sacrificed the highest sacrifice to protect the nation. Naik Yadav was posthumously honored with the Vir Chakra for his indomitable courage, his inspiring leadership and his unwavering loyalty to duty in front of the enemy.

== Shaheed Kaushal Yadav Award by Chhattisgarh Government ==
The state level Shaheed Kaushal Yadav Award for junior players was instituted in the memory of Shaheed Kaushal Yadav by Chhattisgarh Sports and Youth Welfare Department, Government of Chhattisgarh.
