= Vir Chakra =

Indian wartime military bravery award

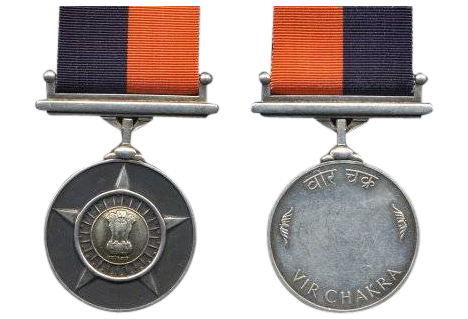
- Vir Chakra and its ribbon, the third highest military decoration of India
- Type: Military medal
- Awarded for: Acts of gallantry in the presence of the enemy, whether on land or at sea or in the air.
- Country: Republic of India
- Presented by: Republic of India
- Eligibility: Military Personnel Only
- Post-nominals: VrC
- Status: Currently Awarded
- First award: 1947
- Final award: 15th August, 2025

Highlights
- Total awarded posthumously: 362
- Total recipients: 1335 (As of 2023)

Precedence
- Next (higher): Ati Vishisht Seva Medal

- Equivalent: Shaurya Chakra (Note: Though the Shaurya Chakra is placed below the Vir Chakra in the precedence, it is considered as a peacetime equivalent of Vir Chakra.)

- Next (lower): Yudh Seva Medal

The Vir Chakra (pronunciation: ʋiːɾa tʃakɾa, lit. 'Wheel of Bravery') is an Indian wartime military bravery award presented for acts of gallantry on the battlefield, on land or in the air or at sea.

It is third in precedence in wartime gallantry awards and comes after the Param Vir Chakra and Maha Vir Chakra.

== Origin ==
It was established by the President of India on 26 January 1950 (with effect from 15 August 1947). The statutes were amended on 12 January 1952 to readjust the order of wearing as new decorations were established.

It replaced the British Distinguished Service Cross (DSC), Military Cross (MC) and Distinguished Flying Cross (DFC). Award of the decoration carries with it the right to use Vr.C. as a postnominal abbreviation [note the care to distinguish this abbreviation from that for the Victoria Cross (V.C.)

== Appearance ==
The medal is 1 3/8inch circular silver medal. A five pointed star, with the chakra in the centre, and, on this, the domed gilded state emblem. The decoration is named on the rim and suspended from a swiveling straight-bar suspender. The decoration is almost always named and dated on the edge. Around a plain centre, two legends are separated by lotus flowers; with Vir Chakra in Hindi above and in English below. The ribbon is 32 mm, half dark blue and half orange-saffron; dark blue 16 mm, saffron 16 mm.

The award carries with it a cash allowance and, in some cases, a lump sum cash award. This has been a rather controversial issue throughout the life of the decoration. From 1 February 1999, the central government set a monthly stipend of Rs. 850(Now enhanced to Rs. 7000/- pm from 2017) for recipients of the award. In addition, many states have established individual pension rewards for the recipients of the decoration.

== List of Vir Chakra recipients ==
A total of 1327 personnel received Vir Chakra. Some of the notable Vir Chakra awardees include:

Key
†	Indicates posthumous honour

Rank	Recipient	Service	Date	
Lieutenant	TGN Pai	Indian Army	1950	1947 Indo-Pakistan War
Jemadar	Kanikasami	Indian Army	1947	1947 Indo-Pakistan War
Major	HS Bains	Indian Army	1948	1948 Operation Polo
Brigadier	Harbaksh Singh	Indian Army	1 May 1948	1948 Operation Polo
Lieutenant Colonel	Girdhari Singh	Indian Army	26 February 1948	1947 Indo-Pakistan War
Subedar Major and Honorary Captain	Bhim Chand	Indian Army	23 August 1948 and 27 December 1948 (2)	1947 Indo-Pakistan War
Air Vice Marshal	Ranjan Dutt	Indian Air Force	26 Jan 1950	1947 Indo-Pakistan War
Major	Tirath Singh Oberoi	Indian Army	26 Jan 1950	1947 Indo-Pakistan War
Major General	Ashwani Kumar Diwan	Indian Army	18 Nov 1962	1962 Sino-Indian War
Wing Commander	Krishan Kant Saini	Indian Air Force	18 Nov 1962	1962 Operation Leg Horn
Signalman	DC Dhilan	Indian Army	1963	1963
Havildar	KG George	Indian Army	1965	1965 Indo-Pakistan War
Lieutenant General	Zorawar Chand Bakshi	Indian Army	05 Aug 1965	1965 Operation Ablaze
Wing Commander	Trevor Keelor	Indian Air Force	03 Sep 1965	1965 Operation Riddle
Flight Lieutenant	Virendera Singh Pathania	Indian Air Force	04 Sep 1965	1965 Operation Riddle
Air Commodore	Alfred Tyrone Cooke	Indian Air Force	07 Sep 1965	1965 Operation Riddle
Naib Subedar	Ganesh Datt	Indian Army	07 Sep 1965	1965 Indo-Pakistan War
Naib Risaldar	Mohammed Ayub Khan	Indian Army, 18 Cavalry	09 Sep 1965	1965 Indo-Pakistan War
Wing Commander	Amar Jit Singh Sandhu	Indian Air Force	17 Sep 1965	1965 Indo-Pakistan War
Lt Col	Russi Hormusji Bajina	Indian Army	18 Sep 1965	1965 Operation Riddle
Air Marshal	Denzil Keelor	Indian Air Force	19 Sep 1965	1965 Operation Riddle
Lieutenant General	Mohammad Ahmad Zaki	Indian Army	20 Sep 1965	1965 Operation Riddle
Admiral	Laxminarayan Ramdas	Indian Navy	01 Dec 1971	1971 Operation Cactus Lily
Brigadier	JK Tomar	Indian Army	03 Dec 1971	1971 Operation Cactus Lily
Lieutenant Colonel	Satish Nambiar	Indian Army	11 Dec 1971	1971 Indo-Pakistan War
Second Lieutenant	Kumud Kumar	Indian Army	13 Dec 1971	1971 Indo-Pakistan War
Brigadier	P V Sahadevan	Indian Army	16 Dec 1971	1971 Indo-Pakistan War
Captain	Prashant Kumar Ghosh	Indian Army	1971	1971 Indo-Pakistan War
Lieutenant Colonel	Vikram Deuskar	Indian Army	16 Dec 1971	1971 Indo-Pakistan War
Captain	Satish Chander Sehgal†	Indian Army, 75 Medium Regiment	16 Dec 1971	1971 Battle of Basantar
Air Commodore	Jasjit Singh	Indian Air Force	17 Dec 1971	1971 Indo-Pakistan War
Havildar	Gurdev Singh Hans	Indian Army	17 Dec 1971	1971 Indo-Pakistan War
Squadron Leader	Ramesh Chander Kohli	Indian Air Force	17 Dec 1971	1971 Indo-Pakistan War
Admiral	Arun Prakash	Indian Navy	21 Dec 1971	1971 Indo-Pakistan War
Wing Commander	Sukhdev Singh Dhillon	Indian Air Force	17 Dec 1971	1971 Indo-Pakistan War
Squadron Leader	M A Ganapathy	Indian Air force	1972	1971 Battle of Boyra
Lance Daffadar	Katar Singh	72 Armoured Regiment	1971	1971 Battle of Chhamb
Group Captain	Donald ‘Don’ Lazarus	Indian Air force	1972	1971 Battle of Boyra
Flight Lieutenant	Lawrence Frederic Pereira	Indian Air force	26 Jan 1972	1971 Indo-Pakistan War
Naik	Naib Singh Gill	Indian Army, 6 Sikh Regiment	26 Jan 1972	1971 Indo-Pakistan War
Subedar	Ratan Singh	Indian Army, Punjab Regiment	15 August 1972	1971 Battle of Longewala
Lieutenant General	J.B.S. Yadava	Indian Army, 11 Gorkha Rifles	15 August 1972	1971 Indo-Pakistan War
Lieutenant General	Francis Tiburtius Dias	Indian Army	15 August 1972	1971 Indo-Pakistan War
Flight Lieutenant	Gurdev Singh Rai	Indian Air Force	26 January 1974	1971 Indo-Pakistan War
Major	Ngangom Joy Dutta Singh	Indian Army	26 Jan 1988	1987 Operation Pawan
Major-General	Dalvir Singh	Indian Army	26 Jan 1988	1987 Jaffna University Helidrop
Lieutenant Commander	Deepak Agarwal	Indian Navy	26 Jan 1988	1987 Operation Pawan
Sepoy	Kamkholam Kuki	Indian Army, Assam Regiment	17 Dec 1989	1987 Operation Pawan
Flight Lieutenant	Abdul Naseer Hanfee	Indian Air Force, 128 Helicopter Unit	26 January 1989	1984 Operation Meghdoot
Naik	Kaushal Yadav †	Indian Army, 9 PARA (SF)	26 July 1999	1999 Operation Vijay
Captain	Jintu Gogoi	Indian Army, 18 Garhwal Rifles	15 Aug 1999	1999 Operation Vijay
Squadron Leader	Ajay Ahuja†	Indian Air Force	01 Jan 1999	1999 Operation Safed Sagar
Colonel	Magod Basappa Ravindranath	Indian Army, 2 Rajputana Rifles	28 Jun 1999	1999 Battle of Tololing
Lieutenant Colonel	Ramakrishnan Vishwanathan	Indian Army, 18 Grenadiers	Jun 1999	1999 Battle of Tololing
L/Havildar	Ram Kumar	Indian Army, 18 Grenadiers	Jun 1999	1999 Battle of Tololing
Major	Mariappan Saravanan	Indian Army, 1st Bihar Regiment	15 Aug 1999	1999 Operation Vijay
Colonel	Lalit Rai	Indian Army, 1/11 GR	15 Aug 1999	1999 Operation Vijay
Lieutenant Colonel	Yogesh Kumar Joshi	Indian Army, 13 JAK RIF	15 Aug 1999	1999 Operation Vijay
Captain	Sanjeev Singh Jamwal	Indian Army, 13 JAK RIF	15 Aug 1999	1999 Operation Vijay
Gunner	Sanjeev Gopala Pillai	Indian Army, 4 Medium Regiment	15 Aug 1999	1999 Operation Vijay
Captain	Vijyant Thapar	Indian Army, 2 Rajputana Rifles	16 Dec 1999	1999 Operation Vijay
L/Havildar	Chuni Lal	Indian Army, 8 JAK LI	30 Aug 2000	1999 Operation Vijay
Wing Commander	Abhinandan Varthaman	Indian Air Force	15 Aug 2019	2019 India-Pakistan Standoff
Naib Subedar	Nuduram Soren	Indian Army, 16th Bihar Regiment	26 Jan 2021	2020 Operation Snow Leopard
Naik	Deepak Singh	Indian Army, 16th Bihar Regiment	26 Jan 2021	2020 Operation Snow Leopard
Sepoy	Gurtej Singh	Indian Army, 3rd Punjab Regiment	26 Jan 2021	2020 Operation Snow Leopard
Havildar	Mangal Singh sisodiya	Indian Army	4 April 1971	1971 Indo-Pakistan War
Colonel	Koshank Lamba	Indian Army, 302 Medium Regiment	15 August 2025	2025 Operation Sindoor
Lieutenant Colonel	Sushil Bisht	Indian Army, 1988 (Independent) Medium Battery	15 August 2025	2025 Operation Sindoor
Naib Subedar	Satish Kumar	Indian Army, 4th Dogra Regiment	15 August 2025	2025 Operation Sindoor
Rifleman	Sunil Kumar	Indian Army, 4th Jammu and Kashmir Light Infantry	15 August 2025	2025 Operation Sindoor
Group Captain	Ranjeet Singh Sidhu	Indian Air Force	15 August 2025	2025 Operation Sindoor
Group Captain	Manish Arora	Indian Air Force	15 August 2025	2025 Operation Sindoor
Group Captain	Animesh Patni	Indian Air Force	15 August 2025	2025 Operation Sindoor
Group Captain	Kunal Kalra	Indian Air Force	15 August 2025	2025 Operation Sindoor
Wing Commander	Joy Chandra	Indian Air Force	15 August 2025	2025 Operation Sindoor
Squadron Leader	Sarthak Kumar	Indian Air Force	15 August 2025	2025 Operation Sindoor
Squadron Leader	Siddhant Singh	Indian Air Force	15 August 2025	2025 Operation Sindoor
Squadron Leader	Rizwan Malik	Indian Air Force	15 August 2025	2025 Operation Sindoor
Flight Lieutenant	Aarshveer Singh Thakur	Indian Air Force	15 August 2025	2025 Operation Sindoor
Sub Inspector (GD)	Mohd Imteyaj†	Border Security Force	15 August 2025	2025 Operation Sindoor
Constable (GD)	Deepak Chingakham†	Border Security Force	15 August 2025	2025 Operation Sindoor

== Allowances and Benefits provided ==
Monetary allowance of ₹ 7,000 per month (enhanced from ₹ 3500 per month in 2017) is sanctioned to recipients irrespective of rank and income. The allowance is admissible to the recipient and upon their death is carried forward to the lawfully married widow. Each and extra bar to the decoration will carry the same amount as admissible to the original award.

Exempt from deduction of Income Tax According to sub-clause (i) of clause (18) of Section 10 of the Income-Tax Act, 1961 (43 of 1961) of 07.02.2014 any Income by way of pension received by an individual who has been in the service of the Central Government or State Government and recipient of Chakra series medal is Exempt from deduction of Income Tax after satisfying himself about the veracity of the claim.

Free Train travel facility Indian Railways issues complementary Railway passes enabling the recipients and their companion to travel from any railway station to any railway station. As mentioned in 18/2014 E(W)2008/PS5-6/8 of 07.02.2014 they are entitled to life long free travel in 1st Ac/ Executive class for self and a companion over all Indian railway trains (except Kolkata metro) inclusive of Rajadhani, Shatabthi and Durunto trains.

Exempted from payment of Toll fee Ministry of Road Transport and Highways (MoRTH) vide National Highways Fee (Determination of Rates and Collection) Rules, 2008 has notified that chakra series gallantry medal recipients are exempted from payment of user fee even if recipient is traveling in personal vehicle, if such awardee produces ID card issued and authenticated by competent authority.

State specific grants such as Cash in lieu of land, land, or a one time lump sum grant or monthly annuity are announced as a reward by state governments to the recipients based on their domicile. These vary from ₹1 crore (in Andhra Pradesh) to ₹5 to ₹25 lakhs in smaller states.
