= Tezpur Airport =

Airport of Assam, India

- IATA: TEZ; ICAO: VETZ

Summary
- Airport type: Military/Public
- Owner: Airports Authority of India
- Operator: Indian Air Force
- Serves: Tezpur
- Location: Salonibari, Tezpur, Assam, India
- Elevation AMSL: 240 ft (73 m)
- Coordinates: 26°42′44″N 092°47′14″E
- Website: Tezpur Airport

Map
- Location of airport in Assam TEZ (India)

Runways
Direction	Length		Surface
Direction	ft	m	Surface
05/23	9,010	2,746	Asphalt

Statistics (April 2025 - March 2026)
- Passengers: 0 (▼ -100%)
- Aircraft movements: 0 (▼ -100%)
- Cargo tonnage: 0 (▼ -100%)
- Source: AAI

Tezpur Airport (IATA: TEZ, ICAO: VETZ), also known as Salonibari Air Force Station, is a domestic airport and an Indian Air Force Station serving Tezpur, Assam, India. It is located in Salonibari, situated 8.5 km (5.3 mi) from the city centre.

The airport covers an area of 22 acres, with the passenger terminal. The apron can accommodate one Airbus A320 and two ATR-72 aircraft.

== History ==
During World War II, the Royal Indian Air Force built the runway at Tezpur in 1942. It was used by the United States Army Air Forces Tenth Air Force as a B-24 Liberator heavy bomber base by the 7th Bombardment Group. After the war, it was converted into an air force base in 1959. The strategic location of the base has contributed to its importance. A variety of aircraft have operated from this location including de Havilland Vampire, Dassault Ouragan and MiG-21.

Indian Air Force's No. 2 Squadron "Winged Arrows" and No. 106 Squadron "Lynx" operate Sukhoi Su-30MKI from here.

== Airlines and destinations ==
Airlines	Destinations	Refs.
Alliance Air	Guwahati, Kolkata, Lilabari, Pasighat, Shillong	
