= Nirmal Jit Singh Sekhon =

Indian Air Force officer; Param Vir Chakra recipient

Flying Officer Nirmal Jit Singh Sekhon PVC
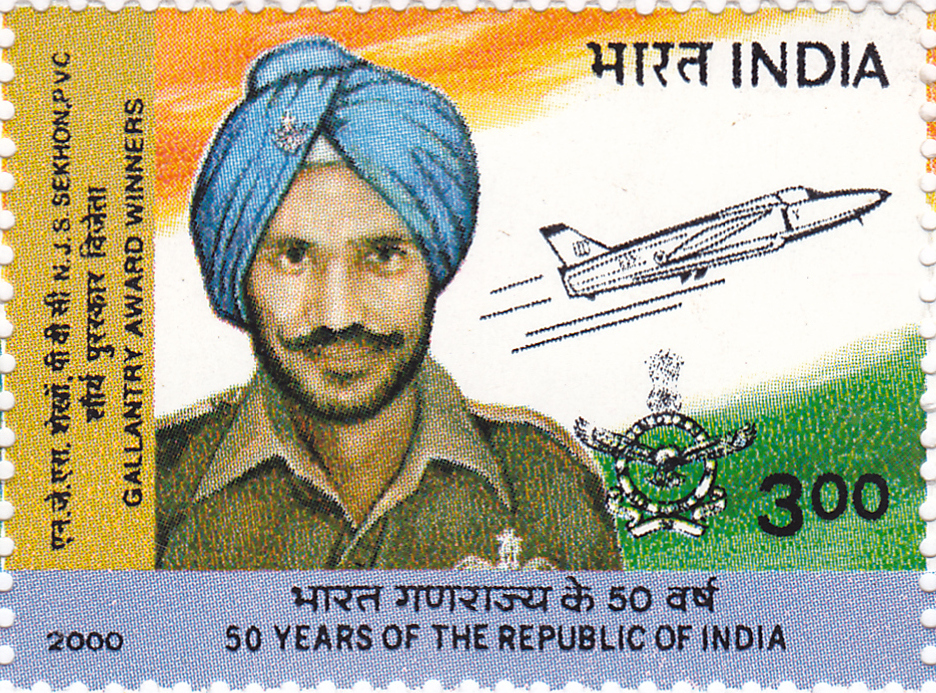
- Sekhon on a 2000 stamp of India
- Born: Nirmal Jit Singh Sekhon; 17 July 1945; Ludhiana, Punjab, British India (now in Punjab, India)
- Died: 14 December 1971 (aged 26); Srinagar, Jammu and Kashmir, India
- Other name: N.J.S. Sekhon
- Alma mater: National Defence Academy; Indian Air Force Academy
- Military career
- Allegiance: India
- Branch: Indian Air Force
- Service years: 1967–1971 †
- Rank: Flying Officer
- Nicknames: Nimmy; Brother
- Service number: 10877 F(P)
- Units: No. 18 Squadron (Flying Bullets)
- Conflicts: India–Pakistan war of 1971; Defence of Srinagar †
- Awards: Param Vir Chakra (posthumous)

Flying Officer Nirmal Jit Singh Sekhon, PVC (17 July 1945 – 14 December 1971) was an Indian Air Force officer. He was posthumously awarded the Param Vir Chakra, India's highest military honour, in recognition of his solo defence of Srinagar Air Base against a Pakistan Air Force (PAF) air raid during the India–Pakistan war of 1971. He is the only member of the Indian Air Force to be honoured with the PVC.

Flying Officer Sekhon's remains as well as the exact location of the crash site of his aircraft are still unknown.

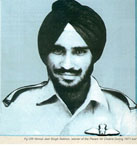
Fg Offr Nirmal Jit Singh Sekhon, PVC

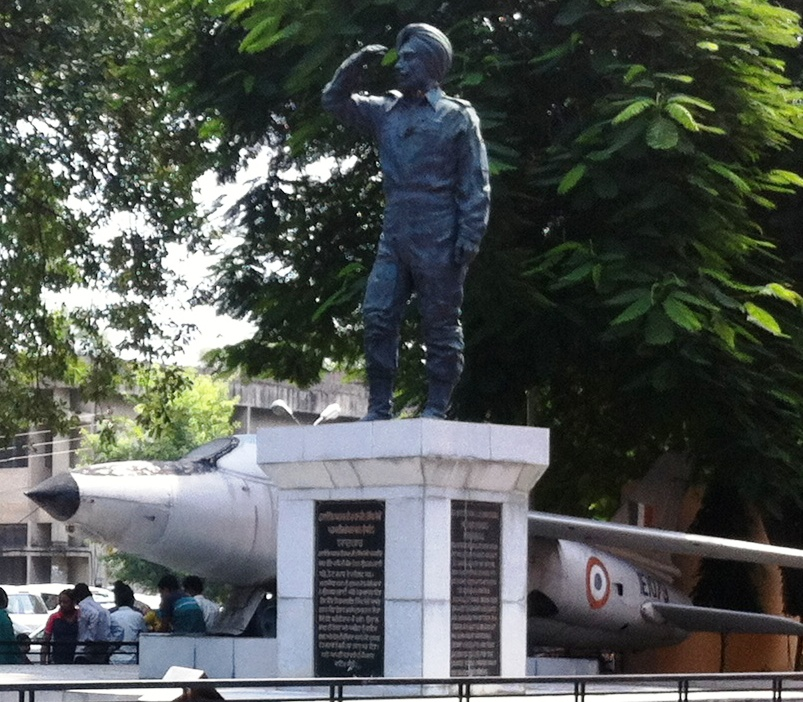
Statue of Nirmal Jit Singh Sekhon and his aircraft

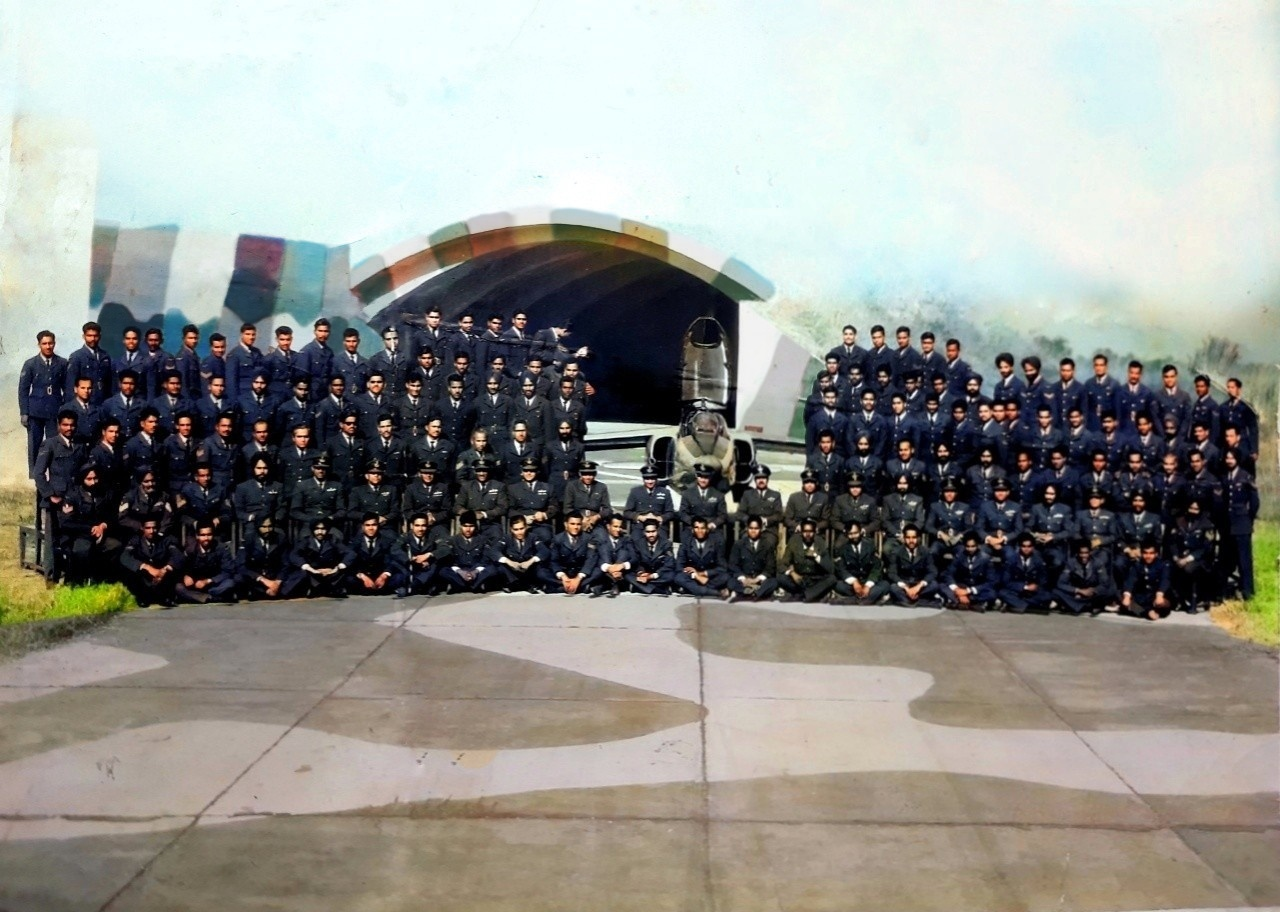
Nirmal Jit Singh Sekhon in a colorized photograph of the No. 18 Squadron just a few months before the India–Pakistan war of 1971. He is sitting in the 2nd row from the bottom, 4th from the right.

== Early life ==
Nirmal Jit Singh Sekhon was born to a Jat Sikh family on 17 July 1945 in the village of Isewal, Ludhiana, Punjab Province, British India. His father was Indian Air Force Master Warrant Officer and honorary Flight Lieutenant Tarlochan Singh Sekhon, and his mother was Harbans Kaur Sekhon. He was commissioned as a pilot officer in the Indian Air Force on 4 June 1967.

== Param Vir Chakra Award ==
During the India–Pakistan War of 1971, he was a member of No. 18 Squadron, the "Flying Bullets", flying the Folland Gnat fighter aircraft, based at Srinagar. On 14 December 1971, Srinagar airfield was attacked—as part of Operation Chengiz Khan—by six Pakistan Air Force F-86 jets of No. 26 Squadron from PAF Base Peshawar. Flying Officer Sekhon was on readiness duty at that time. As soon as the first aircraft attacked, Sekhon rolled for take-off as no. 2 in a two-Gnat formation, with Flight Lieutenant Ghumman in the lead, just as the first bombs were falling on the runway. Only delayed due to dust kicked up by the bomb. Sekhon lost no time in singling out the first Sabre pair, which was re-forming after the bombing run. Ghumman lost sight of his wingman just after take-off and remained out of the fight, leaving Sekhon to handle the enemy all by himself. In the ensuing air battle, Sekhon scored a direct hit on one Sabre and set another ablaze. The latter was seen heading away towards Rajauri, trailing smoke.

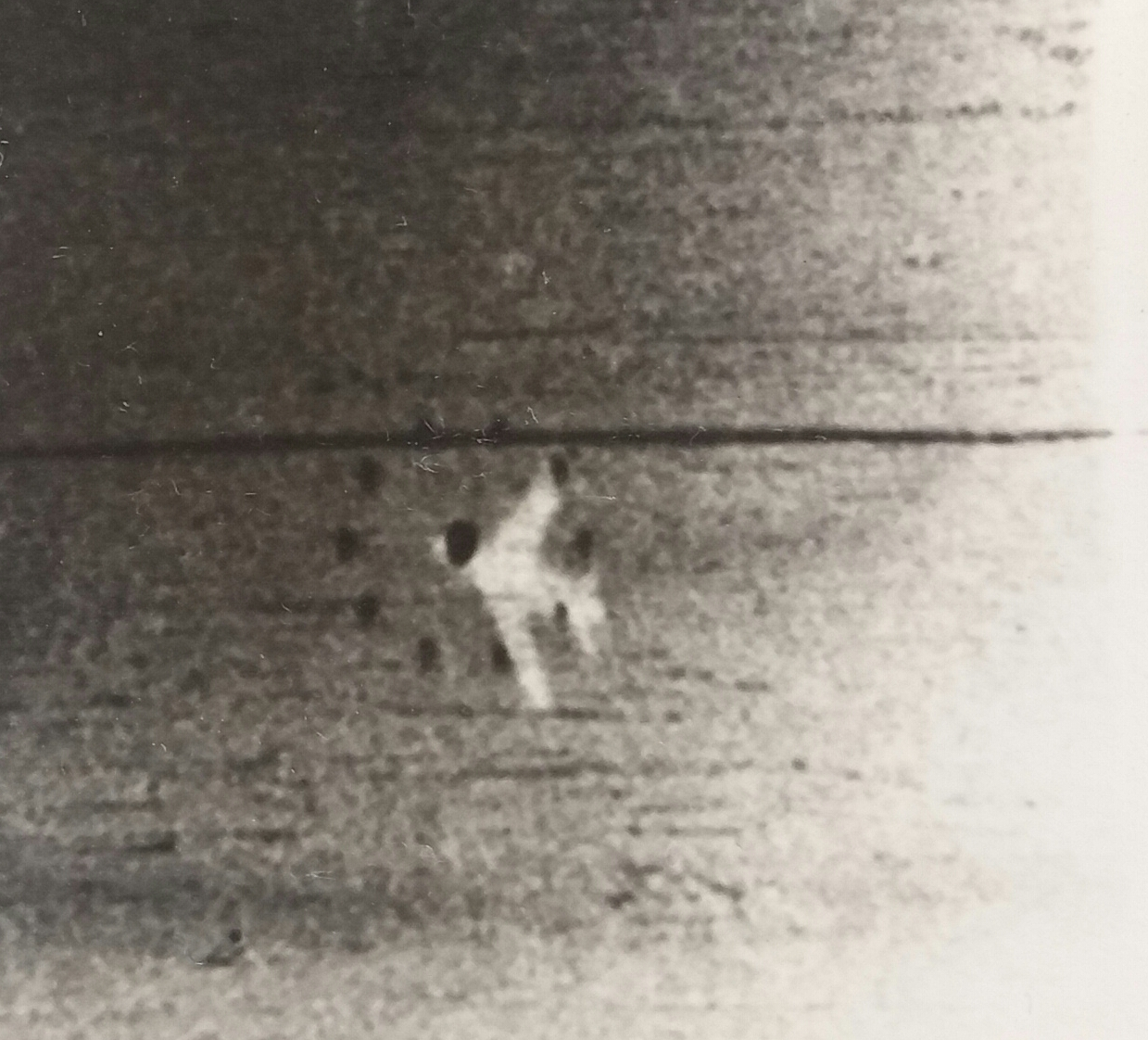
Salim Baig's F-86 gun camera footage of Sekhon's Folland Gnat

Sekhon, after being hit, was advised to return to the base by ATC Squadron Leader Virendera Singh Pathania. He is said to have flown in straight, wings level for some time, then going inverted and plummeting down, probably due to failure of control system. He attempted a last-minute ejection—as his canopy was seen to fly off—but it did not save him. The wreckage of the Gnat was found in a gorge near the road coming from Srinagar town to the base, a few miles from the base. Despite many efforts by Army and Air Force, his remains were never found due to the mountainous terrain where his fighter went down.

A detailed story of his efforts has been mentioned in an account by Air Commodore Kaiser Tufail. His skill was praised in an article by Salim Baig Mirza, the pilot who downed him. The bravery, flying skill and determination displayed by Flying Officer Sekhon, against odds of 6 to 1, earned him India's highest wartime medal for gallantry, the Param Vir Chakra.

== Citation ==
The Param Vir Chakra citation reads as follows:

CITATION

FG OFFR NIRMAL JIT SINGH SEKHON

18 SQUADRON 10877 F(P)

Flying Officer Nirmal Jit Singh Sekhon was a pilot of a Gnat detachment based at Srinagar for the air defence of the valley against Pakistani air attacks. From the very outbreak of the hostilities he and his colleagues fought successive waves of intruding Pakistani aircraft with valour and determination, maintaining the high reputation of the Gnat aircraft. On 14 December 1971, Srinagar airfield was attacked by a wave of enemy Sabre aircraft. Flying Officer Sekhon was on readiness duty at the time. Immediately, however, no fewer than six enemy aircraft were overhead, and they began bombing and strafing the airfield. In spite of the mortal danger of attempting to take off during the attack, Flying Officer Sekhon took off and immediately engaged a pair of the attacking Sabres. In the fight that ensued, he secured hits on one aircraft and damaged another. By this time the other Sabre aircraft came to the aid of their hard-pressed companions and Flying Officer Sekhon's Gnat was again outnumbered, this time by four to one.

Even though alone, Flying Officer Sekhon engaged the enemy in an unequal combat. In the fight that followed, at treetop height, he almost held his own, but was eventually overcome by the sheer weight of numbers. His aircraft was shot down by a gunfire of one of the Sabres and he was killed.

The sublime heroism, supreme gallantry, flying skill and determination above and beyond the call of duty displayed by Flying Officer Sekhon in the face of certain death have set new heights in Air Force traditions.

== Honours ==
- Statues of him have also been erected in many cities in India.
- A marine tanker built in 1985 was named Flying Officer Nirmal Jit Singh Sekhon, PVC.
- Indian Army converted the room once used by Sekhon, into a museum called PVC Abode at Badami Bagh in Srinagar. It was unveiled on what would have been his 80th birthday in July 2025, to preserve his legacy of bravery.

== Statues and a bust ==
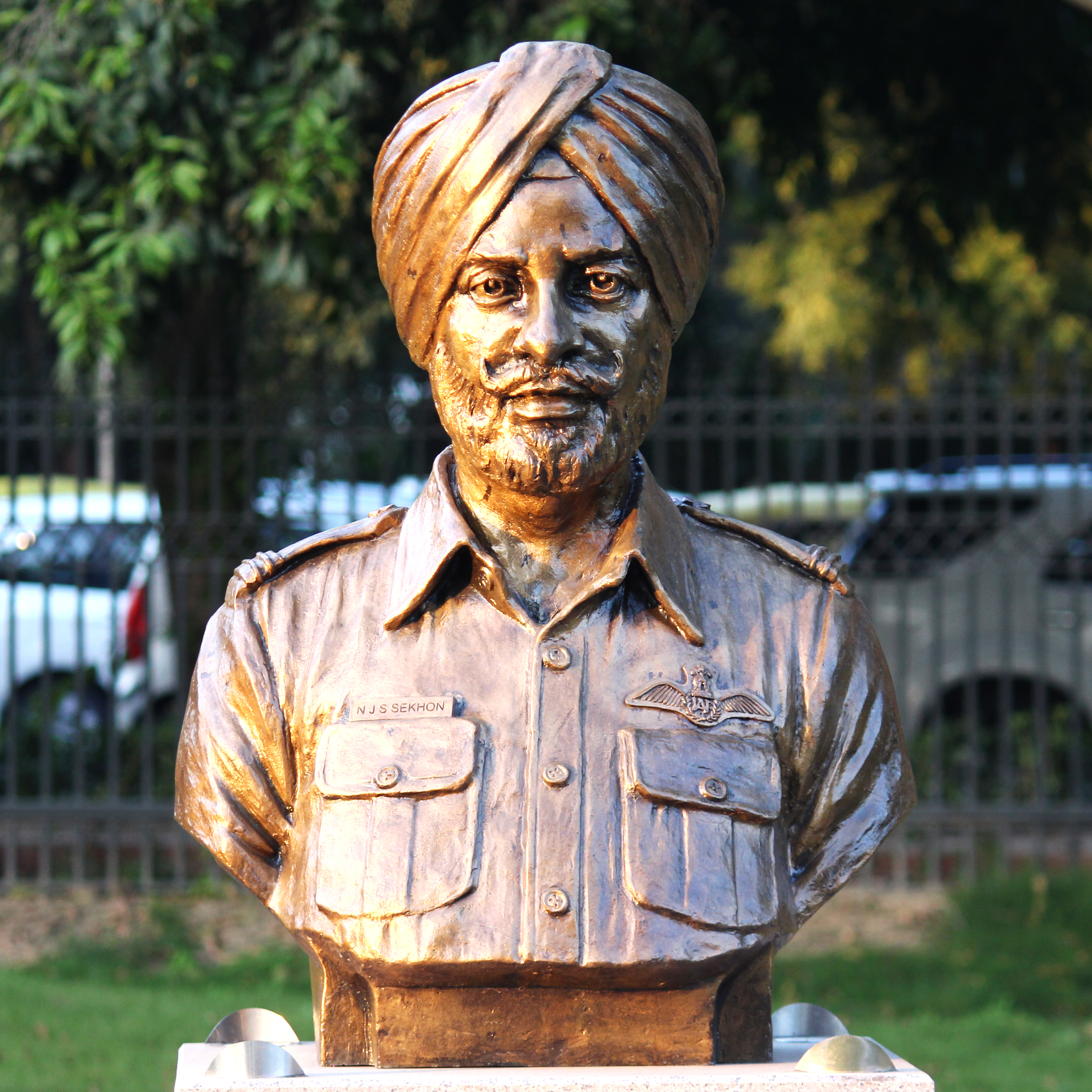
Sekhon's statue at Param Yodha Sthal, National War Memorial, New Delhi

A statue in tribute of Nirmal Jit Singh Sekhon was erected at the district court of Ludhiana (first erected at Samrala Chowk, Ludhiana) in the courtyard next to the flagpole. A decommissioned Folland Gnat fighter is part of the memorial and serves as a gate guardian.

His statue, along with a decommissioned Folland Gnat, has been placed in the Indian Air Force Museum, Palam.

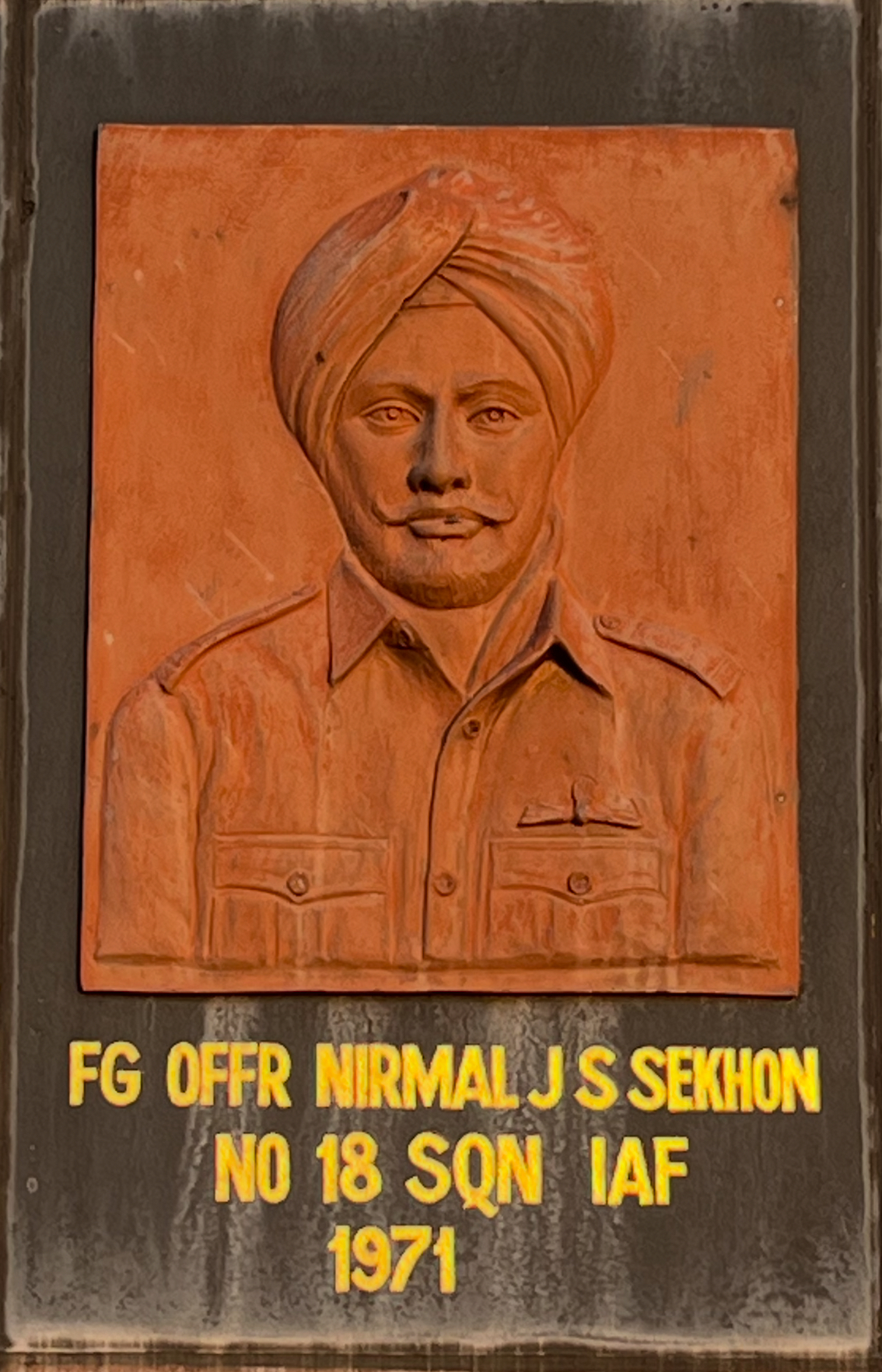
Relief Mural at Balidan Stambh Jammu

Balidan Stambh, the war memorial in Jammu, Jammu and Kashmir in 2009 paid tribute to him by inscribing his name on the pillars alongside the martyrs of the 1971 war. His name is displayed near the Amar Jawan Jyoti (Eternal Flame) and as relief mural on the outside background wall with the Param Vir Chakra awardees who were killed in Jammu and Kashmir.

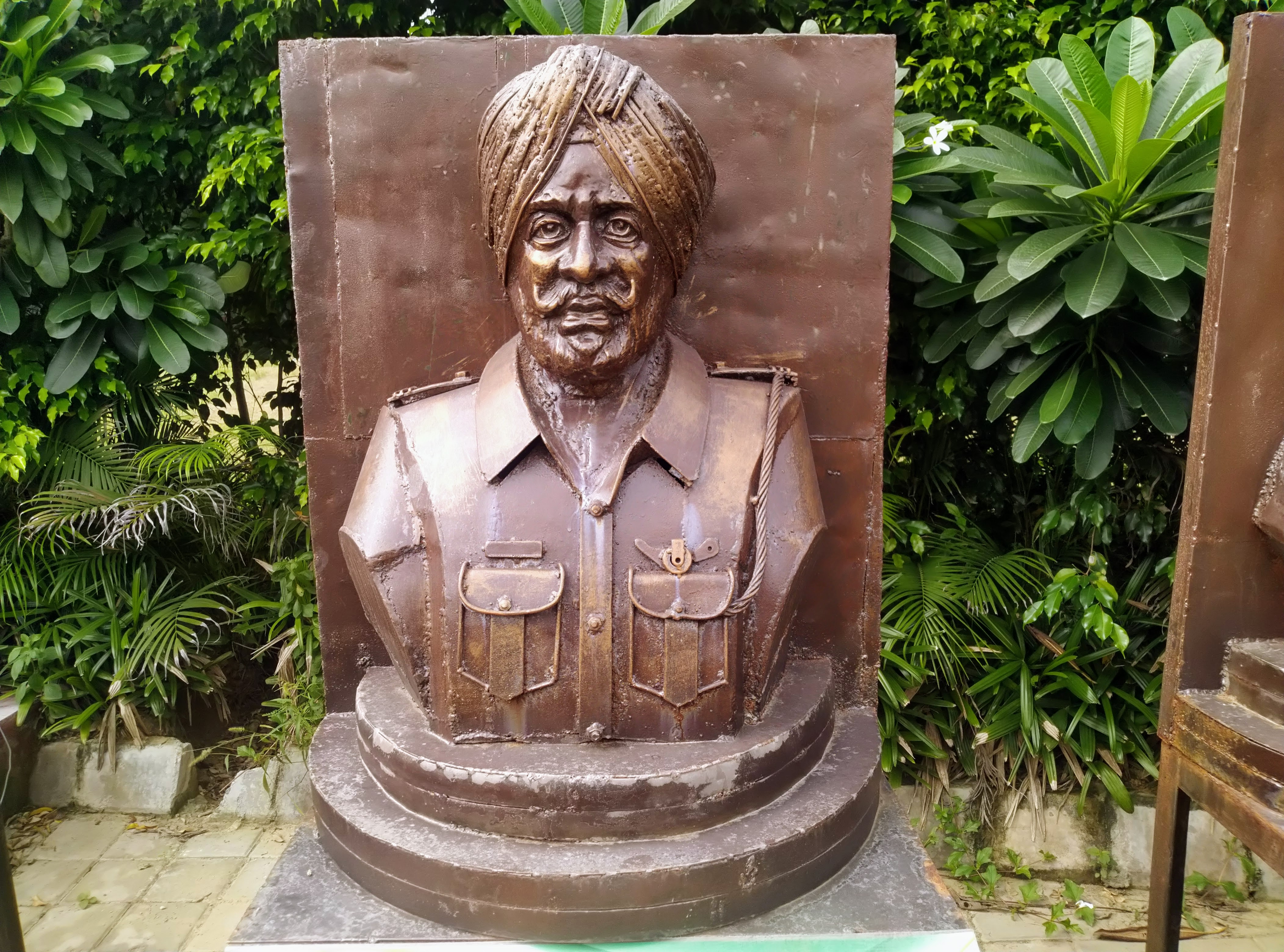
Sculpture of N.J.S. Sekhon at Shaheedi Park, New Delhi

Air Marshal BR Krishna unveiled Sekhon's bust in 2021 at Govt. Senior Sec. School, Issewal in Ludhiana, his birthplace.

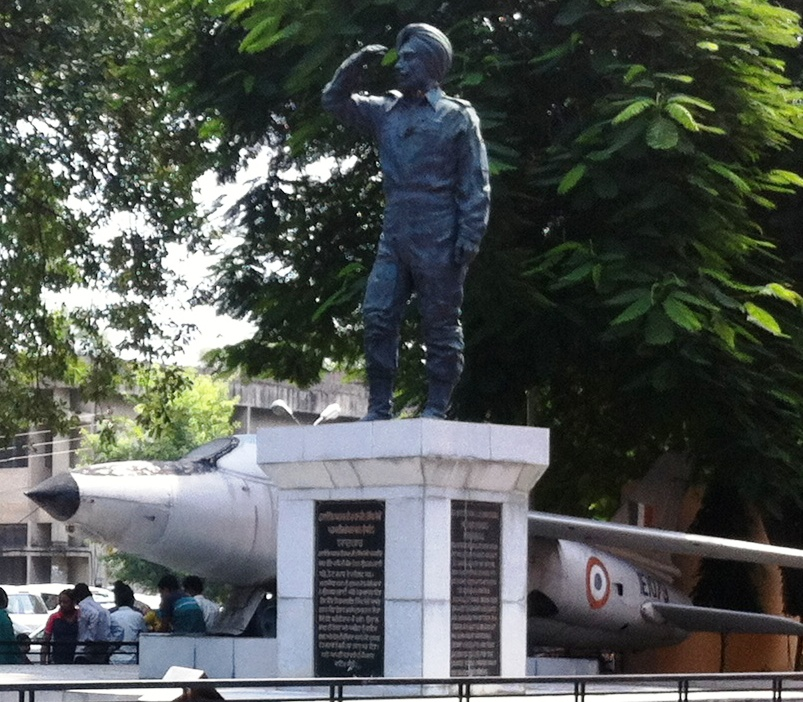
This memorial with his aircraft model is located at the District Court Complex Ludhiana.

== In popular culture ==
- The thirteenth episode of the TV series Param Vir Chakra, which aired on DD National in 1988, was about him. He was portrayed by Kanwaljit Singh.
- A graphic novel titled Param Vir Chakra by Amar Chitra Katha dedicated its thirteenth story written by Sanjana Kapur and drawn by Durgesh Velhal in 2015.
- A graphic novel titled Param Vir Chakra Nirmal Jit Singh Sekhon was written by Ian Cardozo and drawn by Rishi Kumar and was published by Roli Books in 2019.
- In the film Border 2, Diljit Dosanjh played the role of Nirmal Jit Singh Sekhon.
