= Manish Arora (officer) =

Indian Air Force officer, recipient Shaurya Chakra and Vir Chakra

Group Captain Manish Arora VrC SC
- Military career
- Allegiance: India
- Branch: Indian Air Force
- Service years: 18 June 2005 – present
- Rank: Group Captain
- Service number: 28462 F(P)
- Conflicts: 2025 India–Pakistan conflict
- Awards: Vir Chakra; Shaurya Chakra

Group Captain Manish Arora, VrC, SC is an officer of the Indian Air Force and a recipient of both the Vir Chakra and the Shaurya Chakra.

== Military career ==
Arora was commissioned into the Indian Air Force in 2005.

On 4 February 2010, as a flight lieutenant, Arora executed a recovery of a fighter aircraft after a canopy burst while at high altitude. Despite sustaining serious injuries, he retained control, recovered the aircraft and brought it safely back to base. For this act he was awarded the Shaurya Chakra.

In 2025, during the 2025 India–Pakistan conflict, Arora served as a mission leader for strike missions. As per the Indian claims, these penetrated contested airspace and reportedly struck high-value targets. For his leadership and gallantry during those missions he was among the IAF personnel awarded the Vir Chakra.
