= Jafarwal =

Coordinates: 31°05′N 75°18′E

- Village
- Location in Punjab, India Jafarwal (India)
- Country: India
- State: Punjab
- District: Jalandhar
- Tehsil: Shahkot

Government
  - Type: Panchayat raj
  - Body: Gram panchayat

Area
  - Total: 107.69 ha (266.1 acres)

Population (2011)
  - Total: 420; 218/202 ♂/♀
  - Scheduled Castes: 221; 116/105 ♂/♀
  - Total Households: 81

Languages
  - Official: Punjabi
- Time zone: UTC+5:30 (IST)
- ISO 3166 code: IN-PB
- Website: jalandhar.gov.in

Jafarwal is a village in Shahkot in Jalandhar district of Punjab State, India. It is located 3 kilometres (1.9 mi) from sub district headquarter and 45 kilometres (28 mi) from district headquarter. The village is administrated by Sarpanch an elected representative of the village.

== Demography ==
As of 2011, the village has a total number of 81 houses and a population of 420 of which 218 are males while 202 are females. According to the report published by Census India in 2011, out of the total population of the village 221 people are from Schedule Caste and the village does not have any Schedule Tribe population so far.

== See also ==
- List of villages in India
