= Alfred Tyrone Cooke =

Indian pilot (1939–2026)

Flight Lieutenant Alfred Tyrone Cooke VrC
- Born: 1939
- Died: 18 September 2026 (aged 86–87); New Delhi, India
- Military career
- Allegiance: India
- Branch: Indian Air Force
- Service years: 1961-1968
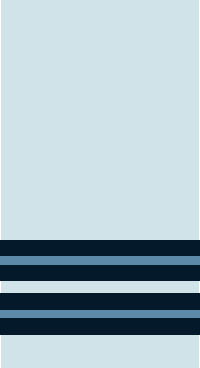
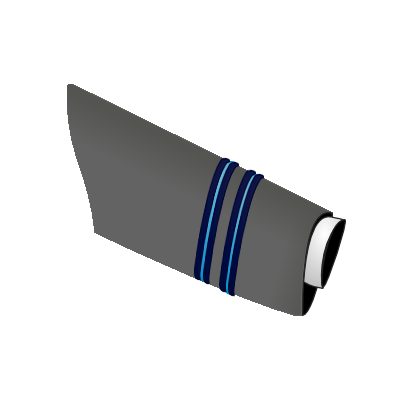
- Rank: Flight Lieutenant
- Service number: 6339 GD(P)
- Unit: No.14 Squadron
- Conflicts: Indo-Pakistani War of 1965
- Awards: Vir Chakra

Flight Lieutenant Alfred Tyrone Cooke VrC (1939 – 18 September 2026) was an Indian pilot who was decorated for his role in the Indo-Pakistani War of 1965. He was honoured with the Vir Chakra in September 1965. He received the award for shooting down a Sabre jet and severely damaging another, whilst flying a Hawker Hunter, whilst they were under anti-aircraft fire. It has been said that, "Flt Lt Alfred Tyrone Cooke is the only pilot in the Indian Air Force, who could claim to have engaged multiple enemy aircraft in the air and got the better of them."

== Background ==
Alfred Cooke was born in 1939. He attended La Martiniere Lucknow. Cooke left service as a flight lieutenant and settled down in Australia.

He was married and had two sons. Cooke died in New Delhi on 18 September 2026.

== Vir Chakra ==
The citation for the Vir Chakra awarded to him reads:

CITATION
(FLIGHT LIEUTENANT ALFRED TYRONE COOKE)

On the 7th September, 1965 when Kalaikunda airfield was under attack by 6 Pakistani Sabre Jet aircraft Flight Lieutenant Alfred Tyrone Cooke who was leading two of our aircraft on combat air patrol immediately led the aircraft into intercept them. Although our own anti-aircraft guns had already started to fire, he had engaged two of the enemy aircraft in complete disregard of his personal safety. The enemy aircraft tried evasive and counter-offensive manoeuvres; but with firm determination and exceptional skill Flight Lieutenant Cooke outmanoeuvred the enemy and pressed home his attack and shot down one of the enemy aircraft which disintegrated in mid air. Subsequently, he skillfully put his aircraft in a favourable position behind another enemy aircraft, but by then he had no ammunition left. However, he kept the enemy on the run and the remaining enemy aircraft fled in confusion. In this action Flight Lieutenant Alfred Tyrone Cooke displayed great courage, leadership and devotion to duty in the best traditions of the Indian Air Force.

== See also ==
- Aerial warfare in 1965 India Pakistan War
