= Amar Jit Singh Sandhu =

Indian Air Force fighter pilot (1933–1971)

Wing Commander Amar Jit Singh Sandhu VrC, VM
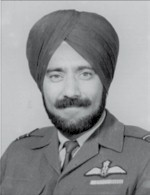
- Sandhu in 1965
- Born: 23 January 1933; Lyallpur, British India
- Died: 24 September 1971 (aged 38)
- Military career
- Allegiance: India
- Branch: Indian Air Force
- Service years: 1954 - 1971(Died in service)
- Rank: Wing Commander
- Nicknames: AJS Sandhu; Kala Sandhu; Ajax Sandhu; Black Leader
- Service number: 4705 F(P)
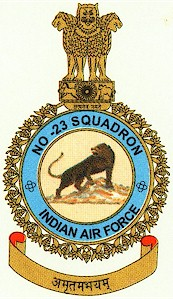
- Commands: No. 23 Squadron, Gnat Unit
- Conflicts: Indo-Pakistani War of 1965
- Awards: Vir Chakra; Vayu Sena Medal

Wing Commander Amar Jit Singh Sandhu VrC, VM (23 January 1933 – 24 September 1971) was an Indian fighter pilot and air force officer. He was awarded the Vir Chakra and Vayusena medals, and is credited for shooting down a Pakistan Air Force F-86 Sabre in the Indo-Pakistani War of 1965.

== Early life ==
Sandhu was born on 23 January 1933 in Layllpur, Punjab, British India. His family moved to Sirsa, Haryana (then Punjab), India after the Partition of India in 1947.

== Military career ==
Sandhu was commissioned in May 1954 in the Indian Air Force's Flying Branch as a fighter pilot. He was promoted to flying officer one year later.

=== Vayu Sena Medal ===
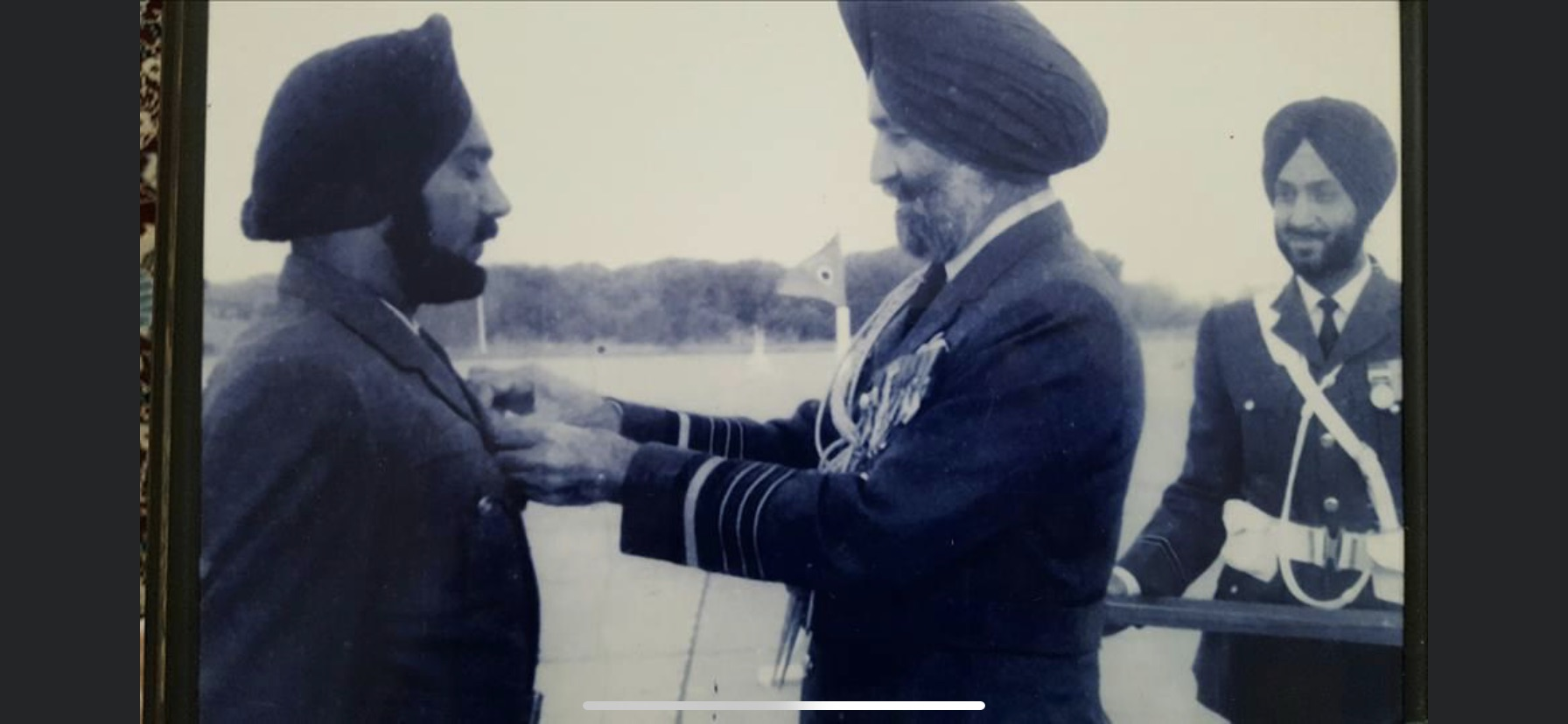
Squadron Learder Amar jit Singh Sandhu receiving the Vayu Sena medal from the head of the Indian Air Force, Air Chief Marshal Arjan Singh

In 1964, Sandhu was a flight lieutenant who was awarded the Vayu Sena Medal for carrying out a deadstick forced landing in March 1964 after his Gnat aircraft experienced an engine flame out, followed by a total electrical failure, which made it almost impossible to control the aircraft. He chose to land the plane rather than ejecting. This was the first successful deadstick landing of a Gnat.

The citation for the Vayu Sena Medal noted that by landing the plane, Sandhu not only saved the plane but also allowed the diagnosis of the cause of the flame out.

The Exact citation for the Vayu Sena Medal reads as follows

On 10th March 1964, Flt Lt Sandhu, while in formation of Gnat aircraft, experienced a flame out of engine followed by a total electrical failure rendering the tail plane inoperative. He was faced with the choice of either abandoning the aircraft and ejecting himself, or carrying out a 'deadstick' forced landing. In spite of the failure of vital services, he chose the latter in order to save a valuable aircraft from destruction. This was the first time that a 'dead-stick' landing was carried out in a Gnat aircraft. Flt Lt Sandhu also made it possible for the technical staff to ascertain the defect leading to the flame-out of the engine which, if undetected might have caused serious accidents in the future.

Flt Lt Amarjit Singh Sandhu displayed courage, high professional skill, and devotion to duty which are in the best traditions of the Indian Air Force"

=== Indo-Pakistani War of 1965 ===
Sandhu took active part in Indo-Pakistani War of 1965 from 1–22 September 1965 as part of No. 23 squadron.

He was part of the four aircraft formations sent out to ambush Pakistan Air Force aircraft on 3 September, where the first IAF aerial victory occurred, and took part in several aerial skirmishes.

Sandhu was flying the Folland Gnat at that time, which was one of the latest aircraft of the Indian Air Force. Despite this, the Gnat was not armed with missiles and only had two very powerful 30mm ADEN cannons. The Pakistan Air Force had F-86 Sabers and a squadron of F104 Starfighters. Both these PAF aircraft were armed with missiles.

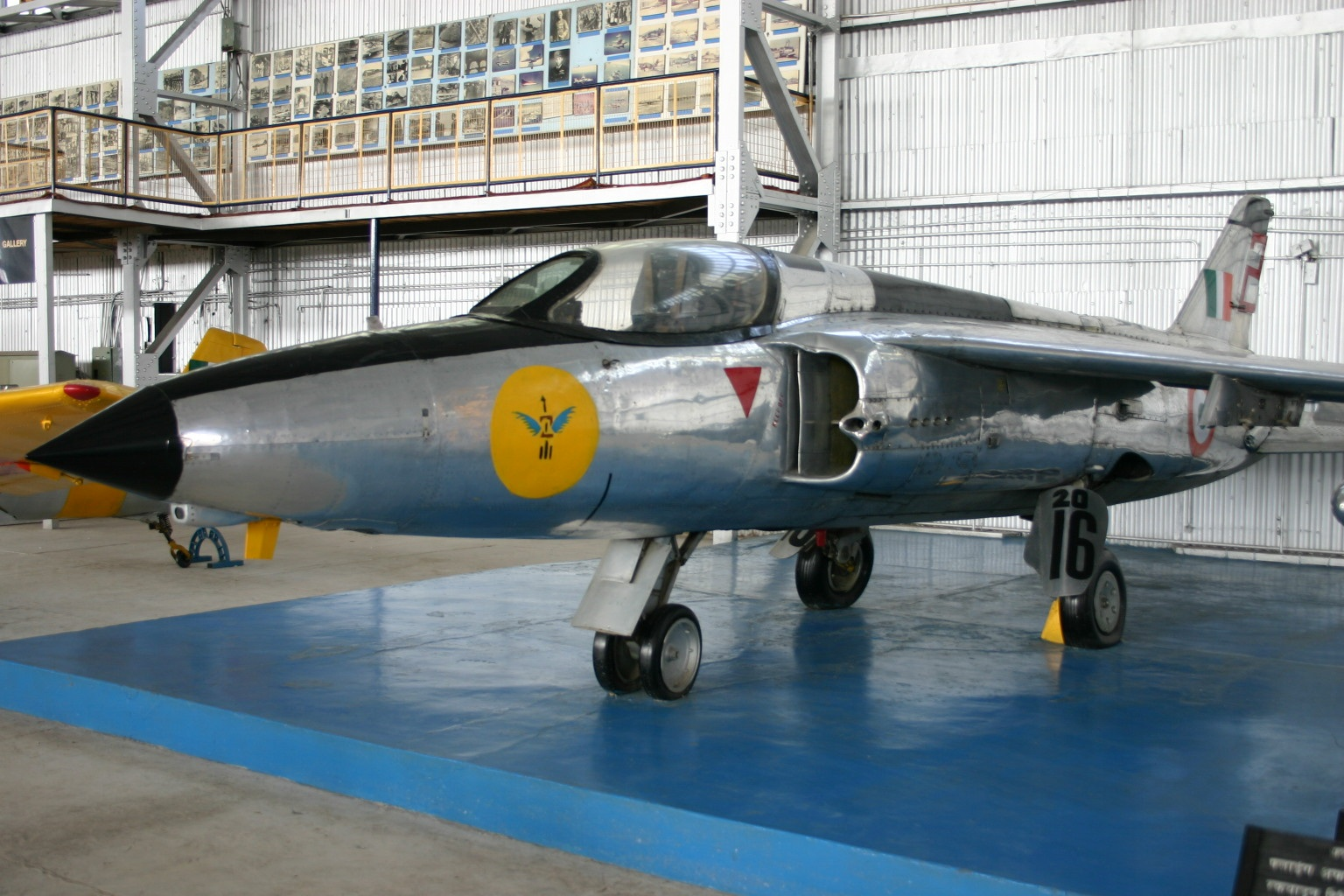
IAF Folland Gnat ("Sabre slayer")

On 18 September, Sandhu was able to outmaneuver and shoot down a Pakistani Sabre. As per the flight plan four Gnats took off and headed for the south of Lahore.

Sandhu and his formation were warned off approaching Sabres by Amritsar radar control. And moments later, six Sabres were noticed at a slightly higher altitude. Sandhu put his formation in a climbing turn to engage the Sabres. Sandhu went after the lead Sabre which was flying at an altitude of 20,000 feet. The Sabre too was being flown by an experienced pilot and both the Gnat and the Sabre engaged each other in a series of descending turns and climbs. Sandhu relentlessly stuck to the Sabre's tail through every maneuver. Finally at a mere altitude of 3000 feet, the Sabre pilot decided to do his vanishing trick. He half rolled the Sabre onto its back and pulled into a vertical dive.

Sandhu was in a fix. He knew that the Gnat would require a safety cushion of 4000 feet to pull out of such a maneuver, but here faced with the enemy escaping him, Sandhu followed suit. With incredible skill and endurance, he recovered from the near suicidal dive and gave the shock of his life to the Sabre pilot who pulled out at near ground level to still find the Gnat on his tail. Sandhu gave a well-aimed burst with his cannon, and the Sabre was shot down. Notching up the third kill to No.23 Sqn.

He was awarded the Vir Chakra award for this action.

=== Vir Chakra ===
The citation for the Vir Chakra reads as follows:

"Squadron Leader Amarjit Singh Sandhu was the Flight Commander of an Operational Squadron, which was assigned the task of establishing our air superiority over the Pathankot region during the recent operations against Pakistan. He flew repeated missions in the Chhamb sector and over the Pasrur and Lahore areas, all the time seeking out enemy aircraft and engaging them. On the 18th September 1965, in a thrilling encounter against enemy aircraft, he was able to outmanoeuvre the enemy with admirable skill, courage and judgment and shot down a Sabre jet.
The courage and devotion to duty displayed by Squadron Leader Amarjit Singh Sandhu were in the best traditions of the Indian Air Force."

The citation for the Vir Chakra Medal notes that he flew "repeated missions in the Chhamb sector and over the Pasrur and Lahore areas, all the time seeking out enemy aircraft and engaging them," and cites his "admirable skill, courage and judgment" in shooting down the Sabre jet.

In Victor Bingham’s book, Folland Gnat: Sabre-Slayer and Red Arrow, published in 2000, he credits Sandhu with two kills on 18 September:

The opposite combat view was that on interception the Gnat section led by Squadron Leader A Sandhu, carried out a half roll, built up speed and climbed out. Sandhu aimed for a deflection shot on the first Sabre and saw shots strike home; then seeing another Sabre he reversed to the left and within 270 degrees in the turn came in line with the enemy aircraft, a quick burst … and the Sabre burst into flames and exploded.

=== Command of a fighter squadron ===
Sandhu was promoted to wing commander and given command of No. 23 Squadron on 30 November 1970.

== Death ==
Sandhu was flying a Gnat out of the Pathankot airbase during the night of 24 September 1971; he was killed when his aircraft crashed. He was 38 when he died.

== Legacy ==
A chapter is dedicated to Sandhu in Wing Commander Dhiredra S Jafa's book, Death Wasn't Painful: Stories of Indian Fighter Pilots from the 1971 War, where he is referred to by the nickname "Kala Sandhu."

In official history of the Indian Air Force of the Indo-Pakistani War of 1965, he is mentioned as being the third pilot from No. 23 Squadron to have shot down a Sabre.
