= Trevor Keelor =

Indian Air Force officer (1934–2002)

Wing Commander Trevor Joseph Keelor VrC, VM
- Born: Trevor Keelor; 8 December 1934; Lucknow, British India
- Died: 27 April 2002 (aged 67)
- Burial place: War Memorial Christian cemetery.
- Spouse: Patricia Ann Keelor
- Children: Basil Keelor
- Relatives: Air Marshal Denzil Keelor
- Military career
- Allegiance: India
- Branch: Indian Air Force
- Service years: 1954-1978
- Rank: Wing Commander
- Nickname: Saber Killer
- Service number: 4818 F(P)
- Unit: No. 23 Squadron, Gnat Unit
- Commands: No.18 Squadron
- Conflicts: Indo-Pakistani War of 1965
- Awards: Vir Chakra; Vayu Sena Medal

Wing Commander Trevor Keelor, VrC, VM (8 December 1934 – 27 April 2002) was an officer of Indian Air Force who participated in the Indo-Pakistani War of 1965. He was honoured with a number of medals including the Vir Chakra and the Vayu Sena Medal. He had an elder brother, Denzil, who was also honoured for his service in the Indian Air Force. Both brothers have a Vir Chakra for the same feat of shooting down Pakistan Air Force F-86 Sabre fighters. It was the first time two brothers have received Vir Chakras for the same reason.

== Biography ==
Trevor Keelor was born on 8 December 1934 in Lucknow, India, and was educated at St. Francis' College and La Martinière College, Lucknow. Most of his schooling happened in St. Francis', where his father, Charles Keelor was the headmaster. He was a sibling to Gordon, Denzil (IAF pilot), Cynthia and Marie Viegas Jones. He joined the Indian Air Force in 1953 and rose to the rank of wing commander. He retired in 1978 and died on 27 April 2002.

== Awards ==
Keelor was awarded the Vayu Sena Medal in 1964. The citation reads as follows:

On the 5th February 1964, Flt Lt Keelor was detailed to ferry a Gnat from Poona to Palam in a formation of five aircraft. The last part of the flight had to be undertaken at a height of 41,000 feet [12,000 meters]. While descending to land at Palam, he discovered, at a height of 15,000 feet [4,600 meters] that there was no response from the engine to the throttle movements. After informing the leader, Flt Lt Kellor immediately broke off the formation and attempted a landing at Palam, knowing fully well that previous attempts to force[-]land a Gnat had resulted in fatal or serious injury to the pilot. With great presence of mind and careful handling, he accomplished the forced landing successfully without any damage to the aircraft. Flt Lt Trevor Kellor displayed courage, presence of mind and a high standard of professional skill in the best traditions of the Indian Air Force.

In 1965 Keelor was awarded the Vir Chakra. The citation reads as follows:

On 3rd September 1965, on receipt of a report that a formation of Pakistani fighters were circling over our Army position in the Chhamb Sector of J&K, a formation of Gnat aircraft was ordered to intercept the intruders. Approaching the area, Sq Ldr Trevor Keelor, who was a section leader in the Gnat formation, sighted enemy F-86 Sabre jets and engaged them in air battle. When the combat was in progress, F-104 Starfighters of the Pakistani Air Force also joined in. Unmindful of the numerical superiority of the enemy, Sq Ldr Keelor chased a Sabre jet and pressed home his attack until the enemy aircraft caught fire and disintegrated in the air. This was the first victory of our Air Force in the air battles against the Pakistani Air Force. In this operation, Sqn Ldr Keelor displayed courage and leadership of a high order in the best traditions of the Air Force.
