= No. 2 Squadron IAF =

No. 2 Squadron Winged Arrows
- Active: 1 April 1941–15 December 1947; 15 July 1951–2003; March 2009 - Present
- Country: Republic of India
- Allegiance: Indian Armed Forces
- Branch: Indian Air Force
- Type: Su-30MKI
- Role: Air superiority
- Garrison/HQ: Tezpur AFS
- Nickname: "Winged Arrows"
- Mottos: Amogh Lakshya; True To Aim

Insignia
- Identification symbol: Winged Arrow

Aircraft flown
- Fighter: Sukhoi Su-30MKI

No.2 Squadron also known as The Winged Arrows Squadron nicknamed as Winged Arrows is a unit dedicated to CAS in the Indian Air Force. No. 2 Squadron falls under the Eastern Air Command.

== History ==
Although No. 2 Squadron was formally established in 1941 at Peshawar, its roots stretch back to the mid-1930s when Indian pilots under the RAF began preliminary training deployments. Several historical sources cite administrative groundwork, aircraft allocation issues, and instructor shortages as reasons for the squadron's delayed operationalisation.

=== Assignments ===
- World War II
- Indo-Pakistani War of 1965
- Indo-Pakistani War of 1971

In 1947 during partition, No. 2 RIAF Squadron was allocated to India.

== Aircraft ==
Aircraft	From	To	Air Base
Pre-Independence (1941–47)
Westland Wapiti IIA	1 April 1941	December 1941	Kohat
Hawker Audax	July 1941	January 1942	Peshawar
Westland Lysander	December 1941	October 1942	South India
Hawker Hurricane Mk IIB	October 1941	December 1944	Ranchi
Hawker Hurricane Mk IIC	January 1945	March 1946	
Harvard IIB	October 1945	September 1947	Samungli
Spitfire VIII	February 1946	January 1947	Samungli
Post-Independence (1951–Present)
Spitfire VIII	August 1951	November 1953	AFS Palam
Harvard IIB	August 1951	November 1953	AFS Palam
Vampire FB52	November 1953	June 1956	AFS Palam
Dassault Ouragan	June 1956	May 1962	AFS Palam
Folland Gnat I	May 1962	March 1983	AFS Palam
HAL Ajeet	December 1983	April 1991	AFS Palam
MiG-27	July 1991	October 2003	
Su-30 MKI	July 2009	Present	AFS Tezpur
