= No. 23 Squadron IAF =

No. 23 Squadron
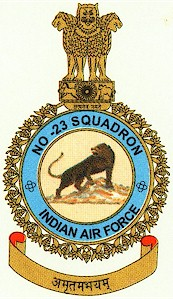
- Active: 1957 - 2025
- Country: Republic of India
- Branch: Indian Air Force
- Role: Fighter
- Garrison/HQ: AFS NAL
- Nickname: "Panthers"
- Mottos: Amritham Abhayam; Immortal and Fearless

Aircraft flown
- Fighter: MiG-21 Bison

No. 23 Squadron (Panthers) was a fighter squadron in the Indian Air Force and it was equipped with MiG-21Bison, based at AFS NAL. The Squadron was number-plated on 26 September 2025, following the decommissioning of MIG-21 Bison from active service.

== History ==
The squadron was raised in the year 1956 and it became the first squadron in Indian Air Force to be commissioned with Folland Gnat.

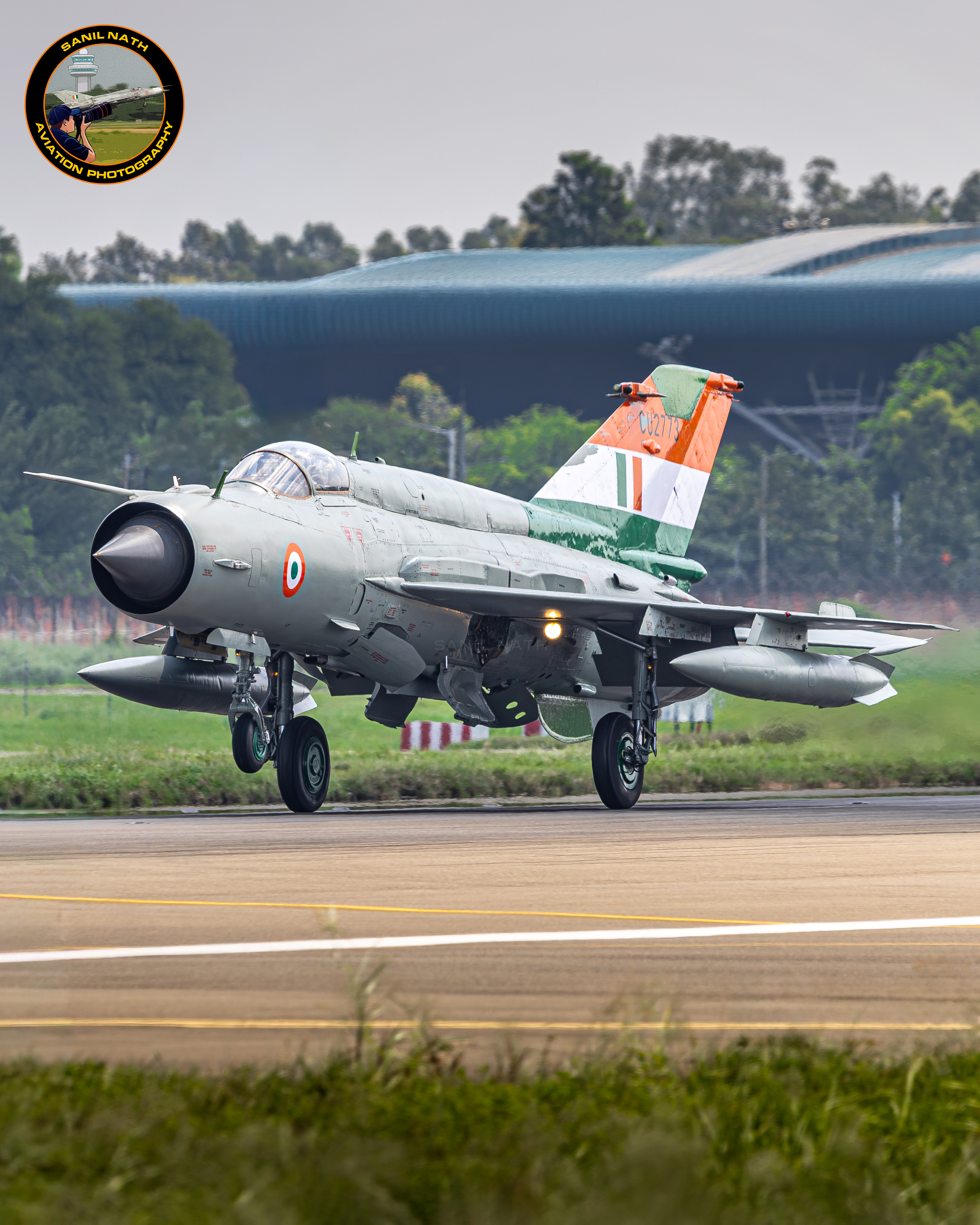
An Indian Air Force MiG-21 Bison of No. 23 Squadron (‘Panthers’) during landing; the unit was the last operational squadron to operate the MiG-21 in IAF service.

The squadron was relocated to AFS NAL in June 2024 and will be in use with its sister squadron No. 3 Squadron. The move was done to streamline the maintenance and operability of the MiG-21. Both the squadrons will transition to the newly ordered Tejas Mk1A.

The Indian Air Force officially decommissioned the MiG-21 Bison from active service in 2025. An official farewell ceremony was held at Chandigarh Air Force Station on 26 September 2025. The last of the aircraft are from this squadron.

=== Assignments ===
- Indo-Pakistani War of 1965
- Indo-Pakistani War of 1971
- Operation Sindoor

== Aircraft ==
Aircraft	From	To	Air Base
de Havilland Vampire	November 1956	January 1960	
Folland Gnat	February 1960	January 1978	
MiG-21 bis	February 1978	July 2005	
MiG-21 Bison	July 2005	June 2024	AFS Suratgarh
MiG-21 Bison	June 2024	26 September 2025	AFS NAL
