= List of aerial victories during the Indo-Pakistani war of 1971 =

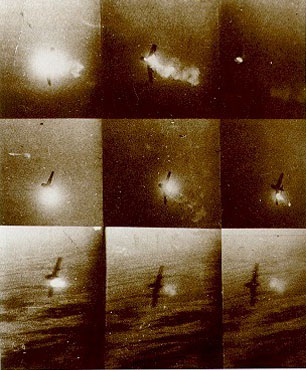
PAF Sabre being shot down in combat by an IAF Gnat in September 1965

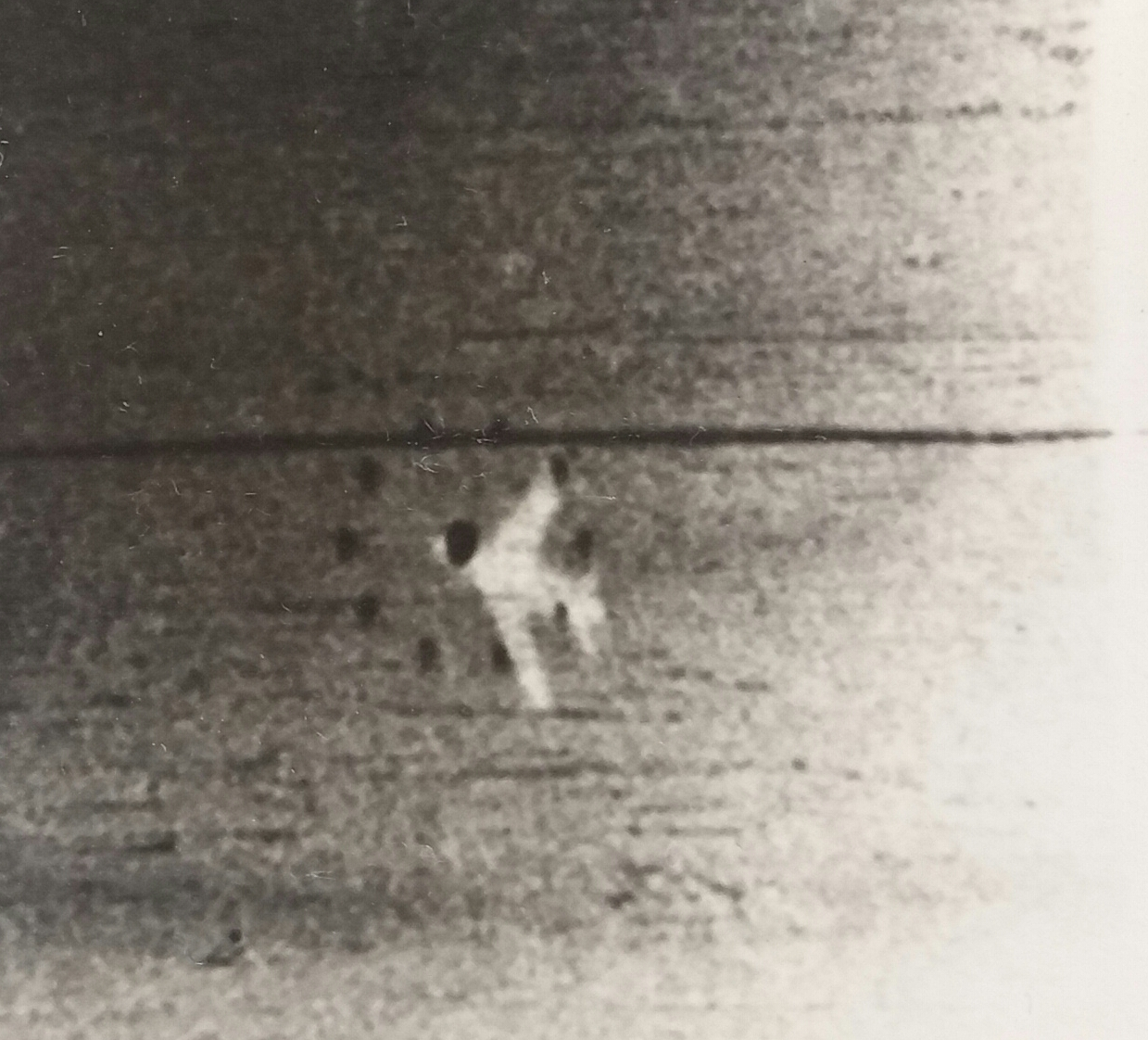
Indian Gnat being shot down by a PAF F-86F of the No. 26 Squadron over Srinagar

The Indo-Pakistani war of 1971 was a military confrontation between India and Pakistan that occurred during the Bangladesh Liberation War in East Pakistan and West Pakistan from 3 December 1971 to the Fall of Dacca (Dhaka) on 16 December 1971. The war saw intense use of aerial assets by both sides and proved to be instrumental in the Indian victory in East Pakistan (Bangladesh).

The following lists contains aerial victories credited to both Indian as well as Pakistani pilots.

== List of Notations Used ==
Abbreviation	Full form
IAF	Indian Air Force
PAF	Pakistan Air Force
Fg Offer	Flying Officer
Flt Lt	Flying Lieutenant
Wg Cdr	Wing Commander
Gp Capt	Group Captain

== Eastern sector (Bangladesh) ==
Probable or Unconfirmed kills are in italics text

Pilot	Pilot's Squadron	Country	Date	Aircraft Type	Victim Pilot	Victim Pilot's Squadron	Victim Aircraft	Remarks
Flt Lt M. A. Ganapathy	No. 22 Squadron IAF	India	22 Nov Battle of Boyra	Folland Gnat	Fg Offr Khail Ahmad	No. 14 Squadron PAF	Canadair Sabre Mk6	Fg Offr Ahmad taken POW, Ganapathy awarded Vir Chakra
Fg Offr Donald Lazarus	No. 22 Squadron IAF	India	22 Nov Battle of Boyra	Folland Gnat	Flt. Lt. Pervaiz Mehdi Qureshi	No. 14 Squadron PAF	Canadair Sabre Mk6	Flt Lt Qureshi taken POW, Lazarus awarded Vir Chakra
Flt Lt Roy Andrew Massey	No. 22 Squadron IAF	India	22 Nov Battle of Boyra	Folland Gnat	Wg Cdr Afzal Chaudhry	No. 14 Squadron PAF	Canadair Sabre Mk6	Chaudhary awarded Sitara-e-Jurat, his Sabre was severely damaged, but PAF claims that he returned to base, however Massey's wingman saw Chaudhary bail out. Massey awarded Vir Chakra
Wg Cdr Narinder Chatrath	No. 17 Squadron IAF	India	4th Dec	Hawker Hunter	Wg Cdr Muhammed Ahmed	No. 14 Squadron PAF	Canadair Sabre Mk6	Ahmed posthumously awarded Sitara-i-Juraat (
Flt Lt Jayendra Sukrut Raj	No. 4 Squadron IAF	India	4th Dec	MiG-21	Unidentified Pilot	No. 14 Squadron PAF	Canadair Sabre Mk6	The last unaccountable F86 was probably shot down by Sukurut Raj
Flt Lt Vinod Kumar Neb	No. 17 Squadron IAF	India	4th Dec	Hawker Hunter	Flt Lt Saeed Afzal Khan	No. 14 Squadron PAF	Canadair Sabre Mk6	Khan KIA.
Fg Offr Harish Masand	No. 37 Squadron IAF	India	4th Dec	Hawker Hunter	Flt Lt Saeed Afzal	No. 14 Squadron PAF	Canadair Sabre Mk6	Flt Lt Saeed Afzal bailed out KIA Masand awarded Vir Chakra
Wg Cdr Ramaswamy Sundaresan	No. 14 Squadron IAF	India	4th Dec	Hawker Hunter	Fg Offr Sahibzada Sajjad Noor	No. 14 Squadron PAF	Canadair Sabre Mk6	Sundersan awarded Vir Chakra
Sqn Ldr Dilawar Hussain	No. 14 Squadron PAF	Pakistan	4th Dec	Canadair Sabre Mk6	Flt Lt Kenneth Charles Tremenheere	No. 14 Squadron IAF	Hawker Hunter	Tremenhere S.D at Tejgaon and taken POW
Flt Lt Saeed Afzal Khan	No. 14 Squadron PAF	Pakistan	4th Dec	Canadair Sabre Mk6	Sqn Ldr Kanwal Deep Mehra	No. 14 Squadron IAF	Hawker Hunter	Khan awarded Sitara-i-Juraat; bailed out but MIA, Mehra S.D at Tejgaon but bailed out.

== Western sector ==
Probable Kills or Unconfirmed kills are in italics text;

Pilot	Pilot's Squadron	Country	Date	Aircraft Type	Victim Pilot	Victim Pilot's Squadron	Victim Aircraft Type	Remarks
Flt Lt Javed Latif	No. 23 Squadron PAF	Pakistan	4th Dec	Shenyang F6C	Flt Lt Harvinder Singh	No. 222 Squadron IAF	Sukhoi Su7	Singh MIA Latif awarded Tamgha-e-Jurat
Fg Off Qazi Javed	No. 25 Squadron PAF	Pakistan	4th Dec PAF Base Murid	Shenyang F6C	Fg Off Vidyadhar Shankarrao Chati	No. 27 Squadron IAF	Hawker Hunter	Chati bailed out and taken POW
Fg Off Salim Beg Mirza	No. 26 Squadron PAF	Pakistan	4th Dec PAF Base Peshawar	F-86F	Flt Lt Kotteiezath Puthiyavettil Muralidharan	No. 20 Squadron IAF	Hawker Hunter	Murlidharan KIA
Flt Lt Mujahid Salik	No. 15 Squadron PAF	Pakistan	4th Dec PAF Base Murid	F-86F	Fg Off Sudhir Tyagi	No. 27 Squadron IAF	Hawker Hunter	Tyagi posthumously awarded Vir Chakra
Fg Off Naeem Atta	No. 5 Squadron PAF	Pakistan	4th Dec	Dassault Mirage III	Flt Lt L Moses Sasoon; Flt Lt Ram Metharam Advani		English Electric Canberra	Sasoon and Advani KIA
Wng Cdr Cecil Vivian Parker	No. 20 Squadron IAF	India	4th Dec	Hawker Hunter	Unidentified Pilot		F-86E	
Wng Cdr Cecil Vivian Parker	No. 20 Squadron IAF	India	4th Dec	Hawker Hunter	Flt Lt Nayyar Iqbal	No. 17 Squadron PAF	F-86E	Iqbal KIA. According to Pakistani accounts and sources, the aircraft suffered an accidental flameout Parker awarded Maha Vir Chakra
Fg Off Sudhir Tyagi	No. 27 Squadron IAF	India	4th Dec	Hawker Hunter	Unidentified Pilot		F-86E/Mirage III	Tyagi awarded Vir Chakra Kill at PAF Base Murid.
Flt Lt Charan Singh Dhillon	No. 108 Squadron IAF	India	4th Dec	Hawker Hunter	Unidentified Pilot		F86E	Dhillon awarded Vayu Sena Medal
Wg Cdr Johnny Greene	No. 2 Squadron IAF	India	4th Dec	Folland Gnat F.1	Unidentified Pilot		Dassault Mirage III/Lockheed F-104 Starfighter	Intercepted and photographed while chasing a F-104 Starfighter over Ferozepur and prevented it from damaging the radar installations
Sqn Ldr Krishen Kumar Bakshi	No. 220 Squadron IAF	India	05 Dec	HAL HF24 Mk1	Unidentified Pilot		F-86E	Bakshi awarded Vir Chakra, aviation historians claim the unidentified Pakistani pilot was Fg Off Hamid Khawaja Naya Chor, Sindh and Dhoran, Kumbhalgarh, area.
Fg Off Safdar		Pakistan PAF Base Sakesar	05 Dec	Dassault Mirage III	Sqn Ldr Jal Maniksha Mistry	No. 20 Squadron IAF	Hawker Hunter 56A	Mistry posthumously awarded Vir Chakra.
Flt Lt Shahid Raza	No. 25 Squadron PAF	Pakistan	05 Dec	Shenyang F6C	Fg Off Kishan Lakhimal Malkani		Hawker Hunter	Malkani posthumously awarded Vir Chakra
Wing Cdr Saad A Hatmi	No. 25 Squadron PAF	Pakistan	05 Dec PAF Base Sakesar	Shenyang F6C	Flt Lt Gurmit Singh Rai	No. 27 Squadron IAF	Hawker Hunter	Rai bailed out Sakesar area.
Unidentified Pilot		Pakistan	05 Dec	F-86	Unidentified Pilot(s)		Alloutte III	Alloutte pilots safely bailed out
Flight Lieutenant Salimuddin	No. 5 Squadron PAF	Pakistan Battle of Chumb	06 Dec	Dassault Mirage III	Flt Lt Vijay Kumar Wahi	No. 101 Squadron IAF	Sukhoi Su-7	Wahi posthumously awarded Vir Chakra Jammu Sector
Unidentified Pilot		India	07 Dec	Hawker Hunter	Fg Off later Air Vice Marshal Hamid Khawaja	No. 15 Squadron PAF	F-86E	Pilot crashed while chasing Hunter, acc. to the PAF.
Flt Lt Cecil Choudhary	No. 5 Squadron PAF	Pakistan	07 Dec	F-86	Fg Off Adhi Rustamji Gandhi	No. 7 Squadron IAF	Sukhoi Su-7	
Fg Off Atiq Sufi	No. 11 Squadron PAF	Pakistan	07 Dec Samba	Shenyang F6C	Sqn Ldr Jiwa Singh		Sukhoi Su-7	Singh KIA
Wg Cdr M H Hashmi	No. 23 Squadron PAF	Pakistan	08 Dec	F-86E	Flt Lt Ramesh Gulabrao Kadam		Sukhoi Su-7 BMK	Kadam KIA PAF Risalewala.
Flt Lt Ramesh Gulabrao Kadam	TACDE	India	08 Dec PAF	Sukhoi Su-7 BMK	Flt Lt A J Siddiqui	No. 23 Squadron PAF	Shenyang F6C	F/L A J Siddqui is claimed by the PAF to have been shot while chasing Kadam's formation. The pilots of both sides were KIA.
Unidentified pilot		India	09 Dec	MiG-21FL	Unidentified Pilot		Dassault Mirage III EP	2 K-13 AAMs were launched and a proximity hit recorded. Target disappeared from radar. Listed as 'Probable'
Sqn Ldr Ravinder Nath Bhardwaj	No. 20 Squadron IAF	India	10 Dec	Hawker Hunter	Sqn Ldr Aslam Chaudhry	No. 26 Squadron PAF	F-86E	Chaudhry posthumously awarded Sitara-i-Jurat Bhardwaj awarded Maha Vir Chakra
Wg Cdr Arif Iqbal	No. 9 Squadron PAF	Pakistan	10 Dec	F-104A	Lt Cdr Ashok Roy (Pt) Lt H S Sirohi (Obs) Acmn O Vijayan (TG)		Bréguet Br.1050 Alizé	Roy, Sirohi and Vijayan KIA
Wg Cdr Bhukhari		Pakistan	11 Dec	F-86	Flt Lt Krishna Kumar Mohan		Sukhoi Su-7	Mohan KIA Shakargarh (Location)
Flt. Lt.Bharat Bhushan Soni	No. 47 Squadron IAF	India	12th Dec	MiG-21	Wg Cdr Mervyn L Middlecoat	No. 9 Squadron PAF	Lockheed F-104A Starfighter	Flt Lt Soni awarded Vir Chakra had spotted Middlecoat bail out and had rushed a rescue team from the nearest IAF station. However the rescue team found no trace of Middlecoat. He had ejected over shark infested waters, it was highly unlikely that he survived. Middlecoat posthumously awarded Sitara-e-Jurat
Sqn Ldr Viney Kapila		India	12th Dec	MiG-21FL	Unidentified Pilot		F-104A/F-86E	F-104A mentioned in official records, Kapila awarded Vir Chakra
Flt Lt Surinder Singh Malhotra		India	12 Dec	Sukhoi Su-7 BMK	Flt Lt Ejazuddin	No. 23 Squadron PAF	Shenyang F6C	Although initially PAF did not credit the kill but later accepted the loss of one F-6 over the general area of dogfight Malhotra awarded Vir Chakra
Sqn Ldr Farokh Jehangir Mehta		India	13th Dec	Hawker Hunter	Fg Off Nasim Nisar Ali Baig	No. 19 Squadron PAF	F-86	Beg KIA awarded Tamgha-i-Jurat Mehta awarded Vir Chakra
Flt Lt Kukke Sreekantasastry Suresh		India	13th Dec	Hawker Hunter	Unidentified Pilot		F-86	Suresh awarded Vir Chakra
Flt Lt Salim Baig Mirza	No. 26 Squadron PAF	Pakistan	14 Dec Srinagar Airfield	F-86	Fg Off Nirmal Jit Singh Sekhon	No. 18 Squadron IAF	Folland Gnat	Sekhon awarded Param Vir Chakra posthumously in 6:1 fight Mirza awarded Sitara-e-Jurat
Sqn Ldr S Gauhar		Pakistan	14 Dec	F-86	Capt P K Gaur		HAL Krishak	Observation Aircraft belonging to Indian Army
Wg Cdr M N Singh Sqn Ldr F J Mehta (Shared)	No. 122 Squadron IAF	India	15 Dec	Hawker Hunter T.66 (Two-seater)	Unidentified Pilot		F-86	Maneuver kill. Target flew into the ground.
Flt Lt Samar Bikram Shah		India	16 Dec	Mig-21FL	Unidentified Pilot		Shenyang F6C	F-6 Wreckage found by Indian Army
Flt Lt Virendera Singh Pathania	No. 18 Squadron IAF	India	16 Dec	Folland Gnat	Unidentified Pilot		North American F-86 Sabre	Unconfirmed Kill
Flt Lt Maqsood Amir		Pakistan	17 Dec	F-86	Flt Lt Tejwant Singh		Mig-21	Singh bailed out became POW Amir awarded Tamgha-i-Jurat
Flt Lt Niraj Kukreja	No. 29 Squadron IAF	India	17 Dec	MiG-21FL	Flt Lt Samad Ali Changezi	No. 9 Squadron PAF	F-104A	Changezi posthumously awarded Sitara-e-Jurat, Kukeraja awarded Vir Chakra
Unidentified Pilot		India	17 Dec	Hawker Hunter	Unidentified Pilot(s)		2x Cessna 0-1	Confirmed by PAF chronicler, John Fricker's, records

== List of aircraft mentioned ==
=== India ===
Aircraft	Country of origin
Aérospatiale Alouette III	France
Bréguet 1050 Alizé	France
English Electric Canberra	United Kingdom
Folland Gnat	United Kingdom
Hawker Hunter	United Kingdom
HAL HF-24 Marut	India
HAL Krishak	India
Mikoyan-Gurevich MiG-21FL	Soviet Union
Sukhoi Su-7BMK	Soviet Union

=== Pakistan ===
Aircraft	Country of origin
Canadair Sabre	Canada
Cessna O-1 Bird Dog	USA
Dassault Mirage III	France
Lockheed F-104A Starfighter	USA
North American F-86 Sabre	USA
Shenyang F6	China

== See also ==
- Battle Of Boyra
- Indo-Pakistani war of 1971
- East Pakistan Air Operations (1971)
- Operation Chengiz Khan
- Operation Cactus-Lily
