= Qureshi =

Qureshi is widely distributed surname in some Muslim countries.

The Dictionary of American Family Surnames states that it is of Arabic origin and "indicat[es] descent from the Quraish, the leading tribe in Mecca at the time of the birth of the prophet Muhammad".

It is a common surname in South Asia, especially in Pakistan (82%: 1,210,000, out of 1,470,000 worldwide), where it is the ninth most common surname. India has the second most (11%: 162,000). It is also present in parts of Western Asia, in Saudi Arabia (2.5%: 36,300), Iran, and England (0.65%: 9,580).

Families with the surname Qureshi in the Indian subcontinent claim inheritance from the Quraish tribe of ancient Mecca. Despite this, the majority of people with the surname Qureshi are overwhelmingly of northern South Asian descent.

== Notable people ==
- Abdul Najeeb Qureshi (born 1988), Indian sprinter from Hyderabad
- Abdul Subhan Qureshi, or Abdus Subhan (born 1972), fugitive from India wanted on terrorism charges
- Abdullah Qureshi (activist) (1935–2007), Pakistani activist
- Abu Ibrahim al-Hashimi al-Qurashi (1976–2022), leader of the Islamic State of Iraq and the Levant
- Ahsaan Qureshi, Indian stand-up comedian
- Aisam-ul-Haq Qureshi (born 1980), Pakistani professional tennis player
- Akhlaq Qureshi (born 1962), Italian Pakistani cricketer
- Altaf Hassan Qureshi (1932–2026), Pakistani Urdu journalist, political analyst, and author
- Amir Qureshi (born 1974), Pakistani football player
- Amjad Qureshi (1895–1972), Pakistani cricket umpire
- Asad Qureshi, British Pakistani filmmaker
- Ayessha Quraishi (born 1970), Pakistani artist
- Aziz Qureshi (1941–2024), 15th Governor of Mizoram, India
- Bashir Ahmed Qureshi (1959–2012), Sindhi nationalist from Pakistan
- Dulari Qureshi (born 1950), Indian art historian
- Faisal Qureshi (television personality), Pakistani TV director
- Farukh Qureshi (born 1986), Norwegian politician
- Faysal Qureshi (actor) (born 1973), Pakistani actor
- Fazal Ali Qureshi (1853 or 1854–1935), Islamic scholar and Naqshbandi sheikh from British India
- Fazal Qureshi (born 1961), Indian tabla player
- Ferdous Ahmed Qureshi (1941–2020), Bangladeshi politician and chairman of the Progressive Democratic Party
- Ghulam Samdani Qureshi (1929–1991), Bangladeshi poet and writer
- Habibullah Qurayshi (1865–1943), Bengali Islamic scholar
- Haider Qureshi (born 1953), Pakistani Urdu poet
- Huma Qureshi (born 1986), Indian actress and model
- Huma Qureshi (journalist), British Pakistani freelance journalist
- Iqbal Hussain Qureshi (1937–2012), Pakistani nuclear chemist
- Ishtiaq Hussain Qureshi (1903–1981), Pakistani historian and scholar
- Ismail Qureshi al Hashmi (1260–1349), Islamic preacher based in medieval India
- Javed Qureshi (born 1961), Pakistani cricketer
- Jazib Qureshi (1940–2021), Urdu poet
- Kamal Qureshi (born 1970), Danish Pakistani politician
- Kamran Qureshi (born 1975), British filmmaker
- Khalil Qureshi, Pakistani physical chemist
- M. Shahid Qureshi, Pakistani astrophysicist
- Mazhar Mahmood Qurashi, or Mazhar Mahmood Qureshi (1925–2011), Pakistani physicist
- Michael Qureshi (born 1976), Danish journalist
- Moeenuddin Ahmad Qureshi (1930–2016), Pakistani economist and political figure
- Mohammad Shafi Qureshi (1928–2016), Muslim politician from India
- Muhammad Hafeez Qureshi (1930–2007), Pakistani nuclear scientist and mechanical engineer
- Muhammad Hanif Qureshi, Pakistani artist
- Muhammad Muzammil Qureshi (born 1979), Pakistani politician
- Murad Qureshi (born 1965), British-Bangladeshi politician
- Mustafa Qureshi (born 1938), Pakistani film and television actor
- Nabeel Qureshi (author) (1983–2017), American author, speaker and Christian apologist
- Nabeel Qureshi (director) (born 1985), Pakistani film, television, and music video director
- Parvaiz Mehdi Qureshi (born 1943), Pakistan Air Force officer
- Pernia Qureshi, Indian Pashtun style icon and fashion entrepreneur
- Rafat Saeed Qureshi, Indian Urdu writer
- Rashid Qureshi, Pakistan Army general
- Reshma Qureshi, Indian model and vlogger
- Robina Qureshi (born 1964), Scottish human rights campaigner
- Sadiq Hussain Qureshi (1927–2000), Pakistani politician who served as both Governor and Chief Minister of Punjab Province
- Safi Qureshey, or Safi Qureshi, American Pakistani entrepreneur
- Sajid Qureshi (died 2013), Pakistani politician
- Sajjad Hussain Qureshi (1923–1996), 15th Governor of Punjab Province, Pakistan
- Saqib Saleem, or Saqib Saleem Qureshi (born 1988), Indian film actor and model
- Sarah Quraishi, Pakistani aerospace engineer
- Shah Abdul Majid Qureshi (1915–2003), Bangladeshi restaurateur and social reformer
- Shah Mehmood Qureshi (born 1956), Pakistani politician, agriculturist, and parliamentarian
- Shahid Ul Haq Qureshi (1945–unknown), Pakistani electrical engineer
- Subhan Qureshi (born 1959), biologist from Khyber Pakhtunkhwa, Pakistan
- Talal Qureshi, Pakistani DJ
- Taufiq Qureshi (born 1962), Indian classical musician
- Uzair Qureshi (born 1993), English cricketer
- Waheed Qureshi (1925–2009), Pakistani linguist
- Yasmin Qureshi (born 1963), British Labour Party politician and barrister
- Zakir Qureshi (1967–2025), Pakistani television chef

Others

- Aki Nawaz, or Haq Nawaz Qureshi (born 1961), British musician; part of the band Fun-Da-Mental; best known for playing drums with post-punk band Southern Death Cult, a forerunner to The Cult
- Alla Rakha, or Ustad Allarakha Qureshi (1919–2000), Indian tabla player

== See also ==
- Kureishi, surname
