= Battle of Boyra =

1971 battle of the Bangladesh Liberation War

- Part of India Pakistan war of 1971, East Pakistan Air Operations (1971) & Bangladesh Liberation War
Date	22 November 1971 (2.5 Minutes)
Location	Boyra Salient, which protrudes into East Pakistan (now Bangladesh) from north-eastern India.
Result	Indian victory: Boyra Bulge fell into Indian hands; Tactical retreat of Pakistan Army

Belligerents
India	Pakistan

Commanders and leaders
(India) Flt. Lt. Roy Andrew Massey	(Pakistan) Wing Commander Afzal Chaudhry

Units involved
No. 22 Squadron	No. 14 Squadron "Tail Choppers"

Strength
4x Folland Gnat	3x Canadair Sabre Mk6's.

Casualties and losses
None	2 Sabre shot down 1 Sabre damaged 2 PAF pilots captured.

The Battle of Boyra was a ground and aerial battle that was fought on 22 November 1971 between the India and Pakistan.

The Pakistani Army was engaged in combat against the Mukti Bahini (Bengali guerrilla fighters) and a division-sized detachment of the Indian Army during the Battle of Garibpur as part of the Bangladesh Liberation War. Pakistani ground forces requested air cover and close air support from the Pakistan Air Force (PAF). The PAF aircraft provided support to the Pakistani ground units. A detachment of four Folland Gnats was moved to Dum Dum (Kolkata Airport) from its parent base at Kalaikunda, near Kharagpur, over 100 km southwest, to intercept the Pakistan Air Force aircraft. Flight Lieutenant Roy Andrew Massey commanded the detachment.

The battle is significant as it was the first engagement between the air forces of India and Pakistan during the war and is seen as a culmination of the Battle of Garibpur in which the Mitro Bahini (the alliance of Mukti Bahini and Indian Armed Forces was named as Mitro Bahini meaning Allied Forces in Bengali) at battalion strength successfully invaded and captured area along the Garibpur.

Both sides suffered casualties during the battle, which also took place before the formal start of the Indo-Pakistani War of 1971.

== Background ==
After months of internal tensions in East Pakistan (now Bangladesh) leading up to the 1971 Bangladesh genocide and a clampdown on Bengali nationalists, many independence fighters had organised themselves into a guerilla army. Called the Mukti Bahini, the rebels were aided by India in their struggle by supply of constant arms training as well as serving Indian Army officers who fought alongside Mukti Bahini. After initial success over Pakistani troops, there had been some relative calm in the region, and further Indian assistance was sought to turn the tide. Economically burdened by nearly 10 million Bangladeshi refugees, India thus started to involve itself deeper into the conflict brewing in the east and stationed its troops near the border.

The Boyra salient, in the north-western East Pakistan, consisted of Garibpur and was at an important crossroads for both nations. Its control was thus vital, as it included a highway to Jessore from India.

On 21 November, the 14 Punjab Battalion, supported by PT-76 tanks from 45 Cavalry and the Mukti Bahini, moved in to capture the areas around Garibpur inside the Pakistani territory. The move was supposed to be a surprise, but a skirmish between patrol troops of both armies the previous day had caused Pakistan to be alerted to the impending attack. Pakistan immediately retaliated with its infantry battalion supported by 3rd Independent Armoured Squadron, equipped with M24 Chaffee light tanks. Retaining the infantry and the recoilless rifles in a defensive position, the Indian tanks were sent forward to ambush the oncoming Pakistani charge. In the next couple of hours, Indian troops resisted the Pakistani attack since Pakistan could not pinpoint the source of attacks because of poor visibility by fog. Undeterred, Pakistan tanks and infantry were thrown into an offensive against Indian defensive positions in a frontal assault. The resulting battle is now famous as the Battle of Garibpur.

As Pakistani troops were unable to dislodge entrenched enemy, the Mitro Bahini and the Indian Army, the Pakistani Army called in close air support. The Pakistani Air Force Contingent in Dhaka responded by launching several sorties of Canadair Sabre Mk6s from the morning of 22 November 1971, which set the stage for the Battle of Boyra.

== Order of Battle ==
The Pakistan Air Force unit involved was No 14. Squadron Tail-choppers, which had on strength 16 Canadair Sabre Mk6s. They were the Canadair-built versions of the F-86 Sabre that were upgraded with AIM-9 Sidewinder missiles and powered by the more powerful Avro Canada Orenda engine. The Sabres were smuggled into Pakistan through a clandestine deal that was organised between West Germany and Iran The squadron was commanded by Flight Lieutenant Parvaiz Mehdi Qureshi, who later rose to become the Chief of the Air Force.

The Indian Air Force unit involved was No. 22 Squadron IAF Swifts and was equipped with the diminutive Folland Gnat. The squadron was based in Kalaikunda Air Force Station and tasked with the air defence of the Calcutta Sector. A detachment was stationed at Dum Dum Airfield in Calcutta. The unit was under the command of Wing Commander BS Sikand, who later rose to the rank of air marshal.

Because the Gnat was compact, it was hard to spot, especially against haze at the low levels at which most of the dogfights took place during the war.

== Battle ==
The PAF aircraft were providing support the Pakistan Army ground units near the border area in Garibpur. The first of four Sabres were picked up in the Jessore area on Indian radar at 0811 hours. No.22 Squadron scrambled four Gnats from Dum Dum. A second raid by the Pakistanis followed at 1028 hours. An interception again could not be carried out in time, and the Sabres escaped to safety.

At around 1448 hours, the radar picked up the three Sabres as they pulled up in a north-westerly direction to about 2,000 ft (610 m) above ground level. Within a minute, the ORP at Dum Dum was scrambled. Four Gnats took off by 1451 hours led by the formation leader, Flight Lieutenant Roy Andrew Massey. Less than three minutes earlier, the Sabres had been detected by the radar.

The fighter controller in the sector was Flying Officer KB Bagchi, who vectored the Gnats to the Sabres and directed the interception. The Sabres had already carried out several attack runs during the eight minutes that it took the Gnats to reach the Boyra Salient and were starting to start another dive. They were at about 1,800 feet (550 m) altitude and were diving down to 500 feet (150 m) in an attack run.

The four Gnats separated into two sections and dived into the attack to bounce the Sabres. The first section of Gnats was of Massey and Flying Officer SF Soarez as his wingman. The second section consisted of Flight Lieutenant M A Ganapathy and Flying Officer D Lazarus. As the Gnats dived in, a section of two Sabres pulled out of the attack and placed themselves in an awkward position, just in front of Ganapathy and Lazarus. Both pilots opened fire with 30 mm autocannon fire, and both the Sabres were badly damaged. Ganapathy called out on the R/T, the Brevity code for "Murder Murder Murder". The Pakistani pilots (Parvaiz Mehdi Qureshi and Khaleel Ahmed) ejected over Boyra and parachuted down safely but were taken as prisoners-of-war. The wreckage of the abandoned Sabres fell near the village of Bongaon, in India.

Simultaneously, Massey pulled up over Ganapathy and Lazarus to latch onto another Sabre. The Sabre pilot, Wing Commander Chaudhury, in a skilful dogfighting move broke into Massey's attack and forced him to take a high angle-off burst, which missed his target. After manoeuvring back into firing position and taking aim, Massey let off another burst at 700 yards (640 m) and hit him in the port wing. By then, Massey's starboard cannon had stopped firing, but the Sabre streaked back into Pakistani territory and billowed smoke and fire. Massey realised that he was well over East Pakistani airspace in his chase and turned around and regrouped with the rest of his formation, which then proceeded back to base. Early on, it was thought that the badly damaged Sabre must have crashed soon afterward, but after the war, reports confirmed that Massey's victim, Wing Commander Chaudhury, showing considerable courage, had managed to fly his Sabre back to Tezgaon Airfield, outside Dhaka. Chaudhury claimed that he had shot down one of the Gnats, but Indian officials claimed that no aircraft were lost in the battle.

== Aftermath ==
The action took place in front of thousands of people and became one of the most enduring moments of the Bangladesh Liberation War and made all four Indian pilots instant celebrities in India and Bangladesh overnight. Their pictures are gun camera images (see external images) of the flaming sabres and those of the PAF prisoners-of-war were widely circulated by the media in the world.

- The Indian pilots were each awarded the Vir Chakra. The Fighter Controller Fg Offr KB Bagchi was awarded Vayusena Medal. Wg. Cdr. Sikand was awarded the Ati Vishisht Seva Medal (AVSM).
- Roy Andrew Massey would later command No. 224 Squadron of the IAF, which operated MiG-23MF. He died in a Mig-23 Crash from bird strike in November 1983 almost exactly 12 years later.
- Donald Lazarus went on to become the commanding officer of the No. 102 Squadron of the IAF (The Trisonics), which operated India's top-secret Mig-25s Mach 3 Reconnaissance aircraft. He attained the final rank of group captain (colonel) He later gave up his career and opted for early retirement to answer the call of God and served as a councillor and later director of Christian Mission Service (CMS), based in Coonoor, which mainly cares for destitute and orphaned children.
- MA Ganapathy died in service; beset with personal family problems, he committed suicide.
- Parvaiz Mehdi Qureshi would later go on to be the CAS of the PAF, a role in which he was famous for his forthright and straight-faced dealings. He looked after the interests of the PAF and prevented it from getting drawn into the Kargil War according to the wishes of General Pervez Musharraf and thus prevented that conflict from escalating, which may have resulted in nuclear war.
- Tezgaon Airfield was subjected to a severe offensive campaign by the IAF and was rendered inoperable by the third day after the formal declaration of war on 3 December 1971.

== See also ==
- Indo-Pakistani War of 1971
- List of aerial victories during the Indo-Pakistani War of 1971
- Timeline of the Bangladesh Liberation War
- Military plans of the Bangladesh Liberation War
- Mitro Bahini order of battle
- Pakistan Army order of battle, December 1971
- Evolution of Pakistan Eastern Command plan
- Operation Searchlight
- Indo-Pakistani wars and conflicts
- No.22 Squadron, Indian Air force

== Sources ==
- Air Chief Marshal Lal (retd), PC (1 May 1986). My Years with the Iaf. Lancer Publishers. ISBN 978-8170620082.
- Air Vice Marshal Tiwary (retd), Arun Kumar (17 October 2013). Indian Air Force in Wars. Lancer Publishers. ISBN 9781935501794.
- Islam, Mohammed Rafiqul (1981). A Tale of Millions: Bangladesh Liberation War, 1971. Bangladesh Books International.
