= Abdullah Qureshi =

Abdullah Qureshi may refer to:

- Abdullah Qureshi (activist)
- Abdullah Qureshi (singer)
- Abdullah Qureshi (artist)
