= M. A. Ganapathy =

Indian Air Force officer

Squadron Leader M. A. Ganapathy VrC
- Born: Kodagu
- Military career
- Allegiance: India
- Branch: Indian Air Force
- Rank: Squadron Leader
- Conflicts: Indo-Pakistani War of 1971
- Awards: Vir Chakra

Squadron Leader Mandepanda Appachu Ganapathy was a fighter pilot and officer of the Indian Air Force, known for his involvement in the Aerial Battle of Boyra during the Indo-Pakistani War of 1971. He was awarded the Vir Chakra for shooting down a PAF Sabre in the above-mentioned aerial battle

== Career ==
Ganapathy was commissioned as an officer in the Indian Air force on 16 May 1965 after graduating from the class of 92 Course. Five years later as war broke out between India and Pakistan, Ganapathy was posted with 22 Squadron IAF at the Dum Dum Airfield in Kolkata.

On the 22nd of November 1971, Canadair Sabres Mk6s of the PAF took up ground attack operations against Indian and Mukti Bahini troop positions near the town of Garibpur during the Battle of Garibpur.A formation of four Folland Gnats led by Flt Lt Roy Andrew Massey took off from the Dum Dum airfield to intercept the Sabres. Ganapathy, then a Flight Lieutenant, was the second man in the formation.

On reaching the battle area, the Gnats spotted the three Sabres performing ground attack operations. In the dogfight that ensued Ganapathy shot down a Sabre piloted by Fg Offr Khail Ahmad. Ganapathy's wingman Fg Offr Donald Lazarus shot down Flt Lt Pervaiz Mehdi Qureshi, who would later on become the Chief of Air Staff of the Pakistani Air Force. The formation leader, Andrew Massey severely damaged Wg Cdr Afzal Chouwdary's Sabre. All three pilots were awarded the Vir Chakra for this feat.

This aerial battle is significant as it was the first engagement between the Air Forces of India and Pakistan during the Bangladesh Liberation War in 1971 and also the first aerial victories of the war.

Ganapathy was later promoted to the rank of Squadron Leader, unfortunately he died in the 1970s under mysterious circumstances by committing suicide, possibly due to personal setbacks

== Vir Chakra ==
The citation for the Vir Chakra awarded to him reads:

CITATION

(Flight Lieutenant Mandepanda Appachu Ganapathy)

On 22 November 1971, at about 1450 hours order was given to intercept four Pakistani aircraft which had intruded into our territory. Flight Lieutenant Mandepanda Appachu Ganapathy who was detailed to fly as No. 3 in a formation of 4 Gnat aircraft proceeded to intercept the enemy. On sighting the enemy aircraft, he maneuvered his section and got behind one Sabre Jet and shot it down.

== See also ==
- Pervaiz Mehdi Qureshi
- Battle of Boyra
- No. 22 Squadron IAF
