= List of NRO beneficiaries =

The National Reconciliation Ordinance (NRO) was an ordinance issued by the former President of Pakistan, General Pervez Musharraf APML, on October 5, 2007 and former Prime Minister of Pakistan, Imran Khan founder and chairman of PTI, on 9 May 2023. It granted amnesty to politicians, political workers and bureaucrats who were accused of corruption, embezzlement, money laundering, murder, and terrorism between 1986 - 2007, the time between three states of martial law in Pakistan. It was declared unconstitutional by the Supreme Court of Pakistan on 16 December 2009, throwing the country into a political crisis. All names were supposedly kept in secrecy but the government was forced to declassify all the names after a successful intervention by the Supreme Court of Pakistan.

== List of NRO beneficiaries ==
The Government of Pakistan issued a list of 8041 individuals who benefited from NRO including 34 politicians. The list includes Nusrat Bhutto and several other politicals figures.

List of NRO beneficiaries - Politicians with cases under NAB HQ
S.No.	Name	Status	Province	Allegations	No. of Cases
1	Asif Ali Zardari	Former President of Pakistan	NAB HQ	10% in all projects started by PPP	1 x Trail case
2	Nawaz Sharif	Former PM of Pakistan	NAB HQ	1999 Army Chief Plane Hijacking case	1 x Trail case
3	Nawab Yousaf Talpur	Former MNA	NAB HQ	Co accused in URSUS Tractors case	1 x Trail case
4	Chaudhry Shaukat Ali Chandio	Ex Councilor Zila Council Lahore	Punjab	Zila Council Fraud case	2 x Trail case
5	Haji Kabir Khan	Former MNA	Punjab	Zila Council Fraud case	2 x Trail case
6	Chaudhry Zulfiqar	Ex Councilor Zila Council Lahore	Punjab	Zila Council Fraud case	2 x Trail case
7	Jahangir Badar	Former MNA	Punjab	Assets Corruption in SSGC	2 x Trail case
8	Malik Mushtaq Ahmed Awan	Former MNA	Punjab	Embezzlement in Octroi contracts	1 x Trail case
9	Rana Nazir Ahmed	Former MNA	Punjab	Assets case / Misuse of authority	2 x Trail case
10	Mian Rasheed	Former MPA	Punjab	Assets case / Illegal appointment	2 x Trail case
11	Tariq Anees	Former MPA	Punjab	Assets beyond means	1 x Trail case
12	Chaudhry Abdul Hammed	Former Mayor of Sargodha	Punjab	Assets beyond means	1 x Trail case
13	Mian Tariq Mehmood	Former MPA	Punjab	Assets beyond means	1 x Trail case
14	Agha Siraj Durrani	Former Education Minister of Sindh	Sindh	Misuse of authority	1 x Trail case
15	Aftab Ahmed Sherpao	Former CM KPK	Khyber-Pakhtunkhwa	Misuse of authority/ Illegal allotment of plots/ Assets case	2 Trail cases / 1 Invt (EB Inq)
16	Ghani ur Rehman	Former MPA	Khyber-Pakhtunkhwa	Assets beyond means	Ref 3/2000 Appeal in SC
17	Haji Gulsher	Former Senator	Khyber-Pakhtunkhwa	Misuse of authority/ Acquisition of land	Ref 9/2001 Appeal in SC
18	Habibullah Khan Khundi	Former Provincial Minister	Khyber-Pakhtunkhwa	Misuse of authority/ Acquisition of land	Ref 9/2001 AC
19	Mir Baaz Muhammad Khan Khethran	Former MNA	Balochistan	Misappropriation of Govt. funds allocated for Peoples Work Programs	1 x Invtg
21	Chaudhary Ahmed Mukhtar	Former Minister for Commerce and Industries	Punjab	Misuse of authority in issuing sugar exports permits to non-entitled persons in 1994	1 x inquiry
22	Sardar Mansoor Laghari	Former Provincial Minister	Khyber-Pakhtunkhwa	Misuse of authority/ Acquisition of land	1 x Trail case

List of NRO beneficiaries - Govt. Servants and others with cases under NAB HQ
S.No.	Name	Status	Province	Allegations	No. of Cases
23	Hussain Haqqani	Ambassador to the US	NAB HQ	Co accused in Ms BB case of TV Channel	1 x Invtg
24	(r) Brig. Aslam Hayat Qureshi	Former Federal Secretary	NAB HQ	Co accused in ARY Gold case.	1 x Trail Case
25	A R Siddiqi	Former Federal Secretary	NAB HQ	Co accused in AZZ and BB cases.	1 x Trail Case
26	Saeed Mehdi	Former Principal Secretary to PM	NAB HQ	Co accused in Polo Ground case	1 x Trail Case
27	Ahmed Sadiq	Former Principal Secretary to PM	Punjab	Assets beyond means	1 x Trail Case
28	Javed Qureshi	Former Chief Secretary Punjab	Punjab	fraud in ZCL's contracts	1 x Trail Case
29	Bureaucrat Anwar Hussain	SDO WAPDA	Punjab	Demanded Illegal gratification for TW connections	1 x Invtg
30	Saif Ullah Khan	LS WAPDA-LESCO	Punjab	Demanded Illegal gratification for TW connections	1 x Invtg
31	Syed Sultan Ali Shah	LS WAPDA	Punjab	Demanded Illegal gratification for TW connections	1 x Invtg
32	Bureaucrat Muhammad Arshad	LS WAPDA	Punjab	Non deposit of Rs 119,670/=	1 x Invtg
33	Syed Ehsan Ali Shah	LS WAPDA	Punjab	Corruption/Bribery	1 x Invtg
34	Munawar Hussain	ADE PTCL	Punjab	Corruption/Bribery	1 x Invtg
35	Muhammad Ashfaq Naz	Supdt PTCL	Punjab	Corruption/Bribery	1 x Invtg
36	Mirza Saeed Ahmed	LS WAPDA	Punjab	Misuse of authority. Causing loss to govt exchequer (Rs 0.442).	1 x Invtg
37	Akber Ali	Line Supdt	Punjab	Misuse of authority. Causing loss to govt exchequer (Rs 0.442).	1 x Invtg
38	Allah Wasaya	M/ Reader	Punjab	Misuse of authority. Causing loss to govt exchequer (Rs 0.442).	1 x Invtg
40	Hakim Din	NADRA office Kasur	Punjab	Issuance of forged NIC	1 x Invtg
41	Sardar Ali	Clerk NADRA	Punjab	Issuance of forged NIC	1 x Invtg
42	Nadir Khan	NADRA	Punjab	Issuance of forged NIC	1 x Invtg
43	Naeem Uddin	UDC MEO Sialkot	Punjab	Misappropriation of Rs .71M through 37 treasury receipts	1 x Invtg
44	Muhammad Hanif Ahmed Rahi	Former Assistant Audit Officer	Punjab	Raid trap case	1 x Trail Case
45	Abu Zar Jaffari	Former Cameraman	Punjab	Misappropriation of Govt Funds	2 x Invtgs
46	Hasham Bin Arshad	Former MNA	NAB HQ	Big Company PCO Corruption in 2008-2010	1 x Trail case
47	Imran Khan	Former PM of Pakistan	NAB HQ	Cypher No. I-0678/May 9 riots	1 x Trail Case
