= Kureishi =

Kureishi is a Pakistani surname. Notable people with the surname include:

- Hanif Kureishi (born 1954), British playwright, screenwriter, filmmaker, and novelist
- Omar Kureishi (1928–2005), Pakistani writer
- Maki Kureishi (1927–1995), Pakistani poet

== See also ==
- List of people with surname Qureshi
