= Gorakhpur Airport =

Domestic airport in Gorakhpur, Uttar Pradesh, India

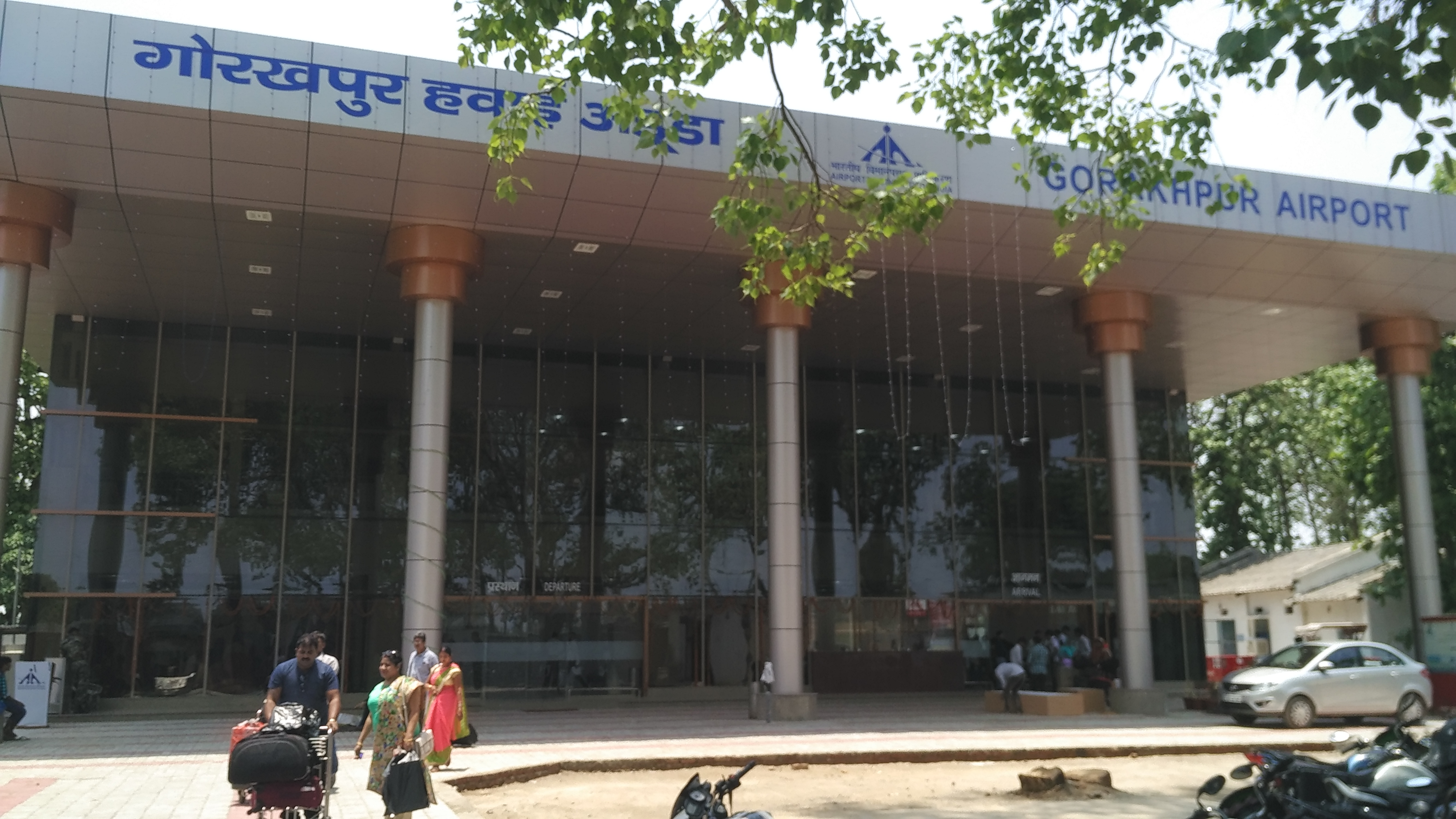
- IATA: GOP; ICAO: VEGK

Summary
- Airport type: Military/Public
- Owner: Indian Air Force
- Operator: Airports Authority of India
- Serves: Gorakhpur
- Location: Gorakhpur, Uttar Pradesh, India
- Elevation AMSL: 79 m (259 ft)
- Coordinates: 26°44′22″N 83°26′58″E

Map
- Location within Uttar Pradesh Location within India

Runways
Direction	Length		Surface
Direction	ft	m	Surface
11/29	9,000	2,743	Asphalt

Statistics (April 2025 - March 2026)
- Passengers: 11,22,776 (▲29.4%)
- Aircraft movements: 6,904 (▲22.2%)
- Cargo tonnage: 0 ( 0%)
- Source: AAI

Gorakhpur Airport (IATA: GOP, ICAO: VEGK) (proposed to be renamed as Mahayogi Gorakhnath Airport) is a domestic airport and an Indian Air Force base serving the city of Gorakhpur, in the state of Uttar Pradesh, India. The Airports Authority of India (AAI) operates it as a civil enclave at the Air Force base. The airport is located 8 km (5.0 mi) from the city centre. The airport covers an area of 0.71 acres (0.29 ha). In June 2017, the passenger terminal was inaugurated by the Chief Minister of Uttar Pradesh, Yogi Adityanath. It is the third busiest airport in Uttar Pradesh after Lucknow International Airport and Varanasi International Airport in terms of passenger traffic and aircraft movements.

== Air Force Station Gorakhpur ==
The airport is one of the bases of the Indian Armed Forces (IAF), which operates under Central Air Command of the Indian Air Force. IAF operates No. 16 Squadron IAF, No. 27 Squadron IAF and No. 105 Helicopter Unit from here. These squadrons have regular military exercises; other than this, they actively take part in rescue operations. SEPECAT Jaguar aircraft and Mil Mi-17 helicopters are based here.

According to a May 2024 report, the air base is being upgraded for the joint deployment of MQ-9B drones of Indian Army and Indian Air Force along with Sarsawa AFS.

== Infrastructure ==
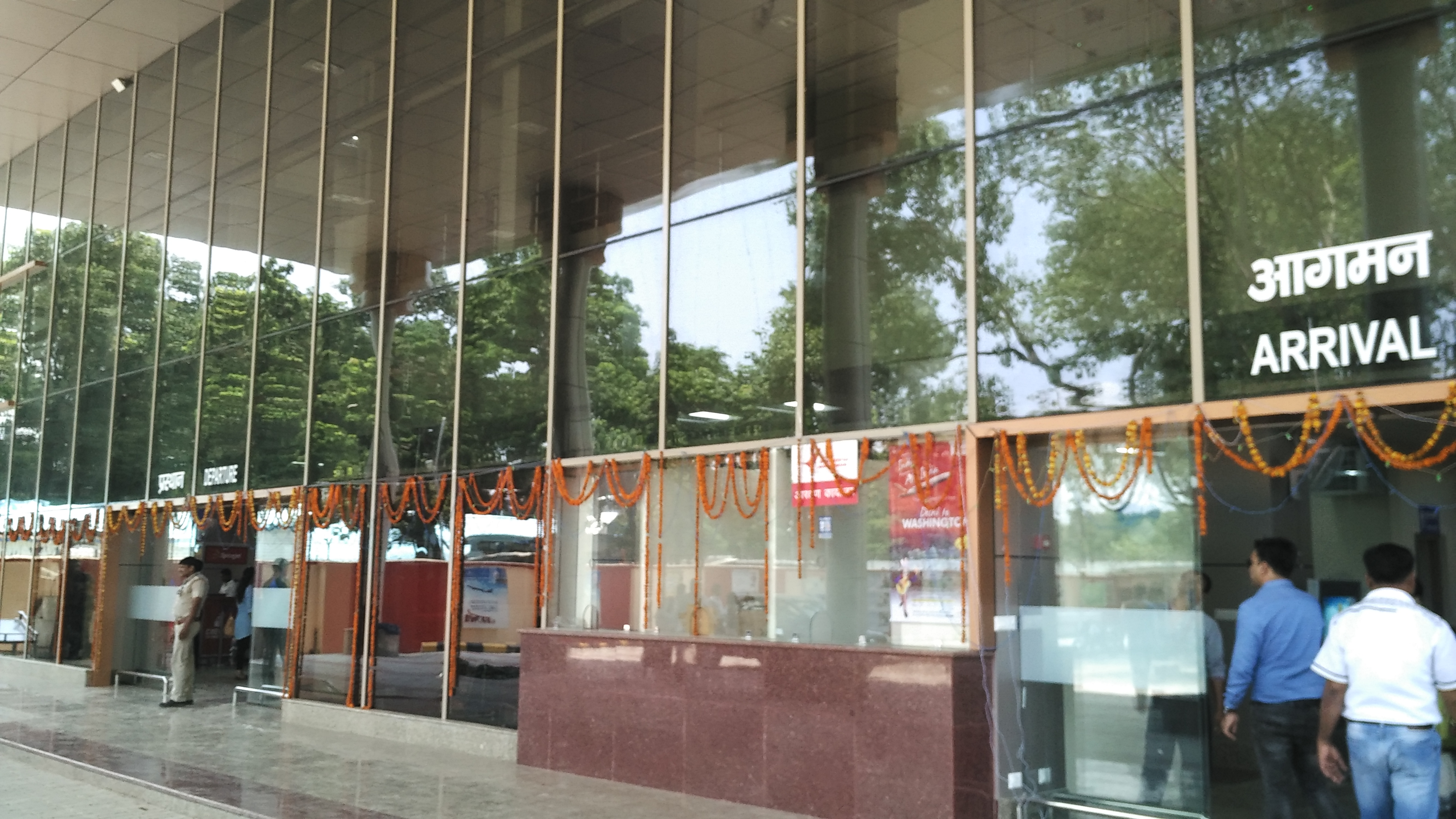
Front view of the airport's terminal

The airport has one runway, designated 11/29, and has dimensions of 2,743 by 46 metres (9,000 ft × 150 ft). The existing terminal can handle 200 passengers in peak hours, and has an area of 23,500 sq.ft.

On 28 March 2021, the Chief Minister of Uttar Pradesh, Yogi Adityanath laid the foundation stone for the extension of the existing terminal building at a cost of ₹26.87 crore, which will be spread in an area of 3,440 sq.m. Equipped with two conveyor belts in the arrival hall, 10 check-in-counters, escalators, lifts, restaurant and an additional security holding area in the first floor, the extended terminal building will be able to handle the 200 passengers during peak hours.

== Airlines and destinations ==
Airlines	Destinations
Akasa Air	Bengaluru, Delhi
Alliance Air	Delhi
IndiGo	Bengaluru, Delhi, Hyderabad, Kolkata, Mumbai, Navi Mumbai
SpiceJet	Delhi, Mumbai

== Future ==
A new terminal which can handle 10 aircraft at a time is proposed and construction work is supposed to start by March 2025.

== See also ==
- Airports in India
- List of the busiest airports in India
