= Cecil Vivian Parker =

Indian Air Force officer

Air Vice Marshal Cecil Vivian Parker MVC VM
- Born: Secunderabad, India
- Military career
- Allegiance: India
- Branch: Indian Air Force
- Rank: Air Vice Marshal
- Unit: No. 20 Squadron IAF "Lightnings"
- Commands: No. 20 Squadron IAF "Lightnings"; 8 Wing IAF
- Conflicts: Indo-Pakistani War of 1965; Indo-Pakistani War of 1971
- Awards: Maha Vir Chakra; Vayu Sena Medal

Air Vice Marshal Cecil Vivian Parker, MVC, VM is a former air officer of the Indian Air Force. During the Indo-Pakistani War of 1971, he was awarded the Maha Vir Chakra, India's second highest military decoration. He last served as the Commandant of the Air Force Academy.

== Early life ==
Parker was born in Secunderabad, India, to P. R. and E. S. Parker.

== Military career ==
Parker was commissioned into the Indian Air Force on 31 August 1952. He saw action in both the 1965 and 1971 Indo-Pakistani Wars.

In October 1966, as wing commander, he formed an operational training unit and was the unit's first commanding officer. Here, he implemented a high level of instructional technique, standardisation and ensured a high quality of training for the pupils that passed through the unit, for which he was awarded the Vayu Sena Medal.

=== Indo-Pakistani War of 1971 ===
During the 1971 war, he was the commanding officer of No. 20 Squadron IAF, a fighter-bomber squadron equipped with Hawker Hunter aircraft. He led a number of deep penetration missions into Pakistani territory, attacking heavily defended targets, including airfields, oil refineries and in support of Army operations. On one such mission, his formation was attacked by Pakistani F-86 Sabre aircraft. In the ensuing air fight, Wing Commander Parker shot down one Sabre and heavily damaged another. During another strike mission, Wing Commander Parker attacked an oil refinery at Attock, Pakistan, in the face of intense anti-aircraft and small-arms fire, causing serious damage to the refinery. For bravery and leadership displayed in combat missions, Wing Commander Parker was awarded the Mahavir Chakra, India's second highest military award.

Wing Commander Parker led what was later called the greatest IAF air strike and acknowledged by a Pakistani Air Force officer Air Commodore, M. Kaiser Tufail (retd.), in his book 'In the Ring and on Its Feet'. In the book, he wrote that Indian Hunter aircraft destroyed five Pakistani F-86 Sabre jets during the raid on an airbase at Murid. The F86 was the Pakistan Air Force's premiere aircraft and the single greatest challenge for the IAF in air battles in the 1965 and 1971 wars.

=== Maha Vir Chakra Citation ===
The citation for the Maha Vir Chakra reads as follows:

Gazette Notification: 20 Pres/72,12-2-72

Operation: 1971 Date of Award: 15 December 1971

CITATION

WING COMMANDER CECIL VIVIAN PARKER, VM

(4346) FLYING (PILOT)

Wing Commander C. V. Parker, the officer commanding of a fighter-bomber squadron, led many deep penetration missions into enemy-held territory attacking strongly defended targets. While returning from one such mission his formation was attacked by enemy Sabre aircraft. In the ensuing fight, Wing Commander Parker shot one Sabre and heavily damaged another. In another mission, Wing Commander Parker attacked the enemy oil refinery at Attock in the face of intense anti-aircraft and small arms fire and caused serious damage to it.

Throughout the operations, Wing Commander Parker displayed conspicuous gallantry and outstanding leadership.

=== Post-war career ===
During his career in the IAF spanning 35 years, he created a record of flying 22 types of aircraft and logged 3,850 flying hours.

Parker later rose to the rank of Air Vice Marshal in July 1983, before retiring on 31 Aug 1986.

== Writing ==
Parker wrote a book, AIRLOOMS – Random Recollections of an Ancient Aviator.

Military offices
Preceded by Rajagopal Sriramulu Naidu	Commandant of the Air Force Academy; 1983 - 1985	Succeeded by Jagdish Kumar Seth
