= 45th Cavalry (India) =

Indian Army regiment

45 Cavalry
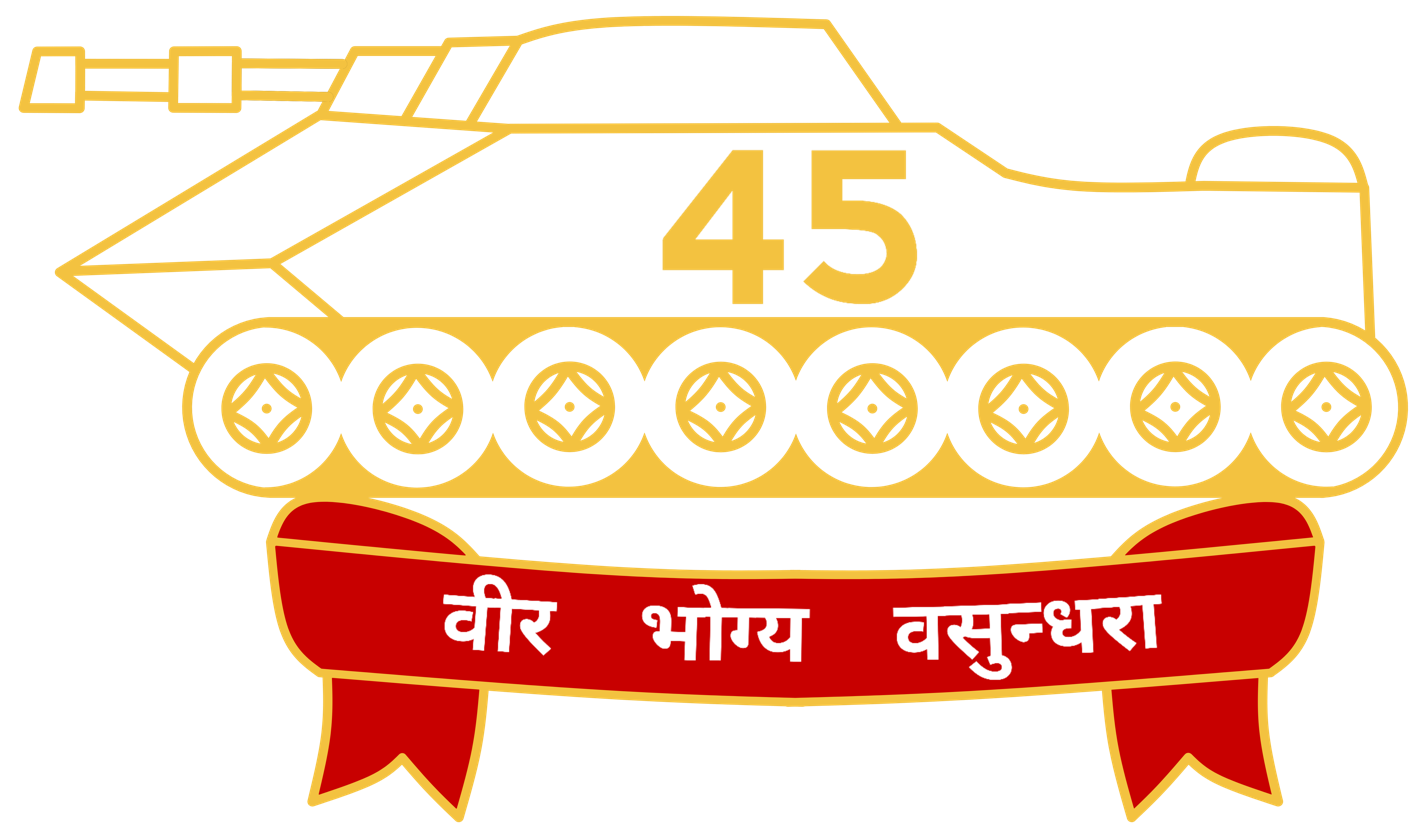
- Active: 1918-19, 1941-1946, 1965-present
- Country: British India; India
- Branch: British Indian Army; Indian Army
- Type: Armoured Regiment
- Nickname: Paintalis Risala
- Mottos: वीर भोग्या वसुंधरा Veer Bhogya Vasundhara (The World is for the Brave)
- Equipment: T-90 Main Battle Tank
- Engagements: Indo-Pakistani War of 1971; Battle of Garibpur
- Decorations: Maha Vir Chakra 2 Vir Chakra 1 Sena Medal 2
- Battle honours: Darsana

Commanders
- Colonel of the Regiment: Lieutenant General Rajesh Pushkar
- Notable commanders: Lt General Amit Sharma

45 Cavalry is an armoured regiment in the Armoured Corps of the Indian Army. The regiment distinguished itself in operations during the 1971 Indo-Pakistan War winning one Maha Vir Chakra.

== Raising ==
The first 45th Cavalry was formed in August 1918 from

- a squadron of 20th Deccan Horse
- a squadron of 34th Prince Albert Victor's Own Poona Horse
- a squadron of 36th Jacob's Horse
- a squadron of 38th King George's Own Central India Horse

It was disbanded in 1919.

It was re-raised in April 1941 at Meerut under Major CPJ Prioleau. The troops were Sikhs, Pathans and Dogras drawn from the 13th Lancers, Scinde Horse & Guides Cavalry and equipped with Stuart light tanks. They served in Burma as part of 50th Indian Tank Brigade, entering Burma in December 1944 in the Arakan and returning in March 1945 to India to upgrade to Sherman tanks. Post war, the regiment was disbanded in April 1946.

The Regiment was raised again as an Indian Cavalry Regiment at Kandahar Lines, Delhi Cantonment by Lieutenant Colonel SK Candade on May 16, 1965.

== Composition ==
The troops of the regiment presently comprises two thirds South Indian Classes (SIC) and one third Others Indian Communities (OIC).

== Equipment ==
Between 1941 and 1946, the regiment had the Stuart light tanks followed by the Sherman tanks. On re-raising, it was equipped with the amphibious PT-76 tanks. B squadron was converted to T-55 tanks. In due course, the aging warhorses, the PT-76 tanks were phased out, the regiment re-equipped and subsequently converted all its squadrons to the up-gunned version of the T-55 main battle tanks. The regiment is presently equipped with the T-90 tanks.

== Operations ==
The regiment during the 1971 war
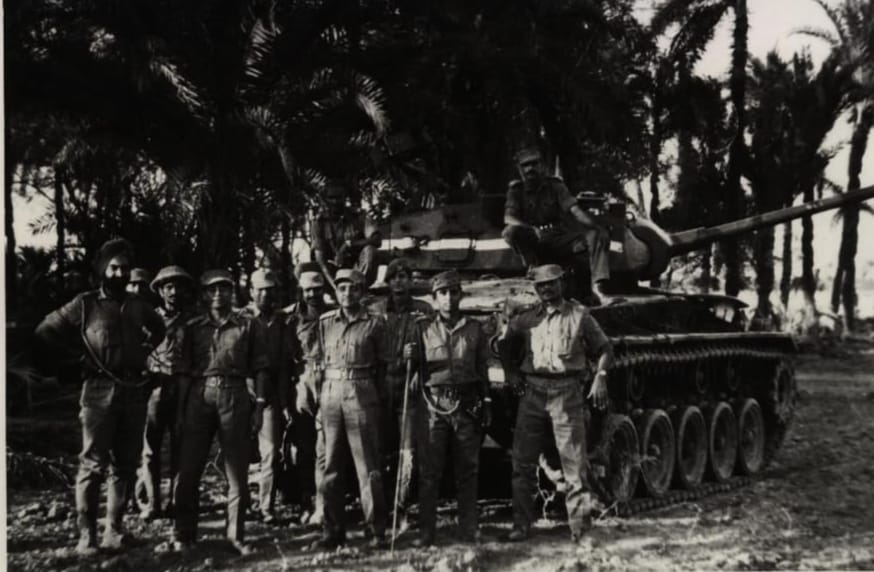
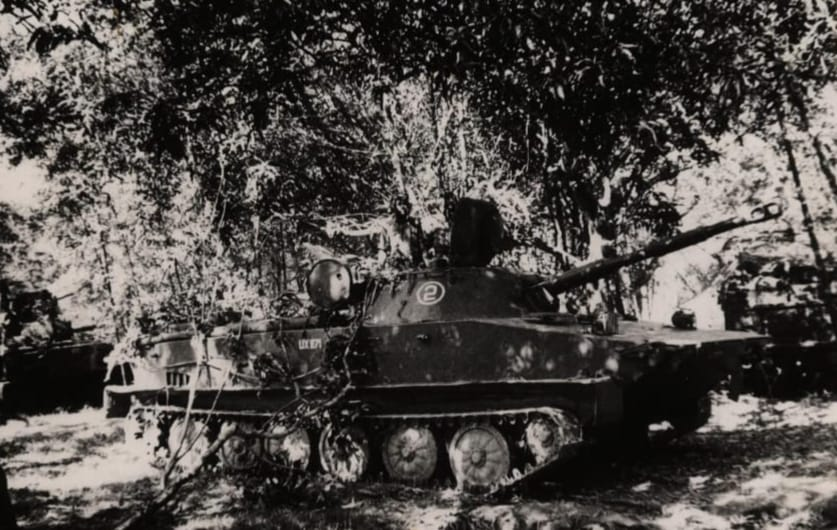
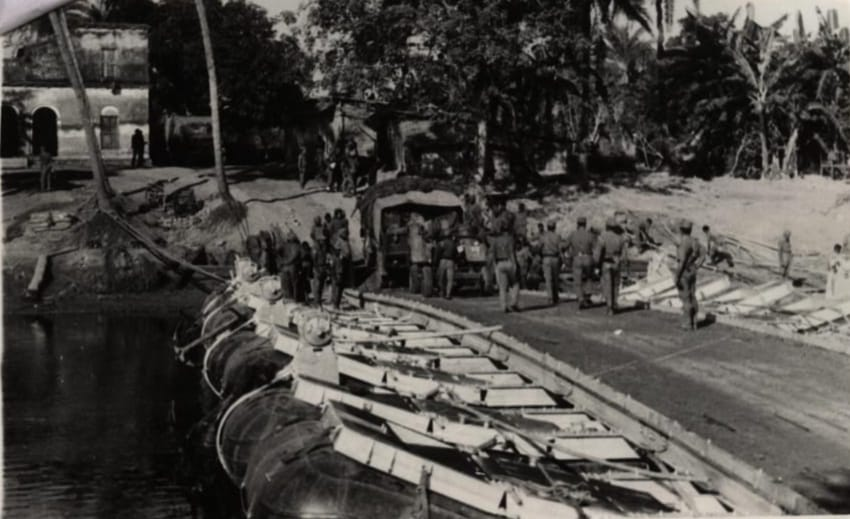
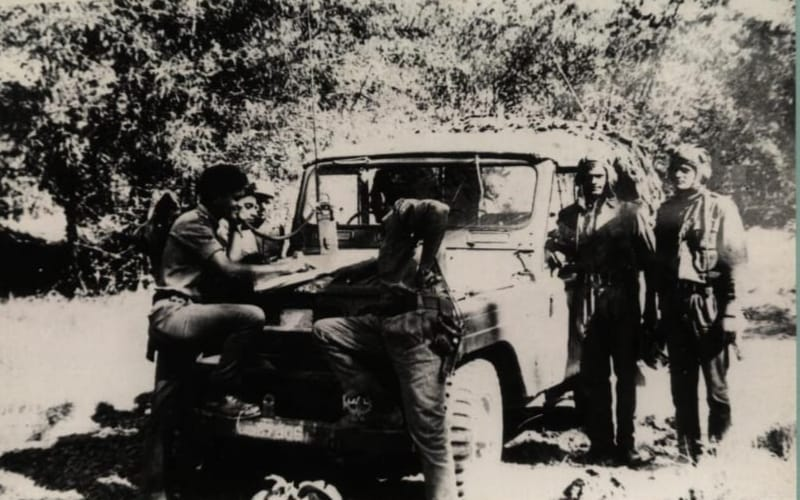

Indo-Pakistani War of 1965

During the 1965 war, it was designated as an Armoured Delivery Regiment of the Indian Army.

Indo-Pakistani War of 1971

The unit took part in the Indo-Pakistani War of 1971 in East Pakistan (now independent Bangladesh). The regiment with its B and C squadrons were under the command of 9th Infantry Division, whereas A squadron was under 4 Mountain Division . The regiment was then equipped with Russian PT-76 light battle tanks and fought in the Battles of Garibpur, Kushtia and Jessore.

The Battle of Garibpur fought on 20 – 21 November 1971 by the 14th Battalion, the Punjab Regiment (Nabha Akal) along with ‘C’ Squadron, 45 Cavalry would go down in history as one of the few battles in which a Battalion (usually numbering around 350 - 600 men) was able to defeat a vastly numerically superior Brigade (usually numbering around 2000 - 3500 men). Both sides were supported by tanks and aircraft.

For conspicuous gallantry, the Regiment was awarded Battle Honour Darsana and Theatre Honour East Pakistan. The gallantry award winners include -

- Maha Vir Chakra : Major D S Narang MVC (Posthumous)
- Vir Chakra : Risaldar RP Singh, VrC
- Sena Medal : 2nd Lieutenant S Chandravarkar SM (Posthumous), Major H S Puri SM
- Mentioned in dispatches : Captain Balram Singh Mehta, Daffadar Gopalan Nair Sisupanan, Sowar Mohan Singh, Naib Risaldar Athinarayanan

Other operations

The regiment has taken part in counter insurgency operations in Jammu & Kashmir.

== Achievements ==
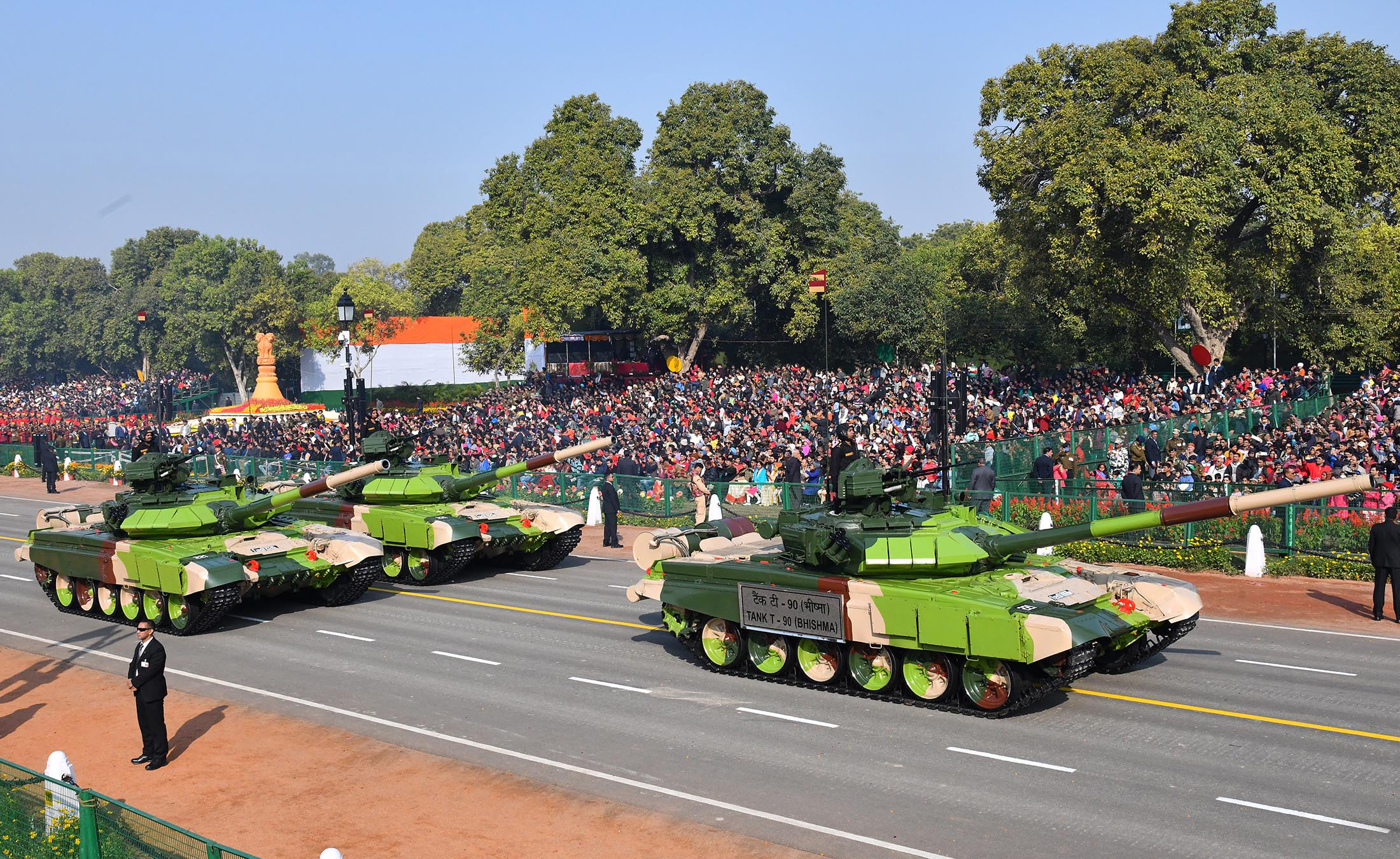
T- 90 (Bhishma) of 45th Cavalry passes through the Rajpath, at the 70th Republic Day Celebrations, 2019

The Regiment holds the proud distinction of being the first armoured regiment to be bestowed with both the 'Guidon' and the 'Standard' for meritorious service to the nation in both war and peace. The Regiment had the honour of participating in the Republic Day parade in 2019 with their T-90 tanks.

== Regimental Insignia ==
The cap badge of the regiment between 1941 and 1946 consisted of the numeral ‘45’ with a scroll above with the words ‘Indian Armoured Corps’ and one below with the word ‘Cavalry’. The present insignia consists of the PT-76 tank with a scroll below, inscribed with the regimental motto.

The motto of the regiment is वीर भोग्या वसुंधरा (Veer Bhogya Vasundhara), which translates to ‘The World is for the Brave’.

== In popular culture ==
The Regiment was prominently featured in 2023 war movie Pippa, starring Ishaan Khatter and directed by Raja Krishna Menon. It was based on the book 'The Burning Chaffees' authored by Brigadier Balram Mehta. The film revolves around Captain Balram Mehta, 2iC of C Squadron, under Major Daljit Singh Narang of the unit. The story depicts the semi-fictional storyline of several real-life characters focused on the events of Battle of Garibpur during the Bangladesh Liberation War. In May 2026, Ishaan Khatter was conferred with an honorary membership of the Officers' Mess of 45th Cavalry..

== Bibliography ==
- Gaylor, John (1996). Sons of John Company: The Indian and Pakistan Armies 1903–1991 (2nd ed.). Tunbridge Wells: Parapress. ISBN 1-898594-41-4.
- Perry, F.W. (1993). Order of Battle of Divisions Part 5B. Indian Army Divisions. Newport: Ray Westlake Military Books. ISBN 1-871167-23-X.
- Mehta, Balram Singh (2016). The Burning Chaffees. India: KW Publishers Pvt Ltd. ISBN 978-9383649853.
