= Abdullah Qureshi (artist) =

Abdullah Qureshi (born 1987) is a Queer Muslim Pakistani cis-male artist, social activist, curator, educator, and cultural producer. Qureshi utilizes paint, watercolor, film, and faceless depictions of his male friends to capture his personal histories, trauma, and childhood memories surrounding his identity as a Queer Muslim Pakistani man. Qureshi explores his identity in his work within an Abstract Expressionist style using large canvases.

== Early life and education ==
Qureshi was born in 1987 in Lahore, Pakistan. In 2010, he earned a Bachelor of Arts in Fine Art from the Chelsea College of Art and Design in London where he continued his enrollment for a Master of Arts degree in Fine Art. In 2017, he attended and completed his Ph.D. from Aalto University. During the fall of 2019, he became a visiting graduate student at the Centre for Feminist Research at York University.

He moved back to Lahore, where he created visual work responding to the intersectional identities of the queer, Pakistani, and Muslim culture. There, he co-founded a gallery for artists and designers who were interested in destabilizing institutional boundaries called “39K”.

Qureshi lives in Helsinki, Finland.

== Works, exhibitions, projects, collections ==
=== Art presentations ===
- National Gallery of Art, Islamabad, Pakistan
- Alhamra Art Gallery, Lahore, Pakistan
- Rossi & Rossi, London, England
- Uqbar, Berlin, Germany
- Twelve Gates Arts, Philadelphia, Pennsylvania
- SOMArts Cultural Center, San Francisco, California

=== Solo exhibitions ===
- Multi-media exhibition titled “Darkrooms: retracing childhood memories”
- Visual diary titled “The Story of Myself and Some Friends in these Fragments of Daily Loves” presented at the Zahoor Ul Akhlaq Gallery

=== Group exhibitions ===
- “Sind wir schon da?” curated by Julia Feldmann and Silke Paintinger, Universität für angewandte Kunst, Vienna

=== Short films ===
- Qureshi’s 2019 experimental short film titled “Journey to the CharBagh”

=== Artistic co-advisor ===
- Qureshi and two other advisors advised a show titled “River in an Ocean”
