= Omar Kureishi =

Pakistani writer (1928–2005)

- Born: 1928; Murree, British India
- Died: 14 March 2005 (aged 77); Karachi, Pakistan
- Education: BA, International Relations
- Alma mater: University of Southern California
- Occupations: Commentator, Public Relations, journalist, writer
- Employer(s): Dawn; Pakistan International Airlines; The Times of Karachi; Radio Pakistan

Omar Kureishi (1928 – 14 March 2005) was a Pakistani writer. He had also worked in the advertising, aviation and journalism industries, writing for Dawn, The Pakistan Times, Morning News and The Guardian, London. He is best known for his cricket writings and commentary but he was also a keen observer of political and social developments and wrote about them, in his own words, not with fury, but certainly with "exasperation and anger".

He died of heart disease on 14 March 2005, at the age of 77, leaving behind his widow, a son, Javed, and two grandchildren. He was awarded the Sitara-i-Imtiaz (Star of Excellence) in 2001 by the President of Pakistan.

== Family background and education ==
Kureishi's father, M. A. Kureishi, was a member of the Indian Medical Service. He had 11 siblings and his family was frequently on the move because of their father's many postings across pre-partition India. Omar Kureishi took a degree in International Relations from the University of Southern California in the early 1950s. He has one son, Javed Kureishi, and two grandchildren, Saif and Tanya Kureishi. Omar Kureishi was a classmate of Zulfikar Ali Bhutto in school in Mumbai and later at USC.

== Life as a journalist, writer and socialite ==
Kureishi briefly worked with a radio station and also played a small part in a Hollywood movie. He came to Karachi in the mid-1950s and joined the defunct Pakistan Standard. Later, he became resident editor of the Times of Karachi. His brother, Sattoo Kureishi, lived near Karachi airport in a house called Air Cottage, where he used to hold regular weekly get-togethers. "Friday Evenings at Air Cottage" became a byword in Karachi's intellectual and avant-garde circles, and Omar Kureishi soon became an integral part of the set.

He filed dispatches for many newspapers in Pakistan and abroad during his cricket commentating career, but he wrote most regularly for Dawn for a period spanning over 25 years. He did columns based on cricket, as well as those based on his memories of his time abroad in the US and traveling around the cricket world, in addition to his time in Mumbai and Delhi. His books include Black Moods, Out to Lunch, The System, The Other Side of Daylight, As Time Goes By and Once Upon a Time.

== Life as cricket commentator ==
Kureishi's devotion to cricket, in his own words, started as "a passion" and eventually became "a love affair" which "remained a constant" in his life through all its "ups and downs". Though he had never played first-class or Test cricket (his only exposure to competitive cricket at an organised level was a brief stint in club cricket in the UK when he went there during his life as student), he was recognised as an outstanding and extremely knowledgeable cricket commentator. He shared the Test Match Special commentary box during Pakistan's early tours to England and together with Jamsheed Marker, he was a regular voice on the airwaves in Pakistan during the late 1950s and '60s. Bill Frindall, the TMS statistician, described him as "a lively, witty and popular colleague" and called him "the voice of Asian sport". Omar Kureishi counted many cricketers, most notably Abdul Hafeez Kardar, as his close friends.

The media centre at the Qadhafi Stadium in Lahore is named after him. He was also a member of the International Cricket Council panel that selects the world's best Test and one-day international players for its annual awards.

He managed the Pakistan cricket tours to England in 1974 and New Zealand in 1978–79.

== See also ==
- List of Pakistani journalists
