= No. 27 Squadron IAF =

No. 27 Squadron Flying Arrows
- Insignia of The No. 27 Squadron IAF "Flying Arrows"
- Active: 15 February 1957 – present
- Country: Republic of India
- Allegiance: Indian Armed Forces
- Branch: Indian Air Force
- Role: Fighter
- Part of: Central Air Command (India)
- Garrison/HQ: Gorakhpur AFS
- Nickname: "Flaming Arrows"
- Mottos: Durarakshya Saralakshya; Strike far, Strike Sure

Aircraft flown
- Attack: SEPECAT Jaguar IS (1985 - Present) Hawker Hunter (1958 - 1985) De Havilland Vampire (1957 - 1959)

No. 27 Squadron IAF nicknamed as Flaming Arrows is a Ground Attack and Close Air Support squadron of the Indian Air Force, operating from Gorakhpur AFS, under Central Air Command.

== History ==
The squadron was raised at Adampur AFS on 15 February 1957, with de Havilland Vampires, as a Ground-Attack and Close Air Support unit. The Vampires were replaced by September, the next year, with Hunter Mk.56 aircraft, when it was moved to Ambala AFS.

It had its first taste of war during the 1961 war in Goa, tasked to participate in Operation Vijay, strafing various ground targets and airfields.

=== Indo-Pakistan War of 1965 ===
During the 1965 Indo-Pakistan War, the squadron operated from Halwara under the Western Air Command, carrying out Air Defence and Ground Attack missions over Punjab.

On 7 September, at 0615 hours, five aircraft of the squadron participated in an attack on Chota Sargodha Air Base, in Pakistan. Then Flight Lt. D.N. Rathore destroyed at least two PAF F-86 Sabres parked in the airbase. The squadron flew Reconnaissance, Opportunity, and CAS missions in the Gujranwala sector, in the Sialkot-Lahore-Ferozpur axis and in the Khemkaran-Kasur Sector, destroying several enemy tanks and contributing to the "Graveyards of Pattons there". These actions were at a high cost though, the squadron lost five aircraft and two pilots. It earned 2 Vir Chakras, and 5 Mention-in-Despatches.

=== Indo-Pakistan War of 1971 ===
In April 1965, at Halwara, all the Hunter Mk. 56 aircraft were replaced with Hunter Mk. 56A, and its role changed to Deep Penetration Strike and Fighter Recon. In July 1971, the squadron was relocated to Pathankot.

In December, during the 1971 War with Pakistan, the squadron carried out a number of sorties over Poonch Sector, providing CAS to ground units. In addition, the squadron flew Combat Air Patrols over army concentration areas, to intercept any Pakistani aircraft. On 7 December, the squadron shifted its missions, providing CAS in the Chhamb–Akhnoor Sector.

=== Post-War period ===
In January 1985, the squadron was re-equipped with Jaguar IS aircraft. The squadron won several trophies in various exercises and gunnery meets, and participated in various operations. On 13 November 1996, it was awarded President Colour for its contributions both in war and peace.

=== Assignments ===
- Liberation of Goa
- Indo-Pakistan War of 1965
- Indo-Pakistan War of 1971

== Aircraft ==
Aircraft types operated by the squadron

Aircraft type	From	To	Air base
de Havilland Vampire FB52	15 February 1957	September 1958	AFS Adampur
Hawker Hunter MK 56	November 1958	January 1985	
SEPECAT Jaguar IS	February 1985	Present	AFS Gorakhpur
