= No. 14 Squadron PAF =

Air superiority squadron of the Pakistan Air Force

No. 14 Squadron Tail Choppers
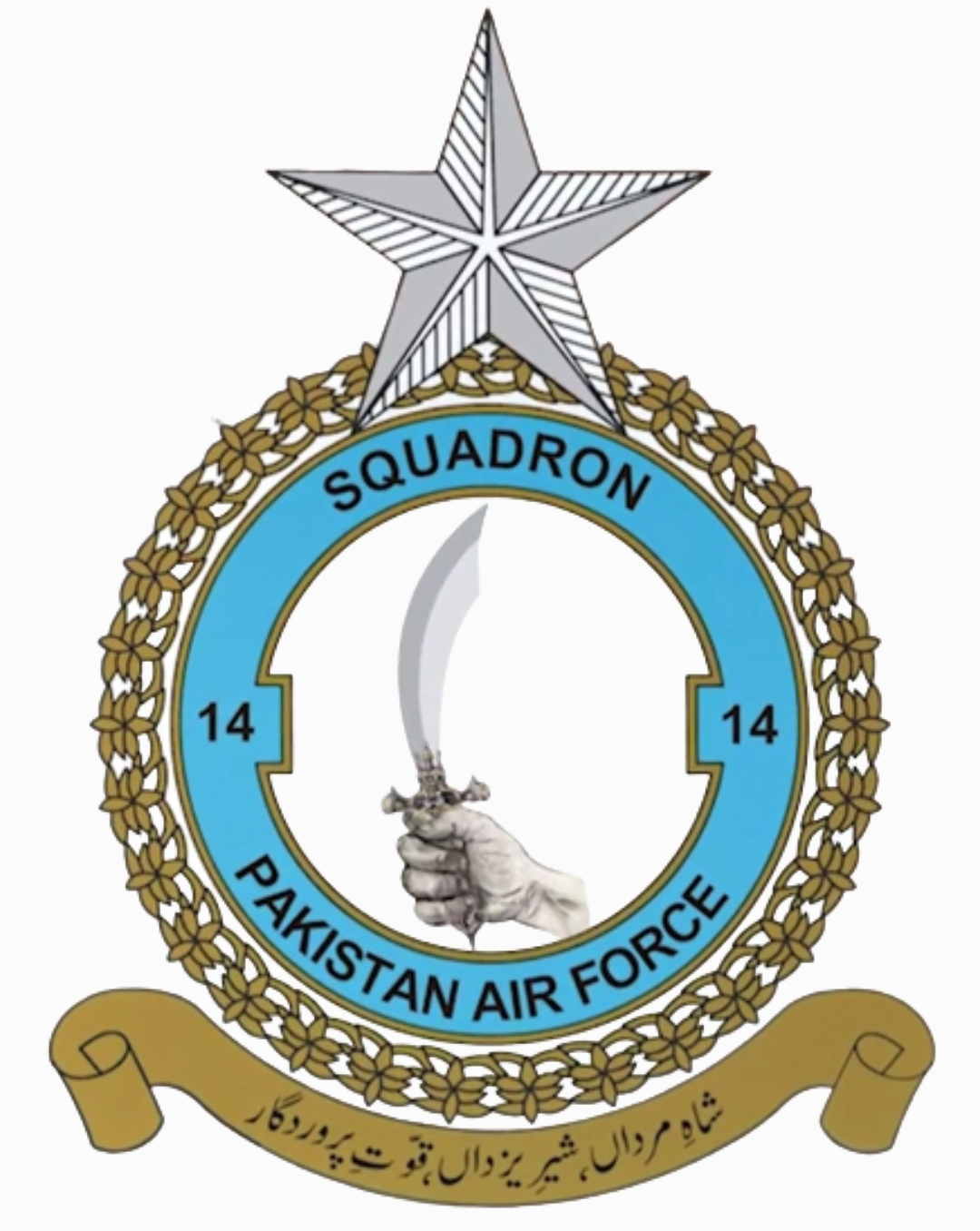
- Squadron Logo
- Active: Since 1 November 1948; 78 years ago
- Disbanded: 15 January 1949 - 16 December 1949 (Note: It was number plated for a short period)
- Country: Pakistan
- Branch: Pakistan Air Force
- Type: Fighter squadron
- Role: Multi-role
- Part of: Central Air Command
- Airbase: PAF Base Dacca (1954-71); PAF Base Rafiqui
- Nickname: Tail Choppers
- Mottos: شاهِ مَرداں شیرِ یزداں قوتِ پروردگار (Urdu for 'The king of men, the lion of Yazdan, the strength of the Lord')
- Engagements: Afghanistan-Pakistan Skirmishes; Waziristan rebellion of 1948-1954; 1949 Mughalgai raid; Spillover of Soviet - Afghan war in Pakistan; Indo-Pakistani air war of 1965; East Pakistan Air Operations; Battle of Boyra; Marka-e-Haq
- Battle honours: Kalaikunda 1965; Dhaka 1971

Commanders
- Notable commanders: Khyber Khan; Sajad Haider; Sarfaraz Ahmed Rafiqui; PQ Mehdi; Abdul Razzaq Anjum; Squadron leader Shabbir

Insignia
- Patch (Note: After introduction of JF-17)

Aircraft flown
- Fighter: Hawker Tempest; Hawker Sea Fury; F-86 Sabre; CL-13B Sabre; F-16 Fighting Falcon; JF-17 Thunder
- Interceptor: Chengdu F-7
- Trainer: Chengdu FT-7P

The No. 14 Squadron, nicknamed Tail Choppers, is an air superiority squadron of the Pakistan Air Force's Central Air Command. It is one of PAF's most decorated squadrons which earned its nickname after a daring strike mission on the Kalaikunda Air Force Station during the 1965 War. Currently, the Squadron is deployed at PAF Base Rafiqui and operates the PAC JF-17 Thunder multirole aircraft.

== History ==
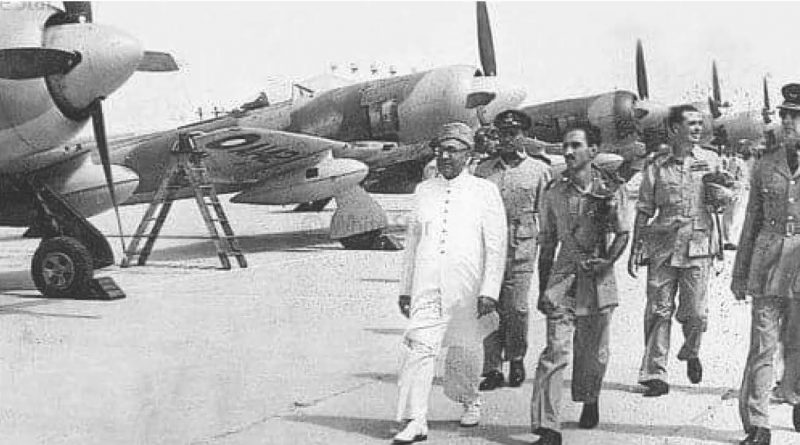
Prime Minister Liaquat Ali Khan accompanied by AVM Atcherley and Wing Commander Nur Khan during Independence Day celebrations of 1950 at Mauripur Airbase. Hawker Tempest Mk.2s of No 14 Squadron and Hawker Sea Furies of No. 5 and No 9 Squadrons are visible down the line.

The No. 14 Squadron was the PAF's first fighter-bomber squadron, which was raised on 1 November 1948, at RPAF Base Peshawar and operated the Hawker Tempest fighters which were inherited from the RIAF but were later re-equipped with newly acquired Hawker Fury fighter-bombers after being number-plated for some months.

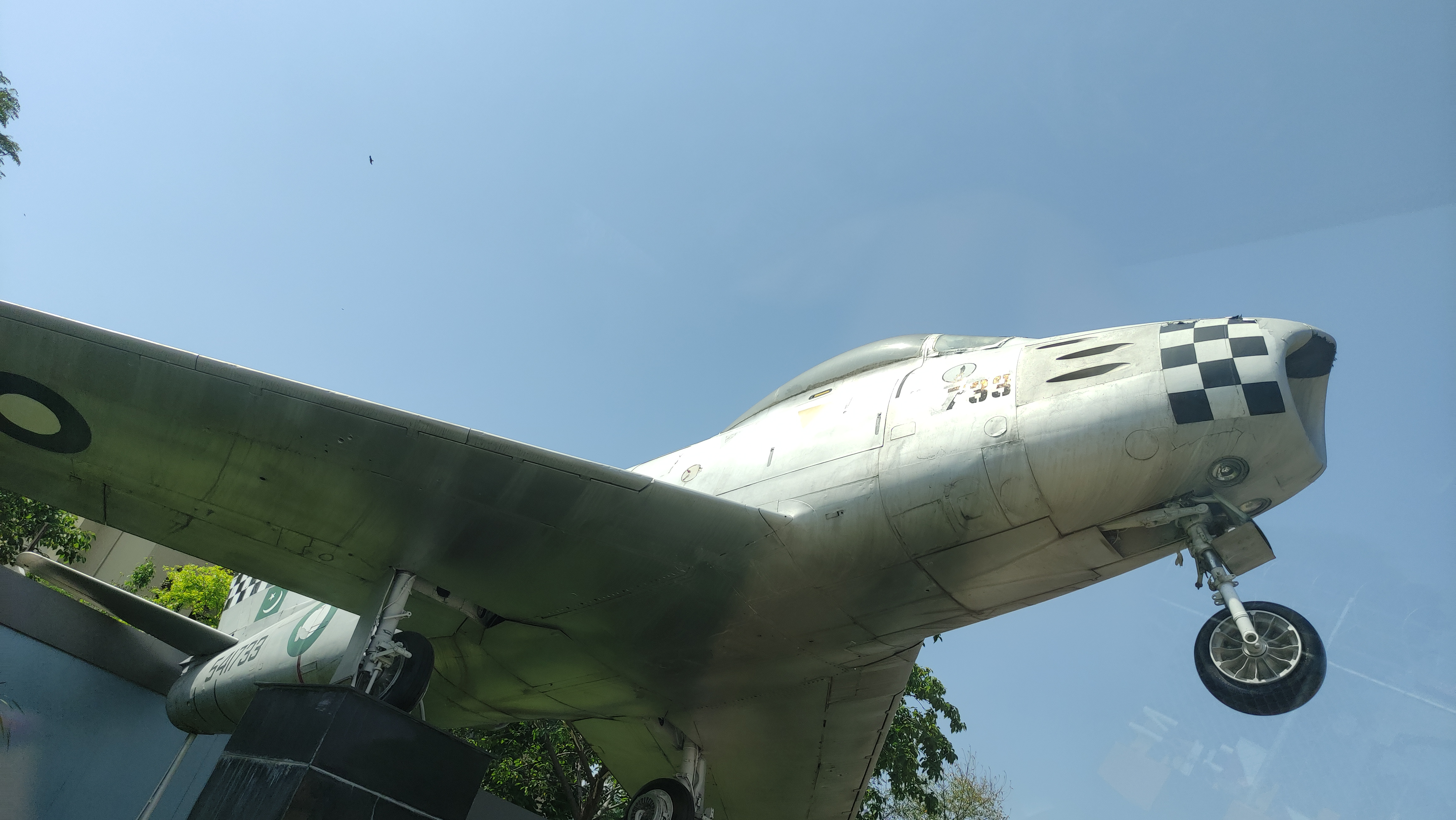
Retired Tail Chopper F-86F on display at the gates of PAF AHQ

In 1956, the squadron was transferred to PAF Base Mauripur and re-equipped with F-86 Sabres. They participated extensively in various inter-squadron competitions and exercises.

=== North Waziristan operations ===
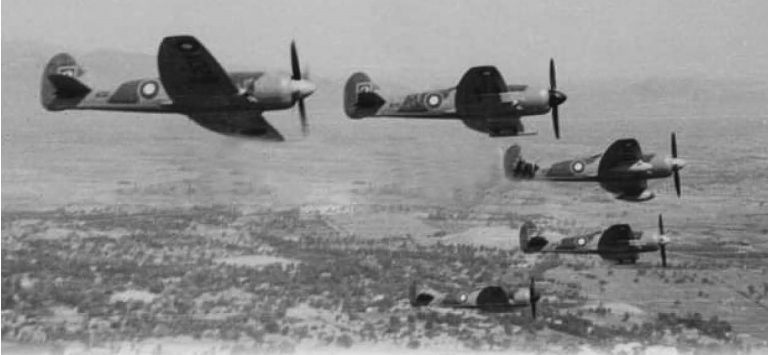
RPAF Hawker Tempest Mk.IIs flying over NWFP

After the independence of Pakistan, several armed militant groups in the North-West Frontier Province which were previously engaged in an armed conflict with the British Raj turned against Pakistan. This time backed by the Kingdom of Afghanistan, the armed groups started a rebellion against the Dominion of Pakistan. Resultantly, the No. 14 squadron was deployed at Miranshah Airfield at North Waziristan for counter insurgency operations during which it bombed several rebel targets. In 1953–54, the Squadron also launched a bombing operation on Faqir of Ipi's strongholds at Gurwek.

=== 1965 Indo-Pakistani war ===
During the 1965 war, the No. 14 Squadron was deployed at Tejgaon Air Base and initially operated 12 North American F-86F Sabres but one was lost to a bird strike on 4 September so it operated 11 units throughout the war. The Squadron didn't participate in any offensive operations during the rise in hostilities over the disputed Indian Administered Kashmir region but it had been on high alert since the Rann of Kutch conflict before the invasion. In retaliation for the Indian invasion, the PAF launched an aggressive airstrike campaign on several IAF bases.

==== Airstrikes on Kalaikunda Airbase ====
The No. 14 Squadron was ordered to launch airstrikes on the Kalaikunda Air Force Station. Thus on the morning of 7 September 1965, under the command of Squadron Leader Shabbir, the squadron's F-86 Sabres took off from Tejgaon with two 200-gallon and two 120-gallon drop tanks while armed with nothing more than 50 cal gun ammunition. The squadron's strike team eventually reached the enemy base without being intercepted by enemy fighters and started strafing the Canberra bombers and Hawker Hunter fighters parked on the tarmac. The No. 14 Squadron's pilots managed to destroy 10 out of the 14 Canberra bombers along with two other types at the IAF base after which they safely returned to base at 07:44am.

Some hours later at 10:30am, the squadron received an order to execute another airstrike on the same base to ensure the complete destruction of Kalaikunda. Thus, a formation of four Sabres under the command of Flight Lieutenant Haleem was scrambled. Due to low visibility, the formation wasn't intercepted by enemy fighters on their way but upon reaching Kalaikunda, Indian Anti-Aircraft Guns which were on alert started firing at them. As the Sabres started their airstrikes, the formation was attacked by 9 Indian Hawker Hunters. The formation then split into two groups, one of which continued the airstrikes while the other group, which consisted of Flying Officer Afzal Khan (Wingman) and Flight Lieutenant Tariq Habib (Leader), engaged the enemy Hunters. Tariq decided to jettison their fuel tanks, but Afzal was shot down before he could do so while one of Tariq's 4 fuel tanks got stuck. Despite that, he engaged 3 Indian Hunters in a 10-minute dogfight during which his Sabre got severely damaged. He eventually managed to shake off the enemy fighters and made it back to East Pakistan though his F-86 was scrapped since it was beyond repair. In the second strike on Kalaikunda, the squadron managed to destroy 4 to 8 Indian Canberra bombers.

==== Airstrikes on other IAF bases ====
On 10 September, four Sabres from the No. 14 Squadron launched an airstrike on the IAF base of Baghdogra, four days later on 14 September, the squadron struck the IAF bases of Barrakpore and Agartala but since the IAF had retreated most of its aircraft from the eastern frontline, the squadron destroyed few aircraft in these strikes which included one Canberra, two fighters, five transport aircraft, and one helicopter.

=== Pakistani civil conflict and subsequent Indo-Pakistani war of 1971 ===
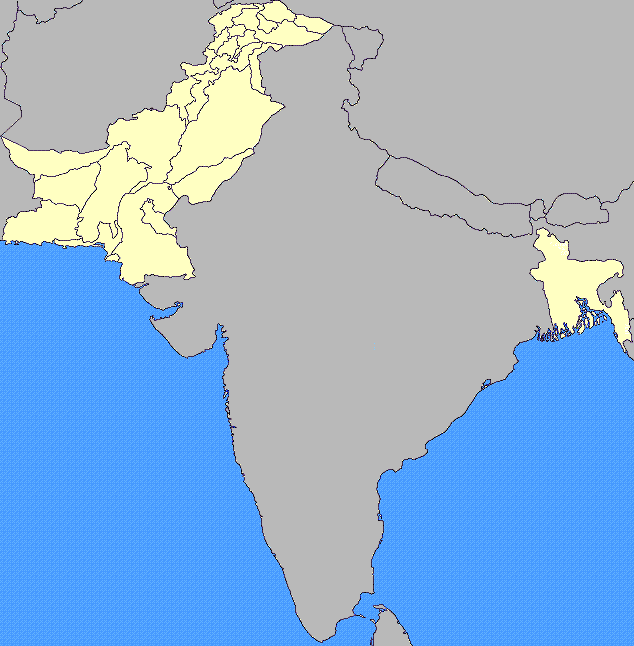
The map shows Pakistan and East Pakistan; between them was 1,600 km (1,000 mi) of Indian territory.

The No. 14 squadron carried out numerous CAS missions all around then East Pakistan during the civil uprising in 1971. After India intervened in the Conflict, the Squadron was the sole squadron of Pakistan defending East Pakistani airspace from the numerically superior Indian forces. It fought until the final days of the war until subsequently the Dhaka Airbase was destroyed by Indian Bombers and overrun by the invading Indian forces alongside Bengali rebels. By the end of the war, the squadron along with the Dhaka Airbase's ack-ack guns had destroyed 23 IAF warplanes. According to the neutral sources, India flew 1,978 sorties in the East and about 4,000 in West Pakistan, while the PAF flew about 30 and 2,840 at the respective fronts. By the end of the war, India had overall lost 45 aircraft while Pakistan lost 75.

At the end of the war with the surrender of Pakistani forces to the Indian forces, PAF pilots made successful escapes from East Pakistan to neighbouring Burma; many PAF personnel had already left the East for Burma on their own before Dacca was overrun by the Indian military in December 1971.

=== Aerial Engagements with Soviet & Afghan Jets ===
During the Soviet-Afghan war, Soviet and Afghan jets would bomb Afghan refugee camps and Mujahideen camps in the then North West Frontier Province (presently Khyber Pakhtunkhwa). Resultantly, the No. 14 Squadron, while operating the F-16 Fighting Falcon, was deployed at PAF Base Minhas at Kamra from where they carried out Combat Air Patrol missions on the Western Borders where they would eventually dogfight with Soviet and Afghan jets.

On 16 April 1987, Squadron Leader Badar Islam from the Tail Choppers shot down an Afghan Su-22 with an AIM-9L Sidewinder. On 4 August 1987, Squadron Leader Athar Bukhari shot down a Soviet Su-25 near Miranshah, the Soviet pilot, Colonel Alexander Rutskoy, safely ejected and was arrested by Pakistani authorities. He was later handed back to the Soviets on 16 August 1988. Later, on 12 September 1988, Flight Lieutenant Khalid shot down two Mig-23. The squadron scored its last kill on 3 November 1988, when Flight Lieutenant Khalid Mehmood shot down an Afghan Su-22.

=== War on Terror ===
During Operation Black Thunderstorm, an F-7P of the Tail Choppers performed a Sonic boom over the Peochar valley before Pakistani forces were inserted into the area. This was to create fear amongst the militants occupying the area.

=== Operation Bunyan-Um-Marsoos ===
According to claims circulated by Pakistani sources, on the early morning of 10th May a JF-17 Thunder, reportedly flown by Wing Cdr Hammad Ibn-e-Masood, carried out what was described as a Destruction of Enemy Air Defence (DEAD) mission against the S-400 system at Adampur Air Force Station. It was claimed that the aircraft used electronic countermeasures, decoys, and evasive manoeuvres to approach the Indo-Pak border and launched a CM-400AKG high-supersonic air-launched missile. As per these accounts, the missile allegedly followed an inertial navigation system with satellite correction using GPS and BeiDou during its mid-course phase, which was described as passive in nature.

The claim further states that, in the terminal phase, a passive seeker was activated to detect radar emissions, allowing the missile to home in on the target. It was also alleged that the radar operators received no prior warning and that shutting down the radar at that stage would not have prevented impact. According to these unverified reports, the missile executed a steep terminal dive at hypersonic speed. Pakistan has claimed that this strike successfully destroyed the 96L6E “Cheese Board” radar of the S-400 air defence system at Adampur Air Force Station; however, no independent confirmation or supporting evidence has been provided to substantiate this claim. [26] [27] [28]

== Aircraft flown ==
No. 14 Squadron Tail Choppers
Role	Operational	Aircraft	Notes
Fighter-Bomber	1948-Unknown	Hawker Tempest	Inherited several Ex-RIAF units upon Pakistan's Independence from the British Raj.
Fighter Aircraft	1948–1956	Hawker Fury	
Fighter	1956–1971	F-86	Operated 12 F-86F variants until 1965.
Fighter	1966–1971	Canadair Sabre	Operated Ex-Luftwaffe Mk.6 variants which were bought via Iran.
Air Superiority	1972–1986	Shenyang F-6/FT-6	The FT-6 trainer variants were inducted in 1977.
Multi-role	1986–1993	F-16 Fighting Falcon	
Fighter	1993–2017	Chengdu F-7P	
Multi-role	2017–Present	JF-17 Thunder	

== See also ==
- List of Pakistan Air Force squadrons
- No. 9 Squadron (Pakistan Air Force)
- No. 16 Squadron (Pakistan Air Force)
- No. 26 Squadron (Pakistan Air Force)
