= Pervaiz Mehdi Qureshi =

Retired Air Chief Marshal, Pakistan Air Force

Pervaiz Mehdi Qureshi NI(M) HI(M) SI(M) SBt
- پرویز مهدی قریشی
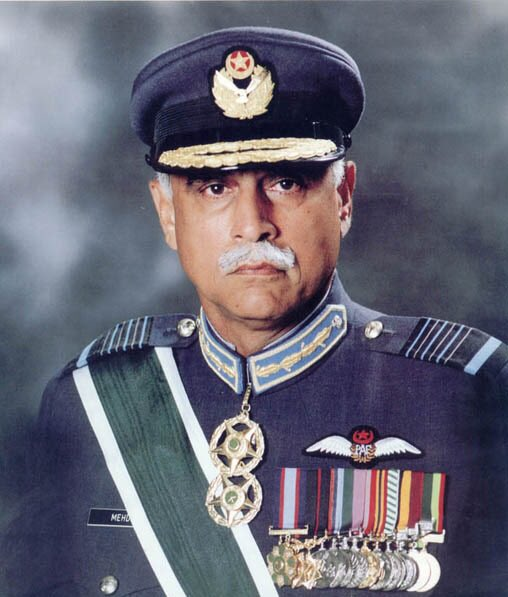

8th Chief of Air Staff
- In office 7 November 1997 – 20 November 2000
- Preceded by: Abbas Khattak
- Succeeded by: Mushaf Ali Mir

Vice Chief of Air Staff
- In office May 1997 – 6 November 1997

Personal details
- Born: 1 October 1943 (age 83) Phalia, Punjab Province (British India)
- Nickname: PQ Mehdi

Military service
- Allegiance: Pakistan
- Branch/service: Pakistan Air Force
- Years of service: 1961–2000
- Rank: Air Chief Marshal
- Unit: No. 14 Squadron PAF; No. 16 Squadron PAF
- Commands: Pakistan Air Force; Vice Chief of Air Staff; DCAS (Operations); AOC Southern Air Command; AOC Northern Air Command; Air Defence Command
- Battles/wars: Indo-Pakistani War of 1965; Air War operations; Bangladesh Liberation War; Indo-Pakistani War of 1971; East-Pakistan air operations; Kargil War
- Awards: See list Sword of Honour (1964)

Parvaiz Mehdi Qureshi (Note: Urdu: پرویز مهدی قریشی) (born 1 October 1943) best known as PQ Mehdi, is a retired four-star air officer and former fighter pilot who served as the eighth Chief of Air Staff (CAS) of the Pakistan Air Force from 1997 until his retirement in 2000.

His tenure in command of the Pakistan Air Force is notable for the events involving the short-lived military conflict with the Indian Army in Kargil in 1999. He is credited with advising Prime Minister Nawaz Sharif against all-out war with India, eventually providing an exit for the Pakistan Army to deescalate the situation through diplomacy with India.

== Early life ==
Parvaiz Mehdi Qureshi was born in Phalia, Punjab, into a Punjabi family on 1 October 1943.

== Military career ==
After graduating from Govt Pilot Secondary School Phalia, Mehdi joined the Pakistan Air Force in 1961, and shared a room with subsequent army chief General Musharraf and future Pakistan Navy chief Aziz Mirza, who became his lifelong friends.

After their interview with the local commandants, Mehdi, Musharraf, and Mirza went to see the acclaimed Urdu movie Savera (lit. Dawn). The next day, all three were notified to report back to their respective academies for training. Mehdi enrolled in the PAF Academy in Risalpur, Khyber-Pakhtunkhwa, and passed out in the class of the 38th GD Pilot course, where he was also conferred with the Sword of Honour by the Commandant of the academy in 1964.

After being commissioned and assigned to No. 16 Squadron Black Panthers as a pilot officer, he qualified as a fighter pilot, flying the F-86 Sabre jet.

=== Wars with India ===
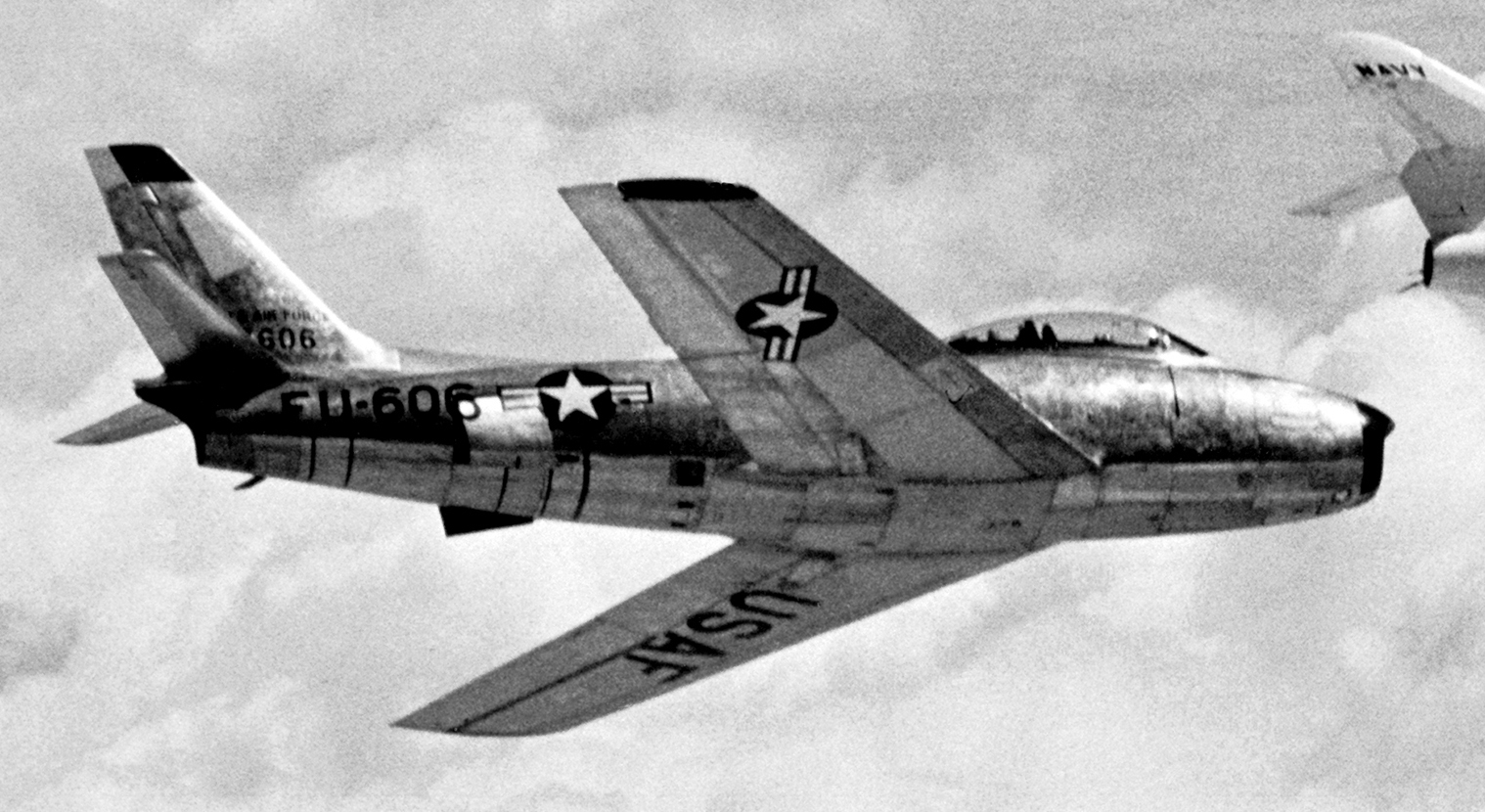
F-86 in flight: Flight Lieutenant Mehdi was shot down by an Indian Folland Gnat while flying a F-86 in 1971.

In 1965, Pilot Officer Mehdi participated in close air support combat operations during the Indo-Pakistani war of 1965, where he flew his Sabre against Indian Folland Gnats. After the war, Mehdi was promoted to flying officer in 1966 and flight-lieutenant in 1969.

In 1969, Flight-Lieutenant Mehdi was then dispatched to serve at the Dacca airbase of the Pakistan Air Force in East Pakistan, serving in No. 14 Squadron Tail choppers. In 1970, Mehdi took over the command of a flight of the squadron, stationed at Dacca airbase. In 1971, Mehdi participated in the air operations in East Pakistan against the Indian Army and the Revolutionary group it supported, Mukti Bahini.

On 22 November 1971, Mehdi flew a combat mission in his F-86 Sabre in support of operation in Garibpur against the Indian Air Force. He was flying with a finger-four formation of the ground attack/bomber unit near the town of Garibpur, when his F-86 Sabre was shot down by a Folland Gnat piloted by Fg Off Donald Lazarus of 22 Squadron IAF. His wingman, F/Off Khalil Ahmad also suffered a similar fate, and was captured by Indian troops. Flight Lieutenant Mehdi parachuted down to 50 yards behind the Chaugachha Upazila, where he was captured by Indian Army soldiers; he was physically attacked by the Bengali soldiers before being rescued by Captain H. S. Panag, the Indian Army section commander. He was the first Pakistani prisoner of war of the conflict and was eventually sent to Fort Williams. His capture made the front pages of the Indian newspapers, and the photos of his capture were widely aired on the television screens by the Pakistani news media. Upon watching the news, President Yahya Khan imposed the state of emergency and ordered the military for the preparation of war with India on 23 November 1971.

According to East Pakistani sources, No. 14 Squadron Tail choppers suffered minor casualties due to a lack of effective radars that could have provided them with an early warning, whereas the attacking Indian Air Force planes were directed by Indian radar controllers at Barrackpore.

=== Repatriation and command appointments ===
The Delhi Agreement, signed by the Governments of India, Pakistan, and Bangladesh, made it possible for POWs to be repatriated to Pakistan from India in 1973–75. Upon his return, Mehdi was directed to attend the war course at the Air War College, where he earned a master's degree in War studies in 1976. In 1977, Squadron-Leader, Mehdi served to join the faculty of the Combat Commanders School (CCS), a TOPGUN training school, which he remained associated with several years.

From 1977 to 1979, Wing-Commander Mehdi served as the commanding officer of No. 9 Squadron Griffins, stationed at Sargodha Air Force Base (AFB). In 1981–83, Group-Captain Mehdi was appointed as the base commander of Sargodha AFB. During this time, Mehdi qualified as a combat pilot to fly the F-16s.

In 1991–93, Air-Commodore Mehdi was appointed air officer commanding of the Southern Air Command, based in Sindh, Pakistan, and was promoted to two-star rank, and transferred to command the Northern Air Command. In 1993, AVM Mehdi took over the command of the Air Defence Command, then-based in the Chaklala AFB. In 1995, Mehdi was promoted to the three-star rank, posted to the Air Headquarters (AHQ) in Islamabad as Deputy Chief of the Air Staff (Operations). He remained in this capacity until 1997.

In 1997, Air-Marshal Mehdi was elevated and appointed as the Vice Chief of Air Staff (VCAS) under then-Chief of Air Staff Air Chief Marshal Abbas Khattak.

=== Chief of Air Staff ===
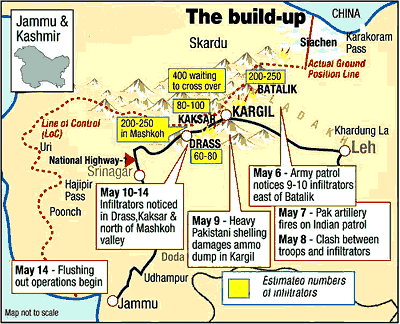
Contingency plan of Kargil in 1999.

On 7 November 1997, Prime Minister Nawaz Sharif approved the promotion of Mehdi to four-star rank, air chief marshal, and Medhi subsequently took over command of the Pakistan Air Force as its Chief of Air Staff (CAS) on 8 November 1997. As air chief, Mehdi played a crucial role in expanding the educational scope of the Air War College in Karachi, and backed up the military's plan for enhancing communications capabilities between the branches of the Pakistani military.

In 1998, Mehdi supported authorizing the nuclear weapon testing during a national security meeting with the civilian cabinet. Gen. Mehdi issued directives to the F-16s belonging to No. 11 Squadron Arrows to escort the C-130H strategically airlifting six-to-seven nuclear device to the weapon-testing sites in Balochistan, Pakistan. Mehdi did not comment or offer any opinion when Prime Minister Sharif relieved the military commission of then-Chairman Joint chiefs General Jehangir Karamat in 1998.

=== Kargil conflict ===
Mehdi commanded the Pakistan Air Force during a two-month long military confrontation with the Indian Army in 1999. Meeting with the chairman of the joint chiefs, Mehdi advised against involving the Air Force, stating:

(sic)...any intervention by the Pakistan Air Force into disputed land of Indian Kashmir would be perceived as an escalation to all-out declared war." Despite the strong urging of the JS HQ, the AHQ issued orders to their commanders to restrict the war efforts, knowing that "cross-border attacks either on the side of the LoC or the international border would invite an immediate response from the Indian Air Force, possibly in the shape of a retaliatory strike against the home base of the intruding fighters–thus starting the first round.

Furthermore, the aerial embargo placed by the United States in 1989–91 had badly affected the operational capabilities of the air force to carry out day-and-night combat missions. After much discussions, the F-16s were deployed but within the country's airspace and did not take part in the war. After the Indian Air Force initiated Operation Safed Sagar in support of the Indian Army, F-16s from the Northern Air Command were deployed for combat air patrol to protect Skardu Air Force Base against any Indian Air Force incursion.

In several meetings, Mehdi objected General Musharraf's grand strategy, pointing out the aftermath of Chengiz Khan, a successful mission of PAF that, however, led the start of the Indo-Pakistani War of 1971. Therefore, Mehdi objected to any direct confrontation but favoured the patrolling missions and remaining silent in support of other officers who gave vital criticism of Musharraf.

=== Retirement ===
In military and political circles, Mehdi's image was widely known to have an imposing personality, and a direct but strict attitude towards his principles. His retirement was eventually confirmed when a junior-most air force general was promoted succeed him, leading to speculations that "PQ Mehdi's rather straight-faced and forthright dealings with a somewhat junior-general Pervez Musharraf (although both graduated with same class) particularly during Kargil conflict was a good reason to believe that the general decided to appoint a not-very-senior air chief marshal whom he could order around like one of his Corps Commanders."

Therefore, General Musharraf favoured superseding five senior air force generals and appointed a sixth-in-line to the four-star rank once Mehdi was due for retirement.

== Awards and decorations ==
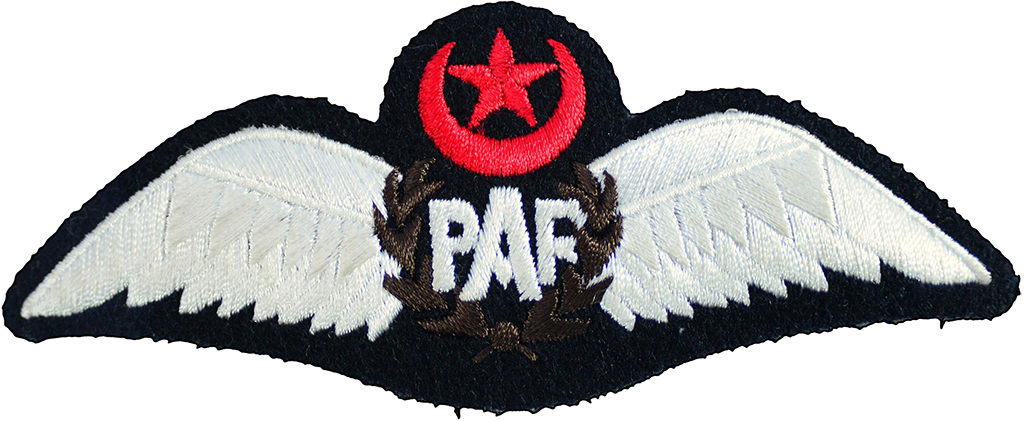

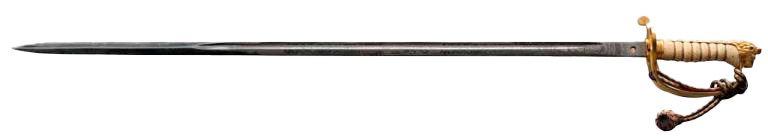

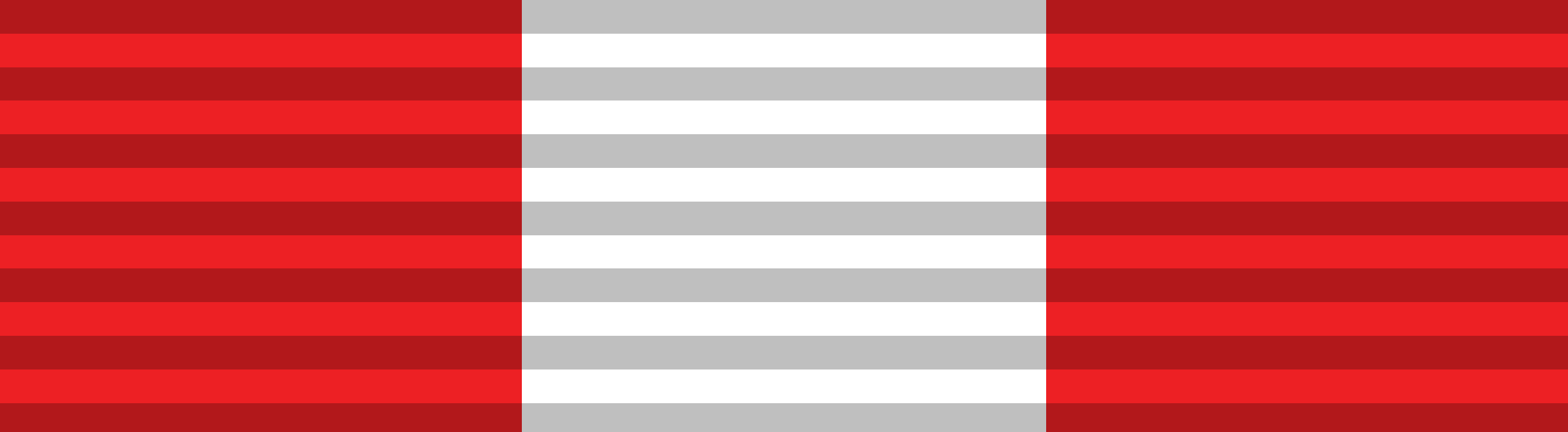

PAF GD(P) Badge RED (More than 3000 Flying Hours)
Sword of Honour; PAF Academy; 1964
Nishan-e-Imtiaz (Military) (Order of Excellence)		Hilal-i-Imtiaz (Military) (Crescent of Excellence)	
Sitara-i-Imtiaz (Military) (Star of Excellence)	Sitara-e-Basalat (Star of Valour)	Sitara-e-Harb 1965 War (War Star 1965)	Sitara-e-Harb 1971 War (War Star 1971)
Tamgha-e-Jang 1965 War (War Medal 1965)	Tamgha-e-Jang 1971 War (War Medal 1971)	Tamgha-e-Baqa (Nuclear Test Medal) 1998	10 Years Service Medal
20 Years Service Medal	30 Years Service Medal	Tamgha-e-Sad Saala Jashan-e-Wiladat-e-Quaid-e-Azam (100th Birth Anniversary of Muhammad Ali Jinnah) 1976	Hijri Tamgha (Hijri Medal) 1979
Tamgha-e-Jamhuriat (Democracy Medal) 1988	Qarardad-e-Pakistan Tamgha (Resolution Day Golden Jubilee Medal) 1990	Tamgha-e-Salgirah Pakistan (Independence Day Golden Jubilee Medal) 1997	Turkish Legion of Merit (Turkey)

=== Foreign decorations ===
Foreign Awards
Turkey	Turkish Legion of Merit

== Notes ==
Military offices
Preceded by Abbas Khattak	Chief of Air Staff; 1997–2000	Succeeded by Mushaf Ali Mir
