= No. 22 Squadron IAF =

No. 22 Squadron
- Crest of No 22 Squadron
- Active: 15 October 1966 – 29 December 2017
- Country: India
- Role: CAS; Interdiction; Ground attack
- Garrison/HQ: Hasimara AFS
- Nickname: "Swifts"
- Mottos: Sahase Vijayate; Courage Triumphs

Insignia
- Identification symbol: Flying Swift

Aircraft flown
- Attack: Mig 27ML

No. 22 Squadron (Swifts) was a CAS unit based out of Hasimara AFS. Along with No. 222 Squadron IAF Tiger Sharks, No. 22 Squadron forms a part of the 16 Wing of the IAF. The squadron operated the MiG-27 till December 2017 and the squadron number-plated since then.

== Formation ==
No. 22 Sqn, IAF was raised on 15 October 1966 at Airforce Station Bareilly under the command of Wg Cdr PP Singh as a part of Eastern Air Command, and named "Hell's Angels". The unit was at the time equipped with Gnat Mk-I ac and assigned to Ground attack and Air defence. It moved to Kalaikunda AFB under Eastern Air Command in September 1968, forming a part of the 5 Wing.

== 1971 Operations ==
=== Air defence ===
On 22 November 1971, the squadron fought the first engagement that signified the opening of all out war in 1971, four Gnats operating from Dum Dum, engaged Sabres over Boyra salient, shot down two of them, and badly damaged one. The damaged aircraft however made it back to Tezgaon Airfield alongside the undamaged one. Two of the PAF pilots, namely Pervez Mehdi Qureshi, Khaleel Ahmed, ejected over the Boyra salient, and were taken POWs.

=== Ground attack ===
No. 22 did not fly against ground targets until three days after the formal declaration of war. First of these was on 6 December, against Barisal Airfield, south of Dhaka. At 1200 hours, four Gnats flew against the airfield at Brisal, destroying all the hangars, and causing extensive damage to the bunkers around it.

The squadron also struck the Ishurdi airfield repeatedly between 5 and 8 December, and Jessore on 8 December. On 7 Dec, the squadron destroyed the Army Brigade at Khulna.

=== Close air support ===
The most extensive ground support missions were flown against the Pakistani Army positions in Jessore. The Indian Army faced its most difficult task in the capture of Jessore, where the Pakistani Army had dug-in in concrete defences and defended every inch and were also aided by an effective artillery barrage. No 22 Sqn would strike these positions with Unguided bombs, destroying the defences in pinpoint attacks. Jessore would fall after this bloody confrontation.

=== Bomber and transport escort ===
No. 22 provided crucial fighter escort to the Hunters and Canberras on strikes against positions deep inside East Pakistan. The Pakistani Air Force did not attempt to intercept these flights, and hence allowed these bombers to go through unhampered, causing extensive damage to railyards and strongholds. Gnats from No 22 would also provide fighter escort to the An-12s and Dakotas during the Tangail Airdrop on 11 December 1971.

=== Anti shipping operations ===
The Pakistani ground forces attempted to retreat through small boats, motor launches and barges. The squadron carried out raids on Khulna, Banisol, and Godanad between 7 and 15 December, effectively stopping the escape.

== Post-War ==
In December 1975, the squadron moved to Hasimara, and in April 1978, it moved to Bagdogra and converted to HAL Ajeet Mk.1 aircraft in March 1982. On 20 December 1985, the unit was awarded the present crest of the Swift by the then President R. Venkataraman, and renamed to its current name. In February 1990, the squadron moved back to Hasimara, and converted to Mikoyan MiG-27ML aircraft.

== Sabre Slayers ==
The Squadron earned its name of Sabre Slayers, during Operations in December 1971. In the Battle of Boyra of the war, three intruding Sabres of the PAF were shot down by the Squadron Pilots. Through the war, Gnats from No.22 repeatedly engaged the PAF Sabres with devastating effect.

== Aircraft ==
Aircraft types operated by the squadron

Aircraft type	From	To	Air base
Folland Gnat I	15 October 1966	December 1969	AFS Bareilly
Folland Gnat I	December 1969	April 1982	AFS Kalaikunda
Hawker Hunter	February 1973	February 1986	
HAL Ajeet	March 1982	March 1990	
MiG-23 UB	February 1990	29 December 2017	AFS Hasimara
MiG-27	February 1990	29 December 2017	AFS Hasimara

== Awards ==
1. Flt Lt RA Massey F(P) Vr C- 1971 operations
2. Flt Lt M. A. Ganapathy F(P) Vr C - 1971 operations
3. Flt Lt D Lazarus F(P) Vr C - 1971 Operations
