= Abdullah Qureshi (activist) =

Pakistani activist

Abdullah Qureshhi (1935 – 9 December 2007) was an activist in the Labour Party of Pakistan who was killed in a suicide bomb attack in the Swat Valley.

== Life ==
He founded "Swat Rorwali" in the 1950s. He was exiled to Gojaranwala, Punjab in the 1960s.
