= No. 20 Squadron IAF =

No. 20 Squadron Lightnings
- Insignia of The No. 20 Squadron IAF "Lightnings"
- Active: 1 June 1956 - Present
- Country: Republic of India
- Allegiance: Indian Armed Forces
- Branch: Indian Air Force
- Role: Fighter
- Garrison/HQ: Lohegaon Air Force Station
- Nickname: "Lightnings"
- Mottos: Vegvankutobhayah; Swift and Fearless
- Engagements: Indo-Pakistani War of 1965; Indo-Pakistani War of 1971; Battle of Chumb

Aircraft flown
- Attack: Sukhoi Su-30MKI

No. 20 Squadron nicknamed as Lightnings is a fighter squadron. It is equipped with Sukhoi Su-30MKI and based at Lohegaon Air Force Station, Pune.

== History ==
The Lightnings stuck with tremendous impact during the December 1971 operations. A decade later, No. 20 Squadron were chosen to form the IAF's formation aerobatic team given the appellation of "Thunderbolts".

The IAF's most decorated squadron, No.20 Lightnings, was re-commissioned from its number plated status to operational status. Its pilots and crews were mainly drawn from the first Sukhoi squadron, No. 24 Squadron IAF 'Hunting Hawks,' and have considerable experience on the type. This squadron is considered one of the parent squadrons of the Sukhoi 30 MKI in the IAF. Also the No.20 Squadron played an important role in making the Flankers fully operational in the Indian Air Force.

== Aircraft ==
Aircraft types operated by the squadron

Aircraft type	From	To	Air base
de Havilland Vampire FB52	1 June 1956	May 1959	AFS Halwara
Hawker Hunter Mk 56	May 1959	1965	AFS Palam
Hawker Hunter Mk 56	1965	February 1968	AFS Hindon
Hawker Hunter Mk 56A	February 1968	July 1996	AFS Pathankot
Mig-21 FL	March 1996	1975	AFS Pathankot
Mig-21 FL	1975	January 1998	
Mig-21 Bison	August 2004	May 2005	
Sukhoi Su-30 MKI	January 2002	Present	AFS Lohegaon
