= Battle of Garibpur =

Battle of the Bangladesh Liberation War (1971)

- Part of Bangladesh Liberation War and Indo-Pakistani War of 1971
| Date | 20–21 November 1971 (1 day) |
| Location | Garibpur, Khulna, East Pakistan |
| Result | Indian-Bangladeshi victory |

Belligerents
| Bangladesh: Mukti Bahini; India (20 November – 21 November 1971): Indian Army | Pakistan: Pakistan Army |

Commanders and leaders
| Colonel DS Jamwal (Regiment Commanding Officer 1971-73); Colonel TS Sidhu; Lieutenant Colonel (later Brigadier) R K Singh, MVC, CO 14 Punjab; Major Daljit "Chiefy" Singh Narang †, MVC, CO C Squadron, 45 Cavalry; Captain (later Brigadier) Balram Singh Mehta, 2nd In Command, C Squadron, 45 Cav; Captain (later Colonel) Khondkar Nazmul Huda, BB, Sub-sector commander (Boyra), Sector-VIII | Brigadier Mohammad Hayat |

Units involved
| C Squadron, 45 Cavalry; 14th Battalion, Punjab Regiment | 107th Infantry Brigade: 6th Battalion, Punjab Regiment; 21st Battalion, Punjab Regiment; 22nd Battalion, Frontier Force; 3rd (Independent) Armoured Squadron |

Strength
| 14 PT-76 amphibious tanks ~900–1,200 light infantry | 14 M24 Chaffee light tanks 2–4 105mm Recoilless Rifles; ~2,700–3,600 light infantry |

Casualties and losses
| 2 tanks destroyed, according to Brig. B.S Mehta; 4 tanks destroyed, according to Col. V.Y. Gidh; 70 casualties (28 KIA, 42 WIA) | 6 tanks destroyed 4 tanks damaged 3 tanks captured 300 infantry killed/wounded |

The Battle of Garibpur was fought between the Indian forces and Pakistani forces for the control of the village of Garibpur, now in Bangladesh. On 20 November 1971, Indian troops of the 14th Battalion of the Punjab Regiment with 14 supporting PT-76 tanks from the 45 Cavalry moved in to capture the areas around Garibpur in Pakistani territory. The battle started by Pakistani troops counterattacking the next day to recapture Garibpur.

== Background ==
After months of internal tensions in East Pakistan (now Bangladesh) and a clampdown on Bengali nationalists, the independence forces had coalesced into the combined Mukti Bahini. After initial success by Pakistani troops against the Mukti Bahini, there had been some relative calm in the region, and further Indian assistance was sought to turn the tide. India thus started to involve itself deeper into the conflict brewing in the east and stationed its troops near the border.

The Boyra salient, in north-western East Pakistan, consisted of Garibpur and was at an important crossroads for both nations. Its control was thus vital, as it gave the Indian Army a highway to Jessore from India.

== Capture of Garibpur ==
Lieutenant Colonel RK Singh (CO 14 Punjab) had been given the objective of crossing the river west of Garibpur; securing the village; and cutting off the Pakistani 107th Infantry Brigade, which was in the village of Chaugacha, north of Garibpur, from supplies coming from Jessore. Assisting him would be the 102nd Engineer Regiment and "C" Squadron, 45 Cavalry under Major Daljit "Chiefy" Singh Narang. The deadline given to Singh for the objective was 21 November.

However, Garibpur and its surroundings were so lightly defended that the Indian units had captured the town by 20 November with no resistance. That morning, despite the success of the larger force, a routine Pakistani patrol bumped into an Indian advance patrol, which gave the Pakistani positions at Chaugacha warning of the Indian attack. Pakistani intelligence, as a Pakistani prisoner-of-war would reveal after the battle, informed the 107th that the Garibpur bridgehead was held by an understrength battalion of light infantry, which could be easily defeated. As such, the 107th began to formulate a counterattack, which would materialise against Indian positions on the morning of the 21st.

== Battle ==
Risaldar R.P. Singh of C Squadron, along with a small section of dismounted infantry, was on patrol north of the Indian positions at Garibpur just after midnight. Around 0200 hours, he radioed Captain B.S. Mehta of C Squadron of the advancing Pakistani armour and infantry. After Singh had confirmed the number of vehicles and the direction of approach, Major Daljit "Chiefy" Singh Narang, left behind the infantry of 14 Punjab and some recoilless rifles in a defensive position, and ordered his squadron forward into a horseshoe formation to ambush the Pakistani column.

The attack commenced in the early hours of 21 November, with the Pakistani 3rd Independent Armoured Squadron providing covering fire for the infantry attack by 6 and 21 Punjab. The attack was, however, hampered by the fact that India had had time to prepare defenses against the Pakistani infantry and had time to lay an ambush against Pakistani armour. Early in the fighting, Major Narang was killed and the squadron's second-in-command, Captain B.S. Mehta, assumed command for most of the battle. Despite fog reducing the visibility for tank crews on both sides, the Indian PT-76 crews outmaneuvered and outgunned the Pakistani M24s, with the PT-76s destroying 6, damaging 4 beyond repair and capturing 3. Delta Company and Charlie Company of 14 Punjab had set up at the flanks of the Pakistani axis of assault with HMGs and MMGs, and Alpha and Bravo Companies had set up in the center. The Pakistani infantry advance was similarly halted.

In contrast to the Pakistani 3rd (Independent) Armoured Squadron, which was completely destroyed, "C" Squadron suffered only 2 tanks damaged when Major Narang was killed by enemy tank fire and when Captain Mehta's tank was damaged by a recoilless rifle. There are no concrete numbers for infantry casualties on the Pakistani side, but Colonel Gidh estimates 300 casualties, including dead and wounded. The Indians suffered 28 killed and 42 wounded.

=== Battle of Boyra ===
The Pakistani Army had called for help from the Pakistan Air Force, which soon responded with attacks on Indian positions. At around 1500 hours, Sabres from the PAF's No. 14 Squadron flew in to provide close air support and hit the Indian positions by using machine guns and rocket fire.

The Indian Air Force, however, had prepared for such an attack and so mobilised four Folland Gnats to intercept. Two Sabres were shot down, and another was damaged after a brief dogfight. The damaged F-86 Sabre managed to fly back home safely. Two of the pilots ejected safely but were captured by the Mukti Bahini and Indian troops and were taken to India as prisoners-of-war.

== Aftermath ==
The battle came just weeks before the official start of the war and had an unexpected turn of events. Victory in that battle and others like the Battle of Hilli ensured that the north of East Pakistan was virtually in the hands of Mitro Bahini, an alliance of the Indian Army and the Mukti Bahini, before war had been declared.
