= Javed Kureishi =

Personal information
- Full name: Javed Kureishi
- Born: 25 August 1961 (age 65); Karachi, Pakistan
- Role: All-rounder
- Relatives: Omar Kureishi (father)

Domestic team information
- Years: Team
- 1977/78–1979/80: Pakistan International Airlines
- 1979/80: Sindh
- 1979/80: Pakistan International Airlines B

Career statistics
Competition	First-class
Matches	8
Runs scored	72
Batting average	10.28
100s/50s	0/0
Top score	14
Balls bowled	873
Wickets	14
Bowling average	31.07
5 wickets in innings	1
10 wickets in match	0
Best bowling	5/39
Catches/stumpings	3/–
- Source: Cricinfo, 3 May 2026

Javed Kureishi (born 25 August 1961) is a Pakistani banker and former cricketer. An all-rounder, he captained the Pakistan Under-19s on their tours of Sri Lanka and India in 1978–79 and played first-class cricket for Pakistan International Airlines, Sindh and Pakistan International Airlines B.

Kureishi has served as the chief executive officer of the Pakistan Business Council since July 2025.

== Early life and education ==
Kureishi was born on 25 August 1961. His father, Omar Kureishi, was a Pakistani cricket commentator and writer. He studied at the University of Sussex, from which he holds a BA (Hons).

== Career ==
Kureishi captained Pakistan Under-19s during the side's 1978–79 tour of Sri Lanka and India. The tour included five Youth Tests against India Under-19s, all of which were drawn; Kureishi captained Pakistan in the series and appeared in the fifth Youth Test at Lucknow in February 1979. In the second Youth Test at Chennai, he scored 12 and bowled in both India innings as Pakistan drew the match.

At senior level, Kureishi played eight first-class matches between 1977–78 and 1979–80. He scored 72 runs at a batting average of 10.28, with a highest score of 14, and took 14 wickets at a bowling average of 31.07. He did not score a first-class century or half-century, but took one five-wicket haul, with best bowling figures of 5 for 39. Later, he also represented Sussex Under-25 while studying in the United Kingdom.

After his cricket career, Kureishi became a banker. He worked for Citibank in senior positions across Asia Pacific, the Czech Republic, Egypt, Africa, the Middle East, and Pakistan.

In November 2020, Kureishi was appointed as an independent member of the Pakistan Cricket Board Board of Governors for a three-year term. The following day, he was named to the PCB Commercial Affairs Committee and the Pakistan Super League Governing Council.

In July 2025, the Pakistan Business Council appointed Kureishi as its chief executive officer, effective 11 July 2025. As chief executive of the council, he serves on the boards of K-Electric, Fauji Foods, and KE Venture. He has also held directorships at the Pakistan Stock Exchange, Naya Nazimabad, Samba Bank, and has served as a consultant to IFC Pakistan.

== Personal life ==
Kureishi is married and has two children.
