= Lok Bhavan, Maharashtra =

Lok Bhavan, Maharashtra may refer to:

- Lok Bhavan, Mumbai, official primary residence of the governor of Maharashtra, located in Mumbai.
- Lok Bhavan, Nagpur, official secondary residence of the governor of Maharashtra, located in Nagpur.
- Lok Bhavan, Mahabaleshwar, official summer residence of the governor of Maharashtra, located in Mahabaleshwar.
- Lok Bhavan, Pune, official monsoon residence of the governor of Maharashtra, located in Pune.
