= List of ambassadors of India to France =

Ambassador of India to France
- Incumbent; Sanjeev Singla since January 2025
- Nominator: President of India
- Appointer: Ministry of External Affairs
- Term length: No fixed tenure
- Inaugural holder: H.S. Malik
- Formation: October 1949
- Deputy: K M Praphullachandra Sharma
- Website: Embassy of India, Paris, France

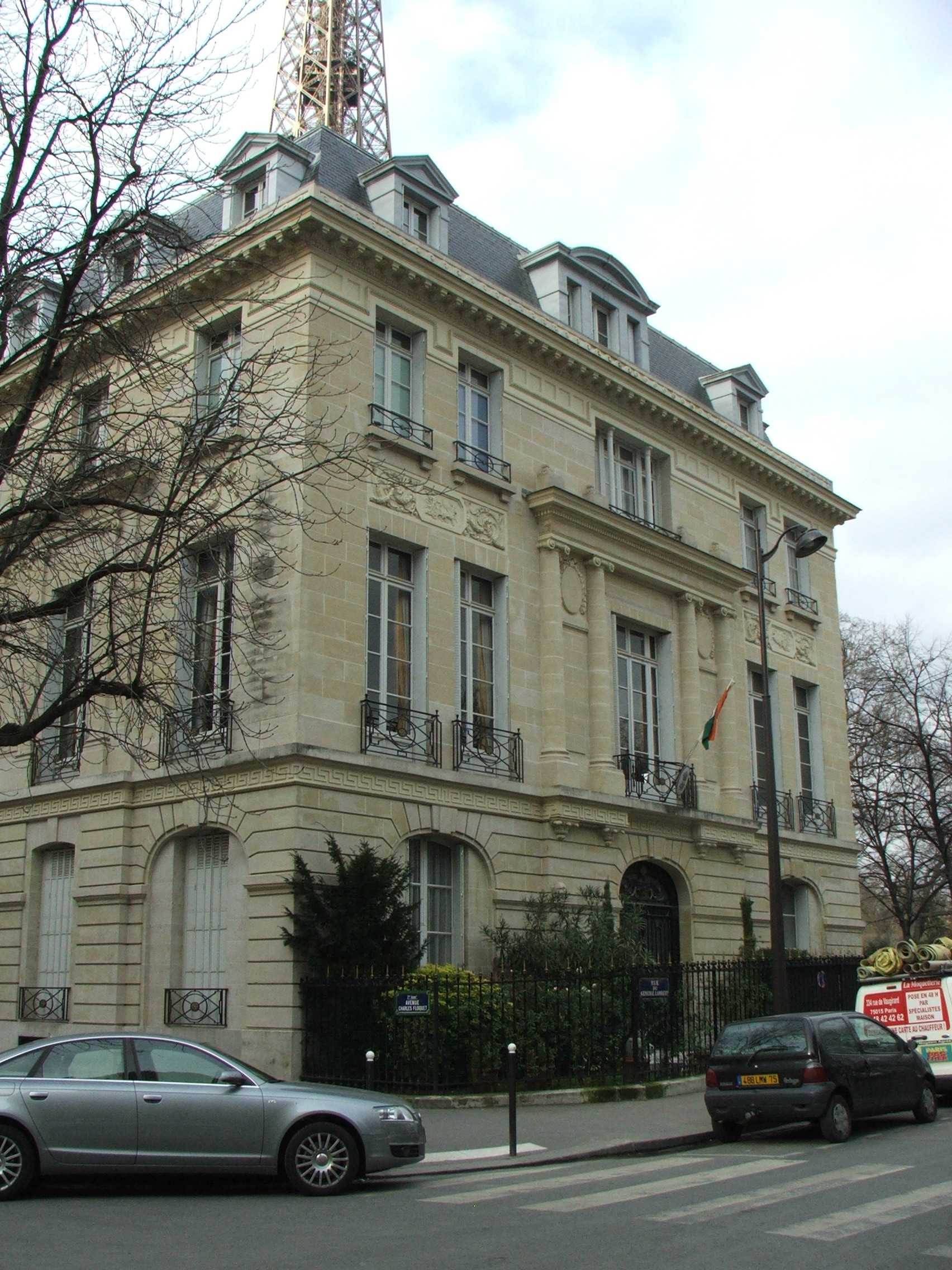
Embassy of India in Paris

The Indian Ambassador to France is the chief diplomatic representative of India to France, housed in the Embassy of India, Paris. The current ambassador is Sanjeev Singla.

== List of Indian Ambassadors to France ==
The following persons have served as the Ambassador of India to France and Principality of Monaco.

#	Name	Term start	Term end
1	Wing Commander. Sardar H.S. Malik	4 October 1949	1954
2	Y.K. Puri	December 1954	1955
(1)	Wing Commander. Sardar H.S. Malik	April 1955	1956
3	K.M. Panikkar	February 1956	1959
4	N. Raghavan	June 1959	1961
5	Nawab Ali Yavar Jung Bahadur	February 1961	1965
6	Rajeshwar Dayal	June 1965	1967
7	Chandra Shekhar	August 1967	1969
8	Dwarka Nath Chatterjee	February 1969	1976
9	Ramchandra Dattatraya Sathe	July 1976	November 1978
10	Maharajakrishna Rasgotra	February, 1979	March, 1982
11	Narendra Singh	March 1982	1985
12	I.H. Latif	April, 1985	1988
13	Soonu Kochhar	August 1988	April 1991
14	C. V. Ranganathan	June 1991	September 1993
15	Ranjit Sethi	November 1993	October 1997
16	Kanwal Sibal	March 1998	April 2002
17	Savitri Kunadi	April 2002	September 2003
18	Dalip Lahiri	May 2004	July 2005
19	T.C.A. Rangachari	August 2005	October 2006
20	Ranjan Mathai	January 2007	July 2011
21	Rakesh Sood	August 2011	March 2013
22	Arun Kumar Singh	April 2013	April 2015
23	Dr. Mohan Kumar	May 2015	July 2017
24	Vinay Mohan Kwatra	July 2017	February 2020
25	Jawed Ashraf	13 July 2020	December 2024
26	Sanjeev Singla	January 2025	Incumbent

== See also ==
- List of ambassadors of India to the United States
