= Bilkees Latif =

Indian social worker and writer (1930–2017)

- Born: c. 1930; Hyderabad, Hyderabad State, British India
- Died: 27 October 2017 (age 86); Hyderabad, Telangana, India
- Occupations: Social Worker/Activist, Writer & Artist
- Known for: Founder of S.H.E.D Foundation
- Spouse: I. H. Latif
- Children: Asad Latif, Asghar Latif & Mariam Sandhu
- Parent(s): Ali Yavar Jung; Alys Iffrig
- Family: Tyabji family (through spouse)
- Awards: Padma Shri

Bilkees Idrees Latīf (c. 1930 – 27 October 2017) was an Indian social worker and writer from Telangana, known for her work in the slums of India. She was a founding member of INTACH.

She is the author of several articles and five books, including Essential Andhra Cookbook, Fragrance of Forgotten Years and The Ladder of His Life : Biography of Air Chief Marshal Idris Latif. The Government of India awarded her the fourth-highest civilian honour of the Padma Shri, in 2009, for her contributions to society.

== Background and early life ==
Bilkees Latif was born into an affluent Muslim family of Hyderabad State in India, the daughter of Ali Yavar Jung, a nobleman of Hyderabad State, by his first wife Alys Iffrig. Her mother Alys, daughter of a French father and German mother, was raised a Catholic in France. She came to India upon marrying Ali Yavar Jung and Bilkees was born to them soon afterwards, but the marriage fell apart shortly afterwards. Bilkees's parents were divorced when she was still a child, and both of them went on to marry other people. Very shortly after the divorce, Bilkees's mother married Ali Mohammad Akbar Hyderi, another nobleman of Hyderabad State, and became famous under the name "Alys Hyderi" as a hostess and a socialite.

Bilkees Latif's father, Ali Yavar Jung, hailed from a landed, aristocratic family of Hyderabad State, one that had served the Nizam of Hyderabad for several generations. He was a diplomat and educationist, was appointed vice chancellor of Osmania University by the last Nizam in 1946, and as vice-chancellor of Aligarh Muslim University by the Congress party's government under Indira Gandhi in the 1960s. He served at various times as the Indian ambassador to Argentina, Egypt, Yugoslavia, Greece, France, and the United States, and ended his blemishless career as Governor of Maharashtra, again appointed by Indira Gandhi, holding that office for a record seven years (1970–76) until his death in December 1976. Sometime after his divorce from Alys, he had married Zehra Ali Yavar Jung, a lady of a background similar to his own, a social worker who was honoured with the Padma Bhushan in 1973.

== Marriage ==
When she was still in her early teens, Ali Yavar Jung arranged in the usual Indian way for his daughter Bilkees to marry into a family of a background similar to his own. The groom, Idris Latif, was the son of Hasan Latif, Chief Engineer of Hyderabad State and the scion of a wealthy, landed Hyderabadi Muslim family. Idris, who was nine years older than Bilquees, was a commissioned officer in the Air Force of the British Raj. The wedding was held when Bilquis was still in her teens, and the marriage proved to be extremely happy and harmonious. The couple had three children, two sons, Asghar and Asad, and a daughter, Mariam.

Bilquees's husband was destined to have a career every bit as distinguished as her father's had been. In 1946, when the partition of India took place, Idris opted to stay with India. He would rise to become India's first Muslim Chief of Air Staff (head of the Air Force). After retiring from the Air Force, he would be appointed Governor of Maharashtra and Indian ambassador to France under the patronage of Indira Gandhi and her Congress party.

Bilquess complemented her husband's career by taking up social work and networking on a level that was rare in India at that time. She owed her networking skills to her mother, a socialite, and her reach in high places to her father. Bilquees came into her own after her husband was appointed governor of Maharashtra in 1982, an office which her father had held for seven years until 1976. During her father's stint, Bilquees (and her stepmother) had already developed a set of social projects, and now, after she returned to the Raj Bhavan in Bombay, she pursued them with renewed vigour. Residents of a certain age will recollect the regularity with which she was featured on television during those years, a time when there was only one TV network in India, the government-owned Doordarshan. It must be said that she made sincere and hardworking efforts to improve the lives of the poor. She took up only a few projects, but those were works in which she was genuinely interested, and then she put a lot of effort into pursuing them. In 1982, she established the Society for Human and Environmental Development (SHED).Her most important social welfare project was the uplift of the poor in Dharavi, which was the largest slum in the world. She documented her experiences in her book, O Dharavi.

Bilkees also wrote several books apart from Oh Dharavi. Her first book, Essential Andhra Cookbook, is a study of the cuisine of Andhra Pradesh. This was followed by Fragrance of Forgotten Years, an autobiographical account of her early years, published in 2010. The same year, she published another book, Forgotten, which narrates the lives of six notable women from Indian history. The latest of her publications, The Ladder of His Life, is the biography of her husband, I. H. Latif, through his Air Force, diplomatic and gubernatorial days.

Bilquees Latif was awarded the Padma Shri in 2009, and the citation mentions her work during the 1980s in the slums of Mumbai. Bilquees Latif died in October 2017 at the age of 86. She was survived by her husband, who died a few months later in May 2018 aged 95, and by her three children, two sons Asghar and Asad, and a daughter, Mariam.

== Bibliography ==
- Bilkees I Latif (1999). Essential Andhra Cookbook. Penguin. p. 330. ISBN 978-0140271843.
- Bilkees I Latif (2010). Fragrance of Forgotten Years. Rupa and Co. p. 248. ISBN 978-8186413401.
- Bilkees I Latif (2010). Forgotten. Penguin UK. p. 200. ISBN 9789352141487.
- Bilkees I Latif (2013). The Ladder of His Life : Biography of Air Chief Marshal Idris Latif. KW Publishers. p. 384. ISBN 978-93-81904855.

== See also ==
- I. H. Latif
- Ali Yavar Jung
