= Zehra Ali Yavar Jung =

Indian social worker

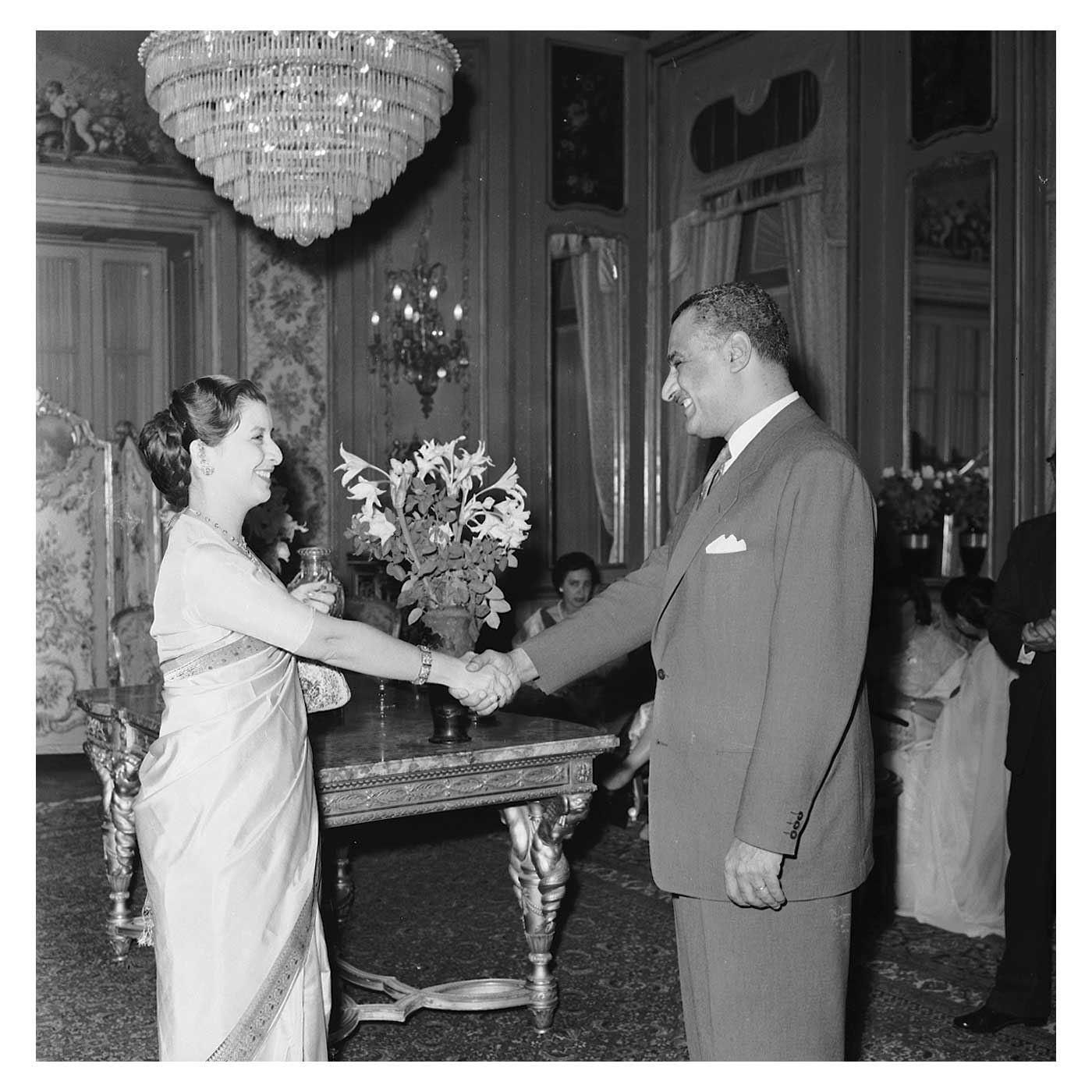
- Abdel Nasser holds a dinner for Ali Yavar Jung, the Indian Ambassador, in Cairo
- Born: India
- Occupation: Social worker
- Known for: Social service
- Spouse: Ali Yavar Jung
- Children: Bilkees I. Latif
- Relatives: Idris Hasan Latif (son-in-law)
- Family: Tyabji family (through son-in-law)
- Awards: Padma Bhushan

Zehra Ali Yavar Jung was an Indian social worker and the founder of Society For Clean Cities (SCC), a non governmental organization working for the welfare of the slum dwellers of Mumbai. She was married to Ali Yavar Jung, a diplomat and a former governor of the State of Maharashtra. She also founded the National Society for Clean Cities, a social organization which runs a children's home in Bandra where children from financially poor families are accommodated and their educational, nutritional, medical, vocational, recreational and cultural welfare are looked after. She serves as the president of the organization. The Government of India awarded her the third highest civilian honour of the Padma Bhushan, in 1973, for her contributions to society.

== See also ==
- Ali Yavar Jung
