= Indo-Abrahamic Alliance =

Proposed regional bloc in the Middle East

The Indo-Abrahamic Alliance or Indo-Abrahamic Block is a geostrategic term coined by the foreign policy thinker and grand strategist Mohammed Soliman in use for a long essay for the Middle East Institute. The Indo-Abrahamic term refers to the growing convergence of geopolitical interests among India, Israel, and the United Arab Emirates, which will create a regional bloc that would include Egypt and Saudi Arabia and eventually fill in the gap left by a future US withdrawal from the Middle East, representing a counterbalance to Turkey and Iran. The Biden Administration later adopted Soliman's Indo-Abrahamic concept by launching the I2U2 Group in October 2021, which was followed by a leaders-level summit in July 2022.

== Background ==
Soliman argues that regional peace and stability in West Asia are not guaranteed through the military presence of the United States but through a balance of power that will eventually moderate the ambitions of rising states in the region, namely Iran and Turkey. His concept fundamentally alters the Middle East's geography, moving away from the Arab World as a synonym for the Middle East to West Asian geography stretching from Egypt to India. Soliman's concept builds on the normalization of Israel's relations with the UAE and Bahrain under the Washington-sponsored Abraham Accords and a perceived rise of an “Indo-Abrahamic“ transregional order. Four months after Soliman's essay, US Secretary of State Antony Blinken held a first-of-its-kind summit with his counterparts from the UAE, India, and Israel to deepen their four-way connections. One year after Soliman's proposal, the White House stated that President Biden will attend a virtual summit with the leaders of India, Israel, and the UAE in June 2022, while in Israel.

== The role of the United States ==
In his 2021 essay for Hindustan Times, Soliman concludes that:

Unlike NATO in Europe or the Quad in the Indo-Pacific, there is no security architecture in the Middle East that could collectively address the challenges facing the region, in the absence of Washington, which has always been the primary security guarantor and regional convener. Now, the broader Middle East is facing a new reality, a different one where Washington is pivoting away— for real this time— from the Middle East and wants to focus its limited resources and political will on another strategic theater— the Indo-Pacific, where China is Washington’s biggest threat. Whether this pivot succeeds is partly dependent on building a regional security architecture for the Middle East that tackles the region’s challenges without the need for a unilateral U.S. military presence. The UAE and Israel are capitalizing on India’s centrality in the Indo-Pacific strategy and Washington’s traditional convener role in the Middle East to build closer ties with both countries.

Soliman argues that the Abraham Accords allows regional actors to better respond to events such as the rise of China. The Indo-Abrahamic block will allow Washington to do less in the Middle East, while still keeping the focus on the Indo-Pacific. Soliman also predicts that in the future, the new Indo-Abrahamic format could empower regional powers to coordinate among themselves on common threats and challenges— from cyber to 5G, from missile defense to maritime security.

== Formalizing the Indo-Abrahamic ==
Soliman advocated for building the Indo-Abrahamic alliance from the bottom-up.

The Indo-Abrahamic bloc can be built from the bottom-up through issue-based working groups focused on critical areas such as space, drones, data security, 5G, cybersecurity, missile defense, and maritime security in the Indian Ocean, the Gulf, and the Mediterranean Sea. The US could also utilize its status as a global power to bring Arab, Asian, and European allies into these working groups. Due to their security capabilities and strategic interests in West Asia and the Indo-Pacific, Egypt, France, Japan, and Korea are the most suitable among US partners to join the working groups. The aim of working groups— and the inclusion of multi-theatre US allies — is to synchronize the work streams among American allies and partners in the region, and eventually, a test run for a Washington-backed bottom-up internationalized security architecture in the region.

== Other proposed Indo-Abrahamic states ==
=== Egypt ===
In his review of Soliman's Indo-Abrahamic concept, Raja Mohan argued for the inclusion of Egypt in the Indo-Abrahamic because of its location "at the cusp of the Mediterranean - Europe, Africa, and Asia, Egypt is the center and heart of the Greater Middle East.” In a follow-up essay, Soliman also argued for the necessity of Egypt to be included.

=== Saudi Arabia ===
In his essay for Middle East Institute, Soliman posed the question of Saudi Arabia's possible participation in the Indo-Abrahamic Alliance:

Another critical challenge for the Indo-Abrahamic alliance is where Saudi Arabia — the heartland of Islam and the biggest Arab economy — stands in relation to the emerging geopolitical bloc. Riyadh has nurtured good relations with Tel Aviv and New Delhi and may look to this grouping as a strategic opportunity in the long run.

=== Japan ===
Soliman furthered his Indo-Abrahamic construct in an essay for Foreign Policy by advocating for an active Japanese role in the broader Middle East region.

During this next phase of its Middle East engagement, Japan has a direct stake in—and is uniquely suited for—helping the region adapt to its changing geopolitical landscape. Multilateral, issue-based working groups, such as one focused on open RAN technologies, could facilitate a broader transregional strategic dialogue that harnesses the Middle East’s access to capital alongside the Indo-Pacific’s innovative potential to usher in a new era of stability and prosperity.

== See also ==
- I2U2 Group
- Abraham Accords
- Alliance of the periphery
- Arab–Israeli alliance
- Major non-NATO ally
- Quadrilateral Security Dialogue
- 2+2 Ministerial Dialogue
- C5+1
