= Navdeep Singh Suri =

Indian diplomat and author

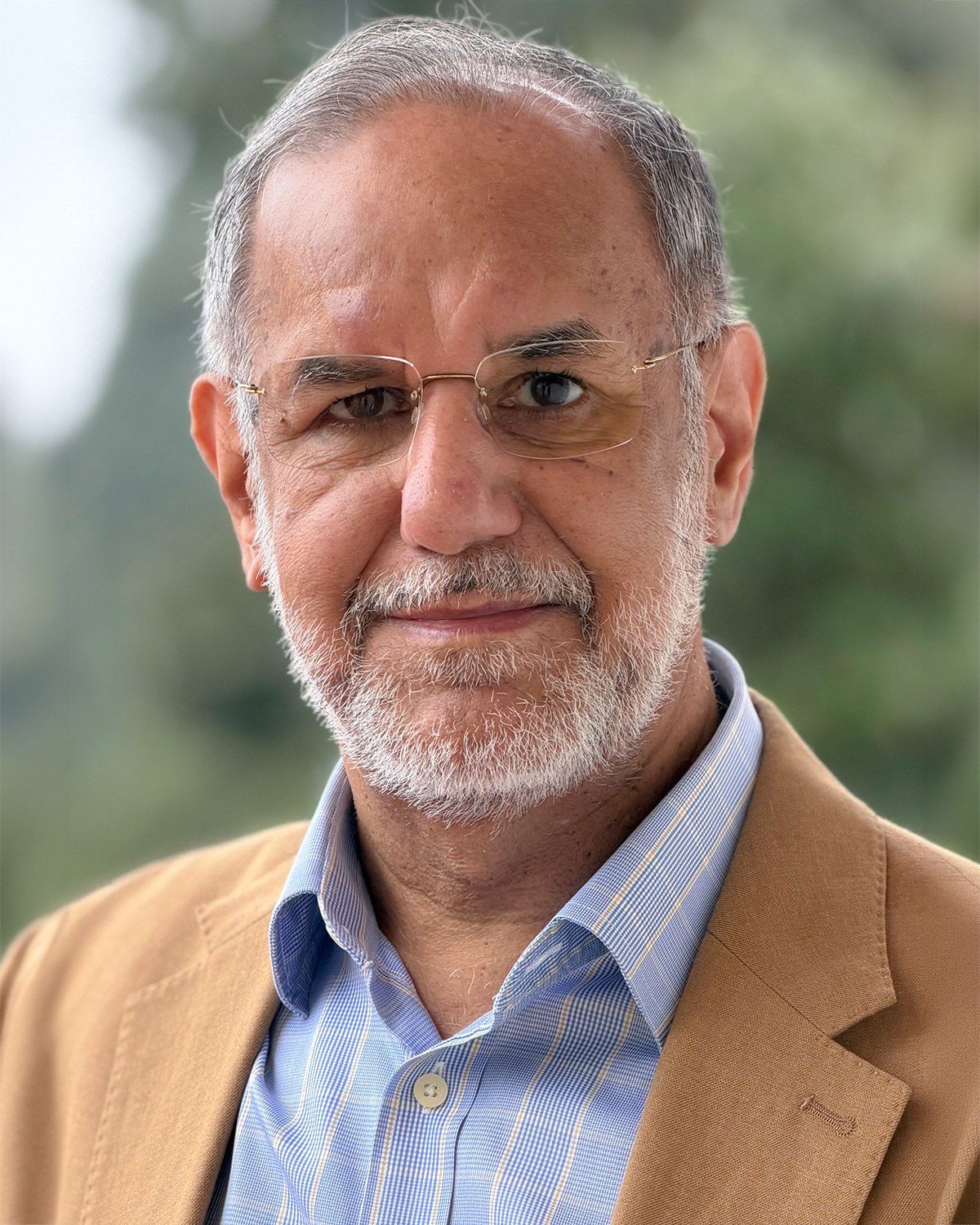

Ambassador of India to the United Arab Emirates
- In office December 2016 – September 2019
- Preceded by: T. P. Seetharam
- Succeeded by: Pavan Kapoor

High Commissioner of India to Australia
- In office April 2015 – November 2016
- Preceded by: Biren Nanda
- Succeeded by: Ajay Gondane

Ambassador of India to Egypt
- In office August 2012 – April 2015
- Preceded by: R. Swaminathan
- Succeeded by: Sanjay Bhattacharyya

Joint Secretary (Public Diplomacy)
- In office 2009–2012
- Preceded by: Vinod Kumar
- Succeeded by: Riva Ganguly Das

Personal details
- Born: 1959 (age 66–67) Amritsar, Punjab, India
- Spouse: Mani Suri
- Children: 2
- Parent(s): Kulwant Singh Suri; Attarjit Kaur Suri
- Relatives: Nanak Singh (grandfather)
- Education: Guru Nanak Dev University (MA in Economics)
- Occupation: Diplomat, author, literary translator
- Profession: Indian Foreign Service
- Awards: First Class Order of Zayed II
- Website: navdeepsuri.com

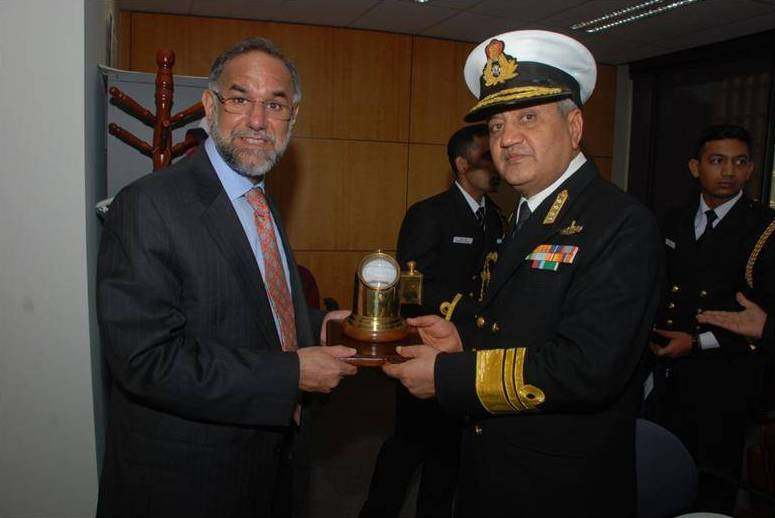
Suri receiving a memento from Vice Admiral Satish Soni.

Navdeep Singh Suri (born 1959) is an Indian former diplomat, author and literary translator. A member of the Indian Foreign Service from 1983 to 2019, he served as India's Ambassador to Egypt and the United Arab Emirates and as High Commissioner of India to Australia. He also served as India's Consul General in Johannesburg and held diplomatic assignments in Cairo, Damascus, Washington, D.C., Dar es Salaam and London. At the Ministry of External Affairs, he headed the West Africa and Public Diplomacy divisions.

During his tenure as Joint Secretary and head of the Ministry of External Affairs' Public Diplomacy Division, Suri was associated with the ministry's early adoption of social media and digital platforms for public diplomacy. In 2010, the division launched its presence on all social platforms, with Suri describing the initiative as part of an effort to use social media tools for public diplomacy. The division subsequently received the e-Gov 2.0 Award for innovative use of social media and Web 2.0 tools.

Suri later served as India's Ambassador to Egypt, High Commissioner to Australia and Ambassador to the United Arab Emirates. At the conclusion of his tenure in the UAE, President Khalifa bin Zayed Al Nahyan awarded him the First Class Order of Zayed II in recognition of his contribution to the development and strengthening of relations and cooperation between India and the United Arab Emirates.

Suri comes from a family associated with Punjabi literature. His grandfather, Nanak Singh, was a prominent Punjabi novelist and writer whose work has been described as influential. Suri has translated several of Nanak Singh's works from Punjabi into English, including The Watchmaker, A Life Incomplete, Hymns in Blood and A Game of Fire. He has also translated Khooni Vaisakhi, a work written by Nanak Singh following his experience of the Jallianwala Bagh massacre.

== Early life and background ==
Navdeep Singh Suri was born in 1959 in Amritsar, Punjab, India. He is the grandson of Nanak Singh, a Punjabi novelist and poet. His father, Kulwant Singh, was associated with the publishing industry in Amritsar, while his mother, Attarjit Kaur, taught Punjabi at the college level.

Suri attended St. Francis School, Amritsar and later studied at Guru Nanak Dev University, where he completed a master's degree in economics. His early exposure to Punjabi literature and publishing would later be reflected in his work as a translator of several works by his grandfather, Nanak Singh, from Punjabi into English.

Suri joined the Indian Foreign Service in 1983 and began his first diplomatic assignment in Cairo in 1984. During his posting, he studied Arabic at the American University in Cairo while receiving on-the-job diplomatic training and later worked in the embassy's press and cultural office.

== Diplomatic career ==
=== Early career ===
Before joining the Indian Foreign Service, Suri worked for two years with the Steel Authority of India Limited. He joined the Indian Foreign Service in 1983 and began his diplomatic career with assignments at Indian diplomatic missions in Egypt and Syria. During these postings, he learned Arabic and developed an understanding of the Middle East.

=== Economic reforms ===
After returning to New Delhi in 1991, Suri was assigned to the Economic Division of the Ministry of External Affairs during the early period of India's economic reforms. He was involved in promoting India as an investment destination and worked with Arthur Andersen on publicity material relating to investment opportunities in India. He also participated in investment-promotion missions to the United States, Japan and the Gulf.

An initiative associated with Suri's work was the preparation of information on India's new economic policies in digital form. The material was presented at an investment-promotion conference in Singapore in October 1991 by then Finance Minister Manmohan Singh and Minister of State for Commerce P. Chidambaram.

=== Washington, D.C. ===
In 1993, Suri was posted to the Indian Embassy in Washington, D.C., where he spent four years working on India's relations with the United States Congress. His responsibilities included congressional outreach and engagement with members of the US Congress. His posting coincided with efforts to strengthen political relations between India and the United States and with the emergence of the Congressional India Caucus as an advocate of closer India–United States relations.

=== London ===
In 2000, Suri was posted to the High Commission of India in London as Press Counsellor and spokesperson. He was responsible for engagement with the British media and communication of the Indian government's position on issues concerning India. During his tenure, he launched India Digest, an electronic newsletter, and appeared as an Indian government spokesperson on British television and news networks.

His posting coincided with media coverage of several major events involving India, including the 2001 Gujarat earthquake, and the 2001 Indian Parliament attack. He also worked on political outreach in the United Kingdom, including engagement with the Liberal Democrats.

=== Africa ===
Suri returned to New Delhi in 2004 and was appointed to head the West Africa Division of the Ministry of External Affairs. He travelled extensively across Africa and was involved in India's preparations for the first India–Africa Forum Summit, as well as initiatives involving the Pan-African e-Network and India's Lines of Credit to African countries. His responsibilities included India's engagement with Francophone African countries, including Senegal, Mali, Burkina Faso, Niger and the Democratic Republic of the Congo.

In 2006, Suri was appointed India's Consul General in Johannesburg, South Africa. During his tenure, he worked to promote economic and commercial relations between India and South Africa. His initiatives included the establishment of the India Business Group and an annual Doing Business with India conference in collaboration with the Confederation of Indian Industry. He also initiated the annual Shared Histories: Celebrating India in South Africa cultural festival, which brought together public and private partners.

=== Public diplomacy ===
Suri returned to New Delhi in 2009 and was appointed Joint Secretary and head of the Ministry of External Affairs' Public Diplomacy Division. He focused on the use of emerging social media platforms as instruments of public diplomacy and participated in international programmes and workshops on the subject, including those organised by Wilton Park in the United Kingdom and the University of Southern California.

In July 2010, the Public Diplomacy Division established an active presence on Facebook, Twitter and YouTube. Suri was closely associated with the initiative and advocated the use of social media for direct communication between the ministry and the public. The platforms were subsequently used for public communication during situations including the evacuation of Indian nationals from Libya.

The Public Diplomacy Division received the e-Gov 2.0 Award in 2010 for innovative use of social media and Web 2.0 technologies, with Suri receiving the award on behalf of the division.

=== Ambassador to Egypt ===
Following the Arab Spring and the political transition in Egypt, Suri was appointed India's Ambassador to Egypt. His tenure coincided with the political transition following the end of Hosni Mubarak's presidency and the subsequent changes in Egypt's political leadership.

During his tenure, Suri worked to maintain India's political and economic engagement with Egypt and promoted Indian commercial interests. He supported the establishment of an India Business Group to facilitate business engagement between the two countries. The Indian Embassy also expanded its use of social media to engage with Egyptian audiences, particularly younger people.

Suri was associated with the launch of India by the Nile, an annual cultural festival intended to promote Indian culture in Egypt. The festival brought together Indian and Egyptian artists and performers and subsequently became an established cultural event.

=== High Commissioner to Australia ===
In 2015, Suri was appointed High Commissioner of India to Australia and took up the position in Canberra in April of that year. His appointment followed a period of renewed political engagement between India and Australia, including Prime Minister Narendra Modi's visit to Australia in 2014.

During his tenure, Suri worked to strengthen India's strategic relationship with Australia, including cooperation in defence and security. He also promoted greater Australian investment in India and engaged with Australian superannuation funds and other institutional investors.

The High Commission also organised the Festival of India in Australia. The resulting programme, Confluence, presented Indian music, dance, theatre, visual arts and other cultural forms across several Australian cities, with 72 events held in seven cities over three months.

=== Ambassador to the United Arab Emirates ===
In 2016, Suri was appointed Ambassador of India to the United Arab Emirates. He presented his credentials in January 2017 and served in Abu Dhabi until 2019. His tenure coincided with a period of significant expansion in India–UAE political, economic and strategic relations.

During this period, India and the UAE elevated their relationship to a Comprehensive Strategic Partnership, with cooperation expanding across defence, security, energy, infrastructure and economic sectors. Defence cooperation also increased, including military exchanges and the first bilateral naval exercise between India and the UAE in 2018.

Suri worked to strengthen economic engagement between Indian companies and UAE investment institutions, including the Abu Dhabi Investment Authority and Mubadala Investment Company. Cooperation expanded in areas including financial services, infrastructure, housing, highways, renewable energy and logistics. He also participated in efforts to deepen energy cooperation between the two countries, including engagement with the Abu Dhabi National Oil Company.

Suri also promoted cultural and community engagement through the Indian Embassy and highlighted the role of the Indian community in the UAE in strengthening people-to-people relations.

At the conclusion of his tenure, UAE President Khalifa bin Zayed Al Nahyan conferred the First Class Order of Zayed II on Suri in recognition of his contribution to the development and strengthening of relations and cooperation between India and the UAE. The award was presented by UAE Foreign Minister Abdullah bin Zayed Al Nahyan in September 2019.

Suri retired from the Indian Foreign Service in September 2019 after 36 years of diplomatic service.

== Post-retirement activities ==
Following his retirement from the Indian Foreign Service in 2019, Suri became involved in corporate, academic, public-policy and literary institutions. His post-retirement work has included board-level responsibilities in the infrastructure, financial services and technology sectors, as well as continued engagement with international affairs and public policy.

Suri has developed a particular focus on the Middle East and India's relations with the region, drawing on his diplomatic experience in Egypt and Syria early in his career and his later tenure as India's Ambassador to the United Arab Emirates. He has continued to contribute to public discussions on Middle Eastern affairs, India–Middle East relations and international geopolitics. He is frequently invited by Indian television and news organisations to provide commentary and analysis on developments in the Middle East and India's foreign-policy interests in the region.

In the corporate sector, Suri has held senior positions with several Indian and international companies. He has served as Chairman of the Board of TCI Sanmar SAE in Cairo and as a member of the Corporate Board of the Sanmar Group in Chennai. He has also served as an independent director of Hindustan Ports Private Limited, the Indian holding company of DP World, and as a mutually agreed director of Hindustan Infralog Private Limited, a joint venture between DP World and the National Investment and Infrastructure Fund.

Suri has also held board and advisory positions in the financial and technology sectors. He is Chairman of the Board of One MobiKwik Systems Limited and chairs its Stakeholders' Relationship Committee, while also serving on its Audit Committee. He is an independent director of Zaakpay and MobiKwik Financial Services. His other corporate responsibilities have included serving as an independent director of SBI Funds International (IFSC) Limited in GIFT City and as a member of the Investors Leadership Advisory Council of HDFC Capital Advisors.

Alongside his corporate responsibilities, Suri has remained associated with academic and public-policy institutions. He is a Professor of Eminence at Guru Nanak Dev University in Amritsar and a member of the Advisory Committee of its Centre for Central Asian Studies. He is a Visiting Fellow at the Observer Research Foundation and serves on the Advisory Council of the Public Affairs Forum of India and as a member of the jury of the Jamnalal Bajaj Awards.

Suri has continued his association with Punjabi literary and cultural institutions. He has served as Vice President of the S. Nanak Singh Literary Foundation in Amritsar and as a member of the local Advisory Committee of Bhai Vir Singh Sahitya Sadan. He has also served as Chairman of the Amritsar Jaipur Foot Centre at Sri Guru Ram Das Hospital that provides free of cost artificial limbs to amputees and restores their mobility, dignity and earning capacity.

Suri has remained active as a writer, speaker and commentator on international affairs and public policy. His public engagements have covered India's foreign relations, the Middle East, geopolitics, diplomacy and regional affairs. He has participated in television discussions, lectures, conferences and public forums on these subjects, drawing on his diplomatic experience in the Middle East and his tenure as India's Ambassador to the United Arab Emirates. He has also continued his work as a literary translator, translating the works of his grandfather, Punjabi writer Nanak Singh, from Punjabi into English.

== Writing and publications ==
Suri has written and published on international relations, Indian foreign policy, economic diplomacy, public diplomacy and India's relations with the Middle East, Africa, the United States, Australia and other regions. Following his retirement from the Indian Foreign Service, he has continued to contribute research papers, policy reports, newspaper articles and commentaries on international affairs. His writing has particularly focused on India's engagement with West Asia, India–UAE relations, India–Africa relations, economic diplomacy and emerging geopolitical groupings.

=== Books and policy publications ===
Suri has contributed to books and research publications dealing with India's international economic and strategic engagement. In 2021, he co-authored A 2030 Vision for India's Economic Diplomacy with Malancha Chakrabarty as part of the GP-ORF series. The publication examines the evolution of India's economic diplomacy and considers how the country can strengthen the economic dimension of its external engagement.

In March 2023, Suri and Kabir Taneja edited I2U2: Pathways for a New Minilateral, published by the Observer Research Foundation. The volume examines the I2U2 grouping comprising India, Israel, the United Arab Emirates and the United States and explores its potential for cooperation in areas including water, energy, transport, space, health and food security. The volume brings together contributions from diplomats, academics, business leaders and policymakers from the four participating countries. Suri contributed the chapter I2U2 and the Case for Minilaterals.

In July 2020, Suri and Manish Kumar, chief executive officer of the National Skill Development Corporation, co-authored Mapping Skills: A Roadmap for India and the UAE, published as an Observer Research Foundation Special Report. The report examined the potential for harmonising and accrediting Indian vocational skills with the requirements of the UAE labour market. It proposed a pilot model for aligning Indian skill-development programmes with specific occupational requirements in the UAE and considered how such a framework could benefit Indian workers and strengthen the India–Gulf migration corridor.

Suri has also contributed to research on India's wider engagement with the Middle East and global connectivity. In 2024, he was among the authors of India–Middle East–Europe Economic Corridor: Towards a New Discourse in Global Connectivity, published by the Observer Research Foundation.

=== Articles and commentary ===
Suri has published numerous articles and commentaries on international relations. His writing has addressed developments in West Asia and the Middle East, India–UAE relations, India–Egypt relations, India–Australia relations, India's engagement with Africa, great-power relations, energy security and emerging geopolitical partnerships. His commentaries have appeared through the Observer Research Foundation and in Indian newspapers, including The Tribune.

His writing on West Asia has included articles such as Black Swans in West Asia, Despair, dread a year after Hamas attack, Shadow-boxing in West Asia, Old-fashioned trust and credibility bind India-UAE ties, From India’s G20 to UAE’s COP28 – A new pathway for climate action and The rollercoaster saga of Israel-Hamas relations. His commentaries have examined the political and strategic consequences of conflicts in the region, India's relations with Gulf countries and the wider geopolitical changes affecting West Asia.

Suri has also written on India's relations with individual countries and emerging strategic groupings. His work has covered India–UAE relations, India's relationship with Egypt and Türkiye, the India–Australia relationship, the I2U2 grouping and India's engagement with the Gulf. His article The I2U2: Where Geography and Economics Meet, published by the Observer Research Foundation in 2023, examined the strategic and economic rationale behind the grouping.

=== Literary translations ===
Alongside his work on international affairs, Suri has translated Punjabi literature into English, particularly the works of his grandfather, novelist Nanak Singh. His first translation was Nanak Singh's 1940 novel Pavitra Paapi, which he translated as The Watchmaker. Suri began the translation while serving as a diplomat in London in 2001–02. He subsequently translated Adh Khidiya Phul, published in English as A Life Incomplete.

Suri has also translated Khooni Vaisakhi, Nanak Singh's long poem about the Jallianwala Bagh massacre, into English. The work was written by Nanak Singh following his experience of the massacre in 1919 and has been described as an important work of Punjabi literature concerning the event. Suri's translation has helped bring the poem to an English-language readership.

His later translations include Hymns in Blood and A Game of Fire. The latter is Suri's English translation of Nanak Singh's Punjabi novel Agg Di Khed, originally published in 1948. A Game of Fire was published by HarperCollins India in 2024 and was shortlisted for the 2025 Muse India Translation Award.

Suri has also written about his grandfather's literary work and the process of translating Punjabi literature for contemporary English-language readers. His translation work has involved questions of language, historical memory and the preservation of Punjabi literary heritage, particularly in relation to Nanak Singh's writings on the Jallianwala Bagh massacre and the Partition of India.

== Awards and decorations ==
- United Arab Emirates:
  - First Class Order of Zayed II (12 September 2019)
- e-Gov 2.0 Award (2010) – Received on behalf of the Ministry of External Affairs' Public Diplomacy Division for its innovative use of social media and Web 2.0 tools.

== Personal life ==
Suri is married to Mani Suri, who holds a degree in economics and works as a graphic designer and potter. The couple have two daughters.

Suri comes from a family with longstanding connections to Punjabi literature. He is the grandson of novelist and writer Nanak Singh and the son of publisher Kulwant Singh Suri and writer Attarjit Kaur Suri. His literary background has also influenced his work as a translator of Punjabi literature into English.

== Bibliography ==
Suri has translated five of his grandfather Nanak Singh's classic literary works from Punjabi into English.

- Singh, Nanak and Navdeep Suri (trans.). The Watchmaker. Penguin India, 2009. ISBN 0-14-306586-6
- Singh, Nanak and Navdeep Suri (trans.). A Life Incomplete. HarperCollins India, 2012. ISBN 93-5029-513-X
- Singh, Nanak and Navdeep Suri (trans.). Khooni Vaisakhi: A Poem from the Jallianwala Bagh Massacre, 1919. Harper Perennial, 2019. ISBN 9-35-302938-4
- Singh, Nanak. Hymns in Blood. Translated by Navdeep Suri. Harper Perennial India, 2022. Translation of Khoon de Sohile. ISBN 9789354897429
- Singh, Nanak. A Game of Fire. Translated by Navdeep Suri. Harper Perennial India, 2024. Translation of Agg Di Khed. ISBN 9789356997561
