= Ali Yavar Jung =

Indian diplomat (1906–1976)

Nawab Ali Yavar Jung

Governor of Maharashtra
- In office 26 February 1971 – 11 December 1976
- Preceded by: Om Prakash Mehra
- Succeeded by: Kona Prabhakara Rao

Indian Ambassador to the United States
- In office 1968–1970
- Preceded by: Braj Kumar Nehru
- Succeeded by: Lakshmi Kant Jha

Indian Ambassador to France
- In office 1961–1965
- Preceded by: N. R. Pillai
- Succeeded by: Rajeshwar Dayal

Indian Ambassador to Egypt
- In office 1954–1958
- Preceded by: K.M. Panikkar
- Succeeded by: Ratan Kumar Nehru

Indian Ambassador to Argentina
- In office 1952–1954

Personal details
- Born: February 1906 Hyderabad, Hyderabad State, British Indian Empire
- Died: 11 December 1976 (aged 70) Raj Bhavan, Mumbai, Maharashtra, India
- Spouse(s): Alys Iffrig (known after her second marriage as Alys Hyderi); Zehra Ali Yavar Jung
- Children: Tyabji family (through son-in-law); Bilkees I. Latif (born of Alys Iffrig)
- Relatives: Idris Hasan Latif (son-in-law)
- Education: Queen's College, Oxford
- Occupation: diplomat, politician
- Awards: Padma Vibhushan; Padma Bhushan

Nawab Ali Yavar Jung Bahadur (February 1906 – 11 December 1976) was an Indian diplomat. He served as Indian Ambassador in Argentina, Egypt, Yugoslavia and Greece, France, and the United States.

He was governor of the Indian state of Maharashtra from 1971 to 1976. He was awarded the Padma Bhushan and the Padma Vibhushan, India's highest civilian honors, in 1959 and 1977, respectively.

== Early life ==
He was born in Hyderabad to a distinguished Hyderabadi family of scholars, administrators and educators, and studied at Queen's College, Oxford, earning a degree in History.

== Career ==
Nawab Ali Yavar Jung served as the Vice-chancellor of Osmania University from 1945 to 1946 and from 1948 to 1952. In year 1965 to 1968 he was Vice-Chancellor of Aligarh Muslim University. He opposed reservation on religious grounds at AMU. In 1946-47 he was Minister Constitutional Affairs, Home and Educational, Public Health and Local Government in the Nizam's Governorate. He resigned from that post in 1947.

He was India's ambassador to Argentina (1952–54), Egypt (1954–58), Yugoslavia and Greece (1958–61), France (1961–65), and the United States (1968–70). His personal rapport with Juan Perón, Gamal Abdel Nasser, Josip Broz Tito, Charles de Gaulle, and Lyndon B. Johnson substantially contributed to their understanding and appreciation of India's independent foreign policy.

He was appointed governor of Maharashtra in 1971, and died during his term as governor at Mumbai's Raj Bhavan in December 1976.

He was awarded the Padma Bhushan and the Padma Vibhushan, India's highest civilian honors, in 1959 and 1977, respectively. The Western Express Highway in Mumbai and The National Institute for the Hearing Handicapped located there are named after him.

== Personal life ==
He married a French lady Alys Iffrig, but the couple got divorced. His daughter with Iffrig was Bilkees I. Latif. Bilkees' husband, his son-in-law, was the Air Chief Marshal Idris Hasan Latif, the 10th Chief of the Air Staff. Later, he married Zehra Ali Yavar Jung, a social worker.

== See also ==
- Zehra Ali Yavar Jung
- Syed Akbaruddin

Academic offices
Preceded by Nawab Azam Jung	Vice-Chancellor of Osmania University; 1945-1946	Succeeded by Woli Mohammed
Preceded by Muhammad Raziuddin Siddiqui	Vice-Chancellor of Osmania University; 1948-1952	Succeeded by Suri Bhagavantam
Preceded by Bashir Hussain Zaidi	Vice-Chancellor of AMU; 1965-1968	Succeeded by Abdul Aleem
Diplomatic posts
Preceded by Jamshed Burjorji Vesugar	Ambassador of India to Argentina; 1952-1953	Succeeded by N. Raghavan
Preceded by K. M. Panikkar	Ambassador of India to Egypt; 1954-1958	Succeeded by Ratan Kumar Nehru
Preceded by N. Raghavan	Ambassador of India to France; 1961-1965	Succeeded by Rajeshwar Dayal
Preceded by B. K. Nehru	Ambassador of India to the United States; 1968-1970	Succeeded by L. K. Jha
Political offices
Preceded by Om Prakash Mehra	Governor of Maharashtra; 1971–1976	Succeeded by Kona Prabhakara Rao
