= Sanjeev Singla =

Indian diplomat

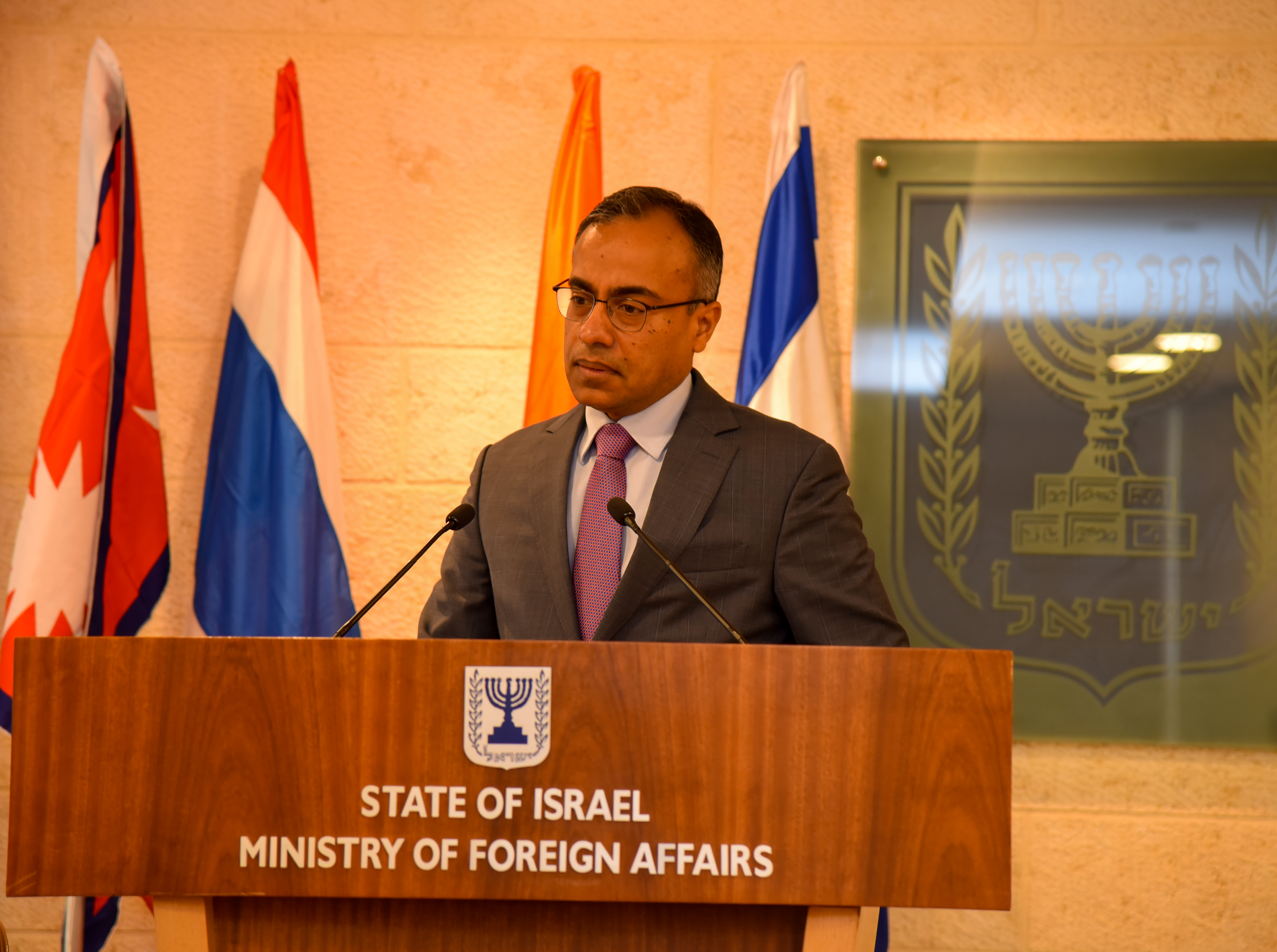

Ambassador of India to France
- In office 2025
- President: Droupadi Murmu
- Prime Minister: Narendra Modi
- Preceded by: Jawed Ashraf

Ambassador of India to Israel
- In office 2019-2024
- President: Ram Nath Kovind; Droupadi Murmu
- Prime Minister: Narendra Modi
- Preceded by: Pavan Kapoor
- Succeeded by: J. P. Singh

Sanjeev Kumar Singla is currently India's ambassador to France and Monaco in the Embassy of India, Paris. He is an Indian diplomat who previously served as India's ambassador to Israel.

== Career ==
Singla joined the Indian Foreign Service in 1997. He has served in various capacities in The Indian Missions at Paris (September 1999-December 2002), Dhaka (December 2005-December 2008) and Geneva (January 2009-August 2011). He also headquarters in Delhi in the Ministry of External Affairs on the US desk (December 2002-June 2004), as Deputy Chief of Protocol (July 2004-December 2005), and as a director at the Foreign Secretary’s Office (August 2011-October 2013).

Singla served as counsellor at the Indian embassy in Tel Aviv from November 2013 to July 2014.

In July 2014, Singla was appointed as private secretary to the prime minister Narendra Modi, replacing Vikram Misri. He held the position from August 2014 to August 2019. In August 2015 he was promoted to the rank of a joint secretary.

In July 2019, Singla was chosen as ambassador of India to Israel, and he assumed office in October 2019.

In January 2025, he is the new Indian ambassador in France and Monaco.

Sanjeev Singla is married to K. Nandini Singla, a diplomat.
