= I2U2 Group =

Inter-governmental economic forum

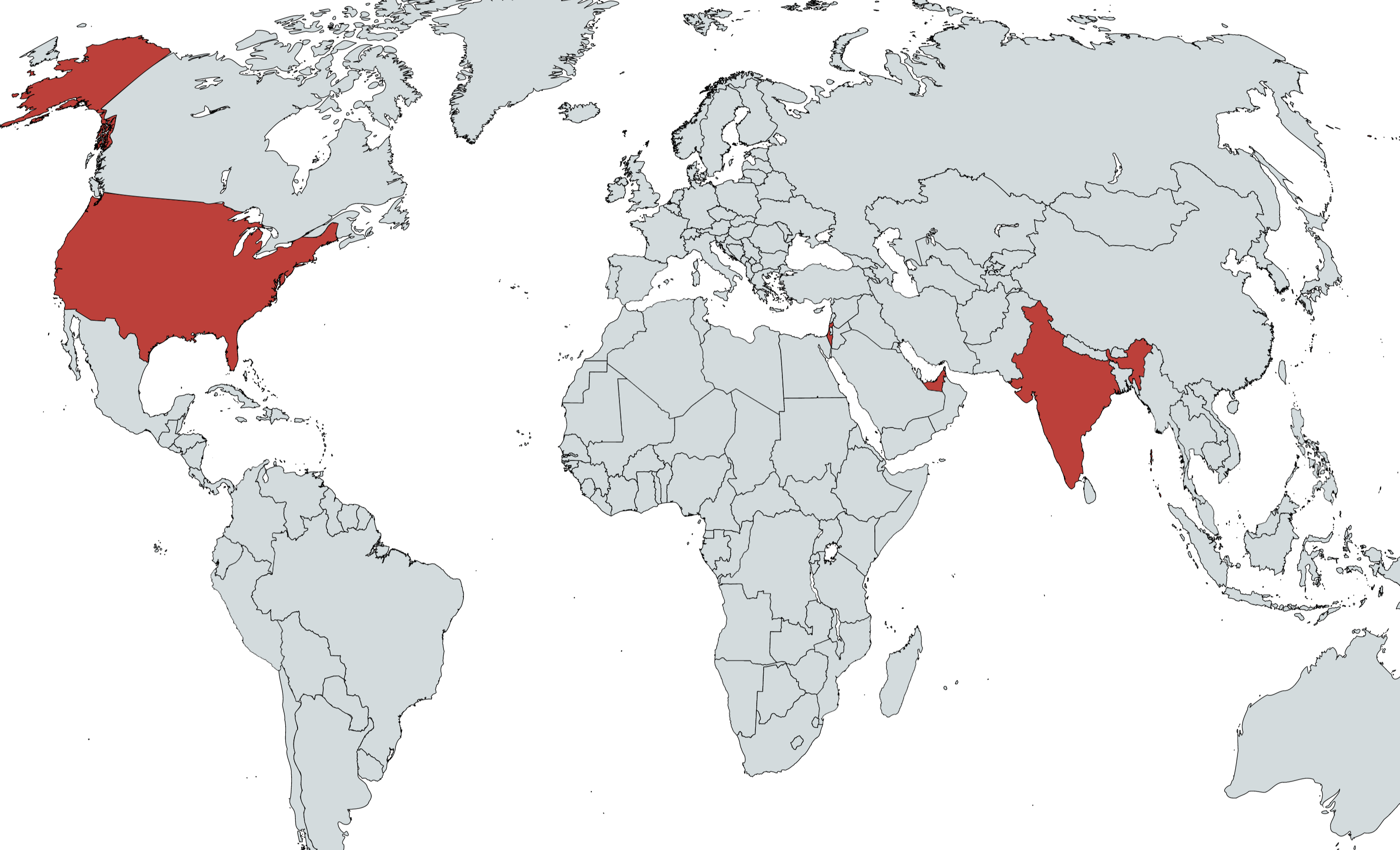
- India, Israel, the United States, and the United Arab Emirates.
- Abbreviation: I2U2
- Established: October 2021
- Type: Inter-governmental economic cooperation forum
- Region served: Middle East, South Asia, North America
- Members: States in the Dialogue: India; Israel; United Arab Emirates; United States

The I2U2 Group, also known as the Middle Eastern Quad or Western Quad, is a strategic partnership between India, Israel, the United Arab Emirates, and the United States. The group’s first joint statement, released on July 14, 2022, outlined its intention to collaborate on "joint investments and new initiatives in water, energy, transportation, space, health, and food security.""

== Background ==
In an essay for the Middle East Institute, Mohammed Soliman, a foreign policy thinker, made the strategic case for a broader "Indo-Abrahamic Alliance" that includes India, Israel, the UAE, and the United States and would expand in the future to include Egypt and Saudi Arabia to create a favorable balance of power that maintains peace and security in West Asia. Indian commentator Raja Mohan endorsed Soliman's Indo-Abrahamic concept and how it "can provide a huge fillip to India’s engagement with the extended neighbourhood to the west." Soliman's strategic concept of the "Indo-Abrahamic Alliance" is hailed as one of the most influential articulations of post-US Middle East and eventually laid the framework for the I2U2 group.

India, Israel, the UAE, and the United States held their first joint meeting virtually in October 2021. At the time, the grouping of the four countries was compared to the Quad. The inclusion of the UAE and Israel in a cooperative agreement of this kind was made possible by the Abraham Accords brokered in August 2020, which normalized relations between the two countries. Soliman intended for the Indo-Abrahamic Alliance concept to transform West Asia's regional geopolitics and geo-economics and ultimately link the I2U2 Plus group with the Quad to shore up an overarching Asian order. Soliman advocates for expanding the format to include more member states such as Egypt, Saudi Arabia, France, and Greece.

Indian commentator Harshil Mehta, writing for News18, called the I2U2 as "a platform for the 21st century, driven by economic pragmatism, multilateral cooperation, and strategic autonomy", which "stands in sharp contrast to old groupings where religion or political ideology would matter."

== Collaborative projects ==
The group held its inaugural summit on July 14, 2022, in which Indian Prime Minister Narendra Modi, US President Joe Biden, Israeli Prime Minister Yair Lapid, and UAE President Mohammed bin Zayed Al Nahyan participated. As an outcome of the summit, the leaders announced that the UAE will invest $2 billion "to develop a series of integrated food parks across India," while the group also agreed to proceed with "a hybrid renewable energy project in India's Gujarat State consisting of 300 megawatts (MW) of wind and solar capacity complemented by a battery energy storage system." Due to the actual needs of all parties, the I2U2's main cooperation focuses on economic growth and trade synergies, unlike the Quad based on defence and security.

On September 21, 2023, under the I2U2 group's focus area of space, the governments of India, Israel, the United Arab Emirates, and the United States announced a new joint space venture on the margins of the United Nations General Assembly in New York. Primarily using the space-based observation data and capabilities of the four I2U2 partner countries, this project aims to create a unique space-based tool for policymakers, institutions, and entrepreneurs, enabling their work on environmental and climate change challenges and furthering our cooperation in the applications of space data for the greater good of humanity.

The I2U2 members also signed a Memorandum of Understanding with the US-UAE Business Council, the UAE-India Business Council, and the UAE-Israel Business Council to create the I2U2 Private Enterprise Partnership. This new public-private partnership will work to increase awareness of the I2U2 initiative in business communities and support projects and other efforts that further the goals of the initiative.

== I2U2 Plus ==
=== Egypt ===
Raja Mohan argued for the inclusion of Egypt in the Indo-Abrahamic framework because of its location "at the cusp of the Mediterranean – Europe, Africa, and Asia, Egypt is the center and heart of the Greater Middle East." Soliman concurred with Mohan on the strategic need to bring Egypt into the Indo-Abrahamic framework/I2U2 group because of Cairo's civilizational outlook, demographics, geography, economic and military power, and geopolitical aspiration.

=== Saudi Arabia ===
Soliman argued that the inclusion of Saudi Arabia under the Indo-Abrahamic framework/I2U2 is "critical to the development of a West Asian system that ensures long-term peace and stability."

== Summits ==
I2U2 Summits
#	Year	Dates	Country	City	Leaders	Ref.	Image
1	2022	July 14	Israel	Virtual/Jerusalem	4: Narendra Modi; Yair Lapid; Mohamed bin Zayed Al Nahyan; Joe Biden		
