= Idris Hasan Latif =

Air chief marshal IAF (1923–2018)

Air Chief Marshal Idris Hasan Latif PVSM
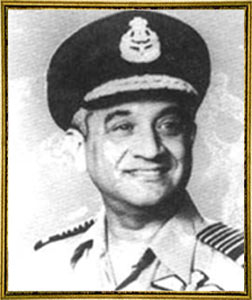

12th Indian Ambassador to France
- In office April 1985 – August 1988
- Preceded by: Narendra Singh
- Succeeded by: Mrs. Soonu Kochhar

8th Governor of Maharashtra
- In office 6 March 1982 – 16 April 1985
- Appointed by: President of India (then, Neelam Sanjiva Reddy)
- Chief Minister: Babasaheb Bhosale; Vasantdada Patil
- Preceded by: Om Prakash Mehra
- Succeeded by: Kona Prabhakara Rao

22nd Chairman of the Chiefs of Staff Committee
- In office 31 May 1981 – 30 August 1981
- President: Neelam Sanjiva Reddy
- Prime Minister: Morarji Desai
- Preceded by: Om Prakash Malhotra
- Succeeded by: Ronald Lynsdale Pereira

10th Chief of the Air Staff
- In office 1 September 1978 – 31 August 1981
- President: Neelam Sanjiva Reddy
- Prime Minister: Morarji Desai
- Preceded by: Hrushikesh Moolgavkar
- Succeeded by: Dilbagh Singh

Personal details
- Born: 9 June 1923 Hyderabad, Hyderabad State, British Indian Empire
- Died: 30 April 2018 (aged 94) Hyderabad, Telangana, India
- Resting place: Hussaini Alam, Hyderabad, India
- Spouse: Bilkees Latif (m. 1951; died 2017)
- Relations: Tyabji family Ali Yavar Jung (father-in-law)

Military service
- Allegiance: British India (1942–1947); India (from 1947)
- Branch/service: Royal Indian Air Force (1942–1947); Indian Air Force (1947–1981)
- Years of service: 1942–1981
- Rank: Air Chief Marshal
- Commands: Maintenance Command; Central Air Command; Lohegaon Air Force Station; No. 4 Squadron
- Battles/wars: World War II; Indo-Pakistan War of 1947; Indo-Pakistan War of 1965; Indo-Pakistan War of 1971
- Service number: 1804
- Award(s): Param Vishist Seva Medal

Idris Hasan Latif, PVSM (9 June 1923 – 30 April 2018) was a former air officer in the Indian Air Force. He served as the 10th Chief of Air Staff (CAS) of the Indian Air Force (IAF) from 1978 to 1981. After retiring from the air force, he served as 11th Governor of Maharashtra from 1982 to 1985.

Born in an affluent family in Hyderabad, he joined the Indian Air Force Volunteer Reserve (IAFVR) during World War II. After joining the Coastal Flight at Karachi, he spent a year in the United Kingdom with the Royal Air Force. As part of the No. 3 Squadron IAF, he served in the Burma campaign. After the partition of India, he chose to stay with the IAF. He commanded the No. 4 Squadron IAF and led the squadron in the fly-past during the first Republic Day parade in 1950. He commanded a squadron at the Joint Services Wing, the precursor to the National Defence Academy.

As a wing commander, he advised the Indonesian Air Force and helped them induct jet fighters in 1955. After attending the Defence Services Staff College in 1957, he served as the senior air staff and administrative officer of the Maintenance Command. Promoted to group captain, he served as the station commander in Hyderabad, commanding the airbases at Begumpet and Hakimpet. Latif served as the air attaché at the Embassy of India, Washington, D.C. from 1961 to 1965.

From 1965 to 1966, Latif served as the air defence commander and the senior air staff officer of the Eastern Air Command. In 1967, he attended the National Defence College. He subsequently commanded the Lohegaon airbase from 1968 to 1970. In August 1970, he was promoted to air vice marshal and took over as the first ACAS (Plans) at Air HQ. He was awarded the Param Vishisht Seva Medal in 1971. He served in this appointment during the Indo-Pakistani War of 1971. In the rank of Air Marshal, from 1974 to 1978, he served as the air officer-in-charge administration at Air HQ and air officer commanding-in-chief (AOC-in-C) of the Central Air Command and the Maintenance Command. In 1977, Latif was posted as vice chief of air staff and took over as chief of air staff on 1 September 1978.

After retirement from military service, Latif served as the governor of Maharashtra from 1982 to 1985. He also held additional charge as Administrator of Goa, Daman and Diu and Administrator of Dadra and Nagar Haveli. From 1985 to 1988, he served as the Indian ambassador to France.

== Early life and education ==
Latif was born on 9 June 1923 in the princely state of Hyderabad into an educated and affluent Sulaymani Bohra Muslim family, a large family of seven siblings. His father, Hasan Latif, was a civil engineer who had studied at King's College London and in Heidelberg. After joining the engineering department of the Nizam's government as an assistant engineer, he rose to become the chief engineer of Hyderabad State. His mother, Leila Hydari was the niece and adoptive daughter of Akbar Hydari, former Prime Minister of Hyderabad. His maternal great-grandmother's brother was the barrister Badruddin Tyabji.

He spent his early years in Warangal, where his father was posted, and later moved to Khairtabad in Hyderabad. He attended the St. George's Grammar School and the Madrasa-i-Aliya. All the siblings loved horse riding, having been trained at a Hyderabad State Forces training institution at Masab Tank. After his matriculation, he attended the Nizam College. His ambition was to join the Hyderabad Forest Service; however, after seeing World War II recruitment posters, he decided to join the Air Force.

After being interviewed by the British Resident at the Residency House (now Rashtrapati Nilayam) in Bolarum, Latif was selected to join the Indian Air Force volunteer Reserve (IAFVR). He was sent to the Madras Flying Club to complete 25 hours of flying on the de Havilland Tiger Moth. He was then trained at the Initial Training Wing at Walton, Lahore and at the No.1 Elementary Flying Training School (EFTS) at Begumpet. Subsequently, he attended the Advanced Flying School at Ambala where he flew the Hawker Hart and Audax.

== Military career ==
=== World War II ===
Latif was commissioned into the Indian Air Force on 26 January 1942 as an acting pilot officer. He joined the No. 6 Coastal Flight based out of RAF Drigh Road. Flying the Westland Wapiti and Audax, he conducted anti-submarine patrols off Karachi.

In 1943, Latif promoted to the rank of flying officer and posted to the No. 3 Squadron IAF, commanded by Squadron Leader DAR Nanda, based at RAF Station Kohat. The airbase was commanded by Wing Commander (later Air Marshal & CAS) Subroto Mukerjee, the first Indian officer to command an airbase. He flew operational missions in the North-West Frontier Province, periodically flying to the advance base at Miramshah. Later in the year, he was among the few Indian pilots to be seconded to the Royal Air Force (RAF). He was trained on the Hawker Hurricane and the Supermarine Spitfire along with the operational squadrons of the RAF.

He returned to India in May 1944 and joined the No. 3 Squadron, flying the Hawker Hurricane during the Burma campaign on the Arakan Front during World War II where he distinguished himself. He subsequently joined the No. 9 Squadron IAF commanded by Squadron Leader Asghar Khan, who later rose to become the commander in chief of the Pakistan Air Force. In early 1947, he was posted to the Air Force Selection Board in Dehradun.

=== Post-Independence ===
Latif was promoted to the rank of squadron leader and appointed commanding officer of No. 4 Squadron IAF. The squadron was equipped with the Hawker Tempest. He led his squadron during the first fly past over during the Delhi Republic Day parade in January 1950. 23 aircraft were part of the flypast in formation of the letters I, A and F. In 1951, he was posted to the Joint Services Wing (JSW) (later National Defence Academy, Pune) at Dehradun. At JSW, there were four squadrons – A, B, C and D. He commanded the 'Charlie' squadron while Major (later General and COAS) K. V. Krishna Rao commanded D squadron.

In July 1952, Latif was promoted to the acting rank of wing commander and appointed deputy director weapons at Air headquarters. He was also appointed deputy director operations shortly afterwards. He was promoted substantive wing commander on 1 October 1954. After a three-year stint at Air HQ, in late 1955, he was deputed as an advisor to the newly created Indonesian Air Force. He was part of the team which helped induct the de Havilland Vampire jet fighters. He worked closely with the Chief of Staff of the Indonesian Air Force Air Marshal Soerjadi Soerjadarma.

In September 1957, Latif was selected to attend the Defence Services Staff College at Wellington. He was the senior-most IAF officer in the batch which also included future CAS Lakshman Madhav Katre. After the year-long staff course, he was appointed senior air & administration staff officer (SAASO) of the Maintenance Command, which was commanded by the legendary Air Vice Marshal Harjinder Singh, at Kanpur.

In June 1959, Latif was promoted to the acting rank of group captain and appointed station commander in Hyderabad commanding Hakimpet Air Force Station and Begumpet Air Force Station. The Transport Training Wing (TTW) equipped with English Electric Canberras and the Navigation and Signals School (N&SS) equipped with Dakotas were based at Begumpet while the Fighter training Wing was based at Hakimpet. During this tenure, he was the senior-most air force officer in the twin cities of Hyderabad and Secunderabad.

Latif was appointed the air attaché at the Embassy of India, Washington, D.C. in early 1961. The Ambassador of India to the United States was B K Nehru. He simultaneously held the office of Air adviser to the high commissioner of India to Canada. On 1 October 1962, he was promoted substantive group captain. After a three-year term as air attaché, he was asked by the CAS Air Marshal Arjan Singh to continue on an extended term in the acting rank of air commodore.

=== Air rank ===
Latif returned to India in June 1965 and appointed the first air defence controller of the Eastern Air Command in Shillong. He served in this appointment during the Indo-Pakistani War of 1965. In June 1966, he took over as the senior air staff officer (SASO) of the Eastern Air Command. After a year-long tenure as SASO, he was selected to attend the National Defence College (NDC) in early 1967. He was promoted to the substantive rank of Air Commodore on 1 April 1967 when he was attending the NDC course. In January 1968, he took over as the air officer commanding Jammu and Kashmir at Udhampur Air Force Station where he served a very short stint. In March, he took over as air officer commanding Air Force Station Lohegaon in Pune. He had a varied inventory of fighters, bombers, four-engined transport aircraft and Consolidated B-24 Liberator of World War II vintage at the airbase.

As an air marshal c. 1975

In August 1970, Latif was promoted to the acting rank of air vice marshal and appointed to the newly created position of assistant chief of air staff plans (ACAS (Plans)) at Air HQ under CAS Air Chief Marshal Pratap Chandra Lal. During this tenure, he assessed the modernisation plans of the IAF. He made first-hand observations of the frontline combat squadrons across the country. He was awarded the Param Vishisht Seva Medal on 26 January 1971. He was promoted to substantive air vice marshal on 1 April 1971. He served in this appointment during the 1971 Indo-Pakistani war and was in the eastern sector when the Pakistani Instrument of Surrender was signed by Lieutenant General A. A. K. Niazi in Dacca and the war ended.

Latif was promoted to the acting rank of air marshal in January 1974 and posted as air officer-in-charge administration (AOA) at Air HQ. After a short stint, he was promoted substantive air marshal and appointed air officer commanding-in-chief (AOC-in-C) Central Air Command in Allahabad. As the AOC-in-C, he led the Air Force relief operations during the Patna floods in 1975. The floods were the worst that hit Patna. The Central Air Command, under Latif, flew as many as 20 helicopter sorties per day carrying out humanitarian tasks. On 1 March 1976, he took over as AOC-in-C of the Maintenance Command, where he had served as SAASO two decades ago, in Kanpur. After a year at the helm of the Maintenance Command, Latif moved to Air HQ as vice chief of the air staff in May 1977.

=== Chief of Air Staff ===
In May 1978, the Government of India appointed Latif the next Chief of Air Staff. He took command of the IAF from Air Chief Marshal Hrushikesh Moolgavkar on 31 August 1978. He oversaw the induction of the Mikoyan-Gurevich MiG-23 and the Mikoyan-Gurevich MiG-25 into the IAF. Under him, the SEPECAT Jaguar was procured by the IAF, among the largest defence acquisitions of the country. He also flew the aircraft at one of the frontline air bases after its delivery to the IAF. With the retirement of General Om Prakash Malhotra in May 1981, Latif took over as the Chairman of the Chiefs of Staff Committee. Just before retiring from the Air Force, he flew the MiG-25, which was then just assembled from a semi-knocked down condition by IAF personnel. Latif relinquished command of the IAF on 31 August 1981, handing over to Air Chief Marshal Dilbagh Singh.

== Diplomatic and political career ==
After retirement from active military service, Latif was appointed Governor of Maharashtra, on 6 March 1982. He also had the additional charge as the Administrator of Union territory of Goa, Daman and Diu and the Administrator of Dadra and Nagar Haveli on two occasions, serving from August 1982 to February 1983 and from July 1984 to September 1984. He completed his tenure as Governor of Maharashtra on 16 April 1985.

In March 1985, Latif was appointed India's Ambassador to France. He carried the rank of Minister of State in this appointment. He served as the Ambassador till August 1988.

== Personal life, later life and death ==
He was married to Bilkees Latif, a noted social worker, and daughter of Ali Yavar Jung. The couple had three children, a daughter – Mariam and two sons – Asad and Asgar. For her work in the Dharavi slum of Mumbai, Bilkees was awarded the Padma Shri in 2009. She also penned multiple books including the biography of her husband, The Ladder of His Life (Biography of Air Chief Marshal Idris Hasan Latif, PVSM), which was published in 2013. She died in 2017, a year before her husband's death in 2018.

Latif's health started deteriorating after the death of Bilkees. He was ailing for some time before dying at a private hospital on 30 April 2018, at the age of 95.

== Awards and decorations ==

Param Vishisht Seva Medal	General Service Medal 1947		Poorvi Star
Paschimi Star	Raksha Medal	Sangram Medal	Videsh Seva Medal
Indian Independence Medal	25th Independence Anniversary Medal	20 Years Long Service Medal	9 Years Long Service Medal
1939–45 Star	Burma Star	Defence Medal (United Kingdom)	War Medal 1939–1945

== Dates of rank ==
Insignia	Rank	Component	Date of rank
	Pilot Officer	Royal Indian Air Force	26 January 1942
	Flying Officer	Royal Indian Air Force	5 April 1943
	Flight Lieutenant	Indian Air Force	15 August 1948
	Squadron Leader	Indian Air Force	15 August 1949
	Squadron Leader	Indian Air Force	26 January 1950 (recommissioning and change in insignia)
	Wing Commander	Indian Air Force	14 June 1952 (acting); 1 October 1954 (substantive)
	Group Captain	Indian Air Force	10 June 1959 (acting); 1 October 1962 (substantive)
	Air Commodore	Indian Air Force	15 January 1964 (acting); 1 April 1967 (substantive)
	Air Vice Marshal	Indian Air Force	10 August 1970 (acting); 1 April 1971 (substantive)
	Air Marshal	Indian Air Force	2 January 1974 (acting); 27 June 1974 (substantive)
	Air Chief Marshal (CAS)	Indian Air Force	1 September 1978

== See also ==
- Ali Yavar Jung
- Bilkees I. Latif
- Syed Akbaruddin

== Citations ==
Military offices
Preceded by Surinder Singh	Air Officer Commanding Lohegaon Air Force Station; 1968–1970	Succeeded by Dilbagh Singh
Preceded by B S Krishnarao	Air Officer Commanding-in-Chief Central Air Command; 1974–1976	Succeeded by G K John
Preceded by A R Pandit	Air Officer Commanding-in-Chief Maintenance Command; 1976–1977	Succeeded by C. D. Subbaiah
Preceded by A R Pandit	Vice Chief of the Air Staff; 1977–1978	Succeeded by E J Dhatigara
Preceded by Hrushikesh Moolgavkar	Chief of the Air Staff; 1978–1981	Succeeded by Dilbagh Singh
Preceded by General Om Prakash Malhotra	Chairman of the Chiefs of Staff Committee; 1981–1981	Succeeded by Admiral Ronald Lynsdale Pereira
Political offices
Preceded by Om Prakash Mehra	Governor of Maharashtra; 1982–1985	Succeeded by Kona Prabhakara Rao
Diplomatic posts
Preceded by Narendra Singh	Ambassador of India to France; 1985–1988	Succeeded by Soonu Kochchar
