= Embassy of India, Paris =

Diplomatic mission of India in France

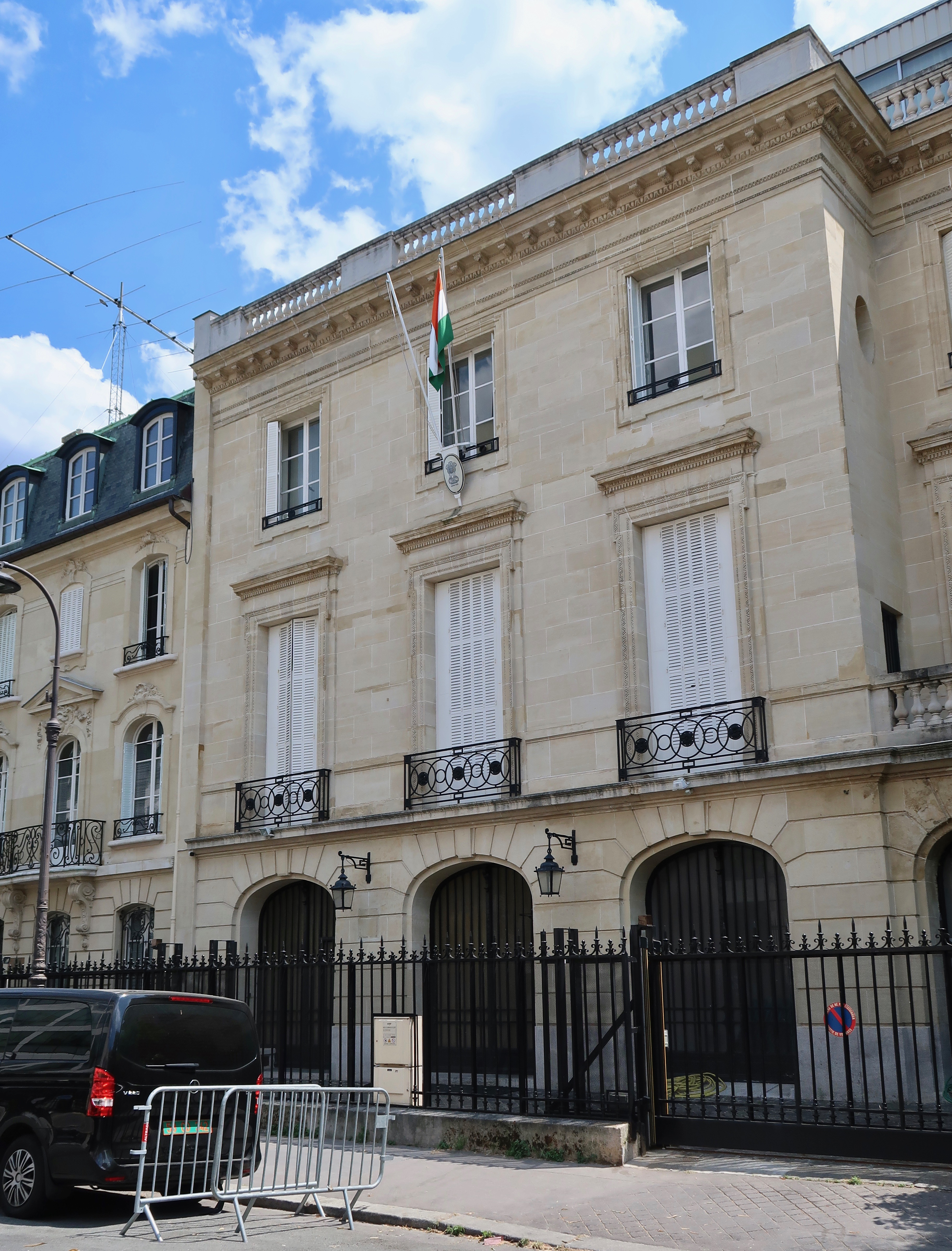
- Embassy of India, Paris
- Location: Paris, France
- Address: 20-22, Rue Albéric-Magnard
- Coordinates: 48°51′37.7″N 2°16′13.5″E
- Ambassador: Sanjeev Singla
- Website: Official website

The Embassy of India in Paris is the diplomatic mission of the Republic of India to the French Republic. It is headed by the Indian Ambassador to France, currently Sanjeev Singla. India also maintains a Consulate-General in Marseille and in Saint-Denis, Réunion; to further enhance diplomatic, economic, and cultural relations with France.

== History ==
The Embassy of India in Paris (Hindi: पेरिस में भारत का दूतावास; French: Ambassade de l'Inde à Paris) was established in 1947 following India's independence. The current chancery building was acquired in the 1950s and serves as the official diplomatic headquarters. The embassy is located in the 16th arrondissement, a district known for its diplomatic missions and cultural institutions.

India and France have shared strong diplomatic ties since the 1940s, particularly in the fields of defense, space cooperation, trade, and cultural exchanges. The Indian Embassy in Paris plays a crucial role in strengthening these bilateral relations.

== Functions ==
The Embassy of India in Paris provides a range of consular services, including visa and passport assistance, OCI (Overseas Citizen of India) services, and support for Indian nationals in France. It also facilitates diplomatic engagements, economic collaboration, and cultural programs between India and France.

== See also ==
- France–India relations
