= List of ambassadors of India to Egypt =

Ambassador of India to Egypt
- Emblem of India

- Flag of India
- Incumbent; Suresh K. Reddy since 23 May 2025
- Style: His Excellency
- Type: Ambassador
- Member of: Indian Foreign Service
- Reports to: Ministry of External Affairs
- Residence: India House, Cairo
- Seat: Embassy of India, Cairo
- Appointer: President of India
- Term length: No fixed tenure
- Website: Embassy of India, Cairo, Egypt

The ambassador of India to the Egypt is the chief diplomatic representative of India to Egypt. The embassy is located at 5, Aziz Abaza Street, Zamalek, Cairo. The current ambassador is Suresh K. Reddy.

== List of Indian ambassadors ==
The following have served as Indian ambassadors to Egypt.

S. No.	Name	Entered office	Left office
Ambassador of India to the Kingdom of Egypt (1947–1953)
1	Syud Hossain	1947	1949
2	A. A. Fyzee	1949	1952
Ambassador of India to the Republic of Egypt (1953–1958)
3	K. M. Panikkar	1952	1954
4	Nawab Ali Yawar Jang	1954	1958
Ambassador of India to the United Arab Republic (1958–1971)
5	R. K. Nehru	1958	1960
6	Mohammed Azim Hussein	1960	1964
7	S. N. Haksar	1964	1966
8	Apa Saheb Pant	1966	1969
9	I. J. Bahadursingh	1969	1972
Ambassador of India to the Arab Republic of Egypt (since 1971)
10	A. B. Bhadkamkar	1972	1976
11	Ashok Sen Chib	1976	1979
12	K. P. S. Menon	1979	1981
13	Alfred Gonsalves	1981	1985
14	S. K. Bhutani	1985	1989
15	P. A. Nazareth	1989	1992
16	Arundhati Ghose	1992	1995
17	Kanwal Sibal	1995	1998
18	S. S. Mukherjee	1998	2000
19	S. J. Singh	2001	2003
20	R. S. Rathore	2004	2005
21	A. Gopinathan	2005	2008
22	R. Swaminathan	2009	2012
23	Navdeep Suri	2012	2015
24	Sanjay Bhattacharyya	2015	2018
25	Rahul Kulshreshth	2018	2021
26	Ajit Gupte	2021	2024
27	Suresh K. Reddy	23 May 2025	
