= K. M. Panikkar =

Indian author and diplomat (1895-1963)

Sardar K. M. Panikkar

Ambassador of India to France
- In office 1956–1959
- Preceded by: Hardit Malik
- Succeeded by: N. Raghavan

Ambassador of India to Egypt
- In office 1952–1954
- Preceded by: Asaf Ali Asghar Fyzee
- Succeeded by: Ali Yavar Jung

Ambassador of India to China
- In office 20 May 1950 – 12 September 1952
- Succeeded by: N. Raghavan

Personal details
- Born: 3 June 1895 Travancore (Modern day Kerala, India)
- Died: 10 December 1963 (aged 68) Mysore, Karnataka, India
- Education: Madras Christian College; University of Oxford
- Occupation: Novelist, journalist, historian, administrator, diplomat

Kavalam Madhava Panikkar (3 June 1895 – 10 December 1963), popularly known as Sardar K. M. Panikkar, was an Indian statesman and diplomat. He was also a professor, newspaper editor, historian and novelist. He was born in Travancore, then a princely state in the British Indian Empire and was educated in Madras and at the University of Oxford.

After a stint as professor at Aligarh Muslim University and later at University of Calcutta, he became editor of Hindustan Times in 1925. Later, he was appointed Secretary to the Chamber of Princes, whence he moved to Patiala State and then to Bikaner State as Foreign Minister and later became the latter's Prime Minister. When India achieved political independence, Sardar Madhava Panikkar represented the country at the 1947 session of the UN General Assembly. In 1950, he was appointed Ambassador of India (the first non-Socialist country to recognise People's Republic of China) to China. After a successful tenure there, he went as Ambassador to Egypt in 1952. He was appointed a member of the States Reorganisation Commission set up in 1953. He was also India's Ambassador to France and a member of Rajya Sabha, the upper house of the Indian parliament. He also served as Vice-Chancellor of the University of Kashmir and the University of Mysore.

== Early life and education ==
Madhava Panikkar was born into a Nair family to Puthillathu Parameswaran Namboodiri and Chalayil Kunjikutti Kunjamma in the princely state of Travancore in 1895. He completed his basic studies at CMS College School, Kottayam and St. Paul's School, Vepery, Madras. Later on he joined Madras Christian College for intermediate classes. At MCC he was a contemporary of Puthezhath Raman Menon, Nandyelath Padmanabha Menon and Sadasiva Reddy among others. He left for England in April 1914 to read history at Christ Church, University of Oxford. After leaving Oxford, Panikkar read for the bar at the Middle Temple, London.

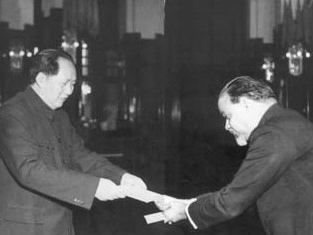
Panikkar presents his credentials to Mao Zedong, c. 1950.

He was the first president of the Kerala Sahitya Academy. After his studies, Panikkar travelled to Portugal and Holland to research the involvement of these countries with Malabar, the results of which were published in the books Malabar and the Portuguese (1929) and Malabar and the Dutch (1931). He was the maternal uncle of the noted poet, dramatist and lyricist Kavalam Narayana Panicker.

== Career ==
On returning to India, he first taught at the Aligarh Muslim University and later at the University of Calcutta. He turned to journalism in 1925 as editor of the Hindustan Times.

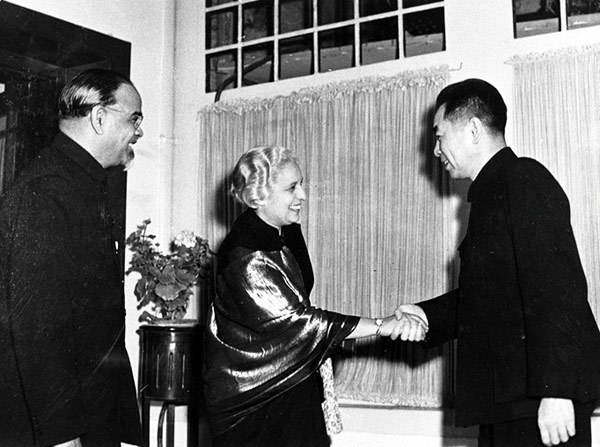
Panikkar (left) with Vijaya Lakshmi Pandit and Zhou Enlai.

For the next 20 years, Madhava Panikkar served the Princely States, becoming secretary to the chancellor of the Chamber of Princes. He also served as the foreign minister of the state of Patiala and as foreign minister of Bikaner, and became the dewan of Bikaner in 1944. He served in China until 1952, building a relationship with Chiang Kai-shek, and remaining there through the Communist takeover in 1949 and the following period. He wrote of his experiences in the book In Two Chinas (1955). This period also saw the completion of his work Asia and Western Dominance (1953). He subsequently served as ambassador to Egypt (1952–1953), and France (1956–1959), before a severe stroke forced him to return to India. He remained nominated member of Rajya Sabha (1959-1961). On recovering, he took up his academic career again, becoming Vice-Chancellor of Jammu and Kashmir University (1961-1963), Srinagar and later of Mysore University (1963-1964). During his political career Panikkar continued to publish articles and poems, and also translated several Greek plays into Malayalam verse.

== Academics and scholarship ==
Early on Madhava Panikkar had cultivated an interest in Malayalam literature, and was a lifelong friend of the poet Vallathol Narayana Menon. He published scholarly works extensively and worked on ancient Indian history and more recent historical developments. Cambridge historian Arthur Hassall wrote that in his "long career as tutor of history at Christ Church" he had "never had a more brilliant student." Madhava Panikkar's interests stretched into diverse fields such as, art, notably novels, poetry and Kathakali and he wrote equally well in both Malayalam and English and published over 50 books and numerous articles.

Madhava Panikkar's interest in European influence on Asia was reflected in his studies of the Portuguese and the Dutch in Malabar (in South India) and especially in his Asia and Western Dominance (1953). In Two Chinas (1955) revealed his sympathy with Communist China.

== Bibliography ==
Notable works in English:

- 1920: Essays on Educational Reconstruction in India
- 1922: Sri Harsha of Kanauj: a monograph on the history of India in the first half of the 7th century A. D.
- 1923: Indian Nationalism: its origin, history, and ideals
- 1928: The Working of Dyarchy in India, 1919–1928
- 1929: The Evolution of British Policy towards Indian States, 1774–1858
- 1929: Malabar and the Portuguese: being a history of the relations of the Portuguese with Malabar from 1500 to 1663
- 1930: The Founding of the Kashmir State: a biography of Maharajah Gulab Singh, 1792–1858
- 1930: Federal India
- 1932: Indian States and the Government of India
- 1934: The New Empire: letters to a Conservative Member of Parliament on the future of England and India
- 1936: The Indian Princes in Council: a record of the chancellorship of His Highness, the Maharaja of Patiala, 1926–1931 and 1933–1936
- 1937: His Highness the Maharaja of Bikaner: a biography
- 1938: Hinduism and the modern world
- 1942: The States and the Constitutional Settlement
- 1943: Indian States
- 1944: The Strategic Problems of the Indian Ocean
- 1945: India and the Indian Ocean: an essay on the influence of sea power on Indian history
- 1947: India through the Ages
- 1953: Asia and Western Dominance: a survey of the Vasco Da Gama epoch of Asian history, 1498–1945
- 1954: A Survey of Indian History
- 1954: In Two Chinas: memoirs of a diplomat
- 1956: The Principles and Practice of Diplomacy
- 1957: Voice of Truth, a topical symposium: replies to attacks on Christians and missionaries in India
- 1957: India and China: a study of cultural relations
- 1958: The Determining Periods of Indian History
- 1960: A History of Kerala, 1498–1801
- 1960: The State and the Citizen
- 1961: Hindu Society at Cross Roads
- 1961: Essential Features of India Culture
- 1962: In Defence of Liberalism
- 1963: Studies in Indian History
- 1963: The Ideas of Sovereignty and State in Indian Political Thought
- 1963: The Foundations of New India
- 1963: The Himalayas in Indian Life
- 1964: A Survey of Indian History
- 1964: Hinduism & the West: a study in challenge and response
- 1964: The Serpent and the Crescent: a history of the Negro empires of western Africa
- 1965: Lectures on India's Contact with the World in the pre-British Period
- 1966: The Twentieth Century
- 1967: Caste and Democracy & Prospects of Democracy in India
- 1969: Geographical Factors in Indian History
- 1977: An Autobiography

== See also ==
- Navtej Sarna
- Taranjit Singh Sandhu
- Harsh Vardhan Shringla

Political offices
Preceded by Sire Mal Bapna	Dewan of Bikaner State; 1944 - 1948	Succeeded by Kanwar Jaswant Singh
Diplomatic posts
Preceded by Mission established	Ambassador of India to China; 1950 - 1952	Succeeded by N. Raghavan
Preceded by Asaf Ali Asghar Fyzee	Ambassador of India to Egypt; 1952 - 1954	Succeeded by Ali Yavar Jung
Preceded by Hardit Malik	Ambassador of India to France; 1956 - 1959	Succeeded by N. Raghavan
