= Lok Bhavan, Nagpur =

Second residence of the Governor of Maharashtra

Lok Bhavan (Nagpur)
- Interactive map of the Lok Bhavan (Nagpur) area

General information
- Coordinates: 21.167871°N 79.074019°E
- Current tenants: Jishnu Dev Varma (Governor of MH); Sudha Debbarma (First Lady of MH)
- Owner: Government of Maharashtra
- Management: Government of Maharashtra

Lok Bhavan formerly Raj Bhavan (translation: Government House) of Nagpur is the second residence of the Governor of Maharashtra, India. It is located in Nagpur, the second capital city of the state Maharashtra.

== History ==
Lok Bhavan or Raj Bhavan or Government House was built in 1866.

In its more than 110 years of existence, the building was used as

- House of the Chief Commissioner of Central Province in 1891
- House of the Chief Commissioner of Central Province and Berar in 1903
- Government House of the Governor of the Central Provinces and Berar in 1920
- Government House of the Governor of Madhya Pradesh in 1950
- Government House of the Governor of Bombay State in 1956
- Government House of the Governor of Maharashtra in 1960

In 1988 it became the second house of the Governor of Maharashtra in Nagpur, the second capital city of Maharashtra; its name was changed to Raj Bhavan (Hindi for 'Government House').

== See also ==
- Government Houses of the British Indian Empire
