= Lok Bhavan, Pune =

Monsoon residence of the Governor of Maharashtra

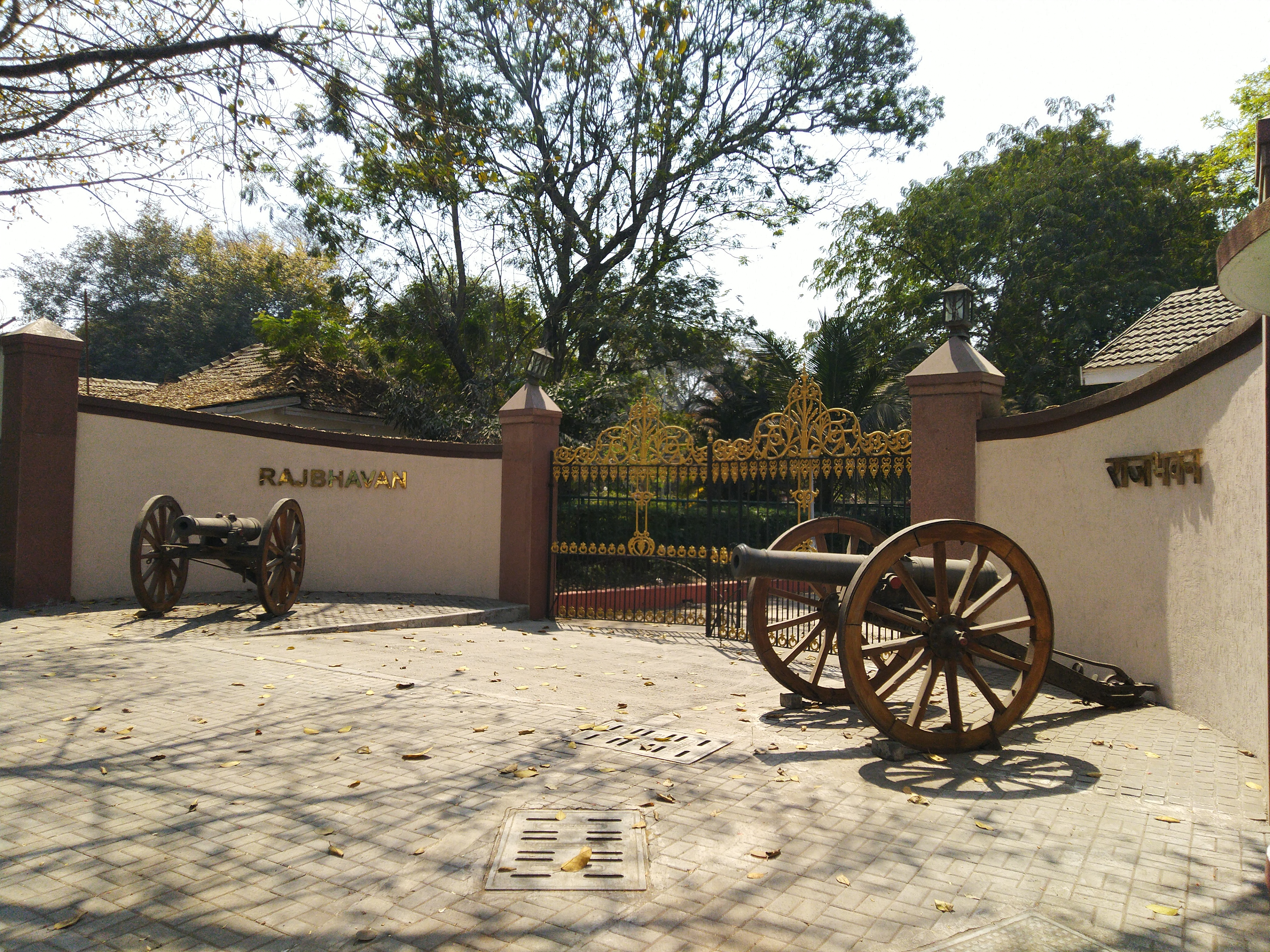
- Interactive map of the Lok Bhavan, Pune area

General information
- Coordinates: 18.5461373°N 73.8247585°E
- Current tenants: Jishnu Dev Varma (Governor of MH)
- Construction started: 1866
- Completed: 1871
- Owner: Government of Maharashtra
- Management: Government of Maharashtra

Design and construction
- Architect: James Trubshawe

Government House in Ganeshkhind at Pune, India - Around year 1875

Lok Bhavan formerly Raj Bhavan, Pune is the monsoon official residence of the governor of Maharashtra. It is located in the city of Pune, India.

== History ==
Raj Bhavan (The Dhapooree House - Pune) were the government houses during the British Raj era in India. It was the monsoon resort of the Governor of Bombay and was built in 1866. The building was impressively designed by James Trubshawe and is situated in Ganeshkhind, Pune.

Today Ganeshkhind might mean the Pune University to most. But half a century ago it suggested the Government House, the monsoon resort of the Governor of Bombay. Yet the name still evokes the memories of that fateful night of 22 June 1897. It was on this day that Walter Charles Rand, Special Officer for Plague in Pune, who invited the wrath of Pune residents for his atrocities, was assaulted by the Chapeker brothers while he was returning from the Government house after attending the Diamond Jubilee celebrations.

But before Ganeshkhind became the official residence of the Governor, there was another house, at Dhapooree, where the story really began. It was here that the political diplomacy of the British, relating to the Southern Maratha Country, took shape. Today its tangible and intangible traces have completely faded out of memory.

Pune has the distinction of being the monsoon residence of the Governor of Bombay, now Maharashtra, for almost a hundred and eighty years, through the period of stay has now been reduced to a symbolic month. Even so, the Governor today attends the Independence Day celebrations on 15 August at Pune just as he presides over the Republic day celebrations on 26 January at Mumbai, Shri Sri Prakasa (1956–1962) was, perhaps, the last Governor who kept the schedule of a stay of four months, away from Mumbai, residing at Mahabaleshwar in May and at Pune from June to August.

== Comments ==
Commenting on this practice Maclean, as early as 1875, remarked,

"Even the Bombay Government stays (at Bombay) sometime, from the end of November to the end of the March, though in most years it takes itself off to Matheran or Mahabaleshwar at the end of February, moves to Poona at the end of May and does not till November come down".

Pune, by then, had indeed become the second capital of Western India. It was the HQ of the Army and of several government departments. Maclean even thought

"it can boast of the finest Governor’s palace in India, a Council Hall big enough for a Parliament of Western India instead of a dozen legislators who assembled in it three or four times a year.

The new house at Ganeshkhind that was completed and occupied in 1871 overwhelmed Maclean.

While the residency at Mahabaleshwar was clearly for physical comfort, to avoid the hot and sultry summer of Bombay, political expediency was undoubtedly the motivation for Elphinstone’s choice of Pune for establishing a residency. It also came with a premium, as the climate of Pune during the monsoon was "as pleasant as the English summer". Despite the inconveniences of travel and often inclement weather, Elphinstone seems to have enjoyed staying away from Mumbai and Parel for he built for himself a cottage at Malabar Point, a bungalow at Khandala and often stayed at ‘Ghorabunder’ with friends in a small but handsome building, a very cool and convenient house for this climate and commanding a magnificent view".

== See also ==
- Government Houses of the British Indian Empire
