= Lok Bhavan, Mahabaleshwar =

Summer residence of the Governor of Maharashtra

- Interactive map of the Lok Bhavan, Mahabaleshwar area

General information
- Coordinates: 17.921318°N 73.638743°E
- Current tenants: Jishnu Dev Varma (Governor of MH); Sudha Debbarma (First Lady of MH)
- Owner: Government of Maharashtra

Lok Bhavan formerly Raj Bhavan, Mahabaleshwar is the summer residence of the Governor of Maharashtra. It is located in the hill station town of Mahabaleshwar, Maharashtra.

== History ==
Raj Bhavan used to be known as The Terraces in the British Raj era. It served as the summer residence of the Governor of Bombay.

The Governor uses this building for a few weeks in summer and undertakes visits from here to the neighboring places to monitor the progress of development projects and attend public functions.

The Terraces was purchased in 1884 and added to the Government house properties in 1886. In 1932, the earlier residence of the Governor, the Bella Vista was discontinued in favor of The Terraces. It, however, seems that both houses were intermittently used, depending on the choice of every individual Governor. That is the reason why The Terraces had to undergo major renovation when the Governor chose to reside at the Terraces.

== See also ==
- Government Houses of the British Indian Empire
