= Hardit Malik =

Indian pilot, civil servant, diplomat (1894–1985)

Group Captain (Hon.) Sardar Hardit Singh Malik CIE OBE
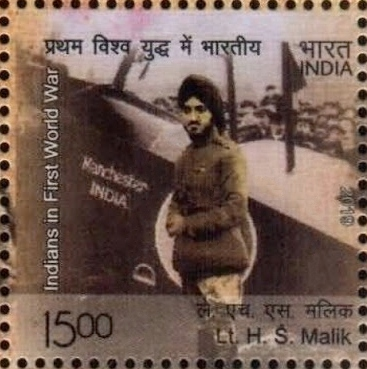

Ambassador of India to France
- In office 1 October 1949 – 1 December 1954
- Preceded by: Position Established
- Succeeded by: Y. K. Puri
- In office 1 April 1955 – 29 February 1956
- Preceded by: Y. K. Puri
- Succeeded by: K.M. Panikkar

High Commissioner of India to Canada
- In office 1 September 1947 – 30 August 1949
- Preceded by: Position Established
- Succeeded by: S.K. Kriplani

Personal details
- Born: 23 November 1894 Rawalpindi, Punjab, British India (now in Pakistan)
- Died: 31 October 1985 (aged 90) New Delhi, India
- Spouse: Prakash Kaur
- Education: Balliol College, Oxford (BA)
- Awards: Grand Officer of the Legion of Honour Officer of the Order of the British Empire Companion of the Order of the Indian Empire
- Military career
- Allegiance: United Kingdom; India
- Branch: Royal Flying Corps; Royal Air Force; Indian Air Force
- Service years: 1917–1919
- Rank: Flying Officer (RAF); Hon. Group Captain (IAF)
- Nicknames: "The Flying Hobgoblin"; "The Flying Sikh of Biggin Hill"
- Units: No. 26 Squadron; No. 28 Squadron RFC; No. 141 Squadron RAF; No. 11 Squadron RAF
- Conflicts: World War I; Western Front
- Cricket career

Cricket information

Career statistics
Competition	FC
Matches	18
Runs scored	636
Batting average	19.87
100s/50s
Top score	106
Balls bowled
Wickets	4
Bowling average
5 wickets in innings	-
10 wickets in match	-
Best bowling	2-92
Catches/stumpings	8/0

Hardit Singh Malik CIE OBE (23 November 1894 – 31 October 1985) was an Indian civil servant and diplomat. He was the first Indian High Commissioner to Canada, and then Indian Ambassador to France.

He was the first Indian to fly as a pilot with the Royal Flying Corps in the First World War. He also played first-class cricket between 1914 and 1930.

== Early life ==
The second son of Sardar Bahadur Mohan Singh and Sardarni Lajvanti, he was born in Rawalpindi, Punjab, British India (now in Punjab, Pakistan). Malik was the title bestowed to his grandfather Sardar Khazan Singh. His older brother, Sir Teja Singh Malik, was an engineer during the contracting of New Delhi, whose daughter married Khushwant Singh, and his younger brother I.S. Malik was senior in the railways.

He travelled to England aged 14, where he attended a prep school and then Eastbourne College, before reading history at Balliol College, Oxford, from October 1912, graduating in 1915. He achieved an Oxford blue in golf.

Malik appeared in 18 first-class cricket matches. He played in five County Championship matches for Sussex in 1914 and then returned to play for Sussex in 1921, also playing one match for Oxford University in 1921. He later played for Sikhs and then Hindus in the short-lived Lahore Tournament in India between 1923 and 1930. A right-handed batsman, Malik scored 636 runs with a highest score of 106; as a bowler, he took four wickets with a best performance of two for 92. He captained the team while at Eastbourne College, and also represented Oxford University in golf.

== Details of service during the First World War ==
He volunteered at the American Hospital in Neuilly-sur-Seine during university vacations. After graduating, he attempted to join the Royal Flying Corps with friends from university but he was denied a commission. He served with the French Red Cross in 1916 as an ambulance driver. After he offered his services to the French air force, the Aéronautique Militaire, his Oxford tutor "Sligger" Urquhart wrote to General David Henderson, head of the RFC, and secured Malik a cadetship. On 6 April 1917, he received an honorary temporary commission as a second lieutenant in the RFC (substantive from 13 April).

Malik trained at the No.1 Armament School from April 1917 and was appointed a flying officer in No. 26 Squadron on 13 July 1917. As an observant Sikh, he wore a turban instead of a helmet, and later wore a specially designed flying helmet that fitted over his turban. As a result of his unusual helmet, he was nicknamed the "Flying Hobgoblin".

He transferred to No. 28 Squadron RFC in October 1917 and served on the Western Front, flying a Sopwith Camel. His commander was Canadian Major William Barker, who later won the Victoria Cross. Seeing action for the first time on 18 October, he shot down a German aircraft and was credited with his first victory. He flew combat missions over France and Italy in late 1917, and secured several kills. On 26 October, he shot down another German aircraft, but was wounded in his right leg during the dogfight. He and the rest of his flight were subsequently ambushed by German aircraft; while attempting to return to base, Malik was wounded and, unconscious, crashed behind Allied lines, his aircraft receiving over 450 hits. He was hospitalised through November. It was later revealed that the German pilot who shot him was Paul Strahlë.

After recuperating and receiving a month's leave in London, Malik rejoined his squadron in northern Italy in early 1918, where it had been assigned as part of the British forces sent to support the Italian military. Unfortunately, Malik was soon diagnosed as having an allergy to the Sopwith Camel's castor oil lubricant and was reassigned to England, where he joined the RFC, now renamed the Royal Air Force, flying the Bristol F.2 Fighter with No. 141 Squadron RAF based at Biggin Hill, alongside pilots from Australia, Canada, New Zealand, Rhodesia, and Argentina. In May 1918 (with effect from 1 April 1918), Malik was promoted to the substantive rank of lieutenant. In the summer of 1918, he was posted back to France with No. 11 Squadron RAF, first stationed at Bapaume, then at Nivelles. Malik was stationed at Aulnoye-Aymeries when the Armistice was signed on 11 November. By the war's end, Malik had been credited with two aerial victories, though he claimed six, which would have made him a flying ace and the only other Indian flying ace of the First World War besides Indra Lal Roy. Of the four Indians who flew with the RFC and RAF during the First World War, Malik was one of the two survivors; the other was Erroll Chunder Sen, who had been a German prisoner of war during 1917–18.

== Later life and career ==
Malik returned to India following the end of the war, and in April 1919 he married Prakash Kaur. She was the daughter of Bhagatishvar Das, a lawyer from Lahore. The couple would eventually have three children, including two daughters, Harsimran and Veena (Raghavan) and a son, Harmala Singh Malik.

Though initially Malik considered remaining in the RAF, he ultimately gave up the idea, as it was unlikely an Indian would be granted a permanent commission. It would be another decade before the first Indian cadets would be accepted for RAF pilot training. Malik relinquished his RAF commission on 16 August 1919.

Subsequently, Malik decided to join the Indian Civil Service. He returned to England to pass the examinations in 1921, joining the service in January 1922 as an assistant commissioner in Sheikhupura District. He was promoted to deputy commissioner (officiating) in April 1926 and to deputy commissioner (provisional) in November 1927.

In the late 1920s, when the Indian Sandhurst Committee was established to select Indians to become the first Indian officers in the proposed Indian Air Force, Malik was one of only two surviving Indians who had seen combat with the RAF during the First World War. Appearing before the committee, he played a significant role in its decision to send six Indian officer cadets to England for pilot training in 1930. Those men - among whom was the future IAF Chief of the Air Staff Subroto Mukherjee - would, in 1932, become the first Indian officers in the Indian Air Force.

Malik returned to London as a deputy trade commissioner from 1930 to May 1934, briefly serving as the acting Trade Commissioner from May–September 1932. and was then Trade Commissioner in Hamburg from 1933. In June 1934, Malik was appointed a deputy secretary in the Indian commerce department, and spent the ensuing four years in India before his appointment as Trade Commissioner to Canada and the United States in July 1938. He served in New York, Washington and Ottawa from 1938 until 1943. Malik was appointed an Officer of the Order of the British Empire (OBE) in January 1938, and was appointed a Companion of the Order of the Indian Empire (CIE) in June 1941. In April 1944, Malik became the Prime Minister (dewan) of the powerful salute principality of Patiala, under Maharaja Yadavindra Singh, serving until Indian independence in 1947 and the dissolution of the Indian Civil Service. In 1949, he joined the new Indian Foreign Service and was appointed as the first Indian High Commissioner to Canada. He then served as the Indian Ambassador to France, during the period when France decolonised its Indian possessions in French India, including Pondicherry. He was also leader of the Indian delegation when the United Nations General Assembly was held in Paris. In April 1956, he was decorated as a Grand Officer of the Legion of Honour by the President of France, René Coty.

Malik retired in 1957 and moved to Delhi. In January 1975, he was promoted to the honorary rank of group captain in the Indian Air Force. He continued to lead an active life until the age of 88.

After a long period of illness, Malik died in Delhi on 31 October 1985, at age 90. He was survived by his wife and children. His autobiography, A Little Work, A Little Play, was published posthumously in 2011.
