= List of governors of Maharashtra =

Heads of state of Maharashtra

Governor of Maharashtra
- Emblem of Maharashtra

- Flag of India

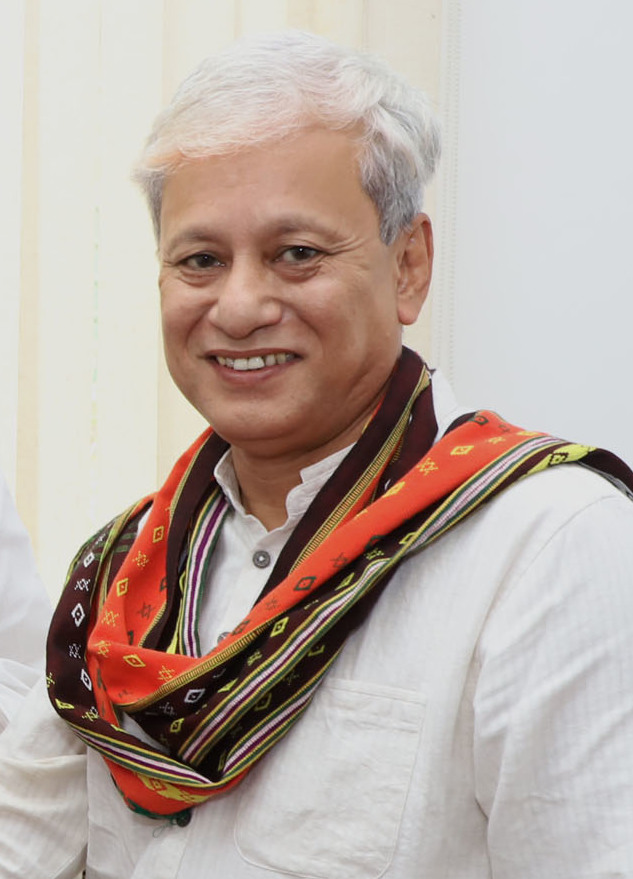
- Incumbent; Jishnu Dev Varma since 10 March 2026
- Style: The Honourable (formal); His/Her Excellency
- Residence: Lok Bhavan, Mumbai, Lok Bhavan, Nagpur, Lok Bhavan, Pune, Lok Bhavan, Mahabaleshwar
- Appointer: President of India on advice of the prime minister
- Term length: At the pleasure of the president
- Precursor: Governor of Bombay
- Inaugural holder: Raja Maharaj Singh
- Formation: 6 January 1948 (78 years ago) (as Bombay State); 1 May 1960 (66 years ago) (as Maharashtra)
- Website: Maharashtra Raj Bhavan

The Governor of Maharashtra (IAST: Mahārāṣṭrāce Rājyapāl) is the ceremonial head of the Indian state of Maharashtra. The Constitution of India confers the executive powers of the state to the governor; however, the de facto executive powers lie with the Council of Ministers.

Jishnu Dev Varma is the Governor of Maharashtra since 10 March 2026.

== Powers and duties ==
The governor formally appoints many of the state officials, including the advocate general of Bombay, the Lokayukta and Upa Lokayukta, the state election commissioner, the chairman and members of the Maharashtra Administrative Tribunal, the chairman and members of the Maharashtra State Human Rights Commission, the chairman and members of the Maharashtra Public Service Commission (MPSC), the chairmen and members of the three development boards, the sheriff of Bombay, and the state chief information commissioner.

== Oath ==
"Mee, [Aaple Naav], Ishwara-chee shapath ghet-to / ghet-te kee, mee nishtha-purvak ani sad-vivek-buddhine, Maharashtra raajya-cha Governor (kaaydyanusaar sthapit jhalelya) mhanun majhi kartavye paar paadin. Mee majhi sarva kshamata vaaprun, Sanvidhaan (Constitution) ani kaaydyache (Law) rakshan, sanrakshan ani jatan kareen. Ani mee swatah-la Maharashtra-chya janatechya seve-sathi ani kalyana-sathi samarpit kareen."

== List ==
Legend

- ^{†} Died in office
- ^{§} Transferred
- ^{‡} Resigned/removed

Color key

- indicates acting/additional charge

=== Governors of Bombay State (1948–1960) ===
#	Portrait	Name (born – died)	Home state	Tenure in office			Appointer (President)
#	Portrait	Name (born – died)	Home state	From	To	Time in office	Appointer (President)
1		Raja Sir Maharaj Singh; CIE CStJ (1878–1959)	Punjab	6 January 1948	30 May 1952	4 years, 145 days	Lord Mountbatten (Governor-General)
2		Sir Girija Shankar Bajpai; KCSI KBE CIE ICS (1891–1954)	Uttar Pradesh	30 May 1952	5 December 1954^{[†]}	2 years, 189 days	Rajendra Prasad
–		Justice; M. C. Chagla (1900–1981); Chief Justice, Bombay High Court (Acting)	Bombay State	5 December 1954	2 March 1955	87 days	Rajendra Prasad
3		Harekrushna Mahatab (1899–1987)	Orissa	2 March 1955	14 October 1956^{[‡]}	1 year, 226 days	Rajendra Prasad
–		Justice; M. C. Chagla (1900–1981); Chief Justice, Bombay High Court (Acting)	Bombay State	14 October 1956	10 December 1956	57 days	Rajendra Prasad
4		Sri Prakasa (1890–1971)	Uttar Pradesh	10 December 1956	30 April 1960	3 years, 142 days	Rajendra Prasad

=== Governors of Maharashtra (1960–present) ===
#	Portrait	Name (born – died)	Home state	Tenure in office			Appointer (President)
#	Portrait	Name (born – died)	Home state	From	To	Time in office	Appointer (President)
1		Sri Prakasa (1890–1971)	Uttar Pradesh	1 May 1960	16 April 1962	1 year, 350 days	Rajendra Prasad
2		P. Subbarayan (1889–1962)	Madras State	17 April 1962	6 October 1962^{[†]}	172 days	Rajendra Prasad
3		Justice (Retd); Hashmatrai Khubchand Chainani (1904–1965) (Acting)	Maharashtra	6 October 1962	28 November 1962	53 days	Sarvepalli Radhakrishnan
4		Vijaya Lakshmi Pandit (1900–1990)	Uttar Pradesh	28 November 1962	18 October 1964^{[‡]}	1 year, 325 days	Sarvepalli Radhakrishnan
5		Justice; Hashmatrai Khubchand Chainani (1904–1965) (Acting)	Maharashtra	18 October 1964	14 November 1964	27 days	Sarvepalli Radhakrishnan
6		P. V. Cherian (1893–1969)	Madras State	14 November 1964	8 November 1969^{[†]}	4 years, 359 days	Sarvepalli Radhakrishnan
7		Justice; S. P. Kotval (1910–1987) (Acting)	Maharashtra	8 November 1969	26 February 1970	110 days	V. V. Giri
8		Ali Yavar Jung (1906–1976)	Andhra Pradesh	26 February 1970	11 December 1976^{[†]}	6 years, 289 days	V. V. Giri
9		Justice; R. M. Kantawala (1916–1992) (Acting)	Maharashtra	11 December 1976	30 April 1977	140 days	Fakhruddin Ali Ahmed
10		Sadiq Ali (1910–2001)	Rajasthan	30 April 1977	8 November 1980^{[§]} (Note: Transferred as the Governor of Tamil Nadu)	3 years, 192 days	B. D. Jatti
11		Air Chief Marshal; Om Prakash Mehra (Retd); PVSM (1919–2015)	National Capital Territory of Delhi	8 November 1980	5 March 1982^{[§]} (Note: Transferred as the Governor of Rajasthan)	1 year, 117 days	Neelam Sanjiva Reddy
12		Air Chief Marshal; Idris Hasan Latif; PVSM (1923–2018)	Andhra Pradesh	6 March 1982	16 April 1985^{[‡]}	3 years, 41 days	Neelam Sanjiva Reddy
13		Justice Konda Madava Reddy (1923- 1997)	Andhra Pradesh	16 April 1985	31 May 1985	44 days	Zail Singh
14		Kona Prabhakara Rao (1916–1990)	Andhra Pradesh	31 May 1985	2 April 1986	306 days	Zail Singh
15		Shankar Dayal Sharma (1918–1999)	Madhya Pradesh	3 April 1986	2 September 1987^{[‡]} (Note: Resigned to become the Vice President of India)	1 year, 152 days	Zail Singh
16		Justice; S. K. Desai (1928–2011) (Acting)	Maharashtra	3 September 1987	2 November 1987	60 days	Ramaswamy Venkataraman
17		Justice; Chittatosh Mookerjee (born 1929) (Acting)	West Bengal	2 November 1987	20 February 1988	110 days	Ramaswamy Venkataraman
18		Kasu Brahmananda Reddy (1909–1994)	Andhra Pradesh	20 February 1988	18 January 1990^{[‡]}	1 year, 332 days	Ramaswamy Venkataraman
19		Justice; Chittatosh Mookerjee (born 1929) (Acting)	West Bengal	18 January 1990	14 February 1990	27 days	Ramaswamy Venkataraman
20		Chidambaram Subramaniam (1910–2000)	Tamil Nadu	15 February 1990	23 April 1992	2 years, 68 days	Ramaswamy Venkataraman
21		Sarup Singh (1917–2003) (Additional charge)	Haryana	24 April 1992	15 May 1992	21 days	Ramaswamy Venkataraman
22		Chidambaram Subramaniam (1910–2000)	Tamil Nadu	16 May 1992	9 January 1993^{[‡]}	238 days	Ramaswamy Venkataraman
23		P. C. Alexander; IAS (Retd) (1921–2011)	Kerala	12 January 1993	13 July 2002^{[‡]}	9 years, 182 days	Shankar Dayal Sharma
24		Justice; C. K. Thakker (born 1943) (Additional charge)	Gujarat	13 July 2002	10 October 2002	89 days	K. R. Narayanan
25		Mohammed Fazal (1922–2014)	Uttar Pradesh	10 October 2002	5 December 2004	2 years, 56 days	A. P. J. Abdul Kalam
26		S. M. Krishna (1932–2024)	Karnataka	12 December 2004	8 March 2008^{[‡]}	3 years, 87 days	A. P. J. Abdul Kalam
27		S. C. Jamir (1931-) (Additional charge till 20 July 2008)	Nagaland	9 March 2008	22 January 2010	1 year, 319 days	Pratibha Patil
28		Kateekal Sankaranarayanan (1932–2022)	Kerala	22 January 2010	24 August 2014^{[‡]}	4 years, 214 days	Pratibha Patil
29		Om Prakash Kohli (1935–2023) (Additional Charge)	National Capital Territory of Delhi	24 August 2014	30 August 2014	6 days	Pranab Mukherjee
30		C. Vidyasagar Rao (born 1941)	Telangana	30 August 2014	4 September 2019	5 years, 5 days	Pranab Mukherjee
31		Bhagat Singh Koshyari (born 1942)	Uttarakhand	5 September 2019	17 February 2023^{[‡]}	3 years, 165 days	Ram Nath Kovind
32		Ramesh Bais (born 1947)	Chhattisgarh	18 February 2023	30 July 2024	1 year, 163 days	Droupadi Murmu
33		C. P. Radhakrishnan (born 1957)	Tamil Nadu	31 July 2024	11 September 2025^{[‡]}	1 year, 42 days	Droupadi Murmu
34		Acharya Devvrat (born 1959) (Additional Charge)	Haryana	15 September 2025	9 March 2026	175 days	Droupadi Murmu
35		Jishnu Dev Varma (born 1957)	Tripura	10 March 2026	Incumbent	217 days	Droupadi Murmu

== See also ==
- List of chief ministers of Maharashtra
- List of deputy chief ministers of Maharashtra
- List of chairpersons of the Maharashtra Legislative Council
- List of speakers of the Maharashtra Legislative Assembly
- List of deputy speakers of the Maharashtra Legislative Assembly
- List of leaders of the house in the Maharashtra Legislative Assembly
- List of leaders of the house in the Maharashtra Legislative Council
- List of leaders of the opposition in the Maharashtra Legislative Assembly
- List of leaders of the opposition in the Maharashtra Legislative Council
- Governors of India
