= C. D. Subbaiah =

Indian Air Force officer

Air Marshal C Devaiah Subbaiah
- Born: 6 March 1924
- Occupation: Indian Air Force

Air Marshal Cheppudira Devaiah Subbaiah (born 6 March 1924) is a former pilot and officer in the Indian Air Force.

== Early life ==
Air Marshal Devaiah Subbaiah, PVSM, VrC, was born as Cheppudira Devaiah Subbaiah on 6 March 1924, and was also known as C D Subbaiah. He was commissioned in April 1942 at the age of 18 and his service number was 1866.

== World War II Pilot ==
He was one of the notable World War II pilots from British India. During the Second World War, he was a Flying Officer in the 8th Squadron of the IAF. During the Arakan campaign in the same war, he was a Spitfire pilot. He was awarded the Vir Chakra and later on the Param Vishisht Seva Medal. He was also part of Squadron 4 that was involved in operations against Japan.

== Kashmir War 1947 (Vir Chakra Award) ==
During the 1947-48 Kashmir Operations Flt. Lieutenant C D Subbaiah was distinguished for the operational missions flown during the war. He was made Squadron Leader and was known to inspire his Squadron Pilots. He flew 70 sorties for a month and a half. The resistance of the enemy at Gurais broke down. This contributed to the successful capture of Gurais by the Indian Army. For this he was awarded the Vir Chakra later on 26 January 1950, the first Republic Day.

== Later life ==
In 1948, three Vampires arrived and were under a unit called the ATU which was under Sqn Ldr Subbaiah. In mid 1949, the ATU was merged with the 7 Squadron with Sqn Ldr Subbaiah taking command. As Group Captain, in 1962–1963, he was the Commanding officer for AFS Hyderabad and stationed at Begumpet. Later he was made Air Vice Marshal and took over command of the Western Air Command. He was involved in studying the air operations planning the missions in the Western Sector during the Indo-Pakistan War of 1971. For this and for his distinguished career he was awarded a Param Vishist Seva Medal in 1972. In 1977–1978, he was the commanding officer for MC and stationed at Nagpur as AOC-in-C. In May 1978, as AOC-in-C, he instated the phoenix crest for the Base Repair Depot of the maintenance units. He retired as Air Marshal in 1978 after serving a full tenure.
