= Lok Bhavan, Mumbai =

Official residence of the Governor of Maharashtra

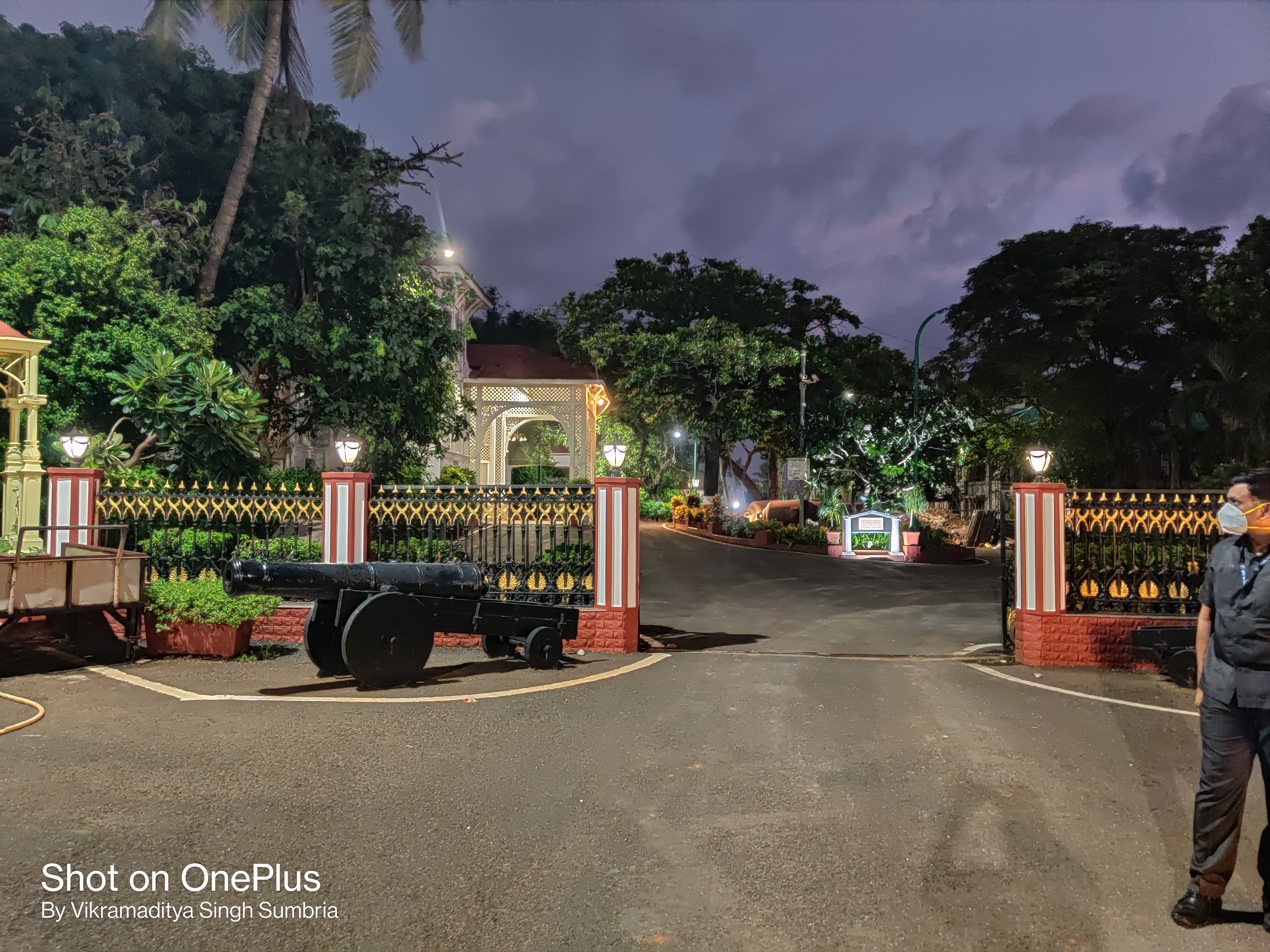
- Entrance of Lok Bhawan, Mumbai in 2021.
- Interactive map of the Lok Bhavan, Mumbai area

General information
- Coordinates: 18.940194°N 72.793436°E
- Current tenants: Jishnu Dev Varma (Governor of MH)
- Completed: 1880
- Owner: Government of Maharashtra

Design and construction
- Architect: Mountstuart Elphinstone

References
- Website

The Lok Bhavan is located in 20 hectares (49 acres) of sylvan surroundings, surrounded on three sides by the sea. The estate has several heritage bungalows, trees, large lawns and a beach. It also hosts mile long stretch of thick forests, a sandy beach and several lush lawns.

The bhavan has a precious collection of beautiful carpets, paintings, exquisitely carved doors and elegant French style chairs and sofas with intricate portraits on them. The bhavan breathes a century and a half of history.

== History ==
The Government House, part of the historic Bombay Castle, used to be the residence of the Governor of Bombay during the British Raj until 1757. The governor's residence then moved to Great Western Building on Apollo Street, then to Parel (the site of the present Haffkine Institute) before finally settling at Malabar point in 1885.

== Gallery ==
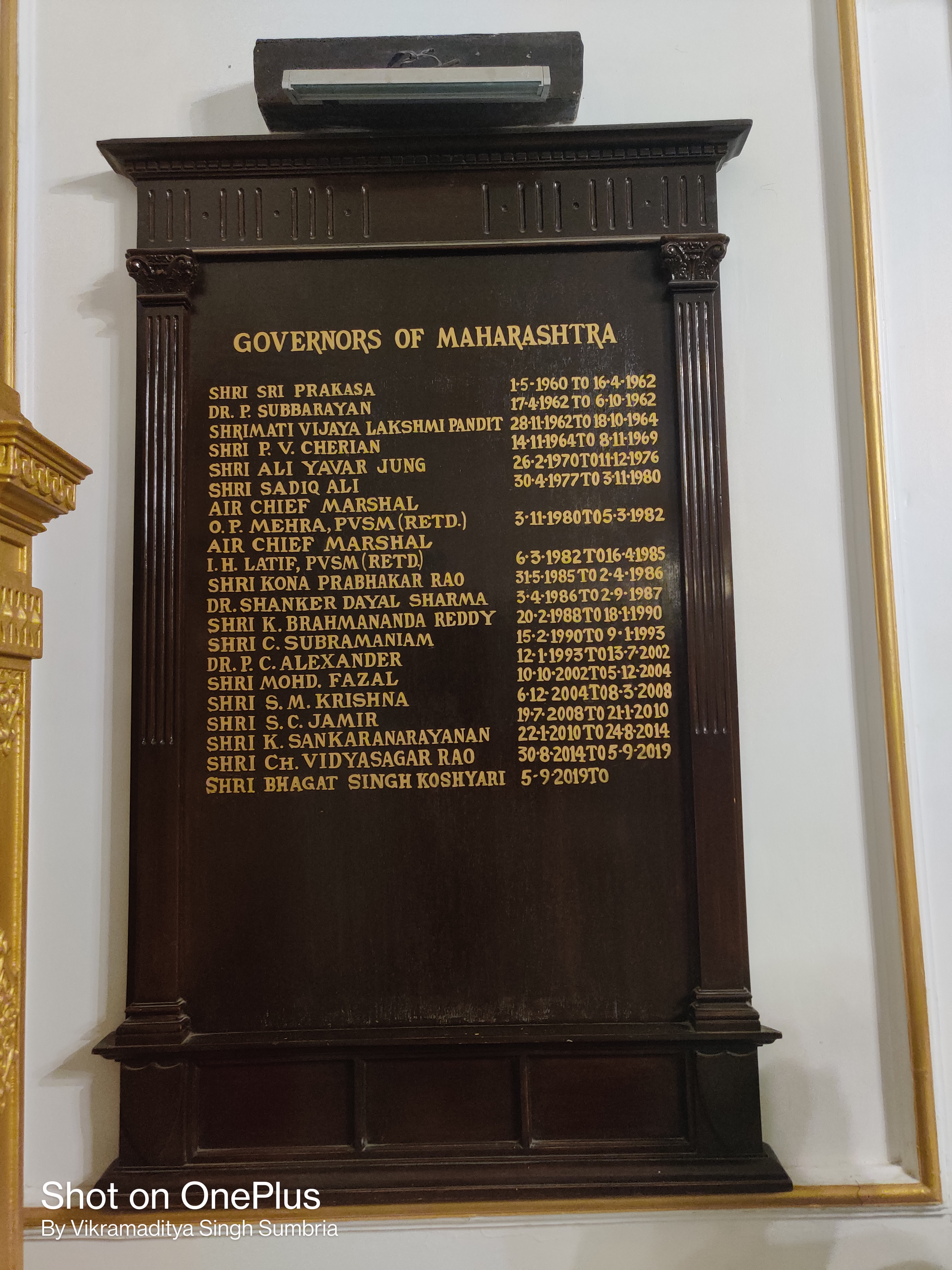
Wall Plaque of Governors of Maharashtra from 1960 to 2021.

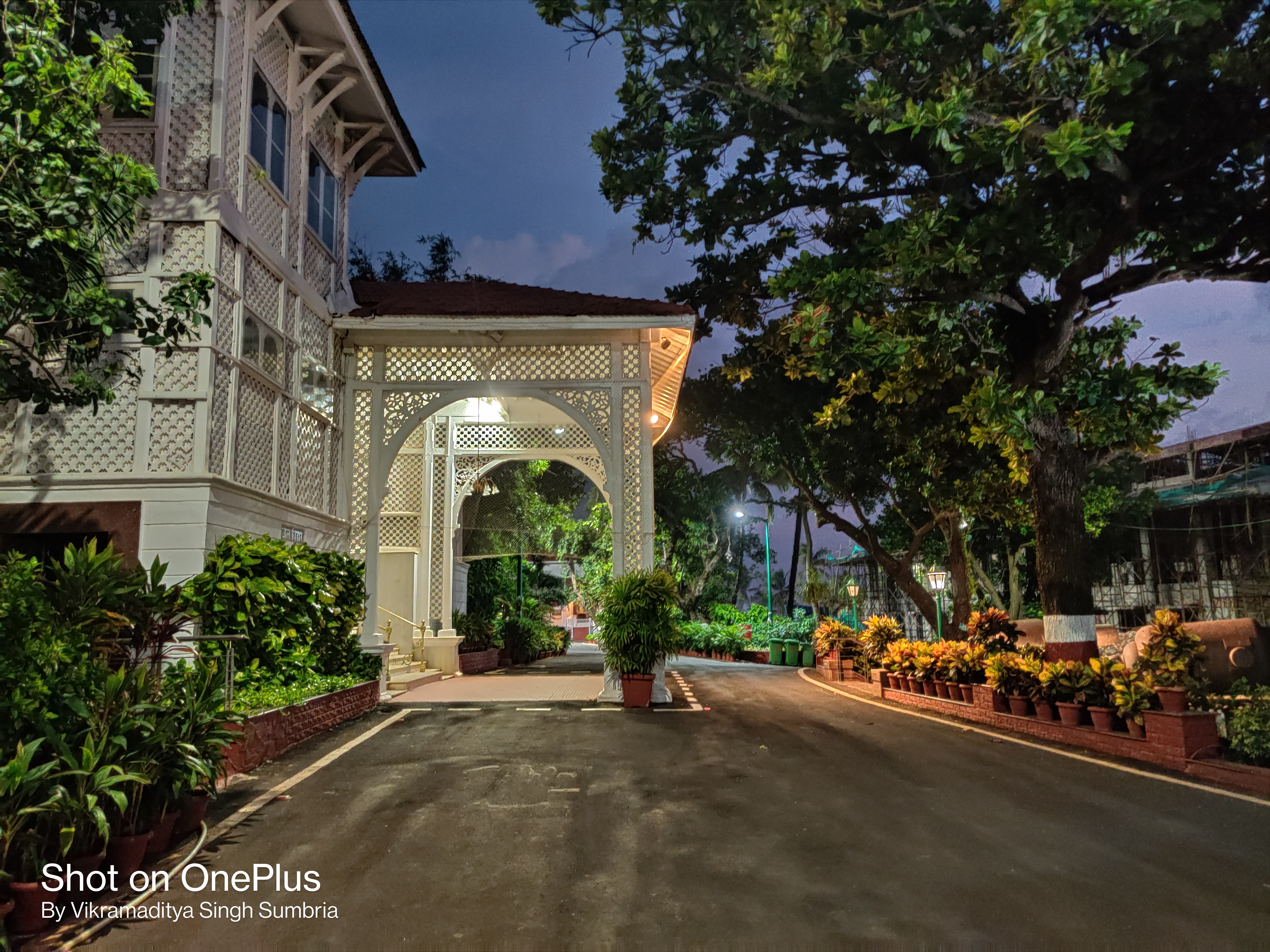
Entrance of Ball Room.

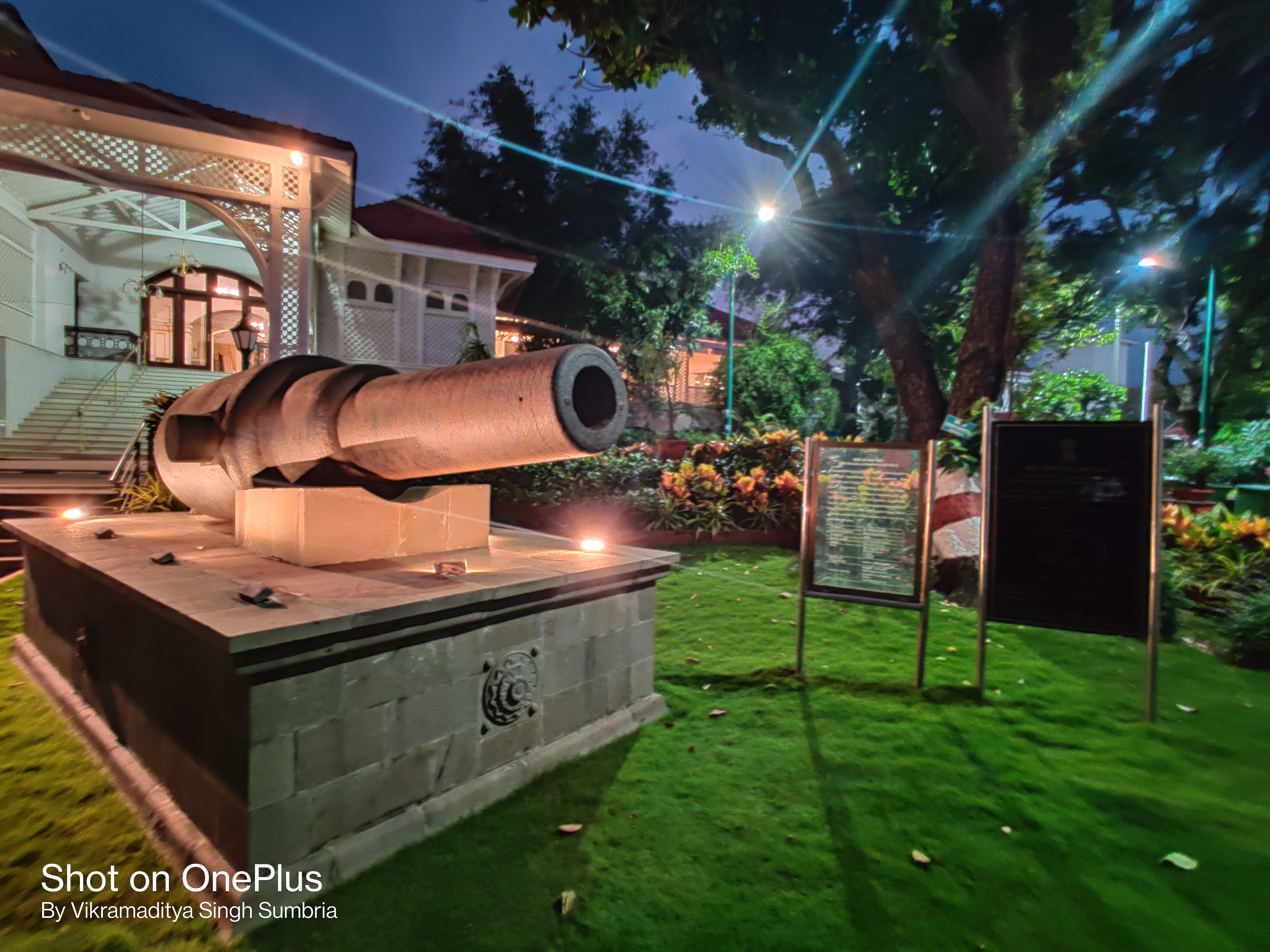
RML 10 inch Coastal Defence guns outside Ball Room.

== See also ==
- Government Houses of the British Indian Empire
