= Raja Mohan =

Indian foreign policy analyst

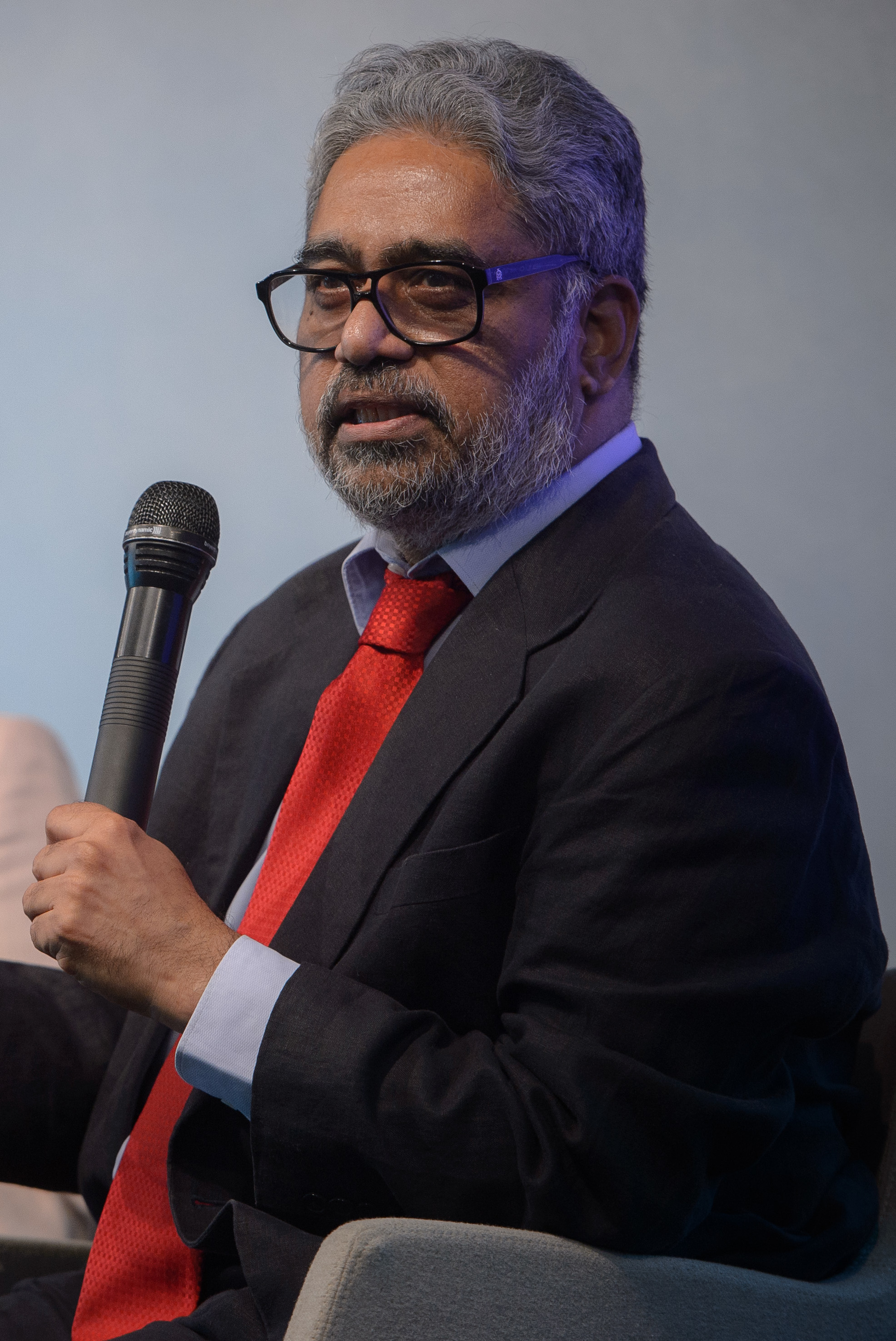
- Raja Mohan in 2016

Academic background
- Education: JNU, New Delhi; Andhra University

Chilamkuri Raja Mohan is an academic and foreign policy analyst. He is the Director of the Institute of South Asian Studies, National University of Singapore. Previously, he was the founding Director of Carnegie India. He has also been a Distinguished Fellow at the Observer Research Foundation, New Delhi and Senior Fellow at the Centre for Policy Research, New Delhi, and prior to that, a professor at the S. Rajaratnam School of International Studies, Nanyang Technological University, Singapore and Professor of Centre for South, Central, Southeast Asian and Southwest Pacific Studies, School of International Studies at Jawaharlal Nehru University, New Delhi, India. He was the Henry Alfred Kissinger Scholar in the John W. Kluge Center at the Library of Congress, Washington, D.C. during 2009-10.

== Career ==
Raja Mohan began his academic career at the Institute for Defence Studies and Analyses, New Delhi.

Mohan has had a number of stints in journalism as well. He was Strategic Affairs Editor of the Indian Express, New Delhi, and before that, served as Diplomatic Editor and the Washington Correspondent of The Hindu newspaper. He is a columnist for the Indian Express.

His foreign policy perspective is broadly liberal and pragmatist, arguing for closer ties between India and key global powers such as the United States, Russia, and China (PRC). He has also argued for using greater economic linkages to improve India's troubled ties with Pakistan. As he stated in an opinion piece in April 2012, "For far too long, Delhi has viewed its regional policy through the prism of security without reference to the economic interests of the people. Delhi should instead focus on modernising the national security management and bring it in line with the demands of a globalising economy. Denying visas, limiting trade and blocking foreign investment from neighbours — the traditional and blunt instruments of Delhi’s national security strategy — are hopelessly out of date."

He has a master's degree in nuclear physics and a Ph.D. in international relations. Mohan was a member of India's National Security Advisory Board during 1998-2000 and 2004-06. His books include Crossing the Rubicon: The Shaping of India's Foreign Policy (New York: Palgrave, 2004) and Impossible Allies: Nuclear India, United States and the Global Order (New Delhi: India Research press, 2006). His most recent work is Samudra Manthan: Sino-Indian Rivalry in the Indo-Pacific (Washington;Carnegie Endowment for International Peace, 2012). He was awarded the highest French distinction of Chevalier de la Légion d’Honneur (Knight of the Legion of Honour) in 2016.

== Books ==
- Crossing the Rubicon: The Shaping of India’s New Foreign Policy (Palgrave, 2004)
- Impossible Allies: Nuclear India, United States and the Global Order (India Research Press, 2006)
- Power Realignments in Asia: China, India and the United States (Sage, 2009)
- Samudra Manthan: Sino-Indian Rivalry in the Indo-Pacific (Brookings Institution Press, 2012)
- Modi’s World: Expanding India's Sphere of Influence (Harper Collins India, 2015)
- India’s Naval Strategy and Asian Security (Routledge, 2016)
