= Harjinder Singh (air vice marshal) =

Air Officer in the Indian Air Force

Air Vice Marshal Harjinder Singh Bains PVSM, MBE
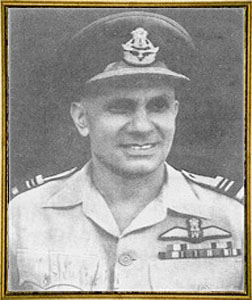
- Born: 4 February 1909; Sarhala Khurd, Hoshiarpur district, Punjab Province (British India)
- Died: 6 September 1971 (aged 62); Chandigarh
- Spouse: Beant Kaur
- Military career
- Allegiance: British India (1931–1947); India (from 1947)
- Branch: Royal Indian Air Force (1931–1947); Indian Air Force (from 1947)
- Rank: Air Vice Marshal
- Unit: No. 1 Squadron IAF
- Commands: Maintenance Command; 1 Base Repair Depot
- Conflicts: World War II; Sino-Indian War
- Awards: Param Vishisht Seva Medal; Member of the Order of the British Empire

Air Vice Marshal Harjinder Singh, PVSM, MBE (4 February 1909 – 6 September 1971) was an Air Officer in the Indian Air Force. He was one of the earliest to join the newly created Indian Air Force (IAF) in 1933 in the lowest rank of 'Hawai sepoy'. In a career spanning over three decades and two wars, he rose from the lowest enlisted rank to the then second-highest rank in the Indian Air Force. Hailed as technical wizard and innovator, he is considered a legend of the IAF.

Born in Village Sarhala Khurd, Hoshiarpur district of Punjab Province, Singh became an orphan at the age of 11, having lost his father and siblings to plague very early and his mother a few years later. Raised by his aunt in Jalandhar, he joined the MacLagan Engineering College, Lahore at the age of 17. Graduating five years later, he left a potentially comfortable life as a graduate engineer in civil service and joined the Royal Air Force (RAF) as a 'hawai sepoy'. After his apprenticeship, he joined the Indian Air Force at RAF Drigh Road. He served in the Northwest Frontier Province during the Waziristan campaign. In World War II, he led the enlisted men as the warrant officer of No. 1 Squadron IAF in the Burma Campaign.

Singh was commissioned as a flying officer after his return from Burma. In June 1943, Singh was appointed a Member of the Order of the British Empire (MBE). He then served at RAF Station Kohat and as the Chief Technical Officer of the RAF Operational Training Unit at Peshawar. After the partition of India, he led the technical and maintenance ability of the IAF. He ensured a high serviceability of aircraft during the Indo-Pakistani War of 1947. In 1948, he was appointed Station Commander at Kanpur in the rank of Group Captain.

In April 1950, at the age of 41, Singh earned his wings after completing his flying training. In January 1955, Singh took command of the newly created Maintenance Command. He would be at the helm of the command for about nine years, until his retirement. In 1958, the post was upgraded to air commodore, and in 1959, to air vice marshal. During this stint, he designed and built a light communication aircraft which he test-flew, he launched the first Indian-built jet engine and manufactured the Hawker Siddeley HS 748 aircraft at Kanpur.

He had many firsts to his credit - the first Indian corporal, the first Indian sergeant, the first Indian warrant officer, the first Indian engineering commissioned officer and the first Indian to be awarded the MBE in the IAF.

== Early life and education ==
Singh was born on 4 February 1909 in a Bains Jat Sikh family in Sirhala Khurd village in Hoshiarpur district of Punjab Province now his village lies in Sub tehsil of Mahilpur, tehsil Garhshankar district hoshiarpur of modern Punjab. The youngest of three children, he lost his father and siblings to the plague very early. By the time he was 11, he lost his mother as well, and was raised by his paternal aunt in the village of Mahil Gaila, near Banga, Jullundur where his uncle Sampuran Singh Mahal was a zaildar. He was successful in the competitive entrance examination and joined the MacLagan Engineering College, Lahore. In his third year, he was elected secretary of the young engineers association. As secretary, he wanted to organise a visit to the RAF station. The adjutant of the unit refused saying that Indians were not allowed inside going on to communicate that Indians were racially inferior. Hurt by this, he resolved to join the Air Force and prove the officer wrong.

In 1928, the Government of India agreed to the entry of Indians to the Royal Air Force College Cranwell. The ground staff were to be trained in India and were to be selected from 'D' Class apprentices in the Indian Railways and be termed Hawai Sepoys 3rd class. The apprentices in the railways were illiterate young boys and engineering graduates were not considered for the post. Singh persisted, writing to the RAF repeatedly. The pay and stature of the post was meagre, much less than what he was paid as stipend in his final year of engineering. He also had an offer for the post of superintendent of Gujranwala Power House. In spite of this, Singh was determined to join the Air Force. In November 1930, he was selected and was asked to join in January 1931 at Karachi. Leaving a life of possible luxury as an engineer, he joined in the lowest rank of Hawai Sepoy.

== Military career ==
=== Early career ===
On 21 January 1931, Singh joined the air force at RAF Drigh Road. He trained as a fitter airframe rather than a fitter aero-engine on the advice of his senior NCO. After two years of apprenticeship, in January 1933, he was attached to the test and despatch flight at RAF Karachi where he worked and maintained a Westland Wapiti. He was among the 19 hawai sepoys of the Indian Air Force when it was formed on 1 April 1933 with the strength of one flight.

Singh was posted to Quetta in September 1933 along with four officers and one more sepoy. It was here that an accident occurred with Pilot Officers Bhupinder Singh and Amarjit Singh being killed in an air crash. On 7 February 1934, he was promoted to the acting rank of Hawai Naik, equivalent to a corporal in the RAF. In early 1935, he was a part of the first men to be promoted to the rank of Leading Aircraftman (LAC) after taking the LAC test.

In April 1936, 'A' flight moved from Karachi to Peshawar in the North-West Frontier Province (NWFP) to participate in the Waziristan campaign. The flight was attached to No. 5 Squadron RAF as its 'D' flight. In mid-1937, it moved to Miranshah where achieved record serviceability of aircraft. In July 1938, 'B' flight was formed and No. 1 Squadron IAF moved to Ambala Air Force Station. Later that year, Flying Officer Henry Runganadhan on his Wapiti won the air race at an aircraft display in Delhi against the RAF's Hawker Audaxes. As the maintenance crew of the winning aircraft, Singh was presented to the Air Officer Commanding, India Air Vice Marshal Philip Joubert de la Ferté.

=== World War II ===
With the outbreak of the war in September 1939, Singh was offered a commission in the RAF by the commander of the aircraft depot in Karachi. He declined the commission opting to stay on with the IAF noting that he did not mind remaining a NCO in the IAF all his life. On 1 November 1939, he was promoted to the rank of Hawai Havildar, equivalent to a sergeant. Eight months later, on 10 June 1940, he was promoted to the rank of Flight sergeant and appointed Station engineer of Fort Sandeman in the NWFP, commanded by Flight Lieutenant Karun Krishna Majumdar. During this stint, he was hailed as a 'Technical Wizard' by Flying Officer Baba Mehar Singh for repairing in 72 hours, an aircraft which had crash-landed.

In March 1941, the commanding officer (CO) of No. 1 Squadron, Squadron Leader Subroto Mukerjee performed an emergency landing in a village after he was caught in a dust-storm. The aircraft was damaged and was repaired by Singh in the village within two days. Mukerjee hailed Singh for repairing the aircraft even though lacking appropriate means in a meeting with British NCOs attached to the squadron in Ambala. In August 1941, the squadron converted to the Westland Lysander and Singh and his men trained on this aircraft. The Lysander had an issue with tail wheel tyres getting damaged during landing. Singh designed, fabricated and installed wooden wheels on the aircraft!

In January 1942, No. 1 Squadron under Squadron Leader KK Majumdar received orders to move to Burma. The squadron moved by train to Rangoon via Calcutta while the twelve Lysanders were to fly from Peshawar via Lahore, Delhi, Kanpur, Calcutta and Chittagong into Burma. A day before they were to fly, three aircraft crash landed on the runway. The technical crew along with their equipment were on the train. Singh, without equipment or technical crew, led the pilots and their gunners to repair the aircraft and make them flight-worthy within 36 hours. Majumdar promoted Singh to acting Warrant Officer Class I.

In February, No. 1 Squadron executed multiple bombing raids on Japanese airfield in Mae Hong Son. The Japanese retaliated with raids of their own almost every day. Singh led his team to keep the Lysanders serviceable throughout this time. After returning from Burma, the squadron moved to Secunderabad and then to Trichinopoly. In June 1942, it moved to Risalpur and converted to the Hawker Hurricane II B. In August, the CO Mukerjee and former CO Majumdar asked Singh to accept a technical commission and become an officer in the IAF.

=== Commissioned Officer ===
On 3 September 1942, Singh was commissioned as the first Indian Engineering Officer in the rank of flying officer. Two other warrant officers were commissioned in the rank of pilot officer on the same day. On 1 February 1943, he was appointed president of the Initial and Re-selection Board at the Recruits Training Centre at Walton, Lahore. In June 1943, Singh was appointed a Member of the Order of the British Empire (MBE), the first such award in the IAF. Later that year, he was featured in a propaganda film with his former CO Majumdar and in a recruitment poster along with Flying Officer A.M.O. Pring with the caption "This is Pring and this is Singh."

On 1 December, Singh embarked for England since he was selected to undertake higher technical training. He visited various establishments and manufacturing companies and during his visit. In June 1944, he returned to India and was posted to the IAF Base Kohat. In February 1945, Majumdar was leading a display flight which was performing in Walton, Lahore. Singh was present and saw Majumdar crash during a dive. Singh later wrote the obituary of his friend and mentor that a part of him died that day. After an 18-month stint at Kohat, Singh was promoted to the rank of squadron leader and appointed chief technical officer of the RAF Operational Training Unit at Peshawar. He had Indian as well as British airmen under him. In early 1947, he moved to Air headquarters having been appointed Head of Technical training in the rank of wing commander.

=== Post-Independence ===
After the partition of India, majority of the technical equipment as well as the repair depots were in Pakistan. Singh went about building maintenance and technical know-how in India. During the Indo-Pakistani War of 1947, he reorganised the entire maintenance cover and ensured high serviceability. He also trained at the Delhi Flying Club and obtained a commercial pilot license. He then flew his personal civilian aircraft into Kashmir and hopped from base to base on the small aircraft.

On 9 August 1948, Singh was promoted to the rank of Group Captain and was appointed Station commander at Kanpur. Here, he led the team to work on 100 damaged Consolidated B-24 Liberator aircraft, in conjunction with the Hindustan Aircraft Limited (HAL) in Bangalore. With these aircraft, the No. 5 Squadron IAF was raised on 2 November 1948. While he flew civilian and military aircraft, he was still not a qualified IAF pilot. Starting late-1949, he trained at the Air Force Academy at Ambala.

On 15 April 1950, Singh earned his 'wings' at the age of 41 when most trained pilots restrict their flying. Squadron leader ED Massilamani, his Senior administrative officer and a qualified flying instructor (QFI), assisted him in the advanced flying stage. In 1951, the Chief of the Air Staff (CAS) Air Marshal Sir Ronald Ivelaw-Chapman offered Singh the position of Chairman of HAL with a promotion to the rank of air commodore. Singh declined the offer opting to stay in the IAF. On 26 January 1955, the Maintenance Command was established at Kanpur with Singh at the helm.

=== Air rank ===
On 24 March 1958, Singh was promoted to the rank of air commodore and with his air rank, the appointment was re-designated air officer commanding (AOC) Maintenance Command. During this time, the IAF and the Indian Airlines Corporation (IAC) were looking for a replacement for the Douglas C-47 Skytrain. The three aircraft in the fray were the Hawker Siddeley HS 748, the Fokker F27 Friendship and the Lockheed CL-49. In 1959, he led a team to the United Kingdom to select an aircraft to be manufactured in India. The Hawker Siddeley HS 748 was ultimately selected. On 15 May 1959, he received an out-of-turn promotion to the rank of air vice marshal and was re-designated Air Officer Commanding-in-Chief (AOC-in-C). Singh led his command in designing and building a four-seater light communication aircraft christened 'Kanpur-I'. He acted as the test pilot as well, flying the aircraft himself.

Air Vice Marshal Cecil Bouchier, IAF's first Commanding Officer, about Singh's career

"Yours must be one of the most romantic careers of any man in any service in the world."

—

In April 1961, the Maintenance Command under Singh launched the first jet engine built in India. Later that year, in November, the first HS 748 aircraft christened 'Subroto' was assembled and later dedicated to the nation by the Prime Minister Jawaharlal Nehru. On 26 January 1962, he was awarded the Param Vishisht Seva Medal (then called Vishisht Seva Medal, Class I) for distinguished service of the highest order.

Singh retired from the IAF on 4 November 1963 after 32 years in service. He was offered the position of Controller General Aircraft Production by the CAS Air Marshal Aspy Engineer. He was also offered an extension in service which he declined. Learning that Singh planned to settle down in Chandigarh after his retirement, the Prime Minister wrote to the Chief Minister of Punjab Partap Singh Kairon that he had a very high opinion of Singh and that he did not want him to retire from government service.

== Personal life ==
Singh married Beant Kaur on 31 May 1934. Beant was born on 9 April 1917 in Lyallpur (now in Pakistan). She completed her matriculation from Lyallpur Khalsa College. After marrying Harjinder, she developed an interest in flying as well and in 1952, became the first Indian woman to hold a private pilot's license. After Singh's retirement, the couple settled down in Chandigarh, where she would fly almost every day. The couple did not have children of their own. They adopted Beant's sister's son, Manmohan. Manmohan joined the Indian Army and retired as a colonel.

== Later years ==
After retiring, Singh served in many advisory positions with governments as well as large companies. He was an advisor to General Electric, Himalayan Helicopters and Avro Atlantic. He also served as an advisor to the Government of Punjab for multiple departments - technical education, industrial training, general education, civil aviation and child protection.

== Death and legacy ==
In September 1971, while giving a speech at the DAV College, Chandigarh, Singh suffered a heart attack and died aged 62. His coffin was carried by multiple serving air officers of the IAF. Singh is regarded as an engineering genius and a visionary who was ahead of his time. He was considered to be technical wizard and an innovator. Today, he is regarded a legend of the Indian Air Force. He was considered to be the "blue-eyed boy" of the Defence Minister V. K. Krishna Menon. With the manufacturing of the HS 748 aircraft at the Maintenance Command in Kanpur under the direction of Singh, Chief of Air Staff Air Chief Marshal Pratap Chandra Lal noted that the "HS" could well stand for "Harjinder Singh" as for "Hawker Siddeley." Harjinder Nagar near the Air Force Station in Chakeri, Kanpur is named for him. In 1976, the village Sarhala Khurd, district Hoshiarpur where he was born paid tribute to him by building a memorial gate named after him.

== Awards and decorations ==

Param Vishisht Seva Medal	Indian Independence Medal	Member of the Order of the British Empire	India General Service Medal
1939–1945 Star	Burma Star	War Medal 1939–1945	India Service Medal

== Dates of rank ==
Insignia	Rank	Component	Date of rank
No insignia	Hawai Sepoy	Royal Air Force	21 January 1931
No insignia	Hawai Sepoy	Royal Indian Air Force	1 April 1933
	Leading aircraftman	Royal Indian Air Force	January 1935
	Hawai Naik (Corporal)	Royal Indian Air Force	7 February 1934 (acting)
	Hawai Havildar (Sergeant)	Royal Indian Air Force	1 November 1939
	Flight sergeant	Royal Indian Air Force	10 June 1940
	Warrant Officer Class I	Royal Indian Air Force	January 1942 (acting); November 1942 (substantive)
	Flying Officer	Royal Indian Air Force	3 September 1942
	Flight Lieutenant	Indian Air Force	1 April 1949 (substantive)
	Squadron Leader	Indian Air Force	15 August 1949 (substantive)
	Wing Commander	Indian Air Force	January 1947 (acting)
	Group Captain	Indian Air Force	14 August 1948 (acting)
	Wing Commander	Indian Air Force	26 January 1950 (recommissioning and change in insignia); 1 October 1951 (substantive)
	Group Captain	Indian Air Force	1 October 1955
	Air Commodore	Indian Air Force	24 March 1958 (acting); 10 October 1958
	Air Vice Marshal	Indian Air Force	15 May 1959 (acting); 10 December 1961 (substantive)

== Bibliography ==
- Edwards, Mike (2016), Spitfire Singh: A True Life of Relentless Adventure, Bloomsbury Publishing India, ISBN 978-9384898670
- Sharma, G.K. (1997), Nationalisation of the Indian Army 1885–1947, Allied Publishers Pvt Ltd, ISBN 978-8170235552
- Sapru, Somnath (2014), Combat Lore: Indian Air Force 1930-1945, KW Publishers Pvt Ltd, ISBN 978-9383649259
- Lal, P.C. (1986), My years with the IAF, Lancer Publishers, ISBN 8170620082

Military offices
New title New command	Air Officer Commanding-in-Chief Maintenance Command; 1955–1963	Succeeded by Om Prakash Mehra
New title New unit	Commanding officer, No. 1 Base Repair Depot; 1948–1955	Succeeded by N P Nair
