= Hrushikesh Moolgavkar =

Indian Air Chief Marshal (1920–2015)

Air Chief Marshal H Moolgavkar PVSM, MVC
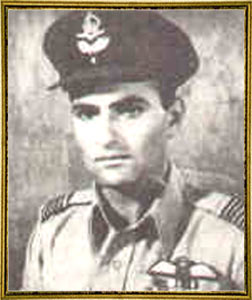
- ACM Moolgavkar (pictured wearing Group Captain's insignia c. 1952)
- Born: 15 August 1920; Bombay, Bombay Presidency, British India
- Died: 9 April 2015 (aged 94); Pune, Maharashtra, India
- Military career
- Allegiance: British India (1940–1947); India (from 1947)
- Branch: Royal Indian Air Force; Indian Air Force
- Service years: 1940-1978
- Rank: Air Chief Marshal
- Commands: Chief of the Air Staff (1976–1978); Western Air Command; No.1 Operations Wing; No. 10 Squadron IAF; No. 6 Squadron RIAF
- Conflicts: World War II; Indo-Pakistani War of 1947–1948; Indo-Pakistani War of 1965
- Awards: Param Vishist Seva Medal; Maha Vir Chakra; Legion of Merit

Air Chief Marshal Hrushikesh Moolgavkar, PVSM, MVC (15 August 1920 – 9 April 2015) was a former Indian Air officer in the Indian Air Force. He served as the 9th Chief of the Air Staff of the Indian Air Force from 1 February 1976 to 31 August 1978.

== Early life and education ==
Moolgavkar was born on 14 August 1920 to Chandraseniya Kayastha Prabhu family in Bombay. He attended the St. Mary's School, Mumbai and the St. Xavier's College, Mumbai. Moving to the United Kingdom for higher education, he attended the Malvern College. He was studying there when World War II broke out.

== Military career ==
=== Early career ===
Moolgavkar was commissioned into the Indian Air Force as an acting Pilot Officer on 30 November 1940. He joined the No. 1 Squadron IAF, commanded by Squadron Leader Karun Krishna Majumdar, at Peshawar. He flew the Hawker Hart and the Westland Lysander aircraft. In early 1942, the squadron moved to Burma where he saw active service. In May 1942, he was promoted to the rank of flying officer. After the operations in Burma, he came back with the squadron to Secunderabad where Squadron Leader Subroto Mukerjee took command. The squadron then moved to Trichy and to RAF Station Kohat.

On 1 April 1944, Moolgavkar was promoted to the acting rank of Flight Lieutenant and transferred to No. 4 Squadron IAF, commanded by Squadron Leader Geoffrey Sharp of the Royal Air Force, at Chittagong. He flew the Supermarine Spitfire in escort fighter role in supply dropping missions. In January 1945, while on a sortie, the engine of his Spitfire failed. He crash landed on a beach and was stuck upside-down. Luckily, a couple of British Commandos spotted the plane and rescued him. He had multiple crushed vertebrae which required surgery and he spent about six months with his back in plaster. He got back to flying soon, joining the No. 10 Squadron IAF.

In January 1947, Moolgavkar was promoted to the acting rank of Squadron Leader and took command of No. 6 Squadron RIAF at Kohat. After a short stint, he took command of No. 10 Squadron at Kanpur. The squadron was equipped with the Hawker Tempest II.

=== Post-Independence ===
During the partition of India, he was commanding the squadron at Kanpur. He was in command till February 1948. In April, he attended the first course at the Defence Services Staff College in Wellington. The college had relocated from Quetta after the partition of India. After completing the staff course, he took command of No. 1 Operational Wing at Srinagar from Wing Commander Minoo Merwan Engineer.

=== Maha Vir Chakra ===
The No. 1 Operational Wing was in the thick of battle during the Indo-Pakistani War of 1947. Moolgavkar led the planning and execution of close air support during Operation Bison in Zoji La. He also flew sorties himself. For his exceptional gallantry and leadership, Moolgavkar was decorated with the Maha Vir Chakra (MVC), the second highest military decoration in India. He was among four IAF officers who were awarded the MVC during the war, the other three being Air Commodore Mehar Singh and Wing Commanders Minoo Merwan Engineer and Sidney Basil Noronha. The citation for the Maha Vir Chakra reads as follows:

Gazette Notification: 59 Pres/51,1.12.51

Operation: 1947 Indo Pak Kashmir War Date of Award: 08 Dec 1951

CITATION

WING COMMANDER HRUSHIKESH MOOLGAVKAR

(1644) GD(P)

Wing Commander Moolgavkar commanded No. 1 Operational Wing of the IAF in Kashmir from September 1948 to May 1949. In spite of having to plan out as well as conduct operations from both Jammu and Srinagar, this officer made time to take the air whenever the more difficult and dangerous commitments had to be carried out.

In these tasks, he showed great leadership by his selfless devotion to duty and fearless readiness for offensive action against the enemy, this leader inspired great confidence in his Squadron Commanders and pilots.

The air attack on the well defended Domel bridge and the Uri and Saadabad sectors was led and directed by Wing Commander Moolgavkar personally. When the defences around Uri presented severe obstacles in the way of operational flight on that area, he evolved a plan and attacked the Uri guns in conjunction with one of his Squadron Commanders. This attack not only exposed them to the fire of the anti-aircraft guns but also brought him within the dangerous probability of their aircraft entering the “Compressibility Zones” with a risky load of bombs at high altitudes.

The final link-ups with Poonch, Kargil and Leh were established during the period he was in command of No. 1 Operational Wing. The effective support that the IAF was able to render the Army during these operations was in no small measures due to his determination, initiative and drive in planning and co-ordinating the offensive to success.

=== Post-war career ===
After the war, in March 1950, he commanded a detachment of de Havilland Vampire aircraft, which were recently received by the IAF. He led the detachment touring South India and in flying demonstrations in Bombay, Poona, Bangalore and Madras. In October 1950, he moved to Air headquarters as Deputy Director Operations. He was promoted to the acting rank of group captain and appointed director of operations at Air HQ in May 1952. He became the first IAF officer to serve in this appointment, since the previous officers were from the RAF. After a two-year stint at Air HQ, he took command of Palam Air Force Station from Group Captain H N Chatterjee.

In October 1954, he was a part of a team of three, consisting of air commodore (later air chief marshal) Pratap Chandra Lal and Flight Lieutenant (later air commodore) Roshan Lal Suri, which went to Europe to select new aircraft for the IAF. The team rejected the Supermarine Swift, and chose the Folland Gnat, a decision which would hold India and the IAF in good stead during the Indo-Pakistani War of 1965. During this tour, he became among the first Indians to break the sound barrier. He was promoted substantive group captain on 1 April 1955. The 3 Wing at Palam had No. 7 Squadron and No. 10 Squadron under it, which were equipped with the Vampires. After a four-year stint at Palam, he served in a staff appointment at the Operational Command (later Western Air Command). In early 1959, Moolgavkar was appointed Air advisor to the High Commissioner of India to the United Kingdom was Vijaya Lakshmi Pandit at India House, London.

=== Air rank ===
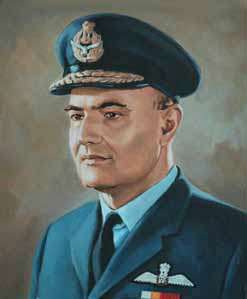
Moolgavkar as the commandant, National Defence College

Moolgavkar was promoted to the acting rank of air commodore and returned to India. He subsequently took over as the senior air staff officer (SASO) of the Operational Command. In October 1962, the Hawker Siddeley HS 748 arrived in India for a tour of demonstration flights. Moolgavkar led the team for this tour. He moved to Air HQ in June 1963, where he served as the air officer-in-charge policy and plans. He was promoted substantive air commodore on 1 April 1964. He served in this appointment for a year and a half before moving to the Maintenance Command at Nagpur. He served as the senior air & administration staff officer (SAASO) of the command. Promoted to the acting rank of air vice marshal on 25 January 1967, he took command of the newly created HQ Western India at Pune. He was made substantive air vice marshal on 1 April 1968 and appointed air officer commanding-in-chief (AOC-in-C) Central Air Command at Allahabad. He was at the helm of the Central Air Command for three years, till March 1971.

On 1 April 1971, he was promoted to the acting rank of air marshal and appointed Commandant of the National Defence College in New Delhi. He assumed the office from Vice Admiral Sourendra Nath Kohli who was appointed the flag officer commanding-in-chief (FOC-in-C) Western Naval Command. He was promoted substantive air marshal in June 1972.

After a two-year stint at the helm of the NDC, in 1973, he took command of the Western Air Command, the biggest command in terms of resource, as its AOC-in-C. In March 1975, Moolgavkar personally participated in the Western Air Command Inter-Squadron Gunnery Meet. He won the Staff Pilots Championship Trophy for firing rockets from a single-seater Hunter aircraft. As the commander-in-chief of the command, and at the age of 55, he was the envy of many younger pilots. In April, he took over as the commodore commandant of the squadron that he had commanded in the past - No. 10 Squadron.

=== Chief of Air Staff ===
In January 1976, the Government of India appointed Moolgavkar to be the next chief of the air staff (CAS), succeeding Air Chief Marshal Om Prakash Mehra. He was promoted to the rank of air chief marshal took over as the 9th CAS on 31 January. Soon after taking over as Chief, Moolgavkar and the chief of the naval staff Admiral Jal Cursetji discussed about the handing over of the maritime reconnaissance role from the Indian Air Force to the Indian Navy. In accordance with this, the Lockheed L-1049 Super Constellation aircraft of the No. 6 Squadron IAF were transferred to the Navy. On 8 October 1976, the INAS 312 was commissioned at Goa.

== Dates of rank ==
Insignia	Rank	Component	Date of rank
	Pilot Officer	Royal Indian Air Force	30 November 1940
	Flying Officer	Royal Indian Air Force	30 May 1942
	Flight Lieutenant	Indian Air Force	1 April 1944 (acting); 25 February 1947 (substantive)
	Squadron Leader	Indian Air Force	16 January 1947 (acting); 15 August 1948 (substantive)
	Squadron Leader	Indian Air Force	26 January 1950 (recommissioning and change in insignia)
	Wing Commander	Indian Air Force	1 March 1951
	Group Captain	Indian Air Force	17 May 1952 (acting); 1 April 1955 (substantive)
	Air Commodore	Indian Air Force	12 June 1962 (acting); 1 April 1964 (substantive)
	Air Vice Marshal	Indian Air Force	25 January 1967 (acting); 1 April 1968 (substantive)
	Air Marshal	Indian Air Force	1 April 1971 (acting); 26 June 1972 (substantive)
	Air Chief Marshal (CAS)	Indian Air Force	1 February 1976

== Personal life and death ==
The Moolgavkars had two children - a son Dr. Prakash and a daughter Jyoti. Jyoti later wrote the biography of the former CAS titled Leading from the Cockpit: A Fighter Pilot’s Story. The book was published and released in 2010.

== See also ==
- National Defence College
- Commandant of the National Defence College

== Bibliography ==
- Lal, P.C. (1986), My years with the IAF, Lancer Publishers, ISBN 8170620082
- Hiranandani, G.M. (1999), Transition to Triumph: History of the Indian Navy, 1965-1975, Spantech & Lancer, ISBN 978-1897829721

Military offices
Preceded by M A Rahman	Commanding officer No. 10 Squadron IAF; 1947–1948	Succeeded by Z A Shah
Preceded by H N Chatterjee	Station Commander Air Force Station Palam; 1954–1958	Succeeded by B S Krishnarao
Preceded by Hari Chand Dewan	Air Officer Commanding-in-Chief Central Air Command; 1968–1971	Succeeded by Maurice Barker
Preceded by Vice Admiral Sourendra Nath Kohli	Commandant of the National Defence College; 1971–1973	Succeeded by Lieutenant General M M Khanna
Preceded by Minoo Merwan Engineer	Air Officer Commanding-in-Chief Western Air Command; 1973–1976	Succeeded by E J Dhatigara
Preceded by Om Prakash Mehra	Chief of the Air Staff; 1976–1978	Succeeded by Idris Latif
Preceded by General Tapishwar Narain Raina	Chairman of the Chiefs of Staff Committee; 1978–1978	Succeeded by Admiral Jal Cursetji
