= Narendra (IAF officer) =

Indian Air Force officer

Air Commodore Narendra
- Born: 1 November 1912; Fatehpur, United Provinces of Agra and Oudh, British India
- Died: 6 October 1951 (aged 38); Gülnar, Turkey
- Military career
- Allegiance: British India (1933-1947); India (from 1947)
- Branch: Royal Indian Air Force (1933-1947); Indian Air Force (1947-1951)
- Service years: 1933 – 1951
- Rank: Air Commodore
- Unit: No. 1 Squadron IAF
- Commands: No.2 Training Group; RAF Base Kohat
- Conflicts: World War II; Indo-Pakistani War of 1947–1948

Air Commodore Narendra was an officer of the Indian Air Force (IAF). One of the pioneers of the IAF, he last served as the Air Officer-in-charge Technical and Equipment Services at Air HQ. He was killed when his Dakota aircraft crashed near Gülnar in Southern Turkey. At the time of his death, he was the third senior-most officer of the IAF, after Air Marshals Subroto Mukerjee and Aspy Engineer.

== Early life and education ==
Narendra was born in Fatehpur in the United Provinces of Agra and Oudh on 1 November 1912. He attended the University of Allahabad. While he was a student, he received an 'A' flying license from the Karachi flying club. He was part of the third batch of Indian pilots sent to RAF College Cranwell in early 1932; Karun Krishna Majumdar was one of the other two in the batch.

== Military career ==
Narendra was commissioned on 16 December 1933 as a pilot officer. After completing his training at Cranwell, he received further training at the Army Cooperation School at Old Sarum Airfield in Wiltshire. He returned to India and joined No. 1 Squadron IAF. In 1936, a rebellion erupted in North-West Frontier Province (NWFP), led by the Pukhtoon tribes. The Indian Air Force were forced to play a major role in containing the rebellion, due to the harsh terrain of the region. He served with the squadron during the air operations in the NWFP.

In September 1941, Narendra was posted to the Initial Training Centre at Walton, Lahore. Later that year, he volunteered to join the 50th Parachute Brigade. He became the first regular Air Force officer to qualify as a paratrooper. He subsequently served on the air staff of No. 224 Group RAF. The group was based out of Kolkata, and later at Chittagong. He was then posted to the Bengal Command, where he had aerodrome inspection duties and was responsible for the building of forward landing grounds in East Bengal and Assam Province.

In October 1943, Narendra became the Air Force representative on the Directorate of Selection of Personnel. On 12 May 1944, he was appointed the Officer-in-charge flying training and frontier air operations at RAF Base Kohat. He assumed command of the base later that year. In 1945, he was appointed Commandant of the Indian Air Training Corps. After the war, he took command of the Royal Indian Air Force Depot in Arakkonam.

On 14 May 1947, he was promoted to the acting rank of group captain and was appointed Senior Officer-in-charge of Administration at No. 2 Indian Group headquarters at Bangalore. He was promoted to the rank along with Wing Commander Mehar Singh.

=== Post-Independence ===
On 4 November 1947, Narendra was promoted to the acting rank of air commodore, the third Indian to hold the rank, after Subroto Mukerjee and Aspy Engineer. He was appointed the Air Officer Commanding No. 2 Training Group, the precursor to Training Command. The group comprised the majority of the ground training schools and all units of the RIAF in Southern India.

After a year-long tenure, he was appointed Air Officer-in-Charge Technical and Supply services at Air headquarters. One of the three Principal Staff Officers (PSO) at Air HQ, he had the directorates of Equipment and Technical services under him. The directorates were responsible for the procurement, maintenance and servicing of all aircraft of the RIAF. On 1 February 1949, the appointment was renamed to Air Officer-in-Charge Technical and Equipment Services. On 1 October 1951, he was made substantive air commodore.

== Death ==
Narendra was flying a Dakota No. HJ-920 from England to India. While flying over the Mediterranean between Malta and Cyprus, the aircraft encountered adverse weather conditions over Cyprus. An emergency landing at Nicosia was not possible because of poor visibility. The aircraft lost its way in the fog and crashed near Gulnar in the Mersin province in southern Turkey, resulting in the death of all five crew. Along with Narendra were Flying Officer P. V. Phillipose, Flying Officer Sunil Kumar Ghosh, Sergeant B. S. Gill and Sergeant D'Souza.

The remains of Narendra, Ghosh and Gill were cremated with full military honours by the Gendarmarie at Gulnar. Phillipose and D'Souza were buried at the cemetery in Mersin by the Turkish Army.The Indian ambassador to Turkey, C. S. Jha, the governor and mayor of Mersin, the military attache and officials from the Indian embassy in Ankara, foreign consuls and officers and men of the Turkish Armed Forces paid tribute.

== Personal life ==
Narendra married Devinderbir Kaur Sahiba, the daughter of Ranbir Singh Jind, the Maharaja of Jind State. The couple had a daughter. A son was born a few months after Narendra's death. His brothers-in-law, husbands of his wife's sisters, were Air Commodores R. H. D. Singh and J. C. Verma.

== See also ==
- List of accidents and incidents involving military aircraft (1950–1954)

Military offices
Preceded by Cyril Douglas Adams	Air Officer Commanding No. 2 Training Group; 1947–1948	Succeeded by R. H. D. Singh
New title First holder	Air Officer-in-Charge Technical & Equipment Services; 1949–1951	Succeeded by Aspy Engineer
