= Aspy Engineer =

Indian air marshal and diplomat

Air Marshal A M Engineer DFC
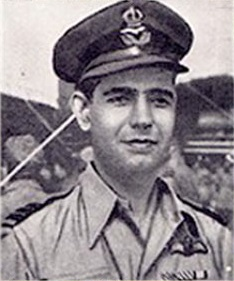
- Air Marshal Aspy Merwan Engineer

6th Ambassador of India to Iran
- In office 6 December 1964 – 6 December 1966
- Preceded by: M. R. A. Baig
- Succeeded by: K. V. Padmanabhan

9th Chairman of the Chiefs of Staff Committee
- In office 4 June 1962 – 24 July 1964
- President: Sir S. Radhakrishnan
- Prime Minister: Jawaharlal Nehru; Gulzarilal Nanda (acting)
- Preceded by: Ram Dass Katari
- Succeeded by: Bhaskar Sadashiv Soman

5th Chief of Air Staff
- In office 1 December 1960 – 31 July 1964
- President: Rajendra Prasad
- Prime Minister: Jawaharlal Nehru
- Preceded by: Subroto Mukerjee
- Succeeded by: Arjan Singh

Personal details
- Born: 15 December 1912 Lahore, Punjab Province, British India
- Died: 1 May 2002 (aged 89) Mumbai, Maharashtra, India
- Relations: Minoo Merwan Engineer (brother)
- Education: RAF Cranwell
- Awards: Distinguished Flying Cross
- Later work(s): Founder, California Zoroastrian Center

Military service
- Allegiance: British India (1933–1947); India (1947–1964)
- Branch/service: Royal Indian Air Force; Indian Air Force
- Years of service: 1933–1964
- Rank: Air Marshal
- Unit: No. 1 Squadron IAF
- Commands: No.1 Operational Group; Air Force Station Kohat; No.2 Squadron
- Battles/wars: Waziristan Campaign; Indo-Pakistani War of 1947; Annexation of Goa; Sino-Indian War

Air Marshal Aspy Merwan Engineer DFC (15 December 1912 – 1 May 2002) was an officer in the Indian Air Force who rose through the ranks to become independent India's second Chief of the Air Staff, succeeding Subroto Mukerjee in 1960 and preceding Arjan Singh.

His flying career began in 1930 at the age of 17, when as a co-pilot he accompanied his friend R. N. Chawla to Croydon Airport, London from Karachi in British India, by flight and were the first Indians to do so. Shortly afterwards, he won the Aga Khan contest for being the first Indian to fly the journey between England and India, solo and within a one-month time frame.

Engineer subsequently joined the Indian Air Force, trained at RAF Cranwell, saw action on the North Western Frontier Provinces (NWFP) and at Burma and as a result was awarded the Distinguished Flying Cross (DFC). By the end of the Second World War he became Wing Commander.

Following retirement, he served as India's ambassador to Iran and later spent time living in California, before his last days in Mumbai.

== Early life ==
Aspy Engineer was born Aspy Merwan Irani on 15 December 1912 in Lahore, Punjab Province, British India, to Meherwan Irani and Maneckbai. Meherwan was a Divisional Engineer for the North Western Railway. His interest in mechanics led his friends to rename him Engineer. Aspy was the eldest amongst eight siblings – two girls and six boys. His brothers, Minoo, Jungoo and Ronnie, also joined the Indian Air Force, while another brother, Homi, joined the Indian Army. Aspy, Minoo and Ronnie were recipients of the DFC, a unique feat where three brothers were decorated with gallantry awards.

At the age of seven, Engineer witnessed aviators Alcock and Brown make an emergency aircraft landing on the Race Course grounds opposite his father's railway bungalow in Hyderabad, Sindh. He later recounted, "I dreamt of nothing else thereafter but aircraft landing on the roof-top of our spacious bungalow."

He completed his early education from the Billimoria Parsi School, Panchgani, and the DJ Science College in Karachi. On his 17th birthday, his father presented him with a second-hand de Havilland Gipsy Moth and after less than three months of lessons, he obtained his license to fly from the Karachi Aero Club.

== Aga Khan contest ==
In November 1929, the Aga Khan, 48th Imam of the Ismailai sect of Muslims announced a prize of £500 to the first Indian who could fly solo between England and India within a one-month time-frame.

Shortly after the announcement, Engineer as co-pilot and his friend R. N. Chawla set on a flight to England in March 1930, at a time lacking radio communications or air traffic control. On 21 March 1930, they flew into Croydon Airport where the Lord Mayor of London and the press greeted them with garlands.

The other contestants included; J. R. D. Tata, who later founded Tata Motors and Air India, and another Bristol trained pilot, Man Mohan Singh. Engineer left Croydon on 25 April 1930, crossing paths with Tata in Cairo. Tata gave Engineer the spare much needed spark plug which allowed Engineer to complete the journey from Croydon Airport, England, to RAF Drigh Road, Karachi, now in Pakistan, in his Gipsy Moth and was awarded the prize, winning over Man Mohan Singh by one day.

In response, Sir Frederick Sykes, Governor of Bombay, arranged for a public reception at Bombay and the Legislative Council of India awarded Engineer 10,000 rupees. However, as a result of an aircraft accident at Bhuj, he instead flew to his old school and landed on its playing field.

== Military career ==
=== Early career ===
In 1931, Engineer entered the Royal Air Force College Cranwell. At Cranwell, he was awarded the Grove's Memorial Flying prize for the best all-round pilot during his term. He was commissioned as a pilot and joined the newly formed No. 1 Squadron IAF. The No. 1 Squadron had only one flight and was then stationed in Drigh Road, Karachi. The flight was equipped with four Westland Wapiti biplanes. As part of the 'A' flight of the squadron, Engineer flew a Westland Wapiti and saw action in the Waziristan campaign (1936–1939). In 1938, for action against the tribals, he became the first IAF officer to be mentioned in dispatches. In July 1938, three flights of the No. 1 Squadron IAF were formed and Engineer took command of the flight. He was one of the three flying officers of the three flights of No. 1 Squadron, the other two being Subroto Mukerjee and Karun Krishna Majumdar.

=== World War II ===
In 1941, the No. 2 Squadron IAF was formed at Peshawar under the command of Squadron Leader A B Awan. Engineer was one among seven pilots to be deputed to form the squadron and served as the squadron adjutant. In June 1941, he was promoted to the acting rank of squadron leader and took over as the commanding officer of No. 2 Squadron. The squadron converted from Wapitis to the Hawker Audax in September, and later to the Westland Lysander, under him. Engineer led the squadron in operations in the Tochi Valley. In December 1942, Engineer was mentioned in dispatches for the second time and awarded the Distinguished Flying Cross for distinguished services in Waziristan. In late 1942, he relinquished command of No. 2 Squadron, handing over to Squadron Leader Habib Ullah Khan. He subsequently held staff appointments at Air Headquarters.

In December 1944, he was promoted to the acting rank of wing commander and took command of Air Force Station Kohat from Subroto Mukerjee. After commanding the airbase for over a year, Engineer was selected to attend the RAF Staff College, Bracknell. On his return to India in November 1946, he was promoted to the acting rank of group captain and then moved to Air HQ as the air officer-in-charge administration (AOA).

=== Post-Independence ===
On 15 August 1947, with the partition of India, a new Air Headquarters of the Dominion of India was formed. Engineer was promoted to the acting rank of air commodore and continued as AOA. After Mukerjee, he was the second air commodore to be appointed in the RIAF. The assets of the Indian Air Force (like other branches of the military) had to be divided between the Dominions of India and Pakistan. Subroto Mukerjee and Engineer led the air force part of this committee.

In September 1948, he assumed command of the No. 1 Operational Group (later rechristened Western Air Command) from Air Commodore Mehar Singh. As the air officer commanding (AOC), he led the group to support ground troops in Jammu and Kashmir during the Indo-Pakistani War of 1947. In July 1949, the group was renamed Operational Command. He was selected to attend the Imperial Defence College and embarked for the United Kingdom in late 1950. After the year-long course, he returned to India and was appointed Air Officer-in-Charge Technical & Equipment Service at Air HQ.

In 1952, Engineer took over as the Deputy Chief of the Air Staff and Deputy Air Commander, IAF. He was promoted to the rank of air vice marshal on 1 October 1954. In November 1954, he led the Air Force in a goodwill mission to Indonesia. Engineer was deputed to the Hindustan Aircraft Limited (HAL) for a period of three years in 1958. On 28 May, he took over as the General Manager of HAL. On 23 May 1959, he became the second Indian to be promoted to the rank of air marshal.

=== Chief of Air Staff ===
In November 1960, Air India inaugurated its service to Tokyo, Japan. Air Marshal Subroto Mukerjee, CAS and Air Commodore (later ACM) Pratap Chandra Lal, then General Manager of the Indian Airlines Corporation were passengers on this flight. After landing in Tokyo, on 8 November 1960, Mukerjee was having a meal in a restaurant with a friend, an officer in the Indian Navy. A piece of food got lodged in his windpipe, choking him to death before a doctor could be called for. The next day, his body was flown to Palam Airport, New Delhi.

After Mukerjee's untimely demise, Engineer was appointed the next Air Chief in late November. On 1 December 1960, he took over as the second Indian Chief of the Air Staff.

His rise to become the second Indian Chief of Air Staff inspired a generation of Parsi officers. A broader historical review of Parsi representation in the IAF, including Engineer’s role, is chronicled in this essay on community contributions to Indian military aviation.

== Awards and decorations ==

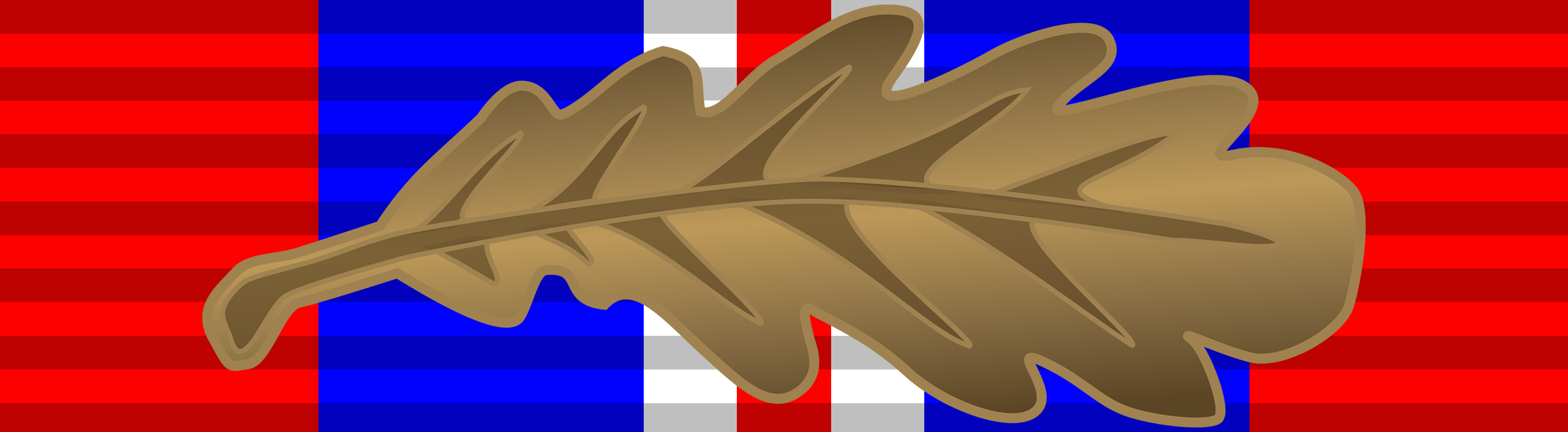

General Service Medal 1947	Indian Independence Medal		Distinguished Flying Cross
India General Service Medal	1939–1945 Star	War Medal 1939–1945 (with MID oak leaf)	India Service Medal (1945)

== Dates of rank ==
Insignia	Rank	Component	Date of rank
	Pilot Officer	Royal Indian Air Force	15 July 1933
	Flying Officer	Royal Indian Air Force	15 January 1935
	Flight Lieutenant	Royal Indian Air Force	15 January 1940
	Squadron Leader	Royal Indian Air Force	1 June 1941 (acting); 30 April 1943 (substantive)
	Wing Commander	Royal Indian Air Force	15 December 1944 (acting); 2 May 1947 (substantive)
	Group Captain	Royal Indian Air Force	2 November 1946 (acting)
	Air Commodore	Indian Air Force	15 August 1947 (acting); 15 August 1948 (substantive)
	Air Commodore	Indian Air Force	26 January 1950 (recommissioning and change in insignia)
	Air Vice Marshal	Indian Air Force	1 October 1954
	Air Marshal	Indian Air Force	23 May 1959 (acting); 1 December 1960 (substantive)

== Later life ==
He retired from the Indian Air Force on 31 July 1964, after which he served as India's ambassador to Iran. Around 1990, he moved to Southern California where he founded the California Zoroastrian Center.

== Death ==
Engineer died on 1 May 2002.

== Bibliography ==
- Rao, Prof. L. S. Seshagiri (2000), J. R. D. TATA, Sapna Book House (P) Ltd., ISBN 9788128017438
- Chowdhury, Mohindra S. (2018), Defence of Europe by Sikh Soldiers in the World Wars, Troubador Publishing Ltd, ISBN 9781788037983
- Sapru, S. (2014), Combat lore : Indian Air Force 1930-1945, KW Publishers Pvt Ltd, ISBN 978-9383649259
- Khan, J. A. (2004), Air Power And Challenges To IAF, APH Publishing Corporation, ISBN 81-7648-593-4
- Ahluwalia, A. S. (2012), Airborne to chairborne : memoirs of a war veteran aviator-lawyer of the Indian Air Force, Xlibris, ISBN 978-1469196572
- Ramunny, Murkot (1997), The sky was the limit, Northern Book Centre, ISBN 978-8172110840
- Lal, P.C. (1986), My years with the IAF, Lancer Publishers, ISBN 8170620082

Military offices
Preceded by A B Awan	Commanding officer No. 2 Squadron IAF; 1941–1942	Succeeded by Habib Ullah Khan
Preceded by Subroto Mukerjee	Commanding Officer, RAF Station Kohat; 1944–1946	Succeeded by Mehar Singh
Preceded by Mehar Singh	Air Officer Commanding No. 1 Operational Group; 1948–1950	Succeeded by Arjan Singh
Preceded by Subroto Mukerjee	Deputy Chief of the Air Staff; 1952–1958	Succeeded by Diwan Atma Ram Nanda
Preceded by Subroto Mukerjee	Chief of the Air Staff (India); 1960–1964	Succeeded by Arjan Singh
Preceded by Vice Admiral Ram Dass Katari	Chairman Chiefs of Staff Committee; 1962–1964	Succeeded by Vice Admiral Bhaskar Sadashiv Soman
Diplomatic posts
Preceded by Mirza Rashid Ali Baig	Ambassador of India to Iran; 1964–1966	Succeeded by K V Padmanabhan
