= Miranshah Airfield =

Airfield in Pakistan

Miranshah Airfield
- North Waziristan District, Khyber Pakhtunkhwa Province in Pakistan
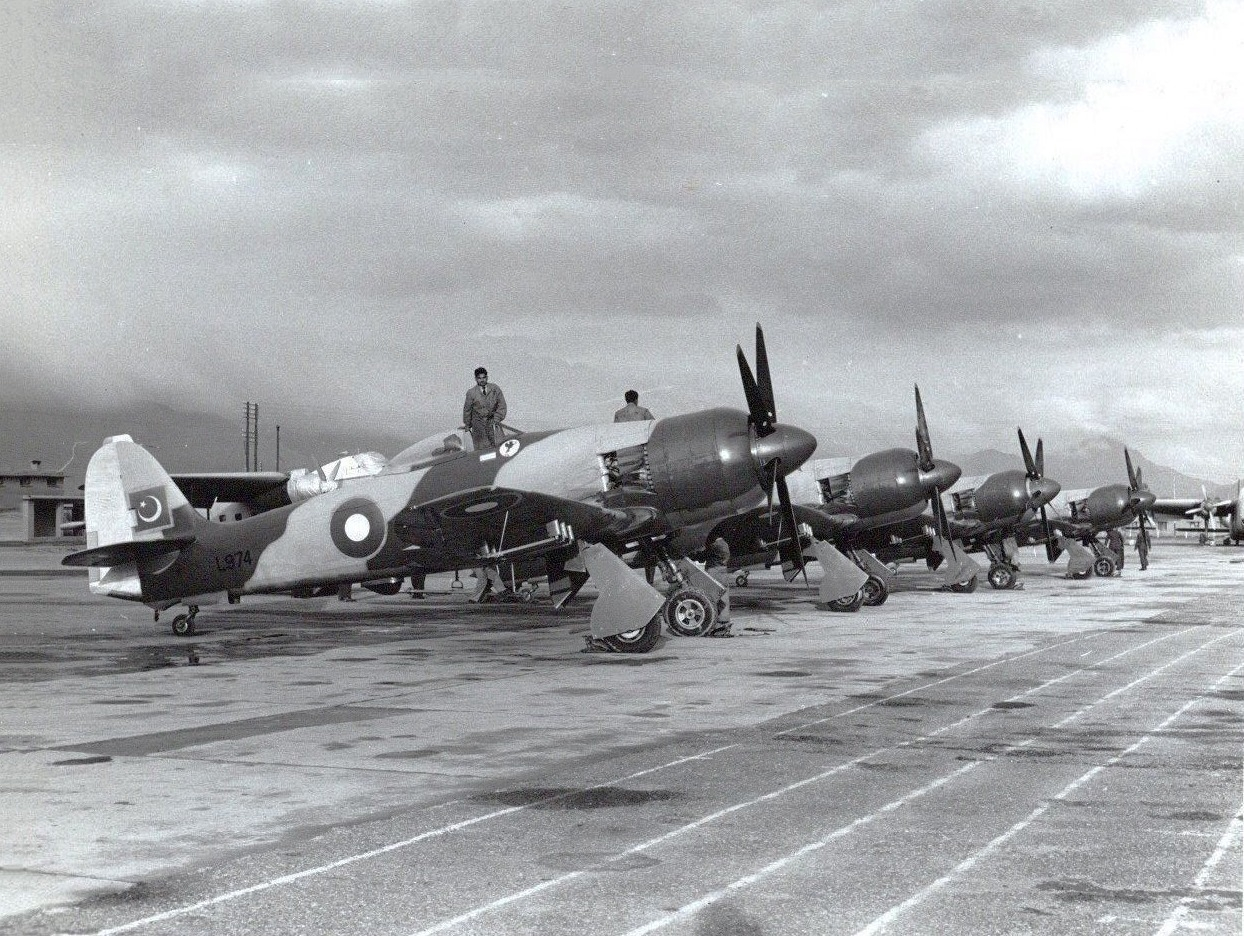
- Line up of Hawker Fury FB.50s of No. 9 Squadron at Miranshah Airbase, December 1957.

Site information
- Type: Military and civil airfield
- Owner: Ministry of Defence
- Operator: Pakistan Air Force

Location
- Shown within Pakistan Miranshah Airfield (South Asia)
- Coordinates: 33°00′49″N 70°03′55″E

Site history
- Built: 1923
- In use: 1923 - present
- Battles/wars: Pink's War

Airfield information
- Identifiers: ICAO: OPMN

Miranshah Airfield, also known as Dardoni Aerodrome (ICAO: OPMN) is a joint civil and military airfield located in North Waziristan District, Khyber Pakhtunkhwa province, Pakistan.

== History ==
In 1905, the British constructed Miranshah Fort to control North Waziristan. It was built using sun-dried mud bricks, and was occupied by the Tochi Scouts. Through the years, the fort faced tribal raids. However, in 1919, the 3rd Afghan War led to the Afghans raiding Waziristan, and tribes rose up. Following this, over 10,000 troops of Indian Army were deployed to re-establish British control. Five Royal Air Force squadrons begun strafing and bombing attacks on the tribes, operating mainly Royal Aircraft Factory B.E.2C, Bristol F.2B Fighter, de Havilland DH.9, and other DH bombers. 1,300 men were killed, and the bombings led to the conflict ending.

=== Establishment ===
Following the success, in November 1923, the British government made Miranshah a Royal Air Force Base, using the existing fort to house RAF personnel. By 1925, the north side of the Miranshah Fort was constructed along with a runway to carry out operations in Waziristan. Technical buildings were installed to accommodate and maintain the equipment of two squadrons. The buildings included hangars, store-rooms, workshops, offices, and tents to house personnel. By 1925, Miranshah was used by the RAF to conduct air operations against tribesmen, known as the Pink's War. Ever since, the RAF maintained a flight at Miranshah for operations in the Northwest frontier. On 14 April 1936, the A Flight of No. 1 (India) Wing, based in India, took over the RAF Section from No. 5 Squadron RAF's prior occupation. The unit delivered additions to the Tochi Scouts Post to accommodate the RAF, while the old Dardoni Camp was demolished. By 1937, flights were exclusively undertaken by Squadrons 5, 20, 28, 31, and 60. These squadrons remained for two months on a rotational basis, providing security over the region.

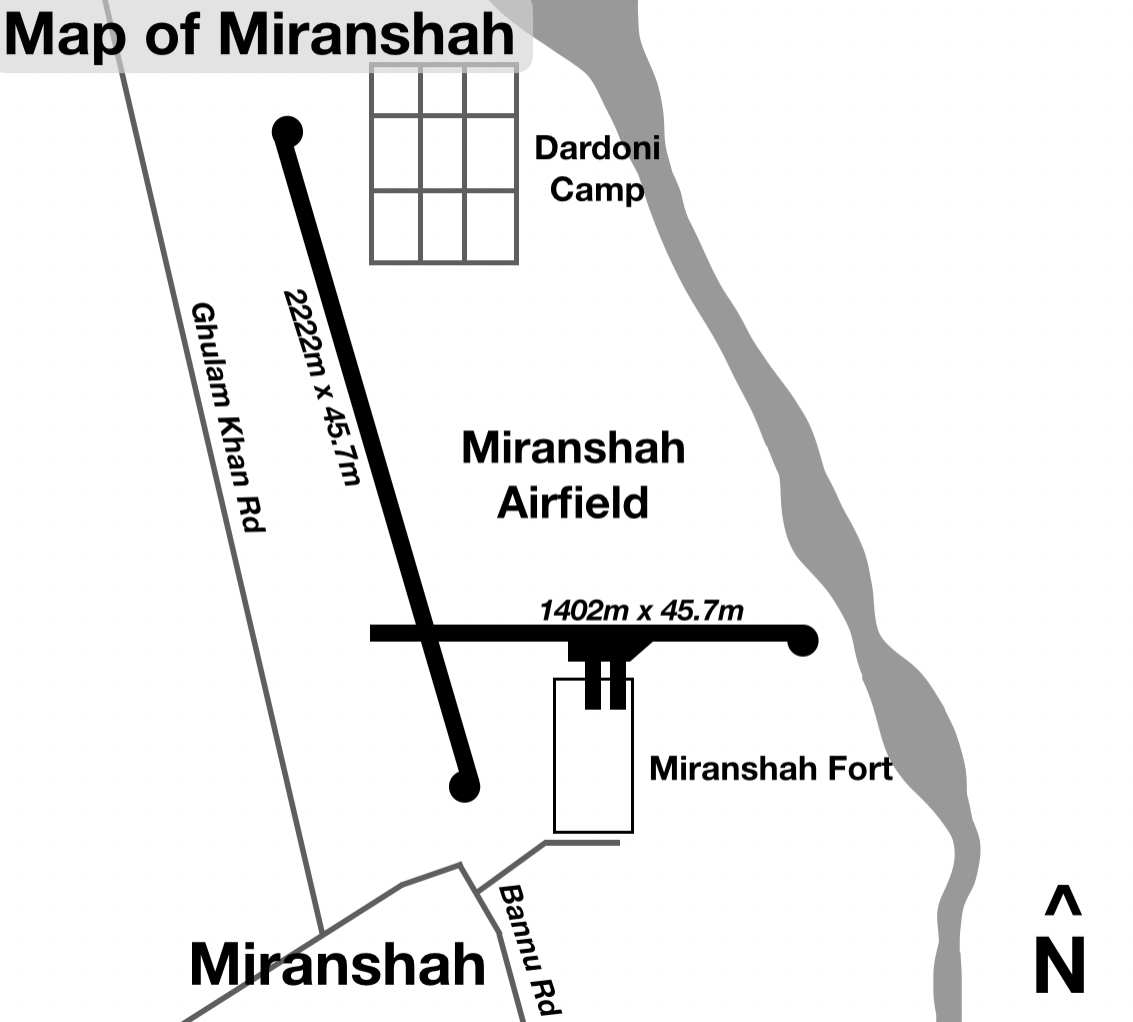
Map of Miranshah including the airfield and former camp.

The mud fort consisted of high walls, containing the headquarters, hangars, officers mess, and tented accommodation. There were guard towers equipped with powerful searchlights, and aircraft were kept within the fort. Outside the fort was an L-shaped airstrip measuring 800 yards (732 meters). When a flight took place, the door of the fort was to be opened, and an aircraft would taxi in and out to the airstrip. RAF Miranshah was also located 3,000 feet high and surrounded by hills, which made it prone to severe storms, accompanied by hail. This made flying in the area difficult and dangerous. By the 1940s, the runway located in front of the gate was replaced by a parallel runway. Miranshah Fort was also well-developed by then, undergoing continuous minor upgrades. On both sides of the fort were aircraft hangars, while the barracks were hot and windy because it was made of wood. Newer facilities within the fort included a Tochi Scouts camp, cinema, and airmens' quarters. In 1940, Miranshah was put under control of RAF Kohat, commanded by IAF officers from August 1943 to June 1947. A gunnery range was eventually established five miles away from the airfield, supporting bombing training. The marking of the range was completed by ten Khassadar tribals, supervised by Air Commodore Amrit L. Saigal. Quadrants would be placed for the marking of errors. RAF Miranshah also had its own football team, and matches would commonly be played against RAF Kohat. As the base did not have its own restaurant or bazaar, stationed personnel were able to save up their pay.

=== Dardoni Camp ===
Adjacent to the runway was the Dardoni Camp. It served as a British army installation, and the airfield was originally named after it. During 1936, the 113th Pack Battery and the 13th (Dardoni) Mountain Battery of the 25th Indian Mountain Regiment was stationed at the camp to support the ongoing North West Frontier campaign. In April 1936, the Dardoni Camp was razed following use.

=== Counter-Insurgency Operations ===
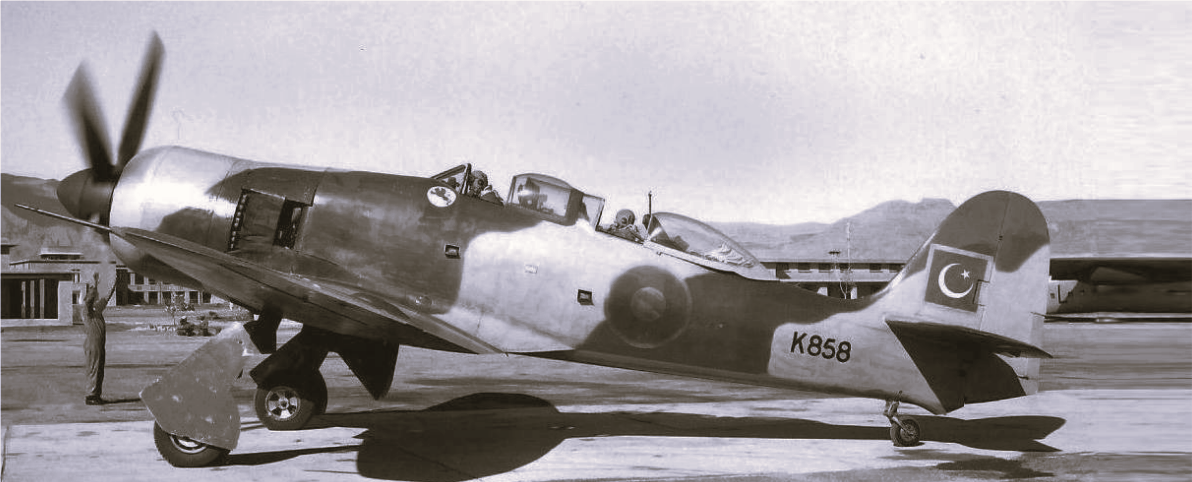
Hawker Sea Fury T.61 of No. 9 Squadron PAF "Griffins" taxies for take off for a photo session at Miranshah in December 1957.

In 1950, the Pakistan Air Force and the Tochi Scouts of Pakistan's paramilitary Frontier Corps carried counter-insurgency operations in the airfield. PAF No. 14 Fighter-bomber Squadron was stationed at the airfield, tasked to contain the insurgency in the tribal areas of North Waziristan. There was a weapons firing range for the PAF, located next to the airfield.

By 1958, Miranshah Airfield was used by Hawker Fury Fighter Aircraft, and was able to accommodate approximately 10,000 gallons of jet fuel. The airfield consisted of 8 hangars, two concrete/macadam runways, accommodations for 100 personnel, and received Category "A" maintenance by the PAF.

During the Cold War, there were three reported incidents of defecting aircraft landing at Miranshah. On 22 September, 1984, a defecting Antonov An-26 of 373rd Transport Aviation Regiment, Democratic Republic of Afghanistan Air Force (DRAAF) piloted by Col. Haji Fakir landed at Miranshah Airfield. On 28 June, 1985, two defecting Afghan Mil Mi-24 helicopters of 377th Independent Helicopter Regiment, DRAAF piloted by Mohammad Ishak and Mohammad Omar landed at Miranshah Airfield. The last incident, on 8 December, 1988, Captain Asadullah flying a Mikoyan-Gurevich MiG-21 of 322nd Fighter Aviation Regiment, DRAAF defected from Afghanistan to the airfield. On 30 March, 1987, a PAF General Dynamics F-16 Fighting Falcon shot down an intruding Afghan An-26 near Miranshah.

== Units ==
The following lists the squadrons based in Miranshah Airfield:

IAF

- No. 1 Squadron IAF (A Flt), 31 Aug 1937 – 21 Oct 1937, Westland Wapiti
- No. 1 Squadron IAF (A Flt), June 1938 – July 1938, Westland Wapiti
- No. 1 Squadron IAF (C Flt), 25 Sep 1938 – 18 Nov 1938, Westland Wapiti
- No. 1 Squadron IAF (A Flt), 31 Mar 1939 – 15 June 1939, Westland Wapiti
- No. 1 Squadron IAF (B Flt), 16 July 1940 – 25 Sep 1940, Hawker Hart
- No. 1 Squadron IAF, June 1941 – Aug 1941, Hawker Audax
- No. 2 Squadron IAF, 10 May 1941 – 27 Sep 1941, Westland Wapiti
- No. 2 Squadron IAF (A Flt), 27 Sep 1941 – 30 Nov 1941, Hawker Audax
- No. 3 Squadron IAF, 1 Dec 1941, Hawker Audax
- No. 1 Squadron IAF (A Flt), 30 Apr 1943 – 3 July 1943, Hurricane
- No. 1 Squadron IAF (B Flt), 3 July 1943 – 26 Aug 1943, Hurricane
- No. 1 Squadron IAF (A Flt), 26 Aug 1943 – 17 Nov 1943, Hurricane
- No. 1 Squadron IAF (B Flt), 17 Nov 1943 – 6 Dec 1943, Hurricane
- No. 2 Squadron IAF (A Flt), 6 Dec 1943 – 1 Mar 1944, Hurricane
- No. 2 Squadron IAF (B Flt), 1 Mar 1944 – 10 Apr 1944, Hurricane
- No. 3 Squadron IAF (B Flt), 10 Apr 1944 – 26 June 1944, Hurricane
- No. 6 Squadron IAF (B Flt), 26 June 1944 – 23 Sep 1944, Hurricane
- No. 6 Squadron IAF (A Flt), 23 Sep 1944 – 14 Dec 1944, Hurricane
- No. 1 Squadron IAF (A Flt), 3 May 1945 – 2 Aug 1945, Hurricane
- No. 1 Squadron IAF (B Flt), 2 Aug 1945 – 12 Oct 1945, Hurricane
- No. 6 Squadron IAF, 12 Oct 1945 – 28 Oct 1945, Hurricane
- No. 1 Squadron IAF (A Flt), 28 Oct 1945 – 11 Jan 1946, Hurricane
- No. 1 Squadron IAF (B Flt), 11 Jan 1946 – 31 Mar 1946, Supermarine Spitfire
- No. 2 Squadron IAF (A Flt), 31 Mar 1946 – 6 June 1946, Supermarine Spitfire
- No. 2 Squadron IAF (B Flt), 6 June 1946 – 27 June 1946, Supermarine Spitfire
- No. 9 Squadron IAF, 2 Sep 1946, Supermarine Spitfire
- No. 7 Squadron IAF, 27 June 1946 – 4 Mar 1947, Supermarine Spitfire

Royal Air Force

- No. 5 Squadron RAF detachments between 22 January 1925 and 15 December 1928, May 1930 to March 1931 and 15 October 1935 to 26 February 1941 with the Wapiti then Hart
- No. 11 Squadron RAF detachments between 22 January 1929 and 7 August 1939 with the Wapiti then Hart
- No. 20 Squadron RAF detachments between 5 January 1925 and 2 March 1942 with the Bristol F.2B Fighter, Wapiti, Audax and Lysander II
- No. 27 Squadron RAF detachments between 20 April 1923 and October 1940 with the DH.9A, Wapiti, Tiger Moth and Hart
- No. 28 Squadron RAF detachments between 15 December 1926 and 13 August 1930, 23 April 1937 and 31 January 1942 with the Bristol F.2B Fighter, Wapiti, Audax and Lysander II
- No. 39 Squadron RAF detachments between 22 January 1929 and 12 August 1939 with the DH.9A, Wapiti and Hart
- No. 60 Squadron RAF detachments between March 1923 and 3 March 1939 with the DH.9A and Wapiti
- No. 659 Squadron RAF detachment between 12 January 1946 and 1 January 1947 with the Auster V

== Present ==
In 2008, Miranshah Airfield and Dardoni Camp was marked abandoned on a topographic map of Landar prepared by the US National Geospatial-Intelligence Agency. Today, Miranshah Airfield is used for both, civil and military operations.
