= Gerald Gibbs (RAF officer) =

Royal Air Force air marshal (1896–1992)

Sir Gerald Gibbs
- Born: 3 September 1896; South Norwood, England
- Died: 13 October 1992 (aged 96); Harare, Zimbabwe
- Military career
- Allegiance: United Kingdom
- Branch: British Army (1914–18); Royal Air Force (1918–54)
- Service years: 1914–1954
- Rank: Air Marshal
- Unit: No. 17 Squadron RAF
- Commands: Indian Air Force (1951–54); RAF Kenya (1935–36); No. 47 Squadron (1934–35)
- Conflicts: First World War; Second World War
- Awards: Knight Commander of the Order of the British Empire; Companion of the Order of the Indian Empire; Military Cross & Two Bars; Mentioned in Despatches (2); Knight of the Legion of Honour (France); Croix de guerre (France)

Air Marshal Sir Gerald Ernest Gibbs, KBE, CIE, MC & Two Bars (3 September 1896 – 13 October 1992) was a senior commander in the Royal Air Force in the first half of the 20th century and the last RAF commander-in-chief of the Indian Air Force.

He was educated at Kingston Grammar School, Surrey. During the First World War he scored 10 victories (all in the S.E.5 biplane), becoming a double ace. He retired to Harare, Zimbabwe, in 1984.

Military offices
Preceded by Ronald Ivelaw-Chapman	Commander in Chief, Indian Air Force; 1951–1954	Succeeded by Subroto Mukerjee; As Chief of the Air Staff
