= Karun Krishna Majumdar =

Royal Indian Air Force officer

Wing Commander K K Majumdar DFC & bar
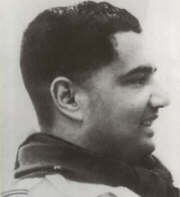
- Karun Krishna Majumdar
- Born: 6 September 1913; Kolkata, Bengal, British India
- Died: 17 February 1945 (aged 31); Lyallpur, Punjab, British India
- Military career
- Allegiance: India
- Service years: 1933 - 1945
- Rank: Wing commander
- Nickname: Jumbo
- Unit: No. 1 Squadron IAF
- Commands: No. 1 Squadron IAF
- Conflicts: World War II
- Awards: Bar to Distinguished Flying Cross; Distinguished Flying Cross

Wing Commander Karun Krishna 'Jumbo' Majumdar, DFC & bar (6 September 1913 – 17 February 1945) was an officer in the Indian Air Force. He was the first Indian to reach the rank of wing commander.

== Early life ==
Majumdar was born in Kolkata in a Brahmin family on 6 September 1913. His maternal grandfather was Womesh Chunder Bonnerjee, the first president of the Indian National Congress.

Because he was over six feet tall and well-built, he acquired the nickname 'Jumbo' (probably derived from Majumdar). He attended St. Paul's School, Darjeeling. In 1932, Majumdar travelled to England and enrolled in Royal Air Force College Cranwell. This was the third batch of Indian pilots at Cranwell and he was one of three Indian pilots in the batch, which included Air Commodore Narendra. In 1934, he returned to India as a trained pilot.

He and his elder brother, Jai Krishna Majumdar, had taken entrance exams together, with Jai opting for Sandhurst, while Karun opted for Cranwell. His brother was commissioned into the 16th Light Cavalry in 1933 and was a pilot as well. He would later be killed in a training flight crash in October 1942. His cousins Jayanto Nath Chaudhuri and Hem Chaudhuri also joined the Indian Armed Forces; the former joined the Indian Army and rose to become the 6th Chief of the Army Staff, while the latter followed Majumdar into the Air Force.

== Career ==
Majumdar joined No. 1 Squadron of the Indian Air Force in the 1930s as a flying officer. Majumdar first flew Westland Wapiti and then Hawker Hart. Soon he was promoted to flight commander of the 'C' Flight of No. 1 Squadron. In June 1941, Majumdar was promoted to squadron leader and took charge of No. 1 Squadron in Miramshah. In August 1941, No. 1 Squadron was upgraded with Westland Lysanders and training commenced in Drigh Road.

=== World War II ===
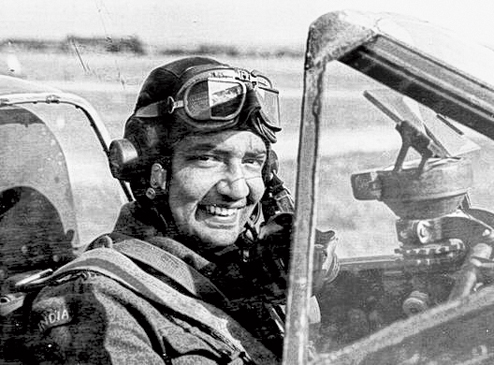
Karun Krishna Majumdar before flying

In 1942, the Imperial Japanese forces occupied Burma. No. 1 Squadron of the Royal Indian Air Force was posted to Burma, and Majumdar reached Taungoo with his squadron on 31 January 1942. On the very next day, the Imperial Japanese Army Air Force based in Mae Hong Son in Thailand bombed Taungoo, inflicting considerable damage. However, No. 1 Squadron, which had taken the precaution of dispersing and hiding their Lysanders, was unharmed.

Majumdar immediately planned retaliatory action, even though the Westland Lysander was an army co-operation aircraft not meant to serve either as a fighter or as a bomber. Slinging two 250-pound bombs on the stub wings of a Lysander, he set off solo on 2 February 1942 towards the Japanese airbase at Mae Hong Son. The New Zealanders of No. 67 Squadron of Royal Air Force send two Buffalo aircraft as escort. Majumdar took considerable risk in flying low and dropping bombs accurately on target, destroying the enemy hangar, aircraft and airfield. On the next day, Majumdar led the entire squadron in a bombing mission and destroyed the aircraft, wireless installations and the buildings. Until they were withdrawn from Burma in March–April 1942, No. 1 Squadron played a stellar role supporting the army, for which they were commended by General Archibald Wavell. On one occasion Majumdar was forced down in the Shan jungles due to engine failure and managed to return to Lashio after a harrowing journey through dense forests. Majumdar was awarded the Distinguished Flying Cross, gazetted in the London Gazette of 10 November 1942.

After returning from Burma, Majumdar spent the next two years in staff and flying assignments. He was promoted to wing commander, the first Indian to reach this rank.

In 1943, Majumdar volunteered for a role in the European theatre. He arrived in England in March 1944. In order to serve in an operational squadron, he voluntarily relinquished his acting rank of wing commander and reverted to squadron leader. After converting to North American Mustang aircraft at 41 OTU (Operational Training Unit), Majumdar joined No. 268 Squadron RAF, a photo-reconnaissance squadron, at RAF Gatwick in early June 1944. 268 squadron was then commanded by Squadron Leader Albert S. Mann, DFC, an old acquaintance of Majumdar from Burma.

In his first operational flight on 10 June 1944, he made a reconnaissance of the Seine River and carried out ground-strafing of enemy targets. His operational tour ended on 20 September. During this period of 100 days, Majumdar flew 65 sorties in Mustangs and Hawker Typhoons - he preferred the former to the latter, writing in his diary that "She is no lady like the Mustang, but is pretty hot stuff." He successfully completed two low-level photo-reconnaissance missions, one of the bridges over the Seine ("I went through an absolute hail of flak to get photographs of the rail bridge on the Seine at Rouen", he wrote), and another of the Falaise Gap in Normandy. His Falaise photographs were later used by Field Marshal Bernard Montgomery in the Battle of the Falaise Pocket. On one occasion he got shot up and force-landed in enemy territory, but was luckily rescued. The Bar to his DFC was gazetted on 23 January 1945, the citation specifically mentioning the Seine missions. Thus he became the most highly decorated Indian pilot of World War II.

Because of his superb piloting skills and indomitable spirit, Life magazine featured him in its issue of 15 May 1944 among twelve of the world's most outstanding airmen. His portrait was painted by the artist William Dring, Royal Academy.

== Death ==
On the afternoon of 17 February 1945, Majumdar took part in a flying display at Walton, near Lahore in a Hawker Hurricane. The aircraft he chose had a history of snags and malfunctions, and he was warned by Flying Officer Harjinder Singh. During a dive in the aerobatic routine, the aircraft developed a problem and crashed headlong into the ground. Majumdar died instantly. He was 31.

The following epitaph appears on the marble headstone of his grave at Lahore:

"Go, passers-by / And do if you can as he did / A Man's part / In defence of liberty."

== See also ==
- Indra Lal Roy
- Subroto Mukerjee

Military offices
Preceded by Subroto Mukerjee	Commanding officer No. 1 Squadron IAF; 1941–1942	Succeeded by Subroto Mukerjee
