= Mehar Singh (commodore) =

Indian fighter pilot (1915–1952)

Air Commodore Mehar Singh MVC, DSO
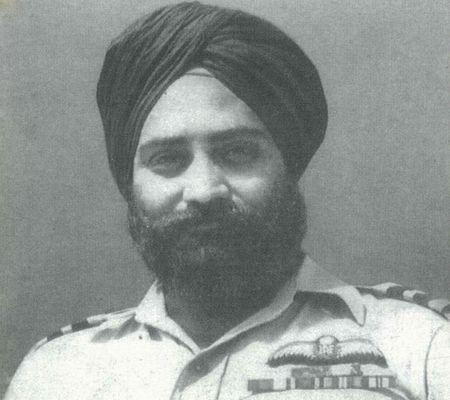
- Born: 20 March 1915; Lyallpur, Punjab, British India
- Died: 11 March 1952 (aged 36); Delhi, India
- Military career
- Allegiance: British India (1936-1947); India (from 1947)
- Branch: Royal Indian Air Force (1936-1947); Indian Air Force (1947-1952)
- Service years: 1936 – 1948
- Rank: Air Commodore
- Nickname: Mehar Baba
- Unit: No. 1 Squadron IAF
- Commands: No 1 Operational Group; No. 6 Squadron RIAF; No. 3 Squadron IAF
- Conflicts: World War II; Indo-Pakistani War of 1947–1948
- Awards: Maha Vir Chakra; Distinguished Service Order

Air Commodore Mehar Singh, MVC, DSO (20 March 1915 – 11 March 1952) was a fighter pilot in the Indian Air Force. He was affectionately known as 'Mehar Baba', a sobriquet coined by Aspy Engineer. Considered a Legend of the IAF, he last served as the Air Officer Commanding No. 1 Operational Group.

In the 1940s, Flt. Lt. Asghar Khan stated, “with the solitary exception of Squadron Leader Mehar Singh, a pilot of exceptional ability, no one was able to inspire confidence among us.”

== Early life and education ==
Mehar Singh was born on 20 March 1915 at Lyallpur (now Faisalabad in Pakistan). He was selected for the Royal Air Force College Cranwell (RAFC), England in 1933 while he was in the final year of Bachelor of Science and joined in 1934. He performed exceedingly well at Cranwell, which impressed college authorities.

Air Vice Marshall H. M. Grave, commandant, RAFC wrote of Singh:

Keen, cheerful, hardworking and popular. His work compares favourably with that of English cadets. A creditable effort! An exceptionally good pilot, keen on games and has represented the college at hockey of which he is an excellent player.

== Military career ==
=== Early career ===
Singh was commissioned as a pilot officer in August 1936 and posted to No. 1 Squadron, then the only squadron in RAF India. It was raised on 1 April 1933 at Karachi with four Westland Wapiti aircraft. The Indian element consisted of six officers and nine technicians then known as Hawai Sepoys. Singh was amongst the first six pioneering officers who joined the squadron. Flight Lieutenant C. A. Bouchier, DFC, an officer of the Royal Air Force (RAF) was the first commanding officer of the squadron.

General William Slim about Mehar Singh and his squadron

"I was particularly impressed with the conduct of the Squadron led by a young Sikh Squadron Leader (Mehar Singh). They were a happy and efficient unit."

—

Under the leadership of Singh, No. 6 Squadron RIAF with its Hawker Hurricane aircraft, came to be known as 'The Eyes of the 14th Army', which was commanded by General William Slim.

On 14 May 1947, he was promoted to the acting rank of Group Captain and was appointed Group Captain in charge of Flying Training at Air headquarters. He was promoted to the rank along with Wing Commander Narendra. On 15 August 1947, he was appointed the head of the operations directorate at Air headquarters and designated Group Captain (Operations).

=== Indo-Pakistani War of 1947–1948 ===
After the accession of Jammu and Kashmir on 26 October 1947, the first Indian Army units were airlifted to Srinagar, starting with the 1st battalion Sikh Regiment (1 Sikh) led by Lieutenant Colonel Dewan Ranjit Rai. An entire infantry brigade was to be airlifted. Mehar Singh was the first pilot to land at Srinagar and as the AOC No. 1 Operational Group, he inducted the troops in just five days. Lord Mountbatten lauded this feat, saying that he didn't know of an instance of an airlift being effected in such a short time.

Singh then established an air bridge to Poonch. He personally piloted the first aircraft and landed at Poonch Airport. The airstrip was surrounded by streams on three sides and has a steep approach. Against heavy odds, he landed a Douglas with three tons of load against normal rated load of one ton. Moreover, he did so without any landing aids, the airstrip being lit with the help of oil lamps.

Singh was also the first pilot to land in Leh in Ladakh. Along with Major General K S Thimayya as passenger, led a flight of Six Dakotas of No. 12 Squadron IAF across the Himalayas, towering up to 24,000 feet negotiating the Zoji La and Fotu La passes and landed at an improvised sandy airstrip next to the Indus River at a height of 11,540 feet. Singh did this without de-icing equipment, cabin pressurisation or route maps.

== Awards and decorations ==
=== Distinguished Service Order ===
In March 1944, then Acting Squadron Leader Mehar Singh was awarded the Distinguished Service Order (DSO), the only officer of the Indian Air Force to have won this award.

The citation of the DSO reads as follows:

CITATION

ACTING SQUADRON LEADER MEHAR SINGH

(Ind. 1559), Indian Air Force, No. 6 (I.A.F.) Squadron

This officer has completed a very large number of operations, and has displayed great skill, courage and determination. He is a most inspiring leader, whose example has been reflected in the fine fighting spirit of the squadron. This officer has rendered most valuable service.

=== Maha Vir Chakra ===
On 26 January 1950, when the Awards and decorations of the Indian Armed Forces were established, Air Commodore Mehar Singh was awarded the second-highest war-time military decoration, the Maha Vir Chakra (MVC).

The citation of the MVC reads as follows:

CITATION

AIR COMMODORE MEHAR SINGH, DSO

(1559), GD(P)

Throughout his tenure as AOC No. 1 Group controlling operations in Jammu & Kashmir, Air Commodore Mehar Singh displayed great devotion to duty at personal risks and set an example to those serving under him. He was the first pilot to land an aircraft at the emergency landing ground at Poonch and at Leh. These tasks were not part of his duty but since these were hazardous tasks he was first to carry them out to give confidence to his junior pilots.

== Resignation ==
Singh resigned from the IAF on 27 September 1948, over differences with some senior officers on service matters, instead of getting involved in controversy.

== Death ==
Singh died in an aviation accident on 11 March 1952.

== Legacy ==
Singh was considered to be a legendary pilot and a flying prodigy. He was the first pilot to land in Srinagar, Poonch, Leh and Daulat Beg Oldi. In a relatively short career of 12 years, he rose to the rank of air commodore and was decorated with two war-time gallantry awards.

In 2018, the Indian Air Force constituted the Meher Baba Prize in the honour of Air Commodore Mehar Singh for drones development.

Military offices
| Preceded by Aspy Engineer | Commanding Officer, RAF Station Kohat; 1946–1947 | Succeeded by Arjan Singh |
| New title First Holder | Group Captain (Operations); 1947–1947 | Succeeded by Surendra Nath Goyal |
| New title First Holder | Air Officer Commanding No. 1 Operational Group; 1947–1948 | Succeeded by Aspy Engineer |
