= Subroto Mukerjee =

First Chief of the Air Staff of India

Air Marshal Subroto Mukerjee OBE
- সুব্রত মুখোপাধ্যায়
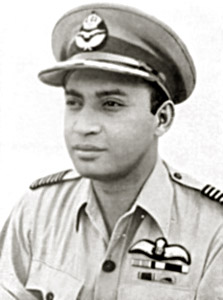
- Air Marshal Subroto Mukerjee (pictured wearing Group Captain's insignia, c. 1947)

4th Chief of the Air Staff and Commander-in-Chief, Indian Air Force
- In office 1 April 1954 – 8 November 1960 (redesignated as Chief of the Air Staff from 1 April 1955)
- Preceded by: Gerald Ernest Gibbs
- Succeeded by: Aspy Merwan Engineer

Personal details
- Born: 5 March 1911 Calcutta, Bengal Presidency, British India
- Died: 8 November 1960 (aged 49) Tokyo, Japan
- Relations: See Nibaran Chandra Mukherjee family and Das Family
- Awards: Order of the British Empire

Military service
- Allegiance: British India (1932–1947); India (1947–1960)
- Branch/service: Royal Indian Air Force (1932–1947); Indian Air Force (1947–1960)
- Years of service: 1932–1960
- Rank: Air Marshal
- Unit: No. 1 Squadron IAF
- Commands: Air Force Station Kohat; No. 1 Squadron IAF
- Battles/wars: Annexation of Hyderabad; Indo-Pakistani War of 1947–1948; World War II; Waziristan campaign (1936–1939)

Subroto Mukerjee (Bengali: সুব্রত মুখোপাধ্যায়) (5 March 1911 – 8 November 1960) was an Indian military officer who was the first Indian Commander-in-Chief (C-in-C) of the Indian Air Force. He was awarded several honours during the course of a three-decade-long career, ended by his untimely demise in 1960. Mukerjee has been called the "Father of the Indian Air Force."

Born in a Bengali family of repute, he was educated both in India and in the United Kingdom. He joined the Royal Air Force and later was one of the first recruits of the Indian Air Force (IAF) in 1933. He flew with the No. 1 Squadron IAF from 1933 to 1941. He saw extensive action in the North-West Frontier Province during this stint and was mentioned in dispatches. He attended the Staff College, Quetta in 1941 before returning to command No. 1 Squadron in 1942. He commanded the RAF Station Kohat from 1943 to 1944 before moving to Air HQ as director of flying training. He was awarded the OBE in 1945.

Following the Partition of India, he was appointed Deputy Air Commander, Royal Indian Air Force. After completing the higher command course at the Imperial Defence College, he was appointed Commander-in-Chief of the IAF in 1954. He oversaw the transformation of IAF into an all-jet force. From 1955, he also served as the Chairman of the Chiefs of Staff Committee. He died while on a visit to Tokyo in 1960. His accidental death came as a shock to the Air Force and the nation and he was cremated with full military honours in New Delhi.

He had many firsts to his credit: the first Indian to command a flight, in 1938, the first Indian to command a squadron, in 1939, the first to command a station, in 1943, and finally, the first Indian to command the Service itself, in 1954.

== Early life and education ==
Mukerjee was born in Calcutta on 5 March 1911 in a well-known Bengali Brahmo family. His father was Satish Chandra Mukherjee of the Indian Civil Service, and his mother, Charulata Mukherjee, was a social worker. His paternal grandfather, Nibaran Chandra Mukherjee, pioneered several social and educational reforms in India and was a member of the Brahmo Samaj. His maternal grandfather Prasanna Kumar Roy of the Indian Education Service, was the first Indian Principal of Presidency College, Kolkata. His maternal grandmother, Sarala Roy, was an educationist and social worker who founded the Gokhale Memorial Girls' School.

The youngest of four children, Mukherjee was taken to England when he was three months old. However, he spent his childhood in Krishnanagar and Chinsura in Bengal. As a boy, he displayed an aptitude for a military career, probably inherited from his uncle, Flight Lieutenant Indra Lal Roy, who had joined the Royal Flying Corps during the First World War. Roy was the first Indian to be awarded the Distinguished Flying Cross and the only Indian flying ace.

Mukerjee's elder sister Renuka Ray was a prominent freedom fighter, who became a member of the Indian parliament, cabinet minister and ambassador. She attended the University of Cambridge and the London School of Economics.

Mukerjee was educated at Nainital Diocesan Boys' High School later known as Sherwood College, Nainital, at Loreto Convent in Calcutta, at Howrah Zilla School, and also at a school in Hampstead in England. He completed his secondary education at Birbhum Zilla School in 1927. He then attended Presidency College, Calcutta for year, before studying at the University of Cambridge.

== Military career ==
=== Early career ===
The first batch of Indian pilots at RAF Cranwell in 1931. From left to right: Bhupendra Singh, Amarjeet Singh and Subroto Mukerjee.

In 1928, the British Government agreed to permit Indians to enter the Royal Air Force College Cranwell. While initially only two vacancies were recommended, the number was later increased to six. This was done so that a flight of a squadron could be completely Indian. Mukerjee sat for the Cranwell entrance examination, becoming one of the first six Indians selected to undergo two years of flying training at the college.

With the Indian Air Force Act being passed by the Central Legislative Assembly, the IAF was established on 8 October 1932 as an auxiliary force of the Royal Air Force. Mukerjee was commissioned as a pilot officer. After completing their training at Cranwell, the Indian pilots received further training at the Army Cooperation School at Old Sarum Airfield in Wiltshire. Mukerjee served with the No. 16 Squadron RAF for about a year before returning to India.

On 1 April 1933, "A" Flight of the No. 1 Squadron IAF was formed at Drigh Road in Karachi, with Flight Lieutenant Cecil Bouchier in command. Mukerjee was one of the five Indian pilots who made up the flight. The flight was equipped with four Westland Wapitis. On 15 February 1934, Mukerjee was promoted to the rank of flying officer.

Though widely regarded as the first Indian officer in the Indian Air Force, Subroto Mukerjee was in fact the second Indian to be commissioned. The first was Harish Chander Sircar, who was dismissed from service in 1935.

In 1936, a rebellion erupted in North-West Frontier Province (NWFP), led by the Pukhtoon tribes. The Indian Air Force were forced to play a major role in containing the rebellion due to the harsh terrain of the region. Mukerjee was awarded the India General Service Medal with the clasps 'North West Frontier 1936–37', and 'North West Frontier 1937–39'.

In July 1938, 'B' flight of the No. 1 Squadron IAF was formed. Mukerjee took command of the flight. He was one of the three flying officers of the three flights of No. 1 Squadron. On 15 February 1939, he was promoted to the rank of flight lieutenant. He took command of the No. 1 Squadron on 16 March 1939, the first Indian officer to command a squadron. In June 1939, under Mukerjee, the squadron converted to Hawker Hart aircraft with a few Hawker Audax aircraft in its inventory. He led the squadron into action at Miramshah in NWFP.

=== World War II ===
At the outbreak of World War II, Coastal Defence Flights (CDFs) of the Indian Air Force Volunteer Reserve (IAFVR) were formed. Mukerjee was the senior Indian commissioned officer in the IAF. He was promoted to the acting rank of squadron leader on 25 August 1939. On 7 August 1940, he observed a beleaguered army picket, with the troops indicating that they were running out of ammunition. Mukerjee and his gunner removed ammunition from the rear cockpit-mounted Lewis machine gun and stuffed it into pairs of socks. The ammunition was dropped to the troops in a low pass under concentrated fire. The picket held out until another aircraft air-dropped a large cache of ammunition.

In June 1941, Mukerjee handed over command of No. 1 Squadron to Squadron Leader Karun Krishna Majumdar. He was selected to attend the Staff College, Quetta. Due to the war, the staff course was reduced to a duration of six months. By this time, No. 1 Squadron had moved to Secunderabad and was re-equipped with the Westland Lysander. In March 1942, Mukerjee took command of the squadron for the second time.

In December 1942, Mukerjee was mentioned in dispatches for his distinguished service during the operations in the NWFP. He commanded RAF Station Kohat from 28 August 1943 to December 1944, becoming the first Indian officer to command an airbase. During this time, the British Indian Army officer and author Major Francis Yeats-Brown praised the professionalism and the efficiency of the IAF, based on his experience at the Kohat airbase.

After handing over command to Aspy Engineer, Mukerjee subsequently moved to Air Headquarters, having been appointed director of flying training. In June 1945, he was appointed an officer of the Order of the British Empire (OBE). As the most senior Indian officer in the Royal Indian Air Force (RIAF), on 15 May 1947, Mukerjee was promoted to the acting rank of air commodore and became the first Indian air officer. He was appointed the Deputy Assistant to the Air Officer-in-charge Administration at Air headquarters.

=== Post-independence ===
On 15 August 1947, with the Partition of India, a new Air Headquarters of the Dominion of India was formed. Mukerjee was appointed the Senior Air Staff Officer (SASO), in addition to being appointed Deputy Air Commander, RIAF. The assets of the Indian Air Force (like other branches of the military) had to be divided between the dominions of India and Pakistan. Mukerjee led the air force part of this committee.

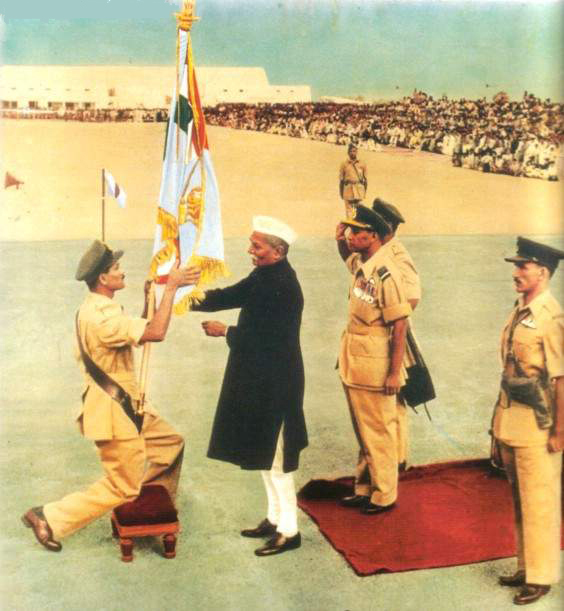
Air Marshal Mukerjee saluting as the President of India, Rajendra Prasad, presents the colours to the Indian Air Force in 1954

After the outbreak of the Indo-Pakistani War of 1947, Mukerjee was promoted to the acting rank of air vice marshal on 15 November 1947. In the Poonch sector, the road link was under threat of being cut off. An air bridge had to be established to provide supplies to the besieged troops. The first aircraft to land at Poonch Airport was piloted by Air Commodore Mehar Singh, air officer commanding No. 1 Operational Group, with Mukerjee as a passenger. The airstrip was surrounded by streams on three sides and had a steep approach. Against heavy odds, he landed a Douglas with a load of three tons, against a normal rated load of one ton. The landing was done without any landing aids, the airstrip being lit with the help of oil lamps. On 15 March 1948, Mukerjee took over as the officiating chief of the air staff and air marshal commanding RIAF when Air Marshal Sir Thomas Elmhirst left to the United Kingdom on deputation. He remained in command of the RIAF for about a year.

In September 1948, India initiated a police action against Hyderabad State. Mukerjee controlled and aided air operations in aid of the troops during the annexation of Hyderabad. In September 1952, he was selected to attend the Imperial Defence College. He attended the course during 1953, along with Captain Ram Dass Katari, the senior Indian naval officer at that time. After completing the year-long course, he returned to India in early 1954. His military service at the Air Headquarters from 1944, and having served as the SASO and deputy commander-in-chief under the first three chiefs of Independent India, fully qualified him for the top post.

=== Commander-in-Chief ===
On 1 April 1954, Mukerjee took over as the commander-in-chief of the Indian Air Force, with the rank of air marshal. When the Change in Designation Act, 1955, was passed, the title of "Commander-in-Chief" was replaced by Chief of the Air Staff (CAS). Thus Mukerjee became the first Indian commander-in-chief as well as chief of air staff of the Indian Air Force.

On 22 July 1955, with the retirement of the Chief of the Naval Staff Admiral Sir Charles Pizey, Mukerjee took over as the chairman of the Chiefs of Staff Committee. He is the longest-serving such chairman in history, having served for more than five years, until his untimely death in 1960.

During his tenure, the aircraft of the IAF were replaced with transonic jet fighters and bombers. It witnessed all-round expansion and modernisation. In August 1958, Mukerjee was given a second tenure for a period of four years, starting 1 October 1958.

== Awards and decorations ==

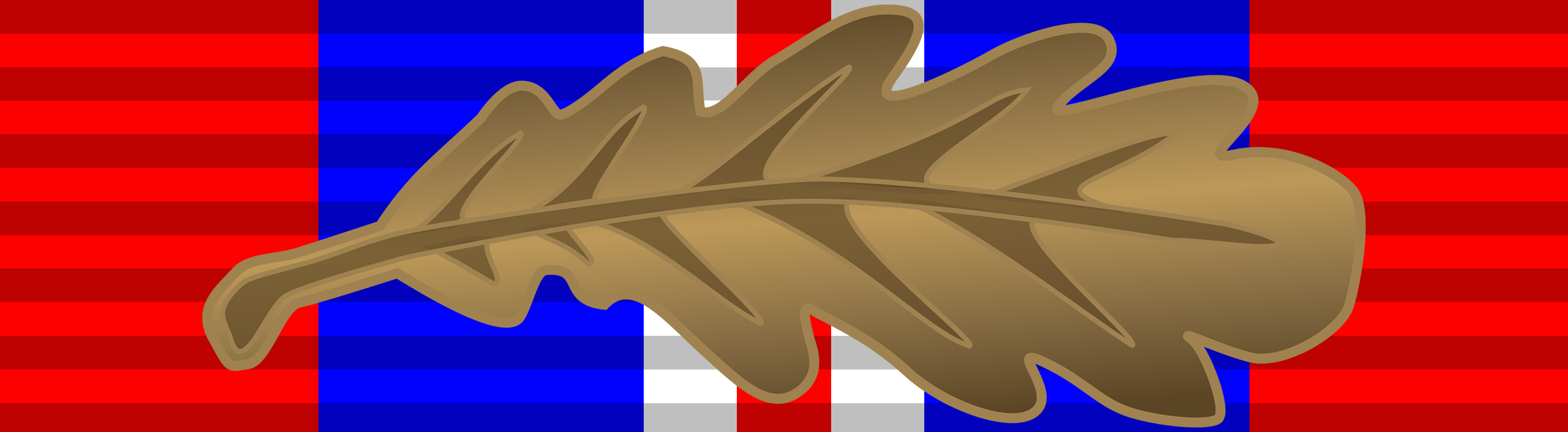

Indian Independence Medal (1948)	Order of the British Empire (1945)		India General Service Medal (1939)
1939-1945 Star (1945)	War Medal 1939-1945 (1945; with MID oak leaf)	India Service Medal (1945)	King George VI Coronation Medal (1937)

== Dates of rank ==
Insignia	Rank	Component	Date of rank
	Pilot Officer	Royal Indian Air Force	1 September 1932
	Flying Officer	Royal Indian Air Force	15 February 1934
	Flight Lieutenant	Royal Indian Air Force	15 February 1939
	Squadron Leader	Royal Indian Air Force	25 August 1939 (acting); 15 February 1942 (substantive)
	Wing Commander	Royal Indian Air Force	1 October 1943 (acting); 15 August 1948 (substantive)
	Group Captain	Royal Indian Air Force	6 March 1946 (acting); 15 November 1947 (substantive)
	Air Commodore	Royal Indian Air Force	15 May 1947 (acting); 15 August 1948 (substantive)
	Air Vice Marshal	Royal Indian Air Force	15 November 1947 (acting)
	Air Vice Marshal	Indian Air Force	26 January 1950 (recommissioning and change in insignia); 1 October 1951 (substantive)
	Air Marshal (CAS)	Indian Air Force	1 April 1954 (acting); 1 October 1954 (substantive)

== Personal life ==
In 1939, Mukerjee married Sharda Mukherjee (née Pandit), who was from a prominent Maharashtrian family. They had one son. Sharda was active in social work, and after her husband's death, she became active in public affairs. She was elected to Lok Sabha twice. In 1977, she was appointed as the Governor of Andhra Pradesh. She was subsequently appointed the Governor of Gujarat. She was the first woman governor of both states.

== Death ==
In November 1960, Air India inaugurated its service to Tokyo, Japan. Mukerjee and Air Commodore (later ACM) Pratap Chandra Lal, then General Manager of the Indian Airlines Corporation were passengers on this flight. After landing in Tokyo, on 8 November 1960, Mukerjee was having a meal in a restaurant with a friend, an Indian Navy officer. A piece of food became lodged in his windpipe, causing him to choke. Mukerjee died before a doctor could be called for. The next day, his body was flown to Palam Airport, New Delhi.

Mukerjee was cremated with full military honours. From Palam Airport, a hearse carried him to Air House. On 11 November, numerous visitors offered their respects. As his body was leaving Air House, a 15-gun salute, at one minute interval, was fired. His body was carried on a gun carriage to the Nigambodh Ghat, with servicemen lining the whole route. He was paid a final tribute with a flypast of forty-nine aircraft, one for each of his forty-nine years. The death came as a shock to the nation and to the Indian Air Force. A black-bordered extraordinary edition of The Gazette of India was issued on 9 November. The Indian Government received tributes from around the world, conveyed by the ambassadors and military attachés in New Delhi.

== Legacy ==
ACM Pratap Chandra Lal considered Mukerjee the foremost pioneer of military aviation in India. He was a much-loved figure in the Air Force. Aspy Engineer, a close associate of Mukerjee, assumed the role of CAS from 1 December 1960. He issued a Special Order of the Day paying tribute to Mukerjee and called him the "Father of the Indian Air Force".

Mukerjee, an eminent football lover and a regular member of Mohun Bagan, had conceived the idea of an inter-school all-India football tournament. This was implemented after his death. The Subroto Cup Football Tournament still helps find talented players from Indian schools. In July 1949, the RIAF introduced the Mukerjee Trophy for the 'Airmen's Mess and Dining Competition', in order for units to further improve messing conditions and amenities of airmen.

Subroto Park in the Delhi Cantonment is named after Mukerjee. The Air Force School, the headquarters of the Western Air Command, and the Army Hospital (Research & Referral) are all located here. The Centre for Air Power Studies organises the Subroto Mukerjee International Seminar annually.

== See also ==
- Field Marshal K. M. Cariappa
- Admiral Ram Dass Katari

== Citations ==
Military offices
Preceded by Admiral Mark Pizey	Chairman of the Chiefs of Staff Committee; 1955–1960	Succeeded by General K S Thimayya
Preceded by Sir Gerald Gibbs; As Commander-in-Chief	Chief of the Air Staff; 1954–1960	Succeeded by Aspy Engineer
New title Appointment created	Deputy Chief of the Air Staff (Deputy Air Commander, RIAF till Jan 1949); 1947–1952	Succeeded by Aspy Engineer
Preceded by Francis Parmer Smythies	Commanding Officer, RAF Station Kohat; 1946–1947	Succeeded by Aspy Engineer
Preceded by Karun Krishna Majumdar	Commanding officer No. 1 Squadron IAF; 1942–1942	Succeeded by Henry Runganathan
Preceded by C H Smith	Commanding officer No. 1 Squadron IAF; 1939–1941	Succeeded by Karun Krishna Majumdar
