= Chief of the Air Staff (India) =

Professional head of the Indian Air Force

- Flag of the Chief of the Air Staff

- Incumbent; Air Chief Marshal Ashutosh Dixit; PVSM AVSM VM VSM since 31 October 2026
- Indian Air Force
- Status: Professional head of aerial branch of the Indian Armed Forces.
- Abbreviation: CAS
- Member of: Defence Acquisition Council; Defence Planning Committee; National Security Council
- Reports to: President of India; Prime Minister of India; Minister of Defence; Chief of Defence Staff
- Residence: Air House 23, Akbar Road, New Delhi
- Seat: Air HQ, Vayu Bhawan, New Delhi
- Appointer: Appointments Committee of the Cabinet (ACC) President of India
- Term length: 3 years or at the age of 62, whichever is earlier.
- Constituting instrument: Air Force Act, 1950 (Act No. 45 of 1950)
- Precursor: Chief of the Air Staff and Commander-in-Chief, Indian Air Force
- Formation: 26 January 1950; 76 years ago
- First holder: Air Marshal Sir Thomas Elmhirst
- Deputy: Vice Chief of the Air Staff (VCAS)
- Salary: ₹250,000 (US$2,600) monthly
- Website: Official website

The Chief of the Air Staff (CAS) has been the title of the professional head of the Indian Air Force since 1955. The CAS is a permanent member of the Chiefs of Staff Committee, National Security Council and Defence Planning Committee and serves as a senior advisor to the Minister of Defence, Prime Minister and the President, who is the supreme commander of the Defence Forces. The position is customarily held by a four-star air chief marshal and is usually the highest ranking air force officer on active duty unless the Chief of Defence Staff is an air force officer. Prior to 1955, the position was known as the Commander in Chief, Indian Air Force.

Being a permanent member of the Chiefs of Staff Committee (COSC) and the National Security Council (NSC), the CAS also bears the responsibility of advising the nation's civilian leadership i.e., the Government of India on all matters privy to the IAF.

Statutorily, the CAS ranks 12th-overall in the Indian order of precedence, and is the IAF's status-equivalent of the Chief of Defence Staff, the Chief of the Army Staff and the Chief of the Naval Staff - all three positions of which are also occupied by four-star officers from the armed forces.

== Description ==
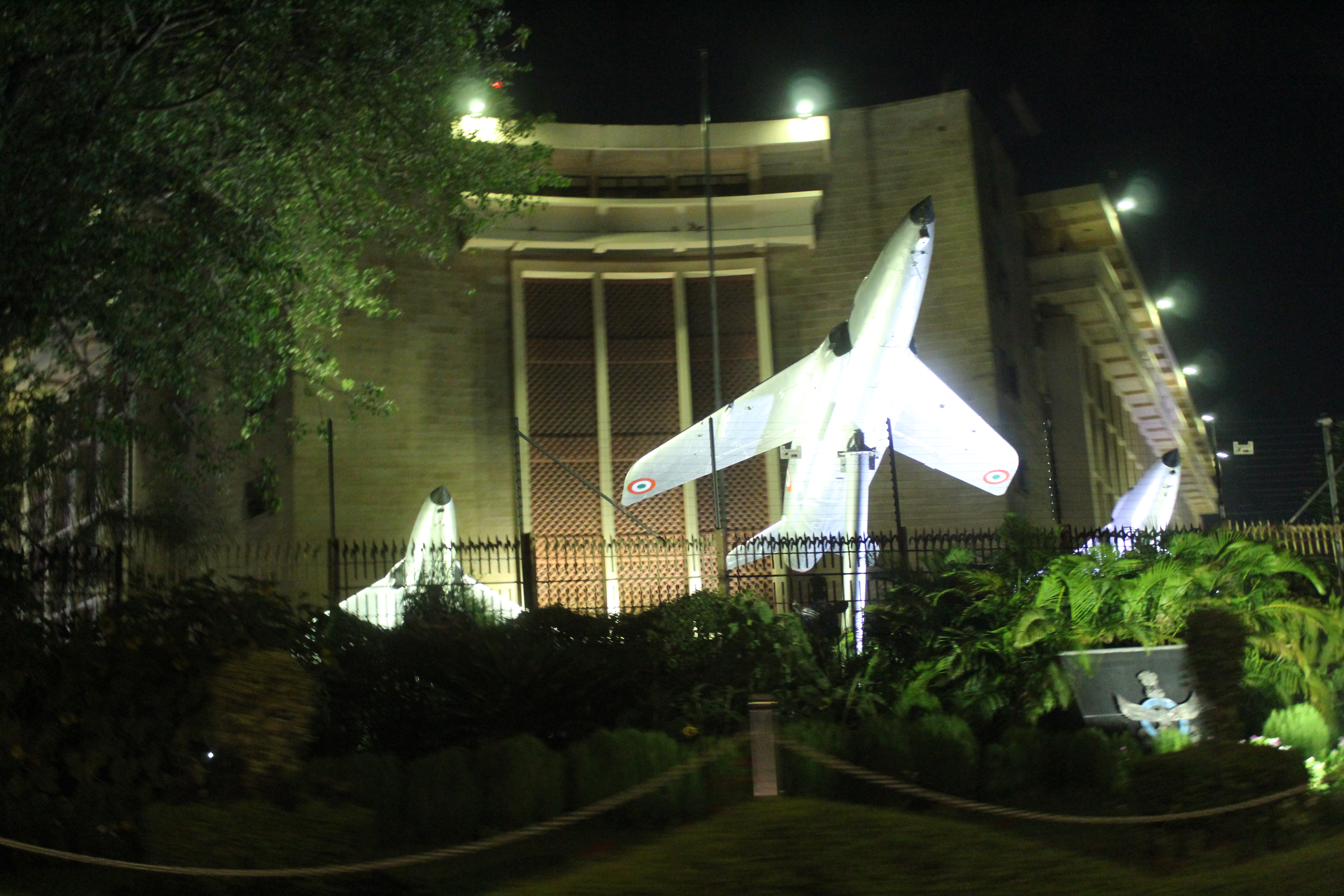
The Vayu Bhawan, New Delhi - the station of Air HQ, where the CAS is seated.

=== Roles and responsibilities ===
Seated at Air Headquarters (Air HQ), stationed in New Delhi, the CAS is the senior-most operational officer of the IAF, and is tasked with the following:

- Advising the Central Government on all matters privy to the IAF.
- Coordinating various components of the IAF towards the protection-cum-realization of the nation's air sovereignty during states of armed conflict or war.
- Providing direction towards the overall functioning of the organization's facets, such as command, control, administration and strategy.
- Convening courts-martial at the behest of the Central Government to review cases of misconduct during peace and wartime.
- Reviewing the judicial sentencing and pleas of officers convicted of professional misconduct whilst in service.

In addition to these responsibilities, the CAS is also a permanent member of:

- Chiefs of Staff Committee (COSC)
- National Security Council (NSC)
- Defence Planning Committee (DPC)
- Defence Acquisition Council (DAC)

The office's eminence in the aforementioned groups thus grants the appointee with the role to advise the Minister of Defence (Raksha Mantri or RM) on the affairs related to the IAF's functioning and the promotion of an comprehensive integrated planning policy with respect to the affairs of tri-service integration, doctrinal strategy, capability development, defence acquisition and infrastructure.

=== Structure ===
As the professional head of the force, the CAS is assisted by one subordinate officer and one principal staff officer, namely:

- Subordinate
  - Vice Chief of the Air Staff (VCAS)
- Principal Staff Officer
  - Deputy Chief of the Air Staff (DCAS)
  - Air Officer in Charge of Administration (AOA)
  - Air Officer in Charge of Personnel (AOP)
  - Air Officer in Charge of Maintenance (AOM)
- Director-Generals
  - Director General (Inspection and Safety) - DG (I&S)
  - Director General Air Operations - DG (Ops)
  - Director General of Works and Ceremonial - DG (W&C)
  - Director General (Aircraft) - DG (Ac)
  - Director General (Systems) - DG (Sys)
  - Director General of Medical Services (Air) - DGMS (Air)
  - Director General (Administration) - DG (Admin)

=== Promotion ===
Initially, beginning in the pre-independence era, until 1966, the office of CAS was held by a three-star air marshal; the first six chiefs in the post-independence IAF were three-star air marshals. However, the office’s rank-specifications was raised to the four-star rank of air chief marshal in January 1966, initially as a recognitive measure to Air Marshal Arjan Singh, the IAF's third and then-incumbent CAS, for his leadership of the IAF during the Indo-Pakistani War of 1965; every CAS-appointee since then has been an air chief marshal.

The move to appoint a new designate to the position usually begins three months before the change-of-command, wherein the Ministry of Defence (MoD) reviews the résumés of the IAF's senior-most air marshals, which regularly includes the Vice Chief of the Air Staff and at-most three of the Air Officer Commanding-in-Chiefs (AOC-in-C) of the force’s combatant commands. Appointments to the position are made by the Appointments Committee of the Cabinet (ACC) - comprising the Prime Minister and the Minister of Defence, upon recommendation from Air HQ; appointees to the office are subsequently promoted to the rank of air chief marshal.

Since 1950, the senior-most air marshals in the IAF's command cadre have customarily been appointed as CAS; this tradition was broken in 1973, when Air Marshal Om Prakash Mehra was promoted over two senior officers, and in 1988, when Air Marshal S. K. Mehra was promoted over one senior officer to become CAS.

=== Tenure ===
During the initial years of the post-independence IAF, CAS-appointees were given one four-year term, with the possibility of extension; Air Marshal Subroto Mukherjee was the longest serving chief – at 6 years, 7 months, 7 days, and the only appointee to have ever received a second four-year term; nevertheless, he unexpectedly died halfway through it.

Currently, according to the Regulations for the Air Force, 2000 – a CAS-appointee reaches superannuation upon the completion of three years in the position or at the age of 62, whichever is earlier. However, an appointee may also be dismissed from office by the President of India before the conclusion of the tenure under Section 18-19 of the Air Force Act, 1950 and Article 310 of the Constitution.

Additionally, a CAS-appointee is also eligible to be selected for the position of Chief of Defence Staff (CDS), in accordance with the Air Force (Amendment) Regulations, 2022 - which prescribes that the designated nominee, in this case the CAS, must be under the age of 62 at the time of appointment as CDS; as of 2024, no CAS-appointee has ever been appointed as CDS.

== History ==
=== Pre-independence era (1932–1947) ===
Since the establishment of the Indian Air Force (IAF) in October 1932 (later rechristened the Royal Indian Air Force (RIAF)), the organization's professional head bore the undermentioned designations:

- 1932–1938: Air Officer Commanding RAF, India
- 1938–1947: Air Officer Commanding-in-Chief, Air Forces in India

=== Dominion-era (1947–1950) ===
The selection of the first Commander-in-Chief of the Royal Indian Air Force was finalized in July 1947, following deliberations between the British and Indian leadership. Air Marshal Sir Thomas Elmhirst was appointed to the position, with the understanding that he would oversee the RIAF's transition to an independent service and mentor its emerging Indian leadership.

Upon independence and the subsequent partition of the subcontinent, RIAF India was bifurcated into two new entities: a successor Royal Indian Air Force (RIAF) - responsible for the Dominion of India, and the newly-formed Royal Pakistan Air Force (RPAF) - responsible for the Dominion of Pakistan. However, the former role of Air Officer Commanding-in-Chief, Air Forces in India was trifurcated into three positions:

- Air Marshal Commanding, Royal Indian Air Force
- Commander-in-Chief, Royal Pakistan Air Force
- Deputy Supreme Commander (Air) India and Pakistan

Whilst the RIAF and RPAF maintained their respective commanding officers, the Deputy Supreme Commander (Air), who worked for the Supreme Commander's Headquarters (Supreme HQ), acted as the overall coordinator for the two new air forces, under the additional title of Air Officer Commanding RAF Units in India and Pakistan. The role was disbanded in November 1947, following which India and Pakistan subsequently gained full organizational control of the RIAF and RPAF, respectively.

On 1 March 1948, the designation of the RIAF's commanding officer was rechristened as Chief of the Air Staff, and again to Chief of the Air Staff and Commander-in-Chief, Royal Indian Air Force (CAS/C-in-C, RIAF) on 21 June - as a measure to reflect uniformity with the C-in-Cs of the post-independence Indian Army and the Royal Indian Navy. Upon India's establishment as a republic on 26 January 1950, the RIAF was rechristened as the Indian Air Force (IAF), dropping the Royal-prefix; subsequently, the position's designation was again modified to Chief of the Air Staff and Commander-in-Chief, Indian Air Force (CAS/C-in-C, IAF). In the initial years after independence, up until 1950, the position was occupied by two air marshals seconded from the RAF, namely, Sir Thomas Walker Elmhirst and Sir Ronald Ivelaw-Chapman.

=== Republic-era (1950–present) ===
In 1954, Air Marshal Sir Gerald Ernest Gibbs, the IAF's third and then-serving CAS/C-in-C, and originally an RAF-secondment, retired; as a consequence, Air Vice Marshal Subroto Mukherjee - then the IAF's Deputy Chief of the Air Staff (DCAS), was promoted to rank of Air Marshal and succeeded him as the first native and first non-RAF C-in-C of the force. A year later, in 1955, the designation of C-in-C was shortened to simply Chief of the Air Staff (CAS) through the Commanders-In-Chief (Change in Designation) Act, 1955; as a result of the Act, Mukherjee's tenure continued under the new designation, making him the last C-in-C.

In January 2002, then-retired Air Chief Marshal Arjan Singh, the IAF's third CAS, was promoted to the five-star rank of Marshal of the Indian Air Force (MIAF), in recognition of his leadership during the 1965 Indo-Pakistani War - which made him the only CAS-appointee to have ever been promoted to the rank; his promotion occurred thirty-three years after his superannuation. To note, although the rank-holder of MIAF is nominally the highest-ranking officer in the IAF, the rank is all but titular with no operational duties attached, which leaves the CAS as the highest operationally-active officer in the IAF.

== Appointees ==
(**Seconded from the Royal Air Force)

=== Air Marshal Commanding, Royal Indian Air Force (1947–1948) ===
No.	Portrait	Name	Took office	Left office	Time in office
1	Sir Thomas Elmhirst CB, KBE, AFC**	Air Marshal; Sir Thomas Elmhirst CB, KBE, AFC** (1895–1982) (Note: Seconded from the Royal Air Force)	15 August 1947	20 June 1948	310 days

=== Chief of the Air Staff and Commander-in-Chief, Royal Indian Air Force (1948–1950) ===
No.	Portrait	Name	Took office	Left office	Time in office
1	Sir Thomas Elmhirst CB, KBE, AFC**	Air Marshal; Sir Thomas Elmhirst CB, KBE, AFC** (1895–1982)	21 June 1948	25 January 1950	1 year, 218 days

=== Chief of the Air Staff and Commander-in-Chief, Indian Air Force (1950–1955) ===
No.	Portrait	Name	Took office	Left office	Time in office
1	Sir Thomas Elmhirst KBE, CB, AFC**	Air Marshal; Sir Thomas Elmhirst KBE, CB, AFC** (1895–1982)	26 January 1950	23 February 1950	28 days
2	Sir Ronald Ivelaw-Chapman KBE, CB, DFC, AFC**	Air Marshal; Sir Ronald Ivelaw-Chapman KBE, CB, DFC, AFC** (1899–1978)	23 February 1950	9 December 1951	1 year, 289 days
3	Gerald Ernest Gibbs CIE, CBE, MC & Two Bars**	Air Marshal; Gerald Ernest Gibbs CIE, CBE, MC & Two Bars** (1896–1992)	10 December 1951	31 March 1954	2 years, 111 days
4	Subroto Mukerjee OBE	Air Marshal; Subroto Mukerjee OBE (1911–1960)	1 April 1954	31 March 1955	364 days

=== Chief of the Air Staff (1955–present) ===
No.	Portrait	Name	Took office	Left office	Time in office
4	Subroto Mukerjee OBE	Air Marshal; Subroto Mukerjee OBE (1911–1960)	1 April 1955	8 November 1960 †	5 years, 221 days
5	Aspy Merwan Engineer DFC	Air Marshal; Aspy Merwan Engineer DFC (1912–2002)	1 December 1960	31 July 1964	3 years, 243 days
6	Arjan Singh DFC	Air Chief Marshal (Note: Promoted to Marshal of the Indian Air Force in 2002.); Arjan Singh DFC (1919–2017)	1 August 1964	15 July 1969	4 years, 348 days
7	Pratap Chandra Lal DFC	Air Chief Marshal; Pratap Chandra Lal DFC (1916–1982)	16 July 1969	15 January 1973	3 years, 183 days
8	Om Prakash Mehra PVSM	Air Chief Marshal; Om Prakash Mehra PVSM (1919–2015)	16 January 1973	31 January 1976	3 years, 15 days
9	Hrushikesh Moolgavkar PVSM, MVC	Air Chief Marshal; Hrushikesh Moolgavkar PVSM, MVC (1920–2015)	1 February 1976	30 August 1978	2 years, 241 days
10	Idris Hasan Latif PVSM	Air Chief Marshal; Idris Hasan Latif PVSM (1923–2018)	1 September 1978	30 August 1981	3 years, 29 days
11	Dilbagh Singh PVSM, AVSM, VM	Air Chief Marshal; Dilbagh Singh PVSM, AVSM, VM (1926–2001)	1 September 1981	3 September 1984	3 years, 2 days
12	Lakshman Madhav Katre PVSM, AVSM	Air Chief Marshal; Lakshman Madhav Katre PVSM, AVSM (1926–1985)	3 September 1984	1 July 1985 †	301 days
13	Denis Anthony La Fontaine PVSM, AVSM, VM	Air Chief Marshal; Denis Anthony La Fontaine PVSM, AVSM, VM (1929–2011)	3 July 1985	31 July 1988	3 years, 28 days
14	Surinder Kumar Mehra PVSM, AVSM, VM	Air Chief Marshal; Surinder Kumar Mehra PVSM, AVSM, VM (1932–2003)	1 August 1988	31 July 1991	2 years, 364 days
15	Nirmal Chandra Suri PVSM, AVSM, VM, ADC	Air Chief Marshal; Nirmal Chandra Suri PVSM, AVSM, VM, ADC (born 1933)	31 July 1991	31 July 1993	2 years
16	Swaroop Krishna Kaul PVSM, MVC, ADC	Air Chief Marshal; Swaroop Krishna Kaul PVSM, MVC, ADC (1935–2025)	1 August 1993	31 December 1995	2 years, 152 days
17	Satish Kumar Sareen PVSM, AVSM, VM, ADC	Air Chief Marshal; Satish Kumar Sareen PVSM, AVSM, VM, ADC (born 1939)	31 December 1995	31 December 1998	3 years
18	Anil Yashwant Tipnis PVSM, AVSM, VM, ADC	Air Chief Marshal; Anil Yashwant Tipnis PVSM, AVSM, VM, ADC (born 1940)	31 December 1998	31 December 2001	3 years
19	Srinivasapuram Krishnaswamy PVSM, AVSM, VM	Air Chief Marshal; Srinivasapuram Krishnaswamy PVSM, AVSM, VM (born 1943)	31 December 2001	31 December 2004	3 years
20	Shashindra Pal Tyagi PVSM, AVSM, VM, ADC	Air Chief Marshal; Shashindra Pal Tyagi PVSM, AVSM, VM, ADC (born 1945)	31 December 2004	31 March 2007	2 years, 90 days
21	Fali Homi Major PVSM, AVSM, SC, VM, ADC	Air Chief Marshal; Fali Homi Major PVSM, AVSM, SC, VM, ADC (born 1947)	31 March 2007	31 May 2009	2 years, 61 days
22	Pradeep Vasant Naik PVSM, VSM, ADC	Air Chief Marshal; Pradeep Vasant Naik PVSM, VSM, ADC (born 1949)	31 May 2009	31 July 2011	2 years, 61 days
23	Norman Anil Kumar Browne PVSM, AVSM, VM, ADC	Air Chief Marshal; Norman Anil Kumar Browne PVSM, AVSM, VM, ADC (born 1951)	31 July 2011	31 December 2013	2 years, 153 days
24	Arup Raha PVSM, AVSM, VM, ADC	Air Chief Marshal; Arup Raha PVSM, AVSM, VM, ADC (born 1954)	31 December 2013	31 December 2016	3 years
25	Birender Singh Dhanoa PVSM, AVSM, YSM, VM, ADC	Air Chief Marshal; Birender Singh Dhanoa PVSM, AVSM, YSM, VM, ADC (born 1957)	31 December 2016	30 September 2019	2 years, 273 days
26	Rakesh Kumar Singh Bhadauria PVSM, AVSM, VM, ADC	Air Chief Marshal; Rakesh Kumar Singh Bhadauria PVSM, AVSM, VM, ADC (born 1959)	30 September 2019	30 September 2021	2 years
27	Vivek Ram Chaudhari PVSM, AVSM, VM, ADC	Air Chief Marshal; Vivek Ram Chaudhari PVSM, AVSM, VM, ADC (born 1962)	30 September 2021	30 September 2024	3 years
28	Amar Preet Singh PVSM, AVSM	Air Chief Marshal; Amar Preet Singh PVSM, AVSM (born 1964)	30 September 2024	31 October 2026	2 years, 31 days
29	Ashutosh Dixit PVSM, AVSM, VM, VSM	Air Chief Marshal; Ashutosh Dixit PVSM, AVSM, VM, VSM (born 1966)	31 October 2026	Incumbent	0 days

== See also ==
=== Other offices of the Indian Armed Forces ===
- Chief of Defence Staff
- Chairman of the Chiefs of Staff Committee
- Chief of Integrated Defence Staff
- Chief of the Army Staff
- Chief of the Naval Staff

=== History ===
- Marshal of the Indian Air Force
- List of serving air marshals of the Indian Air Force
