= India General Service Medal (1936) =

British campaign medal awarded for service on the North-West Frontier of Inidia

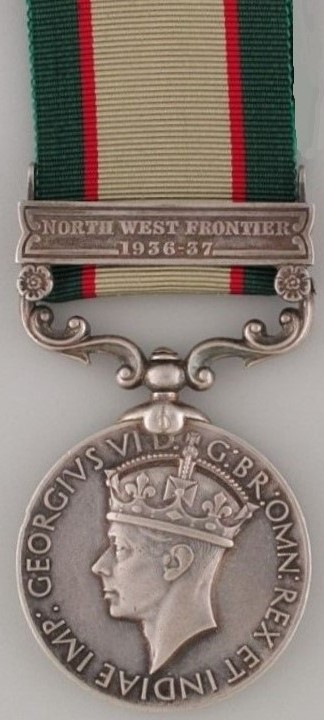
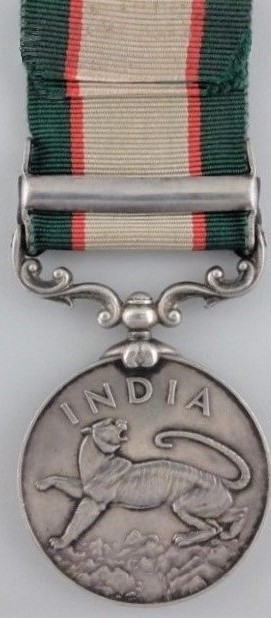
- Obverse and reverse of the medal
- Type: Campaign medal
- Awarded for: Campaign service.
- Description: Silver disk, 36mm diameter.
- Presented by: United Kingdom of Great Britain and Northern Ireland
- Eligibility: British and Indian forces.
- Campaign: India 1936–39.
- Clasps: North West Frontier 1936–37; North West Frontier 1937–39
- Established: 1938
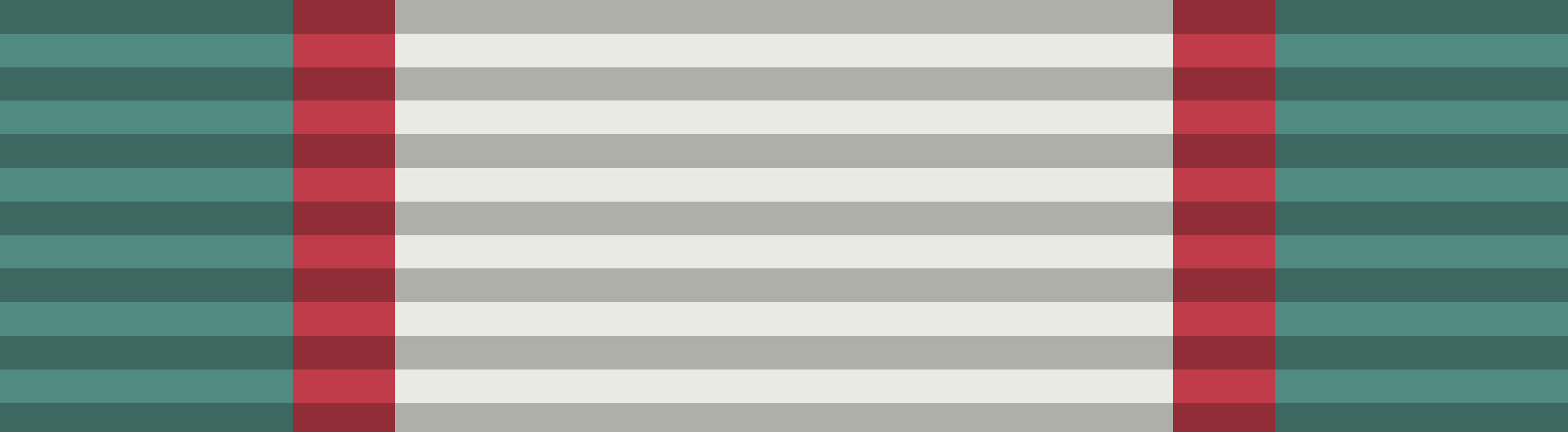
- Ribbon bar

The Indian General Service Medal (1936 IGSM) was a campaign medal approved on 3 August 1938, for issue to officers and men of the British and Indian armies, and of the Royal Air Force.

The 1936 IGSM was awarded for minor military campaigns on the North-West Frontier of India between 1936 and 1939. Each campaign covered by the medal was represented by a clasp on the ribbon; two were sanctioned, both relating to operations in Waziristan:

- North West Frontier 1936–37
- North West Frontier 1937–39

The second clasp was only struck and distributed after the Second World War. Recipients of a Mention in Despatches were entitled to wear an oak leaf emblem on the ribbon.

Following the grant of Indian Independence in 1947 the medal became obsolete, although it could still be worn in uniform by British, Indian and Pakistani servicemen.

== Description ==
The medal is silver, 36 millimetres (1.4 in) in diameter, and has the following design:
The obverse shows the crowned head of King George VI facing left with the inscription 'GEORGIVS VI D.G: BR OMN: REX ET INDIAE IMP:'. meaning "George the Sixth, by the Grace of God, King of all the Britains, and Emperor of India". The reverse depicts a side view of a tiger standing astride a mountain range with the word 'INDIA' above.
The 32 mm (1.3 in) wide ribbon is grey flanked by narrow red stripes, with broad green stripes at the edges

Medals were impressed on the edge with the name and details of the recipient.

The medal was struck at both the Calcutta and London mints, for Indian and British forces respectively. The claw mount attaching the medal disc to the suspension differs between the two, the Calcutta Mint version being of a plain curved style, while London made medals are of a more elaborate raised scroll type:

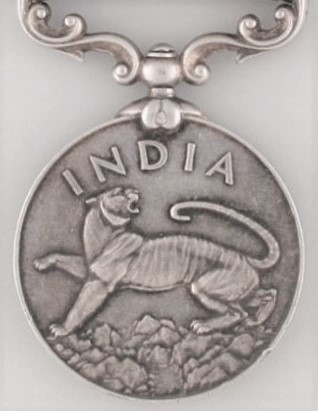
Calcutta Mint

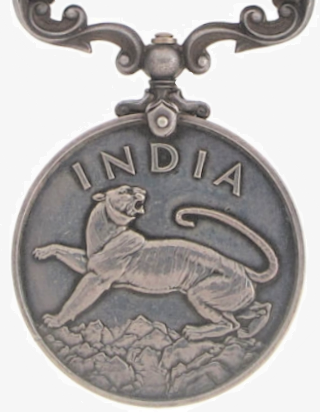
Royal Mint

== Bibliography ==
- Joslin, John W. (1973). Observer Book of British Awards and Medals. Frederick Warne & Co. ISBN 0723215383.
- Joslin, E. C.; Litherland, A. R.; Simpkin, B. T., eds. (1988). British Battles and Medals. Spink. ISBN 0907605257.
- Mussell, John, ed. (2014). Medals Yearbook – 2015. Token Publishing. ISBN 1908828161.
