= No. 1 Squadron IAF =

No. 1 Squadron The Tigers
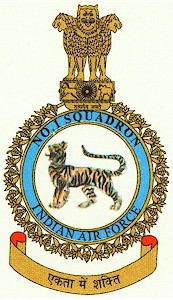
- Insignia of The No.1 Squadron IAF "Tigers"
- Active: 1 April 1933 – May 1947; February 1953 – Present
- Country: Republic of India
- Allegiance: Indian Armed Forces
- Branch: Indian Air Force
- Role: Air superiority Interdiction
- Base: AFS Gwalior
- Nickname: The Tigers
- Mottos: "एकता में शक्ति" (Hindi: "Strength in Unity")
- Engagements: Hur's Operations NWFP; Burma Campaign; Operation Polo; Western Air War, 1965; Liberation War, 1971; Kargil War; Operation Parakram

Commanders
- Current commander: Group Captain Hemant Kumar
- Notable commanders: Subroto Mukerjee; Arjan Singh; Dilbagh Singh

Insignia
- Identification symbol: A Royal Bengal Tiger

Aircraft flown
- Fighter: Dassault Mirage 2000

No. 1 Squadron nicknamed The Tigers the oldest squadron of the Indian Air Force operates as a multirole (air superiority and electronic warfare) unit. Part of the 40 Wing of the Indian Air Force under Central Air Command, it is based at AFB in Gwalior.

Gwalior has the Indian Air Force's elite Tactics and Air Combat Development Establishment (TACDE), a premier unit for advanced fighter pilot training in aerial tactics, focusing on operational doctrines and tactics for aircraft.

== History ==
No. 1 Squadron was established on 1 April 1933 at Drigh Road in Karachi, marking the operational commencement of the Indian Air Force. The initial unit, known as 'A' Flight, comprised six Indian officers who had completed their training at RAF College Cranwell in July 1932. These officers, including Subroto Mukerjee (later the first Indian Chief of Air Staff), underwent further training with No. 16 Squadron RAF and the Army Co-operation School before returning to India. Flight Lieutenant Cecil "Boy" Bouchier, a decorated World War I veteran, volunteered to lead this nascent unit. The squadron was equipped with four Westland Wapiti biplanes and operated from a newly constructed barracks at Drigh Road, affectionately named 'Gandhi Hill' by its occupants. This period laid the foundation for the Indian Air Force's evolution into a formidable air power.

In Sep 1937 the Squadron was inducted into operations in North West Frontier province. Mukerjee was awarded the India General Service Medal with the clasps 'North West Frontier 1936–37', and 'North West Frontier 1937–39'. He was one of the three flying officers of the three flights of No. 1 Squadron. On 15 February 1939, he was promoted to the rank of flight lieutenant. He took command of the No. 1 Squadron on 16 March 1939, the first Indian officer to command a squadron. In June 1939, under Mukerjee, the squadron converted to Hawker Hart aircraft with a few Hawker Audax aircraft in its inventory. He led the squadron into action at Miranshah Airfield in NWFP.

In June 1939, the Squadron was re-equipped with Hawker Hart aircraft. In 1942, the Imperial Japanese forces occupied Burma. No. 1 Squadron of the Royal Indian Air Force was posted to Burma, and Majumdar reached Taungoo with his squadron on 31 January 1942. On the very next day, the Imperial Japanese Army Air Force based in Mae Hong Son in Thailand bombed Taungoo, inflicting considerable damage. However, No. 1 Squadron, which had taken the precaution of dispersing and hiding their Lysanders, was unharmed. On one occasion Majumdar was forced down in the Shan jungles due to engine failure and managed to return to Lashio after a harrowing journey through dense forests. Majumdar was awarded the Distinguished Flying Cross, gazetted in the London Gazette of 10 November 1942. During the Battle of Imphal, The Tigers were tasked to provide close air support to the 17th Indian division. Arjan Singh led No. 1 Squadron into combat during the Arakan Campaign in 1944. He was awarded the Distinguished Flying Cross (DFC) in June 1944.

In 1947 during partition, No 1 RIAF Squadron was allocated to Pakistan. Pakistan Air Force did not continue the lineage. On 26 January 1953, No 15 Squadron was renumbered as No.1 Squadron, IAF at Halwara, with Spitfires on its inventory under the command of Squadron Leader EJ Dhatigara with the Tigers heritage. On 15 February 1957, No.1 Squadron was redesignated as No.27 Squadron. A new squadron was raised at Kalaikunda with the new Dassault Mystere-IVa aircraft. Squadron Leader Dilbagh Singh made the first official sonic boom over India in New Delhi when the Mystere IV-A was showcased in a public demonstration.

This Squadron took part in the 1961 operation for Annexation of Goa with Mystere-IVa aircraft. In 1963, the squadron had moved to Adampur. In recognition of their contribution during the Indo-Pakistani war of 1965, the squadron received 1 MVC(Posthumous) and 3 Vir Chakra awards. On 18 October 1968, the Tigers, were presented the President’s Colours. During the 1971 Indo-Pak War, the Tigers flew a total of 513 sorties. They received AVSM and 1 Vir Chakra award.The squadrom was relocated at Gorakhpur in Feb 1982. They moved further east, to Hashimara, in the eastern Dooars, in 1985. On 1 January 1986, the squadron moved to Gwalior and were equipped with Mirage-2000 aircraft. They have stayed there except for a temporary deployment to Ambala for Operation Safed Sagar.

During the Kargil War (Operation Vijay), No. 1 Squadron of the Indian Air Force operated the Dassault Mirage 2000 and was primarily assigned to air defence and escort duties within the conflict zone. The squadron played a crucial role in securing the airspace over Jammu and Kashmir by maintaining continuous combat air patrols and deterring any potential interference from opposing air assets.

A key responsibility of the squadron was to provide escort to strike formations tasked with offensive operations against entrenched enemy positions along the Line of Control. These escort missions involved protecting strike aircraft during ingress and egress phases, as well as providing beyond-visual-range (BVR) cover using air-to-air missiles such as the Super 530D. No. 1 Squadron aircraft frequently operated in coordinated packages alongside strike aircraft from other units, ensuring the integrity and safety of bombing missions carried out at high altitude.

The squadron also participated in complex multi-aircraft mission profiles that required coordination with other fighter types, including MiG-29 aircraft tasked with top cover. These missions typically involved rendezvous at pre-designated points, followed by joint ingress into the operational area. The presence of No. 1 Squadron aircraft allowed strike platforms to focus on ground attack objectives without exposure to aerial threats.

In addition to its operational flying role, the squadron contributed to the overall effectiveness of Mirage 2000 operations by supporting mission integration and logistics. Technical personnel associated with the squadron were involved in adapting available munitions for use on the Mirage platform under restrictive conditions, which enhanced the aircraft’s ground-attack capability during the conflict.

Over the course of the war, No. 1 Squadron flew approximately 274 operational sorties. While it was not primarily engaged in direct strike missions, its role in air superiority, escort, and mission support was essential to the success of offensive operations conducted by the Indian Air Force.

The squadron successfully test fired a BVR MICA missile from a Mirage-2000 aircraft on 24 September 2016.

== Aircraft ==
Aircraft	From	To	Air Base
Pre-Independence (1933–47)
Westland Wapiti IIA	May 1933	October 1941	Karachi
Hawker Audax	September 1939	December 1941	Peshawar
Harvard IIB	October 1945	September 1947	
Westland Lysander	September 1941	July 1942	
Hawker Hurricane Mk 1	October 1942	May 1943	Trichy
Hawker Hurricane Mk IIB	May 1943	August 1944	Trichy
Hawker Hurricane Mk IIC	July 1944	May 1946	Imphal
Harvard IIB	October 1945	May 1947	Peshawar
Spitfire VIII	December 1945	May 1947	Peshawar
Post-Independence (1953–Present)
Spitfire XVIII	February 1953	September 1953	AFS Halwara
Vampire FB52	March 1953	March 1957	AFS Palam
Dassault Mystère IVa	July 1957	1963	AFS Kalaikunda
Dassault Mystère IVa	1963	June 1966	AFS Adampur
MiG-21 FL	July 1966	February 1986	AFS Adampur
Dassault Mirage 2000	February 1986	Present	AFS Gwalior

== Commemorative Postal Stamp ==
Commemorative stamp was released by India Post in 1993.

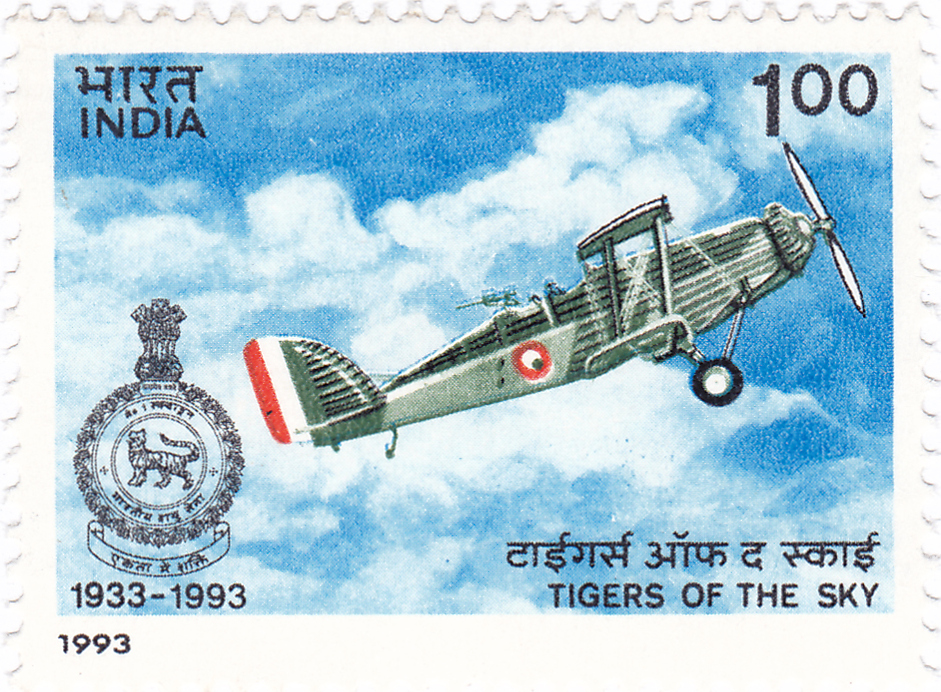
