= Air commodore (India) =

One-star rank in the Indian Air Force

Air Commodore
- Flag of Air commodore

- Shoulder board

- Rank insignia of an air commodore
- Country: India
- Service branch: Indian Air Force
- Abbreviation: Air Cmde
- Rank: One-star rank
- Next higher rank: Air vice marshal
- Next lower rank: Group Captain
- Equivalent ranks: Brigadier (Indian Army); Commodore (Indian Navy)

Air Commodore is a One-star rank (Deputy Director General) in the Indian Air Force. Air Commodore ranks above the rank of Group Captain and below the two-star rank of air vice marshal.

The equivalent rank in the Indian Army is brigadier and in the Indian Navy is Commodore.

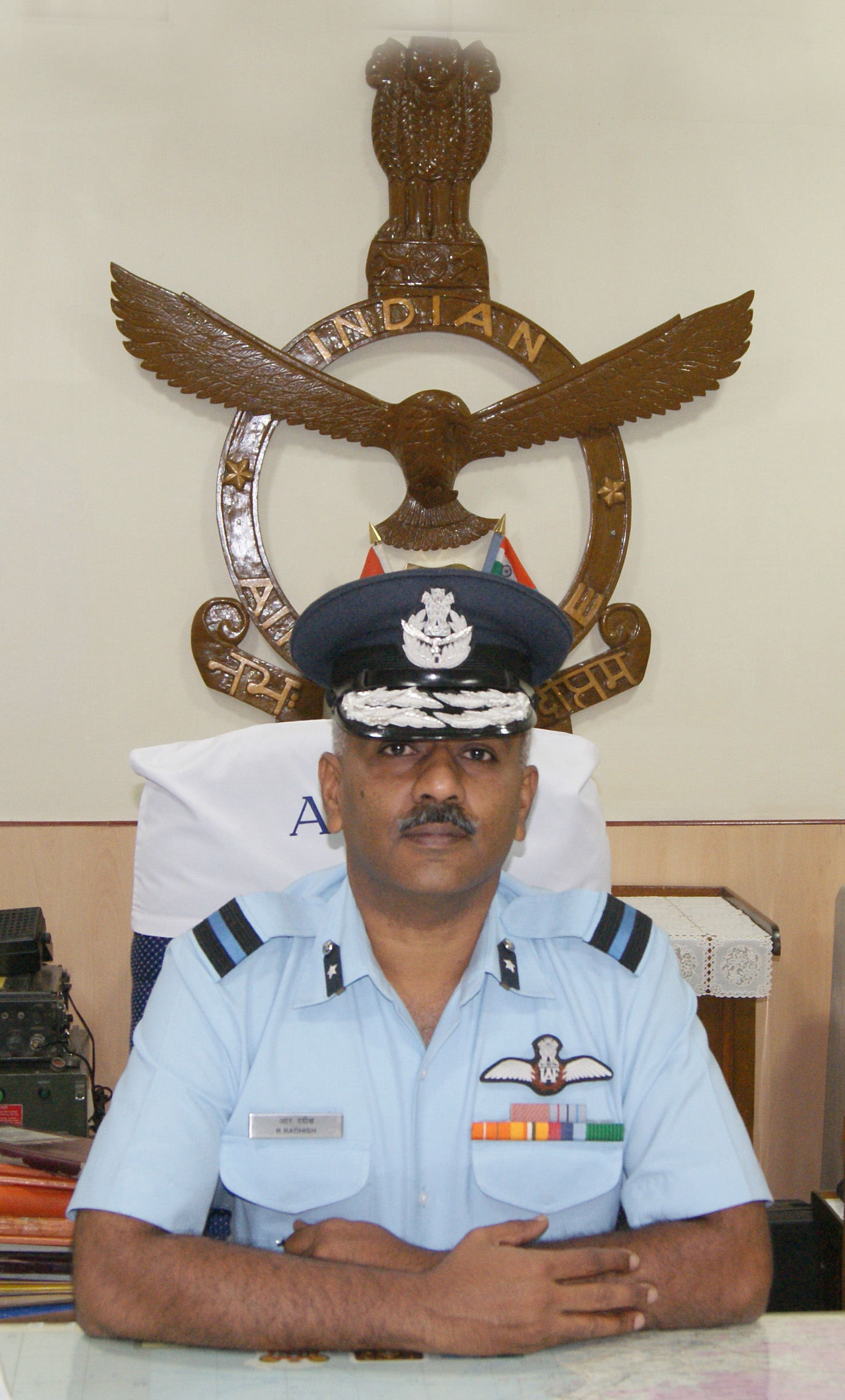
Air Cmde R. Radhish in an air commodore's uniform.

== History ==
On 15 May 1947, Subroto Mukerjee was promoted to the acting rank of Air Commodore and became the first Indian air officer. He was appointed the Deputy Assistant to the Air Officer-in-charge Administration at Air headquarters.

== Appointments ==
Officers in the rank of air commodore command air force stations and are titled air officer commanding (AOC). In staff appointments, they serve as Air-I at command headquarters. The air attachés and air advisors at India's high commissions and embassies in select countries are officers of the rank of air commodore. At Air headquarters, air commodores hold the appointments of principal directors of directorates and branches.

== Insignia ==
The flag of an Air commodore is sky blue with the Indian Air Force roundel surmounted by the eagle from the Indian Air Force badge, with one yellow star in the fly. The badges of rank consists of a sky blue band on a navy blue broad band. An air commodore wears gorget patches which are blue patches with one white star. In addition to this, the blue grey terrywool tunic has one sleeve stripe consisting of a broad band.

== Pay scale ==
Air commodores are at pay level 13A, with a monthly pay between ₹139,600 and ₹217,600 with a monthly service pay of ₹15,500.

== Rank insignia ==

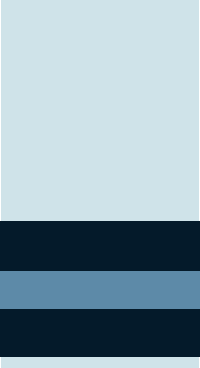

== See also ==
- Air Force ranks and insignia of India
