= PAF Base Kohat =

Pakistan Air Force military installation

- IATA: OHT; ICAO: OPKT

Summary
- Airport type: Military airbase
- Operator: Pakistan Air Force
- Location: Kohat, Khyber Pakhtunkhwa, Pakistan
- Elevation AMSL: 1,650 ft / 503 m
- Coordinates: 33°34′14″N 71°26′22″E

Map

Runways
Direction	Length		Surface
Direction	ft	m	Surface
14/32	7,717	2,352	Asphalt

PAF Base Kohat (IATA: OHT, ICAO: OPKT) is an airbase of the Pakistan Air Force (PAF) located in Kohat, Khyber Pakhtunkhwa, Pakistan. While it currently serves as a training base for PAF airmen, the facility was also used as a major operational base of the Royal Air Force during British colonial rule.

== History ==
In 1922, Royal Air Force Station Kohat was commissioned to meet the threats posed by tribesmen in the Northern and Western areas of the Frontier Province. RAF Kohat was one of three RAF stations in the area, the other being Peshawar and Risalpur. In the 1920s, Nos. 27 and 60 RAF Squadrons were based here with their Westland Wapitis. It served as the administrative wing and maintenance wing for fighter-bomber base. In 1925, the headquarters building, aircraft and supply hangars, Ml room, armory, and swimming pool were constructed in the base. In 1938, the No. 16 and No. 17 Squadrons were stationed in RAF Kohat. There was a rectangular grass landing field, which was expanded in 1939. However, the main hangar had to be demolished in order to expand the runway. RAF Kohat was also serviced by a control tower, which was called the 'watch office'. An officer's mess was constructed, and officers had their own horses. To accommodate the animals, a stables was constructed beside the officer's mess.

=== World War II ===
When World War II began, the airfield served as a major staging post for RAF and Indian Air Force squadrons during their deployment to the Burma front. On 19 December 1943, Field Marshal Sir Claude Auchinleck visited the station and inspected a guard of honor formed by IAF airmen.

Following the independence of Pakistan in 1947, all RAF units were withdrawn and PAF Base Kohat was only commanded by Pakistani officers from then on. The airfield served as a flying base with an additional training function. In 1961, the No. 9 (Fury) Squadron was withdrawn and the base ceased its dual function in 1963. Afterwards, it has become a primary training base.

== Notable incidents ==
- On 20 February 2003, Air Chief Marshal Mushaf Ali Mir and 16 others were killed when their Fokker F27 crashed into the hills near the airbase. The aircraft was inbound to Kohat from PAF Base Nur Khan. Among the deceased were two Air Vice-Marshals and Mir's wife.
- On 6 August 2007, two Pakistan Air Force personnel and a child accompanying them were injured when a bomb exploded near their vehicle on Kohat Road, near the PAF airbase.
