= Vinod Bhatia =

Indian air marshal (born 1942)

Air Marshal Vinod Bhatia PVSM, AVSM, VrC**
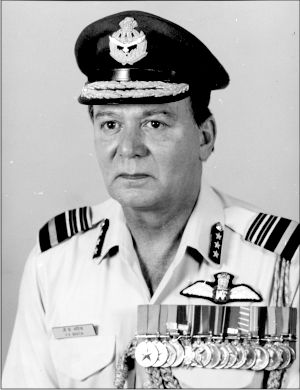
- Born: 5 October 1942 (age 84); Mardan, North-West Frontier Province, British Raj (now Mardan, Khyber Pakhtunkwa, Pakistan)
- Alma mater: University of Rajasthan; National Defence Academy; Defence Services Staff College; Royal College of Defence Studies
- Military career
- Allegiance: India
- Branch: Indian Air Force
- Service years: 1962–2002
- Rank: Air Marshal
- Nickname: Jimmy
- Service number: IC-6497
- Units: No. 47 Squadron; No. 29 Squadron; No. 8 Squadron; No. 37 Squadron; No. 32 Squadron
- Commands: No. 220 Squadron; Leh Air Base; Srinagar Air Base; Central Air Command; South Western Air Command; Western Air Command
- Awards: Param Vishisht Seva Medal; Ati Vishisht Seva Medal; Vir Chakra (Bar)

Air Marshal Vinod K. Bhatia (born 1942), PVSM, AVSM, VrC and Bar is a retired Indian Air Force (IAF) officer. He is also known by his nickname 'Jimmy'. He was awarded the Vir Chakra during both the 1965 and 1971wars, and thus became one of only five IAF officers to ever receive this honor.

Bhatia was born in 1942 to a police officer in Mardan, now located in Pakistan. All three of his brothers and his mother died during the Partition of India; he and his father then settled in the Indian state of Rajasthan. He was commissioned into the IAF in 1962 after graduating from the National Defence Academy. In 1963, Bhatia along with other Indian Air Force officers trained with the United States Air Force. He received the Top Gun medal during this training period. Bhatia executed strategic bombing and reconnaissance missions during the 1965 and 1971 wars, for which he received the two Vir Chakras.

From 1974 to 1976, Bhatia was stationed in Kut to train Iraqi Air Force pilots on flying the Sukhoi Su-7. After graduating from the Defence Services Staff College, Bhatia commanded No. 220 Squadron while it was inducting the Mikoyan-Gurevich MiG-23. He also commanded Leh Airbase after Operation Meghdoot, and Srinagar Airbase during the violent Kashmir insurgency. Bhatia then served as the commander of three air commands from 1997 to 2002; namely the Central Air Command, South Western Air Command and Western Air Command. In 2002, an Antonov An-32 piloted by Bhatia almost crashed after it briefly crossed the international border into Pakistan and was hit by a Stinger missile. He retired the same year, having accumulated almost 5,000 flying hours on 16 different aircraft platforms.

== Early life and education ==
Vinod Bhatia was born on 5 October 1942 in Mardan, a city in the North-West Frontier Province of British India. He had three elder sisters and three younger brothers. His father Ram Chander Bhatia was a police officer in Peshawar. The Partition of India in 1947 was traumatic for the family; Bhatia’s mother and all three of his brothers died during the migration to India. His father was incorporated into the Indian Police Service in the state of Rajasthan. Bhatia passed his Matriculation exams at the University of Rajasthan when he was 13.5 years old. After studying for one year at the Maharaja College, Jaipur; Bhatia joined the National Defence Academy when he was 15.

== Career ==
Bhatia was commissioned as an Indian Air Force (IAF) officer on 26 May 1962 and received a medal from the Chief of the Air Staff for being the best ranked student. Bhatia was sent to the Kalaikunda Air Force Station, home to No. 47 Squadron which flew the Dassault Ouragan. From 1962 to 1969, Bhatia accumulated a total of 250 hours of flying on the Ouragan, primarily during his deployments with No. 47 and No. 29 Squadrons at the Hasimara Air Force Station and Tezpur Airport.

After completing just a year as an officer, Bhatia was sent to train with the United States Air Force. He was one of 82 officers chosen for this training course, as he met the selection criteria of more than 200 and less than 300 hours of flying. The officers first went to Lackland Air Force Base in Texas for a month of training with the Royal Air Force. They then trained at Randolph Air Force Base (also in Texas) on Lockheed T-33 trainer aircraft. The pilots flew a total of 14 hours each on the T-33, divided into 90-minute long sorties. The pilots then trained at Nellis Air Force Base in Nevada, flying both the T-33s and the North American F-86 Sabres. Bhatia was one of three Indian officers who received the Top Gun award at the end of the course, the other two being Dadoo Subaiya and V. Vidyadhar.

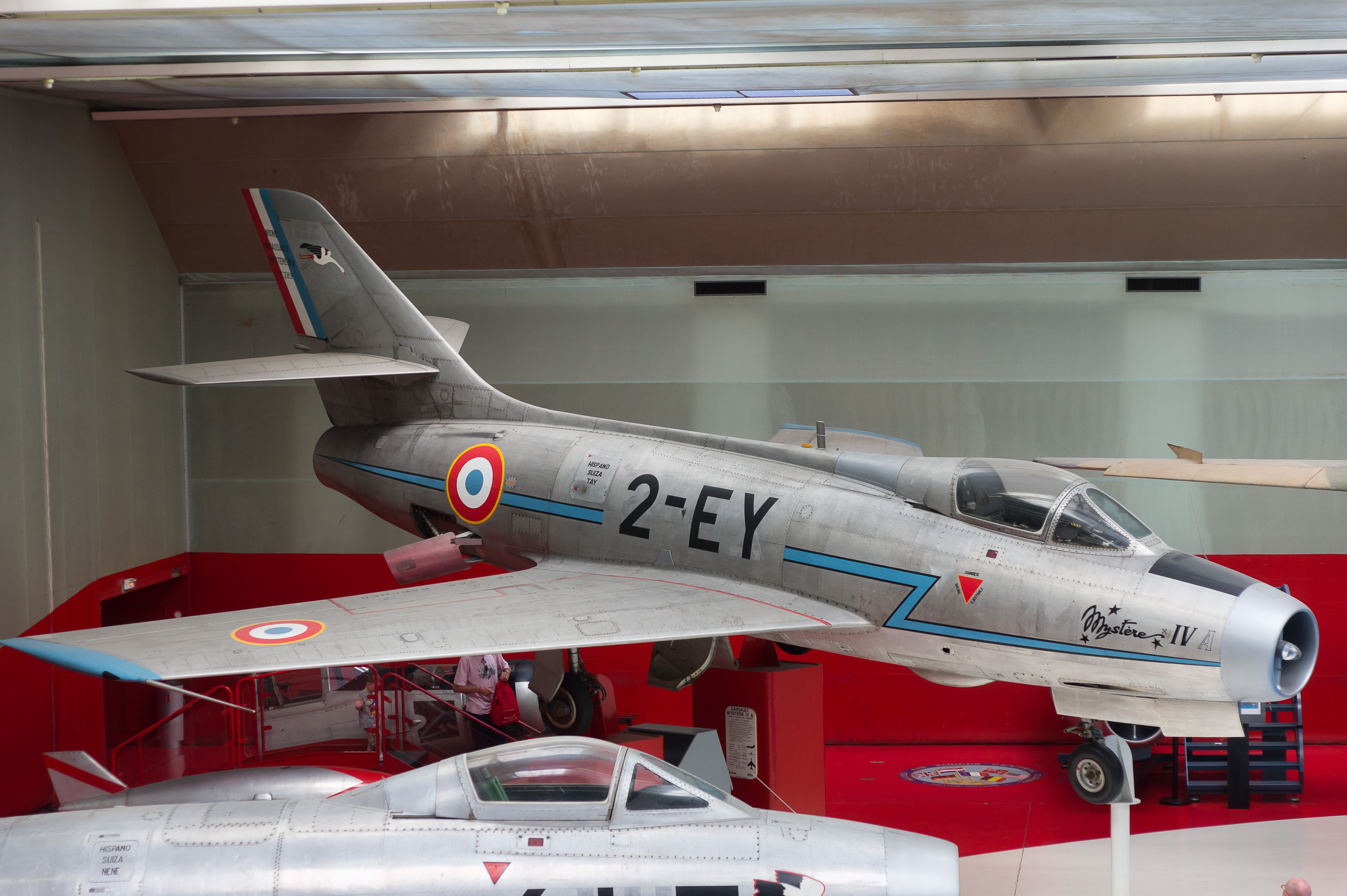
A Dassault Mystère IV on display at the Musée de l'air et de l'espace in France

Bhatia returned to India and was assigned to No. 8 Squadron which flew the Dassault Mystère IV. No. 8 Squadron was based at Adampur Airport and Ambala Air Force Station. Bhatia served with No. 8 Squadron from April 1964 to August 1966, and flew for almost 500 hours on the Mystère there. Bhatia was awarded his first Vir Chakra while serving with No. 8 Squadron during the Indo-Pakistani war of 1965. During his first combat mission, he targeted Pakistani armoured cavalry near Dera Baba Nanak with SNEB rockets on 6 September 1965. The next day, he targeted Bhagtanwala airfield located east of Sargodha. On 8 September 1965, Bhatia was flying the second aircraft in a formation of four Mystère aircraft, dispatched on a mission to attack ground targets. Confronted by intense and targeted gunfire, he continued attacking Pakistani tanks and artillery, wrecking two of their tanks in the process. He was awarded the Vir Chakra for the 18 sorties he flew in the strategic Lahore area, where he hit multiple targets.

Eight pilots of No. 8 Squadron bombed Bhagtanwala airfield; Bhatia and Vinod Patney were part of the first squad of this formation. The formation reached Bhagtanwala without being detected by the radar at PAF Base Sakesar. The formation met with low visibility but managed to destroy two F-86 Sabres. After flying over the airfield again and bombing it, they returned to India. However, the pilots thought they should have participated in a second attack on Sargodha to inflict more damage. From 1966 to 1967, Bhatia was a Pilot Attack Instructor (PAI), the Indian equivalent of a US Top Gun instructor. From 1956 to 1970, fewer than 200 pilots became PAIs. In 1968, Bhatia flew Hawker Hunter aircraft with No. 37 Squadron. In 1969, he switched to flying the Sukhoi Su-7 with No. 32 Squadron based in Ambala. He served with No. 32 Squadron till 1972. Before the Indo-Pakistani war of 1971 had even started, Bhatia had flown 5 sorties against targets in Pakistan. He flew these sorties on 23 and 31 October, and on 9, 10 and 30 November. During these sorties, he targeted Domeil bridge, the Mirpur region, Rahim Yar Khan and Fort Abbas; flying from Pathankot Airport, Adampur, Jaisalmer Airport (twice) and the Sirsa Air Force Station respectively.

On the evening of 3 December 1971, Bhatia and wing commander MS Grewal were the only two pilots present at Amritsar Air Force Station when it was bombed by Pakistani Dassault Mirage aircraft. On 4 December, No. 32 Squadron arrived in Amritsar from Ambala and began operating. On 4 and 5 December, Bhatia commanded three air strikes on PAF Base Rafiqui in Shorkot. The pilots who were part of the first echelon during the 4 December raid were Bhatia, Vijay Vasant Tambay, MS Grewal and AV Sathaye. The 4 December raid was the first cross-border mission for all these pilots. These pilots were part of the 4th Mobile Echelon Maintenance Unit (4 MEMU, later the 1st Forward Base Support Unit) based in Amritsar. The 1971 war provided the IAF the chance to validate the MEMU operational structure, and it performed remarkably. Eight Su-7s took off from Ambala at dawn, and they were refueled and armed at Amritsar. A standard Su-7 drop tank can carry 700 liters (180 U.S. gal) of fuel. However, Shorkot was located at quite a long distance from Amritsar, and therefore the Su-7s had to be fitted with drop tanks which could carry 900 liters (240 U.S. gal) of fuel. These fuel tanks added to the range of the aircraft, but made them a little unstable and limited their maneuverability.

The weapons fitted onto the Su-7s were 16 UB-16 rockets on both outer wings, for a total of 32 UB-16 rockets. When the Su-7s were being readied for their mission, some Pakistani MiG-19s flew over Amritsar airbase, and were repelled by the anti-aircraft guns stationed there. The Su-7s were ready for takeoff by 0930 hours, and the scheduled time for hitting their target was 1045 hours. Bhatia was surprised when their formation was not attacked as they flew over multiple Pakistani airbases on their way. Bhatia's formation attacked PAF Rafiqui successfully, and their confirmed hits were one English Electric Canberra bomber, a bowser tanker and three F-86 Sabres. To verify the effectiveness of this bombing raid, Indian fighter pilot Harcharan Singh Manget flew a high-speed photographic reconnaissance mission.

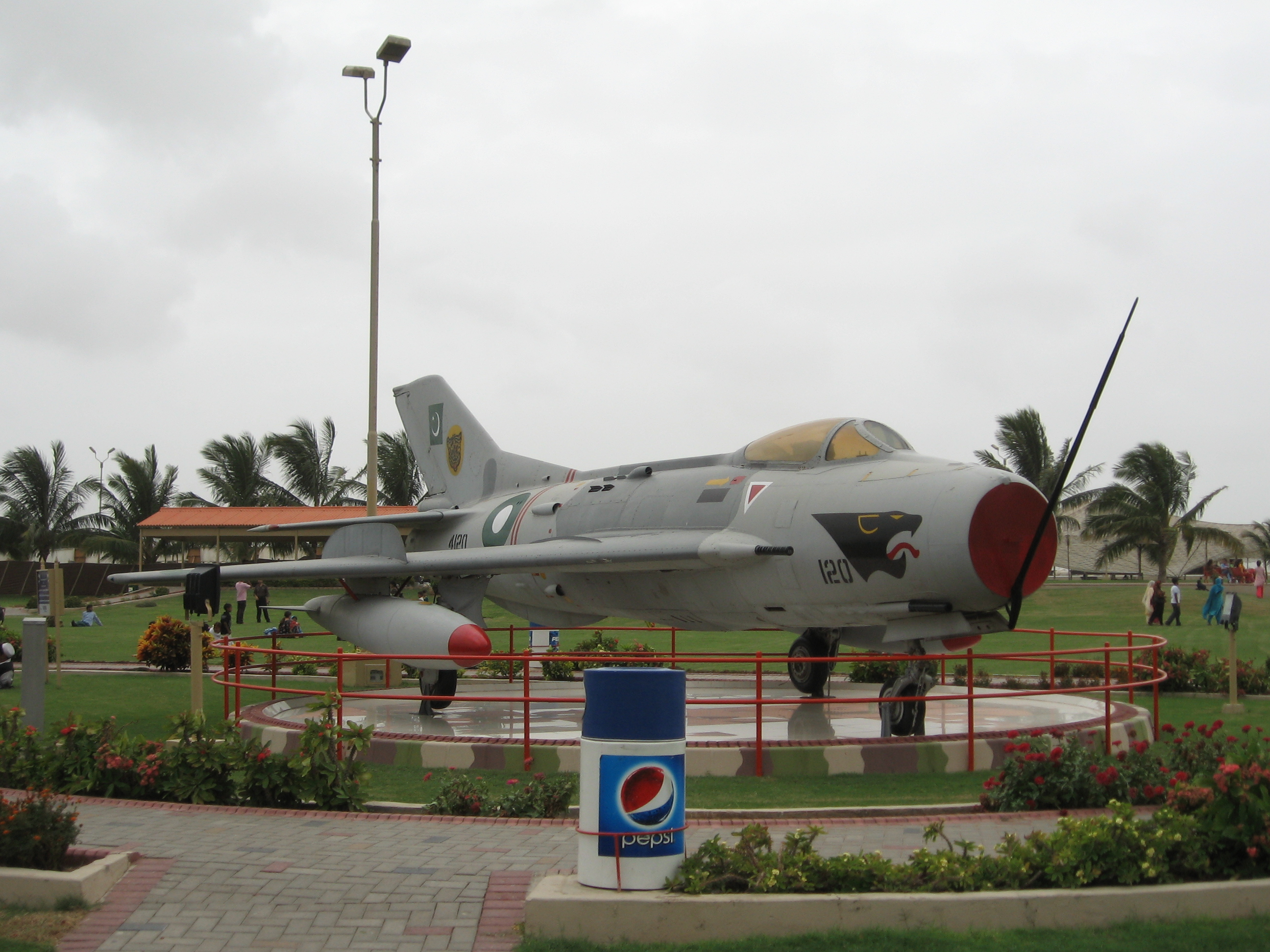
An example of a Pakistani F-6 based on the Shenyang J-6

For the 5 December raid, only two aircraft could be used because of the scarcity of long-distance drop tanks. Bhatia selected Tambay to be the second pilot on the mission, because Tambay had come back from the 4 December raid without having to drop his fuel tank. The two pilots started bombing Rafiqui base at 1345 hours (1:45 PM local time). When their mission had almost ended, Bhatia learned the Shenyang J-6 aircraft they had bombed near the hangars were dummies. Bhatia released his rockets on the hangars and returned to team up with Tambay, who was targeting the aircraft circuit area by then.

An afternoon strike was decided upon because it was believed Pakistani air defenses would be inactive during lunchtime. However, 100 anti-aircraft guns were deployed at Rafiqui base after the destructive 4 December raid. Tambay was hit by one of these guns during the second round of bombing and his plane crashed on the runway, Bhatia asked him to eject but received no response. MS Grewal was also shot down during this raid, but he was later repatriated. Tambay's Sukhoi, number B837, dipped towards the runway and then exploded. Bhatia fired all his ammunition at the Operational Readiness Platform (ORP) and returned to the base alone. Tambay and 53 other Indian defense personnel who went missing in Pakistan were never officially found, they were reported missing in action but most probably died as prisoners of war in Pakistan.

On 14 December 1971, Bhatia was the second pilot sent on a mission to bomb the Government House at Dhaka (now the Old High Court Building, Dhaka). Bhupendra Kumar Bishnoi led the mission, and the other pilots were KS Raghavachari and PS Malhi. Bishnoi was first ordered by Group Captain (later Air Marshal) Malcolm Wollen to attack the Circuit House in Dhaka; Wollen said the mission was ordered by Air Headquarters Delhi. A formation of four aircraft (unnamed), armed with 32 rockets each, was assigned for the task. When the formation was about to take off, Wollen ordered the target be changed from the Circuit House to the Government House. Bishnoi did not inform the other three pilots about the changed target till they had reached Dhaka. Bhatia was the first pilot to sight the target. The formation bombed the target over two rounds and hit it with 128 rockets; two days later, the war ended.

Bhatia put three F-86 Sabres out of service during the bombing raids on PAF Rafiqui. He was awarded the bar to his Vir Chakra for this action, and thus became one of just five Indian Air Force officers to have ever received this honor. The four other IAF officers who have received the Vir Chakra Bar are BK Bishnoi, AIK Suares, PL Dhawan and Vinod Neb. Bishnoi, Neb and Bhatia received their Vir Chakra Bars for actions during the 1971 war. Bhatia was one of the flight commanders of a fighter bomber squadron during the war. His Vir Chakra citation says he mounted many strategic reconnaissance missions in Pakistani territory, commanded three airstrikes on heavily defended airbases, executed interdictions of Pakistani communication lines and provided close air support to the Indian Army. His citation further says he damaged three Pakistani aircraft and multiple Pakistani military assets. However, two of the three aircraft lost by No. 32 Squadron in the 1971 war were lost to anti-aircraft guns during the 5 December raid on Shorkot, which was commanded by Bhatia.

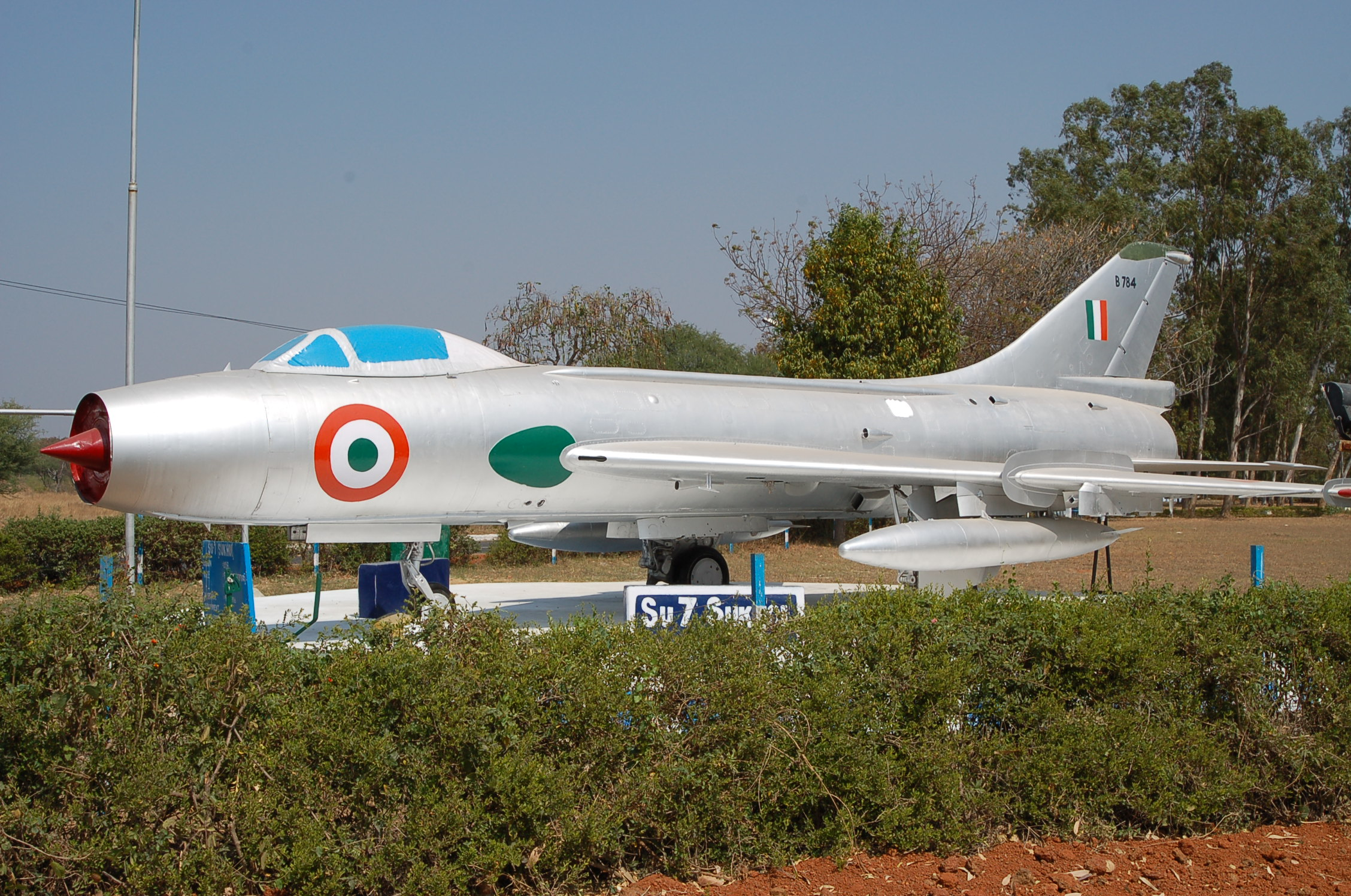
A Sukhoi Su-7 on display at the Museum of the Air Force Academy (India) in Dundigal

Bhatia also flew two risky single aircraft missions during the war, and managed to comprehensively photograph PAF Base Chaklala and PAF Base Murid. From 1974 to 1976, he was deployed to Kut to train Iraqi Air Force pilots on the Su-7, even though he was not a Qualified Flying Instructor. Bhatia clocked a total of 1290 hours on the Su-7, the most hours on a Su-7 by an Indian pilot. He completed his staff college studies at the Defence Services Staff College in 1977. In 1981, as a wing commander, Bhatia became the commander of No. 220 Squadron, which primarily flew the HAL HF-24 Marut. No. 220 was the second squadron after No. 10 Squadron to induct the Mikoyan-Gurevich MiG-23, and Bhatia commanded the squadron during this time. He led No. 220 Squadron for 2.5 years. From 1984 to 1987, Bhatia was the Chief Operations Officer of the Leh Air Base, when fighter jets were being deployed there after Operation Meghdoot and the ensuing Indian capture of the Siachen Glacier.

Bhatia was promoted to the rank of air commodore in 1988 at the age of 46. Starting from 1990, he commanded Srinagar Airbase during the violent Kashmir insurgency. For keeping the base ready for operations during such volatile conditions, Bhatia was awarded the Ati Vishisht Seva Medal on 11 April 1992. In 1992, he studied at the Royal College of Defence Studies in Britain. From December 1997 to April 2002, Bhatia served as the Air Officer Commander-in-Chief (AoC-in-C) of three air commands. Bhatia served as the AoC-in-C of Central Air Command (CAC) during the Kargil War. On 26 January 1998, Bhatia was awarded the Param Vishisht Seva Medal. Anil Yashwant Tipnis, the air chief during the Kargil War, says Bhatia motivated pilots of the Mikoyan-Gurevich MiG-25 to photograph and reconnaissance enemy positions. Tipnis says Bhatia did this when the MiG-25 was considered very risky to fly and not even useful for those tasks. Bhatia flew in the aircraft during the trials to encourage pilots and crew.

Bhatia served as the AoC-in-C of South Western Air Command (SWAC) from 1 November 1999 to 31 July 2001, succeeding Air Marshal Srinivasapuram Krishnaswamy. On 1 August 2001, Bhatia was appointed the AoC-in-C of Western Air Command (WAC), again succeeding Krishnaswamy. Air Marshal Michael McMahon succeeded Bhatia as the AoC-in-C of SWAC. On the same day, in his capacity as SWAC commander, Bhatia inaugurated the Phalodi Air Force Station, located approximately 150 kilometres (93 mi) from Jodhpur. On 27 November 2001, after two years of trials, WAC inducted the Mikoyan MiG-29 at Leh Air Base, located 3,350 metres (10,990 ft) above sea level. Bhatia said the MiG-29s at the airbase would give India more access to Central Asia.

=== An-32 incident ===
On 19 February 2002, Bhatia flew an Antonov An-32 into Pakistan administered Kashmir (PaK) airspace for 11 minutes while flying the first An-32 flight to Kargil Airport. Bhatia was the chief pilot, Wing Commander Suryakant Chintaman Chafekar was the co-pilot, and Flight lieutenant V. Awasthy was the navigator. While attempting a landing at Kargil, Bhatia probably flew close to the Line of Control (LoC) and a Pakistani missile hit the An-32. To rebalance the aircraft and gain altitude, Bhatia flew over the LoC. Bhatia later blamed Awasthy and Chafekar for not warning him when the An-32 flew towards the LoC. According to Chafekar, Bhatia was not qualified to fly the An-32, but still wanted to fly it to Kargil Airbase for its inaugural flight. The usual approach to Kargil involved flying over Leh and attempting a landing at Kargil only after spotting the runway. However, according to Chafekar, Bhatia directly turned left from Leh and started descending to save time. Chafekar also says Bhatia wanted to land at Kargil even after being hit by a Pakistani missile. Chafekar says the missile hit the aircraft at a fortunate angle; any lower and it would have struck the fuselage, any higher and it would have torn off the aircraft’s wings.

The An-32 was deployed by No. 48 Squadron, another news report says it was deputed by No. 25 Squadron. Initially, it was reported two Dassault Mirage 2000 were accompanying the An-32 and they did not enter PaK airspace. However, another news report says Bhatia leaked this story and his claim of being hit by Indian gunfire to avoid blame. Bhatia would not have been rebuked, but his claim of Indian gunfire hitting the An-32 angered the Indian Army, who asked for an inquiry. This inquiry was chaired by Manjit Singh Sekhon, the AoC-in-C of Southern Air Command (SAC). Bhatia was then transferred from command of WAC to the post of inspector general. This was considered a demotion since the WAC commander was only junior to the chief of air staff (CAS) in rank and power. Bhatia was indeed the second highest ranked officer in the Indian Air Force at the time, with the highest ranked officer being Srinivasapuram Krishnaswamy, then the CAS. According to Indian newspaper The Tribune, Krishnaswamy was unhappy with the government's order to establish a court of inquiry for the accident.

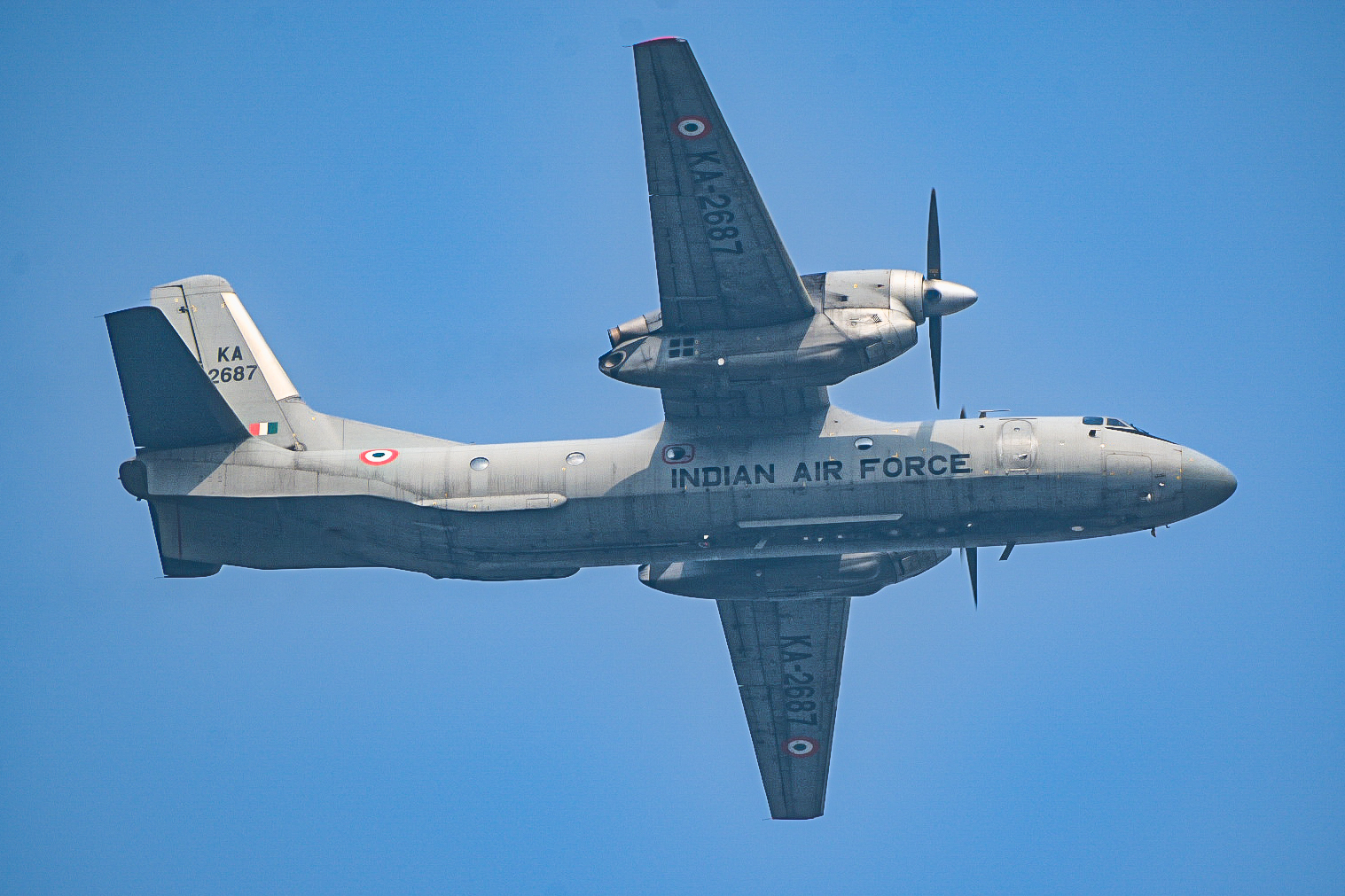
An Antonov An-32 of the Indian Air Force

In an interview, Sekhon claimed Indian Army personnel saw the An-32 fly over the Indus River in Batalik. Sekhon says eight officers and 50 soldiers then saw a Pakistani missile hit the An-32's right wing, which did not crash and instead landed at Leh. Sekhon claims there was political pressure on him to report the An-32 did not stray into PaK airspace and was hit inside Indian airspace. Sekhon further claims a controversy was manufactured against him in order to divert political and public attention away from the An-32 incident. According to Indian journalist Praveen Swami, Bhatia didn't heed the advice given by the other pilots on board the An-32, which was then hit by a Pakistani surface to air missile that burnt the engine of the aircraft. Swami claimed Bhatia tried to deflect blame by saying he was hit by Indian gunfire; however, Tipnis says the incident was pilot error. In an article, anonymous senior officers said Bhatia might have mistaken the Indus river for the Suru river and flown into PaK airspace. The Suru river's course is followed by Indian pilots to land safely in Kargil.

Swami further says a border conflict could have started had the An-32 crashed. The report prepared during Sekhon’s inquiry was not published. Bhatia requested his matter be investigated again, partly because Sekhon asked a politician to appoint him instead of Bhatia as WAC commander. In April 2002, the IAF discovered another secret investigation established by Bhatia and led by Air Commodore VS Govindarajan. This investigation was shut down after the growing controversy split senior officers into two camps supporting either Bhatia or Sekhon. Arjan Singh, the Marshal of the IAF, and former CAS Satish Sareen asked the IAF community to move on from the incident. Singh said flying near the LoC was difficult, and the community should therefore not dwell upon the issue. There was another controversy raging at the time because Sekhon was junior to Bhatia, and a junior officer is not allowed to investigate a senior officer. Another controversy erupted when Lieutenant General Harwant Singh published his article on the crisis. Singh was accused by Punjab politician Simranjit Singh Mann of favoring Bhatia and tarnishing Sekhon. Singh replied by saying he did not know Bhatia at all, and actually had family relations with Sekhon.

According to the Indian newspaper The Telegraph, Bhatia shouldn’t have flown the An-32 for the first flight to Kargil, and instead should have flown the fighter jets he was accustomed to. This is because the An-32 is bulky and slow, and landing in Kargil is tough. Major General Rashid Qureshi, military spokesperson for Pakistan's president, said the An-32 was fired at when it entered PaK airspace, and then fired at again when it returned to Indian airspace. According to The Telegraph, both Bhatia and Sekhon were not being considered for promotion to the rank of CAS even before the incident. Bhatia was scheduled to retire in October 2002. In another article, The Telegraph claimed the An-32 was hit by a FIM-92 Stinger missile, which has a range of 3.5 to 4 kilometres (2.2 to 2.5 mi). Indian Air Force aircraft usually fly 5 kilometres (3.1 mi) away from the LoC when flying to Kargil, but Kargil itself is located just 3.5 kilometres (2.2 mi) away from the LoC. The Telegraph also questioned whether the An-32 either did not have or did not release thermal rounds to divert the heat seeking Stinger missiles.

Arjun Ray, the commander of XIV Corps, said Bhatia crossed the LoC and was hit by Pakistani fire before the inquiry was 'scfindings oere released was reprimanded for this action by Sundararajan Padmanabhan, then the Chief of the Army Staff, on the orders of George Fernandes, then the Minister of Defence. On March 7, Bhatia flew another An-32 from No. 48 Squadron to Kargil with Chafekar as his co-pilot and Awasthy as his navigator. According to a news report, this flight was attempted to reinforce the air force's reputation after the 19 February incident, with the same crew deputed. Chafekar says he was asked to modify his testimony, and again pin the blame on himself after the 7 March flight returned safely from Kargil. In May 2002, Air Marshal Adi Rustomji Ghandhi succeeded Bhatia as the AoC-in-C of WAC. In November 2002, Air Marshal Ashok Goel succeeded Bhatia as the Inspector General of Inspection and Flight Safety.

=== Chafekar's account ===
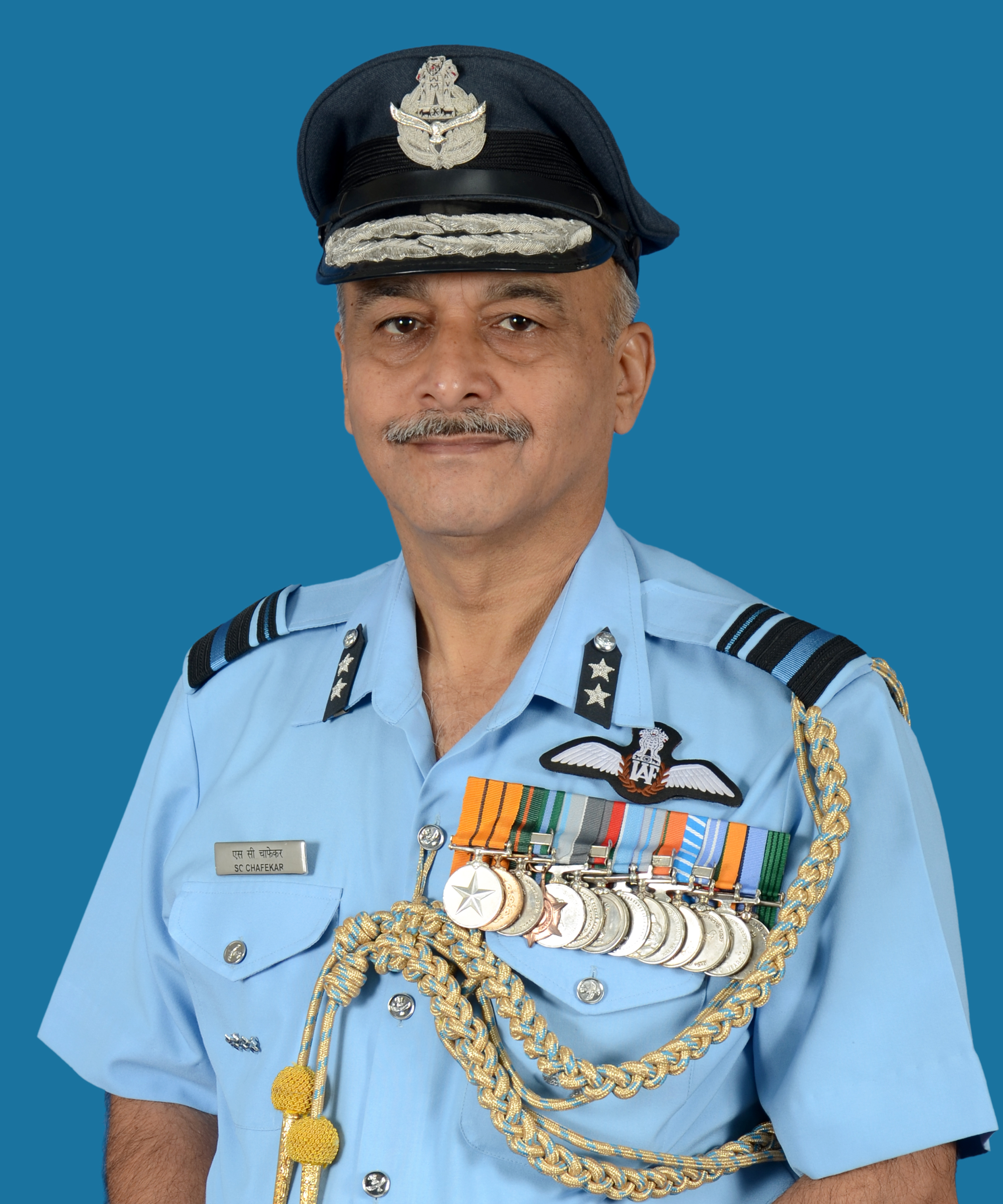
Suryakant Chintaman Chafekar, Bhatia's copilot on the An-32 flight which was damaged near Kargil

Bhatia's co-pilot SC Chafekar has recounted his version of events in his autobiography. Chafekar says he had executed two test landings at Kargil and had not flown there for 9 months before the incident. Chafekar's commanding officer told him Bhatia did not want to be a passenger, instead, Bhatia wanted to be seen descending from the cockpit to commission the new runway. Chafekar briefed Bhatia on the mission and the aircraft, but Bhatia did not pay attention and said he had flown MiG aircraft in the region many times. Before takeoff, Bhatia said he wanted to reach Kargil on time. The usual course was to fly over Delhi, Chandigarh, Leh, Fotu La and then land at Kargil. Bhatia did not fly over Leh and flew directly to Fotu La, and then started descending towards Kargil without contacting the base and flying the usual aircraft circuit. Chafekar told Bhatia it would be impossible to spot the runway and land without radioing the base due to the intense snowfall in the area. Bhatia refused.

Navigation then became much more difficult because the aircraft was flying low, which reduced the field of vision at a time when the surroundings were completely covered with snow. The navigator was also flying his maiden flight to Kargil. Chafekar tried to convince Bhatia to gain height because the hilly terrain made it tough for dead reckoning, a method used to determine positions using landmarks. The An-32 had already come down to 16,500 feet (5,000 m) without reaching Fotu La. Chafekar says they had entered unfamiliar areas by then, after which they spotted Kargil at a great distance to the left. Chafekar turned the An-32 left, but it was then hit and started flying aimlessly. The aircraft control system warned of an engine fire, so Chafekar shut down the engine and turned on the fire extinguisher within the engine. The flight engineer was asked to survey the aircraft from the cargo compartment to sight the fire, which was blazing on the right wing. Chafekar untethered the fuel pumps to the engine and the fire stopped spreading. Chafekar decided to regain control of the An-32 and started ascending so the aircraft would not be obstructed by the hills while landing at Leh.

Chafekar says Bhatia did not talk during the crisis, but when the aircraft was stabilized, he demanded the aircraft land at Kargil so he could attend the event scheduled there. Chafekar says he refused and landed at Leh using just one engine, flying close to the hills because the aircraft could not generate much power. On landing, the crew saw the right engine had burst and flown off. The missile probably lodged inside the engine because of a system failure. Chafekar claims he was pressured by Bhatia to take the blame for the incident. Bhatia had flown with Chafekar around ten times till the 2002 incident, and Chafekar says Bhatia interfered with the set flying procedure many times. In August 2001, during a supplies drop at Daulat Beg Oldi, Chafekar says Bhatia tried to captain the flight and created issues.

== Later life ==
As of 1 August 2001, Bhatia had accumulated more than 4,000 hours of flying on 16 different aircraft platforms. During his career, he accumulated almost 5,000 flying hours, and was one of the most decorated IAF officers. Bhatia held the record for the oldest Indian to have performed a tandem skydive jump. He executed the jump at the age of 56 from an An-32 near Agra Airport. Bhatia executed the jump on 17 September 1999, with the help of parachute instructor Sanjay Thapar. As of 2020, Bhatia was a member of the executive council of the Manohar Parrikar Institute for Defence Studies and Analyses. After the death of Vinod Neb in 2024, Bhatia remains the only living Indian Air Force officer to have received the Vir Chakra Bar.

== Bibliography ==
=== Books ===
- Chafekar, Suryakant Chintaman (2021). Shades Of Blue: Memoir Of A Courageous IAF Pilot (1st ed.). Pune: Rajhans Prakashan. OCLC 1489055083.
- Jesuadian, Henry (22 December 2017). Himalayan Eagles: The Story of the Indian Air Force. New Delhi and Atlanta: Lancer Publishers. ISBN 9781940988351.
- Singh, Ranbir (1 January 2009). Memorable War Stories: A Gripping Collection of Stories from Real-World Wars and Conflicts. New Delhi: Prabhat Prakashan. ISBN 9788188322664.

=== Government documents ===
- "Air Marshal S Krishnaswamy: New Vice Chief of Air Staff". Press Information Bureau. 1 August 2001. Archived from the original on 3 March 2021.
- "Raksha Mantri Shri Rajnath Singh chairs 165th EC meeting of MP-IDSA". Press Information Bureau. 8 May 2020. Archived from the original on 13 January 2026.
- The Gazette of India, February 12, 1966 (PDF). New Delhi: Government of India. 12 February 1966. Archived (PDF) from the original on 30 April 2025.
- The Gazette of India, June 17, 1972 (PDF). New Delhi: Government of India. 17 June 1972. Archived (PDF) from the original on 21 June 2025.
- The Gazette of India, April 11, 1992 (PDF). New Delhi: Government of India. 11 April 1992. Archived (PDF) from the original on 31 December 2025.
- The Gazette of India, March 14, 1998 (PDF). New Delhi: Government of India. 14 March 1998. Archived (PDF) from the original on 31 December 2025.

=== Articles ===
- Bisht Rawat, Rachna (4 December 2021). "1971 India-Pakistan War: 50 Years and Counting, a Woman's Wait for Her Husband & Closure". News18. Archived from the original on 4 December 2021.
- Chhina, Man Aman Singh (29 January 2024). "Military Digest: AN-32 and C-130 in Kargil revive memories of 2002 missile incident". The Indian Express. Archived from the original on 8 April 2025.
- Chhina, Man Aman Singh (5 February 2024). "Military Digest: In memory of Wing Commander VK Neb, war hero of 1965 and 1971 air battles". The Indian Express. Archived from the original on 23 April 2025.
- Dutta, Sujan (24 April 2002). "Air Marshal Shunted Out". The Telegraph. Archived from the original on 12 December 2025.
- "India on a high". Flight Global. 27 November 2001. Archived from the original on 9 September 2024.
- Gupta, Shekhar (15 December 2017). "Two Indian Air Force prisoners of war on their audacious escape plan from a Rawalpindi jail in 1971". The Print. Archived from the original on 30 October 2024.
- Gupta, Shishir (1 April 2002). "Controversy surrounding air force brass affects India's readiness against Pakistan". India Today. Archived from the original on 23 February 2025.
- Gupta, Anchit (6 July 2022). "India's Top Gun: Air Marshal VK 'Jimmy' Bhatia". IAF History. Archived from the original on 12 December 2025.
- Gupta, Anchit (30 August 2022). "From the IAF vault: Story of the 'Top Guns' from India". Asianet. Archived from the original on 30 August 2022.
- Gupta, Anchit (24 November 2024). "Manget: The Sukhoi That Refused To Be Shot Down". IAF History. Archived from the original on 31 May 2025.
- Gupta, Anchit (17 July 2025). "Runway Nomads: The Story Of The IAF's Mobile Echelons". IAF History. Archived from the original on 11 September 2025.
- Joshi, Sameer (9 September 2019). "1965 Sargodha attack: How IAF hit Pakistan's most protected base & destroyed 10 aircraft". The Print. Archived from the original on 6 February 2025.
- Mann, Simranjit Singh (9 April 2002). "Mailbag | Putting the record in correct perspective". The Tribune India. Archived from the original on 8 December 2025.
- Saini, Sarvesh (9 May 2025). "The Plight of the Missing 54 Defence Personnel of the 1971 Indo-Pak War". Centre for Air Power Studies. Archived from the original on 24 May 2025.
- Singh, Harwant (18 April 2002). "Mailbag | Turmoil". The Tribune India. Archived from the original on 6 December 2024.
- Singh, Onkar (9 September 2002). "The Rediff Interview/M. S. Sekhon". Rediff. Archived from the original on 12 December 2025.
- Swami, Praveen (30 March 2002). "An officer and a politician". Frontline, The Hindu. Archived from the original on 24 September 2023.
- "Untold Story Of A Pak Stinger Missile Strike". The Telegraph India. 4 March 2002. Archived from the original on 6 June 2023.
- "People / Manjit Singh Sekhon". The Telegraph India. 23 March 2002. Archived from the original on 15 November 2020.
- "IAF cites personal reasons". The Tribune India. 3 September 1999. Archived from the original on 19 July 2008.
- "Daring feat by parachutists". The Tribune India. Press Trust of India. 18 September 1999. Archived from the original on 9 May 2005.
- "Krishnaswamy Vice-Chief of Air Staff". The Tribune India. 1 June 2001. Archived from the original on 20 April 2025.
- "Pak says it fired at Indian plane". The Tribune India. Reuters. 12 March 2002. Archived from the original on 12 October 2013.
- "Air Marshal Sekhon told to quit". The Tribune India. 18 March 2002. Archived from the original on 21 October 2013.
- "Ghandhi Western Air Command AOC-in-C". The Tribune India. 20 May 2002. Archived from the original on 29 September 2022.
- "Goel appointed IG, Flight Safety". The Tribune India. 10 November 2002. Archived from the original on 2 December 2024.
- Tipnis, Anil Yashwant (23 July 2024). "25 Years of Kargil: Former Air Force Chief A.Y. Tipnis Recounts 'Operation Safed Sagar'". The Wire. Archived from the original on 12 December 2025.
- "Air force station inaugurated at Phalodi, Jodhpur". Zee News. 1 August 2001. Archived from the original on 20 August 2017.
