= Defence Services Staff College =

Inter-service institution of the Indian Ministry of Defence

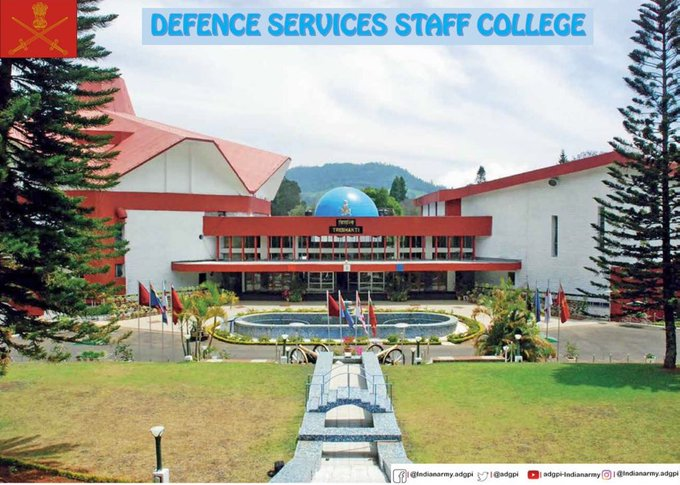
- Motto: Sanskrit: Yuddham Pragya
- Motto in English: To War with Wisdom
- Type: Defence Service Training Institute
- Established: August 1947; 78 years ago
- Commandant: Lt Gen Manish Erry, PVSM UYSM AVSM SM
- Location: Wellington Cantonment, Nilgiris district, Tamil Nadu, India; 11.363529°N 76.7917566°E
- Mascot: The Owl
- Website: DSSC homepage

- Location in Tamil Nadu Defence Services Staff College (India)

The Defence Services Staff College (DSSC) is a premier defence service training institution of the Ministry of Defence, Government of India. It trains officers of all three services of the Indian Armed Forces – (Indian Army, Indian Navy, Indian Air Force), civilian officers and officers from friendly foreign countries for command and staff appointments.

== History ==
The Defence Services Staff College, one of India's oldest military institutions was re-established at Wellington, Coonoor from Quetta in the present day Pakistan following the Partition of British India in August 1947. During the partition, Pakistan inherited the Staff College, Quetta, originally founded in 1905 at Deolali before relocating to Quetta in 1907.

The Indian elements of the Staff College, Quetta led by the senior-most Indian Army instructor Colonel S. D. Verma moved to India. Verma was promoted brigadier and appointed as the first commandant and chose Wellington Cantonment in The Nilgiris District of Tamil Nadu as the location of the Staff College in India.

The first staff course started in April 1948, months after the move. The first course had 46 officers from the Indian Army and 2 each from the Indian Navy and Indian Air Force. Two officers from this course – Major Tapishwar Narain Raina and Squadron Leader Hrushikesh Moolgavkar went on to head their services as the Chiefs. The air wing was established in 1949 and the Naval Wing in 1950 and the college was rechristened Defence Services Staff College. The college threw open its gates to officers from friendly foreign countries from the fifth course and to civil servants from the sixth course.

DSSC has been affiliated to Madras University for the award of M.Sc. degree in 'Defence and Strategic Studies' and recognized as a research centre for MPhil and PhD degrees since 1990.

== Crest and motto ==
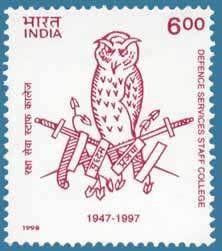
1998 postage stamp on the occasion of the golden jubilee of the college

The Staff College when at Quetta adopted the crest of Staff College, Camberley, which was the 'Wise Owl' with the Latin motto Tam Marte Quam Minerva. In 1964, Owl perched on crossed swords and the motto in Sanskrit Yuddham Pragya was adopted.

== Commandant ==
The commandant of the Defence Services Staff College is the head of the institution. The commandant is an army officer of the rank of lieutenant general.

== Organisation ==
The commandant of the college is assisted by the chief instructors (CI) of the army, naval and air wings, all two-star appointments. The CIs are drawn from the respective services. The Incharge of the administrative wing (also a two-star appointment), and the brigadier general staff (BGS) also report into the commandant.

== Notable alumni ==
=== Chiefs of Army Staff ===
- Field Marshal Sam Manekshaw
- General P. P. Kumaramangalam
- General Tapishwar Narain Raina
- General Om Prakash Malhotra
- General Arun Shridhar Vaidya
- General K. V. Krishna Rao
- General Krishnaswamy Sundarji
- General Vishwa Nath Sharma
- General Sunith Francis Rodrigues
- General Bipin Chandra Joshi
- General Shankar Roychowdhury
- General Ved Prakash Malik
- General Sundararajan Padmanabhan
- General Nirmal Chander Vij
- General J. J. Singh
- General Deepak Kapoor
- General V. K. Singh
- General Bikram Singh
- General Bipin Rawat
- General Manoj Mukund Naravane
- General Manoj Pande

=== Chiefs of Naval Staff ===
- Admiral Ronald Lynsdale Pereira
- Admiral Oscar Stanley Dawson
- Admiral Jayant Ganpat Nadkarni
- Admiral Vishnu Bhagwat
- Admiral Sushil Kumar
- Admiral Madhvendra Singh
- Admiral Arun Prakash
- Admiral Sureesh Mehta
- Admiral Robin K. Dhowan
- Admiral Sunil Lanba
- Admiral Karambir Singh

=== Chiefs of Air Staff ===
- Air Chief Marshal Hrushikesh Moolgavkar
- Air Chief Marshal Idris Hasan Latif
- Air Chief Marshal Lakshman Madhav Katre
- Air Chief Marshal Surinder Mehra
- Air Chief Marshal S. K. Kaul
- Air Chief Marshal Satish Sareen
- Air Chief Marshal Anil Yashwant Tipnis
- Air Chief Marshal Srinivasapuram Krishnaswamy
- Air Chief Marshal Shashindra Pal Tyagi
- Air Chief Marshal Pradeep Vasant Naik
- Air Chief Marshal Arup Raha
- Air Chief Marshal Birender Singh Dhanoa

=== Foreign alumni ===
- Hans-Christoph Ammon, Head of German special forces
- Muhammadu Buhari, President and former military Head of State, Nigeria
- Olusegun Obasanjo, former Nigerian President
- Sitiveni Rabuka OBE, MSD, OStJ, 3rd Prime Minister of Fiji
- Lieutenant Colonel Gotabhaya Rajapaksa, RWP, RSP, GR – former President of Sri Lanka
- Major General Matheus Alueendo 7th Commander of the Namibian Army
- Admiral Basil Gunasekara, former commander of the Sri Lanka Navy

== See also ==
- Pakistan Command and Staff College
- Indian National Defence University
- Military Academies in India
- Sainik school
