= Suryakant Chintaman Chafekar =

Indian Air Force officer retired 2017

Air Vice Marshal Suryakant Chintaman Chafekar AVSM, SC
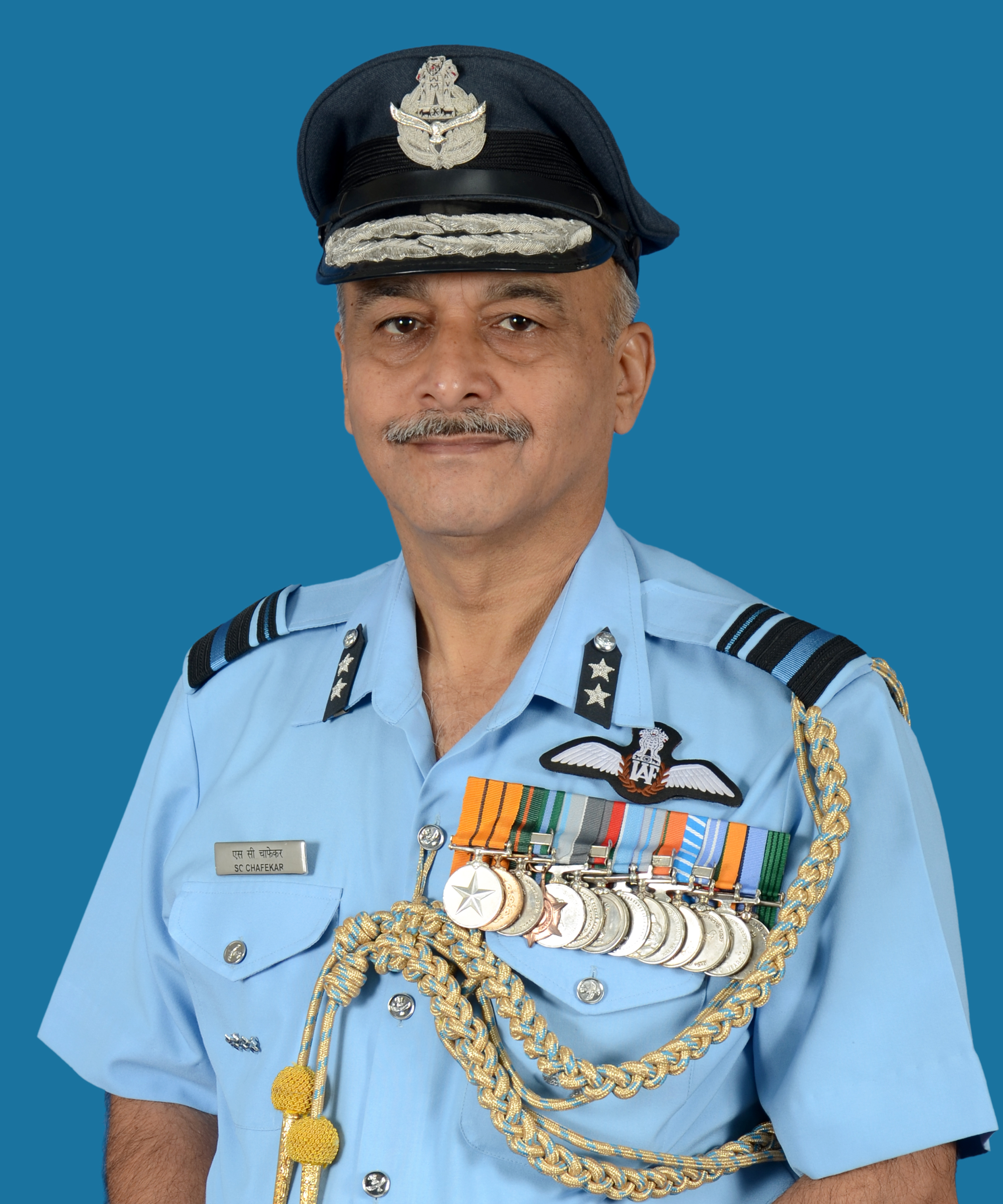
- Born: 27 September 1959 (age 67); Nagpur, Maharashtra, India
- Spouse: Abhilasha Suryakant Chafekar
- Military career
- Allegiance: India
- Service: Indian Air Force
- Service years: 1982–2017
- Rank: Air Vice Marshal
- Service number: 17013-L
- Conflicts: Operation Pawan; Operation Cactus
- Awards: Ati Vishisht Seva Medal; Shaurya Chakra
- Other work: Author, Defence Analyst

Air Vice Marshal Suryakant Chintaman Chafekar AVSM, SC is a retired Indian Air Force (IAF) officer who served as the Senior Air and Administration Staff Officer, Maintenance Command, IAF, from 1 July 2016 until he retired on 30 September 2017. He was the commanding officer of No. 48 Squadron IAF. During his career he landed Antonov An-32 aircraft on High Altitude Advanced Landing Grounds (HAALG)s in Daulat Beg Oldi, Fukche and Nyoma.

== Early life and education ==
Suryakant Chintaman Chafekar was born on 27 September 1959 at Nagpur, Maharashtra, to Captain Chintaman Vishnu Chafekar and Vijaya Chintaman Chafekar. Captain Chintaman Vishnu Chafekar was an officer in the Indian Territorial Army and a social activist. Vijaya Chintaman Chafekar was a school principal from Nagpur.

Suryakant Chintaman Chafekar is an alumnus of Dharampeth Science College, Nagpur; Air Force Academy, Dundigal; Flying Instructors School; Defence Services Staff College, Wellington, Tamil Nadu; and College of Air Warfare, Secunderabad.

== Military career ==
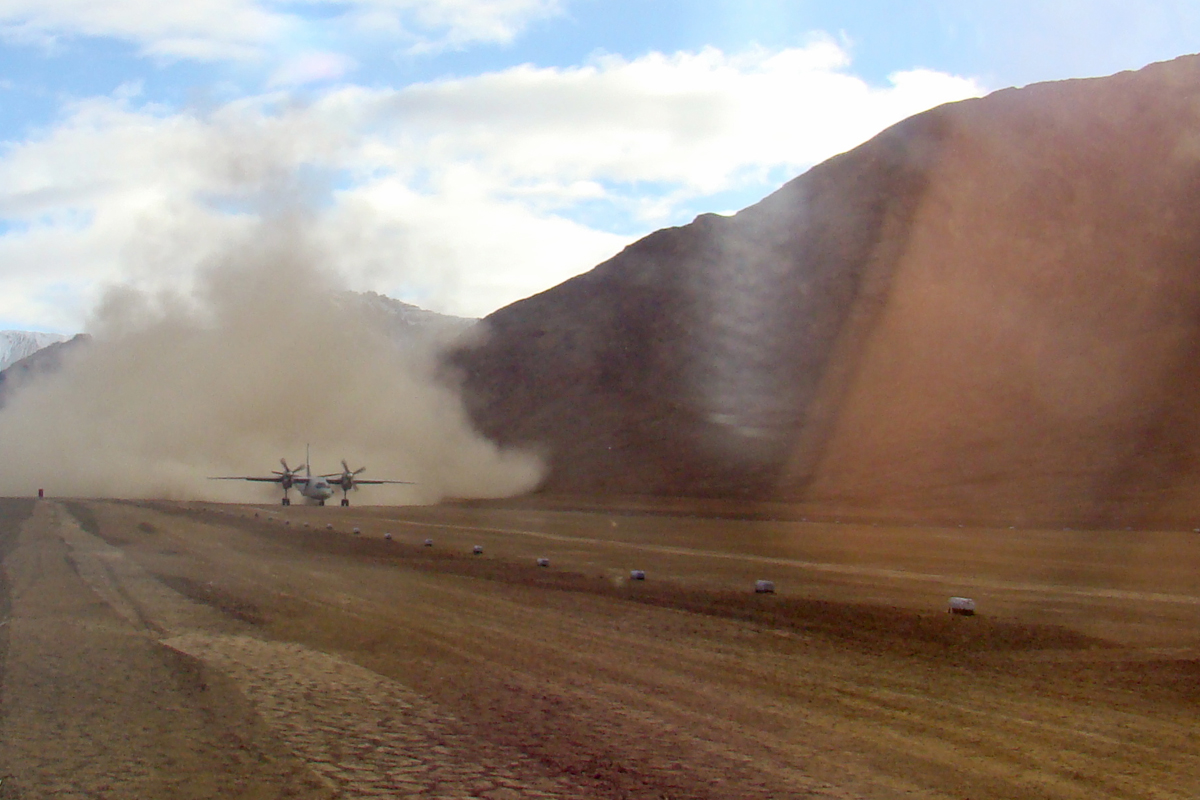
An Indian Air Force Antonov An-32 taking off from the Daulat Beg Oldi ALG

Chafekar was commissioned as a pilot officer in the transport stream of the IAF on 29 December 1982. He has held several important command, staff and instructor appointments during his career. He was considered to be an expert in flying fixed wing aircraft in the Himalayan Region, and supervised humanitarian assistance and disaster relief tasks such as flood and earthquake relief operations.

On 19 February 2002, during a trial landing at Kargil airfield near the Pakistan border his aircraft was fired upon by a Pakistani missile that hit one of the engines, setting the aircraft on fire. He continued to fly the aircraft with only one operational engine, and landed it at IAF airfield at Leh.

During his tenure as the commanding officer of No. 48 Squadron IAF, on 31 May 2008, Chafekar landed an Antonov An-32 aircraft at a HAALG at Daulat Beg Oldi (DBO) (16,700 feet (5,100 m)) about 9 km (5.6 miles) from the Line of Actual Control with China. He was awarded the Shaurya Chakra by the President of India for this mission.

On 4 November 2008, while Chafekar was still serving with No. 48 Squadron, he landed an Antonov An-32 at the Fukche HAALG approximately 3 km (1.9 miles) from the Line of Actual Control with China. This airstrip sat at a height of 13,700 ft (4.2 km) and was last used during the 1962 Sino-Indian War.

Around 15 months after the trial landings at DBO and Fukche, on 18 September 2009, Chafekar landed an Antonov An-32 at the Nyoma ALG, about 23 km (14 miles) from the Line of Actual Control with China.

During his career Chafekar was also awarded the Ati Vishisht Seva Medal by the President of India for his service to the Indian Air Force, from which he retired on 30 September 2017.

== Notable appointments ==
| Name of Appointment | Rank | Insignia | Period |
|---|---|---|---|
| Senior Air and Administration Staff Officer, Maintenance Command, IAF | Air Vice Marshal | | 1 July 2016 to 30 September 2017 |
| Assistant Chief of Integrated Defense Staff (Financial Planning), Integrated Defence Staff | Air Vice Marshal | | 5 June 2015 to 30 June 2016 |
| Principle Director Operations (Transports), Air Headquarters, IAF | Air Commodore | | 2 December 2013 to 31 May 2015 |
| Principle Director Operations (Space), Air Headquarters, IAF | Air Commodore | | 1 May 2013 to 1 December 2013 |
| Air Officer Commanding, Air Force Station Chandigarh, IAF | Air Commodore | | 2 May 2011 to 30 April 2013 |
| Principle Director Operations (Transports & Helicopters), Air Headquarters, IAF | Air Commodore | | 26 April 2010 to 1 May 2011 |
| Director Operations (Transports), Air Headquarters, IAF | Group Captain | | 18 November 2009 to 25 April 2010 |
| Commanding Officer, No. 48 Squadron IAF | Group Captain | | 1 January 2008 to 17 November 2009 |
| Chief Operating Officer, Air Force Station Agra, IAF | Group Captain | | 1 July 2005 to 31 December 2007 |
| Commanding Officer, 2 Maharashtra Air Sqn NCC Nagpur, IAF | Wing Commander | | 12 September 2002 to 30 June 2005 |

== Honours and awards ==
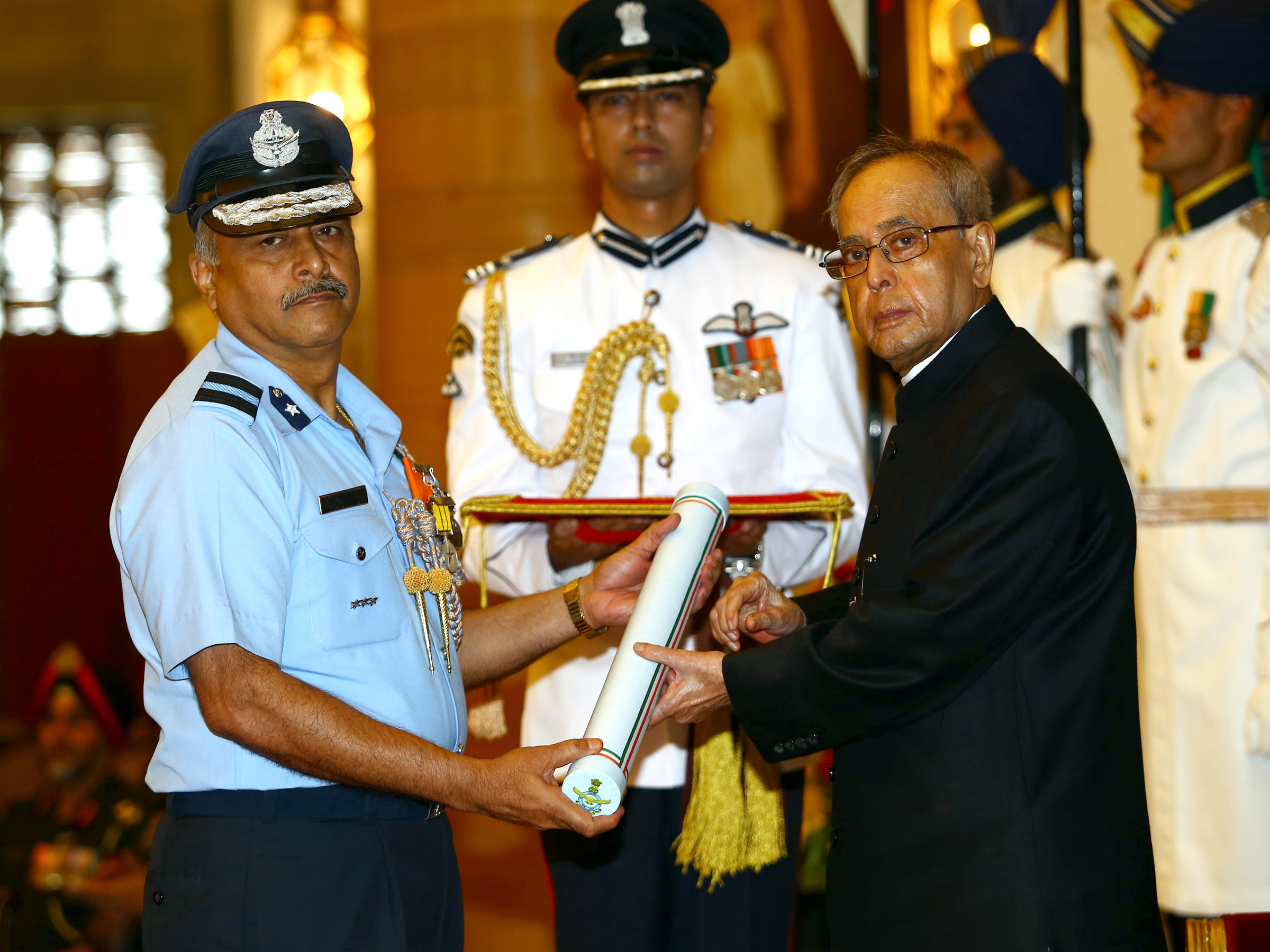
AVM SC Chafekar presented with Ati Vishisht Seva Medal at Rashtrapati Bhavan in 2015

- Ati Vishisht Seva Medal – Citation: "Distinguished service of an exceptional order in the Indian Air Force", 2015
- Shaurya Chakra – Citation: "Planned and executed the Antonov An-32 landing at Daulat Beg Oldi during tenure of Commanding Officer of No. 48 Squadron IAF", 2009
- Lakshmi Bai Tilak Award for Best Autobiography– Citation: Air Vice Marshal Suryakant Chintaman Chafekar AVSM, SC is being awarded Best Autobiography Literature Award 2021 for his book Nilaeechya Chatta by Maharashtra Sahitya Parishad, Pune, India
- Rashtriya Sant Tukdoji Maharaj Smruti Puraskar – Citation: Air Vice Marshal Suryakant Chintaman Chafekar AVSM, SC is being awarded Best Autobiography Literature Award 2021-22 for his book Nilaeechya Chatta by Vidarbha Sahitya Sangha, Nagpur, India

== Dates of rank ==
| Insignia | Rank | Component | Date of rank |
|---|---|---|---|
| | Pilot Officer | Indian Air Force | 29 December 1982 |
| | Flying Officer | Indian Air Force | 29 December 1984 |
| | Flight Lieutenant | Indian Air Force | 29 December 1986 |
| | Squadron Leader | Indian Air Force | 29 December 1993 |
| | Wing Commander | Indian Air Force | 17 May 1999 |
| | Group Captain | Indian Air Force | 20 November 2006 |
| | Air Commodore | Indian Air Force | 10 May 2010 |
| | Air Vice-Marshal | Indian Air Force | 1 September 2015 |

== Post-retirement ==
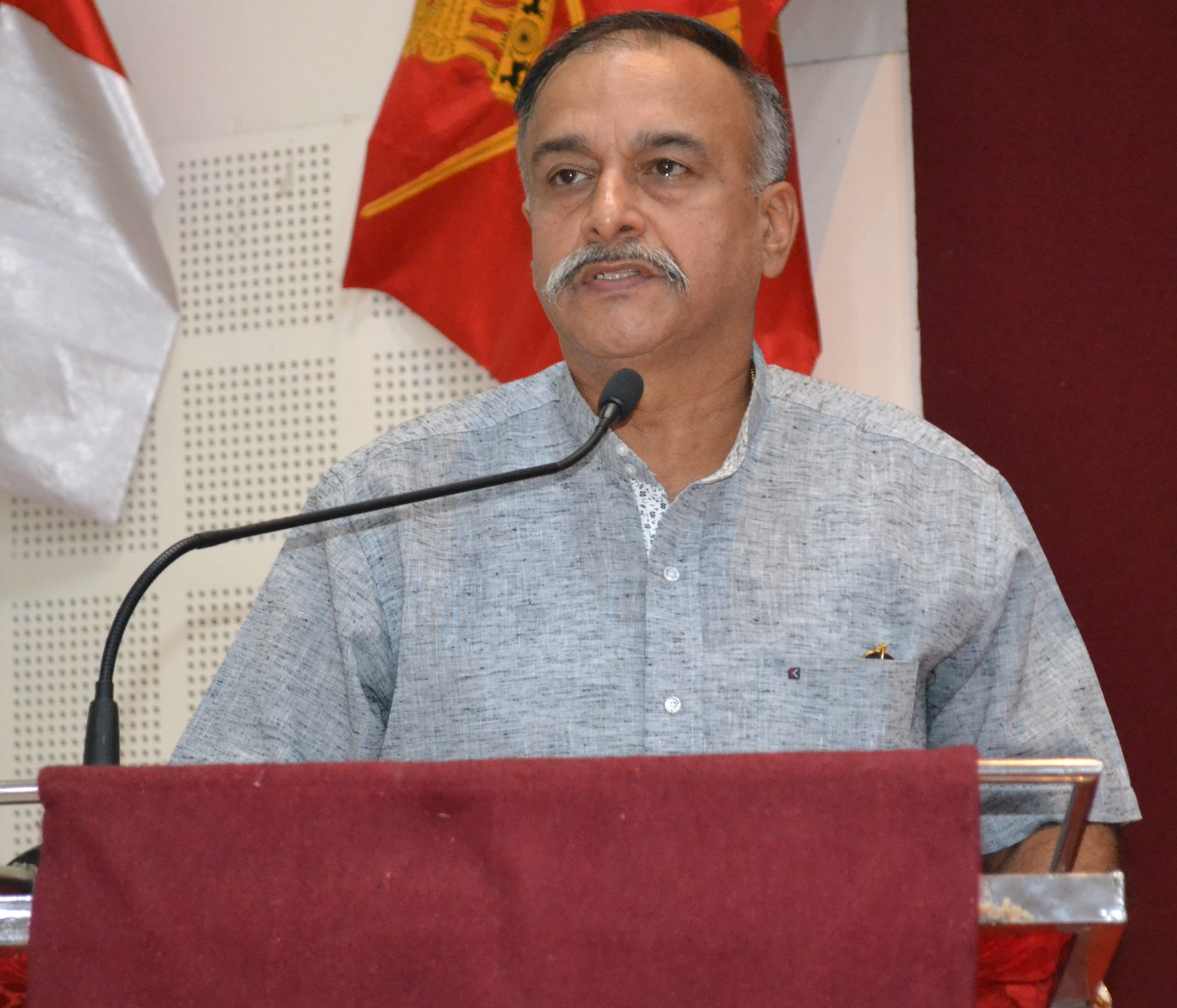
AVM SC Chafekar (retd.) delivering a speech at a Prahar military school seminar

He has published his autobiography in 2 languages- Nilaeechya Chatta (Marathi, published September 2021), Shades of Blue (English, published November 2021). These books have been published by Rajhans Prakashan, Pune, India. He has been awarded Lakshmi Bai Tilak Award for Best Autobiography (Marathi) for year 2021 by Maharashtra Sahitya Parishad, Pune, India. He has also been awarded Rashtriya Sant Tukdoji Maharaj Smruti Puraskar for Best Autobiography (Marathi) for year 2021-22 by Vidarbha Sahitya Sangha, Nagpur, India.

He also works as a defence analyst and publishes articles in many Indian newspapers including The Hitavada, The Times of India, and Loksatta.

== Military awards and decorations ==

| Ati Vishisht Seva Medal | | Shaurya Chakra | |
| Samanya Seva Medal | Siachen Glacier Medal | Special Service Medal | Operation Parakram Medal |
| Operation Vijay Medal | Sainya Seva Medal | High Altitude Service Medal | Videsh Seva Medal |
| 50th Anniversary of Independence Medal | 30 Years Long Service Medal | 20 Years Long Service Medal | 9 Years Long Service Medal |
