= Vinod Patney =

Indian Air Force officer, Vir Chakra recipient

Air Marshal Vinod Patney SYSM, PVSM, AVSM, VrC
- Military career
- Allegiance: India
- Branch: Indian Air Force
- Service years: 31 May 1961 – 31 July 2001
- Rank: Air Marshal
- Service number: 6125
- Commands: Western Air Command; Central Air Command
- Awards: Sarvottam Yudh Seva Medal; Param Vishisht Seva Medal; Ati Vishisht Seva Medal; Vir Chakra

Air Marshal Vinod Patney, SYSM, PVSM, AVSM, VrC is a retired Indian Air Force officer. He is currently Director General Centre for Air Power Studies.

== Career ==
Patney was commissioned in Indian Air Force in 1961. He has participated in conflict of 1965 for which he was awarded a Vir Chakra. He also participated in the 1971 India-Pakistan war.

He is former Director General of HelpAge India.

=== Vir Chakra citation ===
Air Marshal Patney was awarded the Vir Chakra for operations during the 1965 India Pakistan War. His Vir Chakra Citation reads as follows:

CITATION
FLIGHT LIEUTENANT VINOD PATNEY

During the operations against Pakistan, Flight Lieutenant Vinod Patney was serving in an Operational Squadron in a forward area. He flew 16 operational sorties within the short period.

On 13th September 1965, he took part in a ground attack mission in the Kasur Khem Karan Sector and flew as No.3 in a four aircraft formation. During the attack, the formation met with heavy and determined ground fire from the enemy guns. One of our aircraft was shot down. Undeterred and undaunted by this, Flight Lieutenant Patney pressed home five effective attacks on different enemy targets and destroying 3 Patton tanks. The courage and initiative displayed by Flight Lieutenant Vinod Patney were in the best traditions of the Indian Air Force.

== Awards and decorations ==
Patney was awarded the SYSM, PVSM, AVSM and VrC in his career with the Indian Air Force that lasted more than four decades.

Sarvottam Yudh Seva Medal		Param Vishisht Seva Medal	
Ati Vishisht Seva Medal	Vir Chakra		Samar Seva Medal
Paschimi Star	Siachen Glacier Medal	Raksha Medal	Sangram Medal
Sainya Seva Medal	High Altitude Service Medal	Videsh Seva Medal	50th Anniversary of Independence Medal
25th Anniversary of Independence Medal	30 Years Long Service Medal	20 Years Long Service Medal	9 Years Long Service Medal

Military offices
Preceded by Prithvi Singh Brar	Vice Chief of Air Staff; 1 August 2000 – 31 July 2001	Succeeded by Srinivasapuram Krishnaswamy
Preceded by Vinod Kumar Bhatia	Air Officer Commanding-in-Chief, Central Air Command; 1 November 1999 – 31 July 2000	Succeeded by Vinod Kumar Verma
Preceded by Anil Yashwant Tipnis	Air Officer Commanding-in-Chief, Western Air Command; 1 April 1997 – 31 October 1999	Succeeded by Srinivasapuram Krishnaswamy
Preceded by Dev Nath Rathore	Air Officer Commanding-in-Chief, Central Air Command; 1 July 1996 – 31 March 1997	Succeeded by Srinivasapuram Krishnaswamy
