= Maurice Barker =

Indian Air Force officer

Air Marshal Maurice Barker PVSM
- Born: 29 November 1920
- Died: 31 December 1989 (aged 69)
- Education: Bombay Flying Club
- Military career
- Allegiance: India
- Branch: Indian Air Force
- Service years: 1941–1976
- Rank: Air Marshal
- Service number: 1691
- Commands: Central Air Command, Eastern Air Command, Training Command, Maintenance Command
- Conflicts: Indo-Pakistani war of 1971
- Awards: Param Vishisht Seva Medal (PVSM)

Air Marshal Maurice Barker, PVSM (29 September 1920 – 31 December 1989), was a senior officer in the Indian Air Force (IAF) and the first Anglo-Indian to reach the rank of Air Marshal. Commissioned in 1941, he served with distinction during the 1971 Indo-Pakistan War. He was awarded the Param Vishisht Seva Medal (PVSM) for his leadership as Air Officer Commanding-in-Chief (AOC-in-C) of Central Air Command.

== Early life and education ==
Maurice Barker was born on 29 September 1920 in British India. As an Anglo-Indian, he was among the first from his community to join the IAF. Barker trained as a pilot at the Bombay Flying Club before his commissioning.

== Military career ==
Barker was commissioned as a Pilot Officer in the General Duties (Pilot) branch of the IAF on 11 March 1941 (Service No. 1691). He progressed through the ranks, serving in various operational and command roles.

Early career

Barker commanded No. 4 Squadron and served as station commander at Palam and Kalaikunda air bases. He later held the position of president of the IAF Selection Board in Dehradun.

Senior appointments

Senior Air Staff Officer, Western Air Command (1968–1971): Oversaw operational planning in Delhi.

Air Officer-in-Charge Maintenance, Air HQ (June 1972 – March 1973): Managed IAF maintenance operations.

AOC-in-C, Central Air Command, Allahabad (April 1971 – June 1972): Led bomber, transport, and maritime operations during the 1971 Indo-Pakistan War, earning the PVSM.

AOC-in-C, Eastern Air Command, Shillong (April 1973 – April 1976): Promoted to Air Marshal in 1973, he oversaw operations in eastern India.

AOC-in-C, Training Command, Bangalore (April 1976 – September 1976): Served until his retirement.

1971 Indo-Pakistan War

During the 1971 Indo-Pakistan War, which led to the creation of Bangladesh, Barker served as AOC-in-C of Central Air Command. He organised and led night bombing missions on strategic targets in East and West Pakistan, supported daytime Army operations in East Pakistan after neutralising the Pakistan Air Force, and collaborated with Eastern Air Command for a successful airborne operation.

Anglo-Indian significance

As the first Anglo-Indian to join the IAF in 1941 and reach the rank of Air Marshal, Barker broke significant barriers for his community, which faced exclusion from the IAF under British policies until the 1930s. His success inspired other Anglo-Indian officers, with at least seven others achieving the rank of Air Marshal, a notable achievement for a community of 125,000–400,000 in modern India. Barker’s legacy is celebrated in Anglo-Indian histories for advancing representation in the IAF.

== Awards and recognition ==
Param Vishisht Seva Medal (PVSM) (26 January 1972): Awarded for service during the 1971 Indo-Pakistan War, recognising his leadership in Central Air Command.

== Later life and death ==
Barker retired from the IAF on 22 September 1976. He died on 31 December 1989 at the age of 69.

== Legacy ==
Barker is remembered as a trailblazer for the Anglo-Indian community and a key figure in the IAF’s success during the 1971 war. His leadership in high-ranking commands and his PVSM underscore his contributions to Indian military aviation. Barker’s career continues to inspire Anglo-Indian representation in the armed forces.
