= 64th Cavalry (India) =

Indian Army regiment

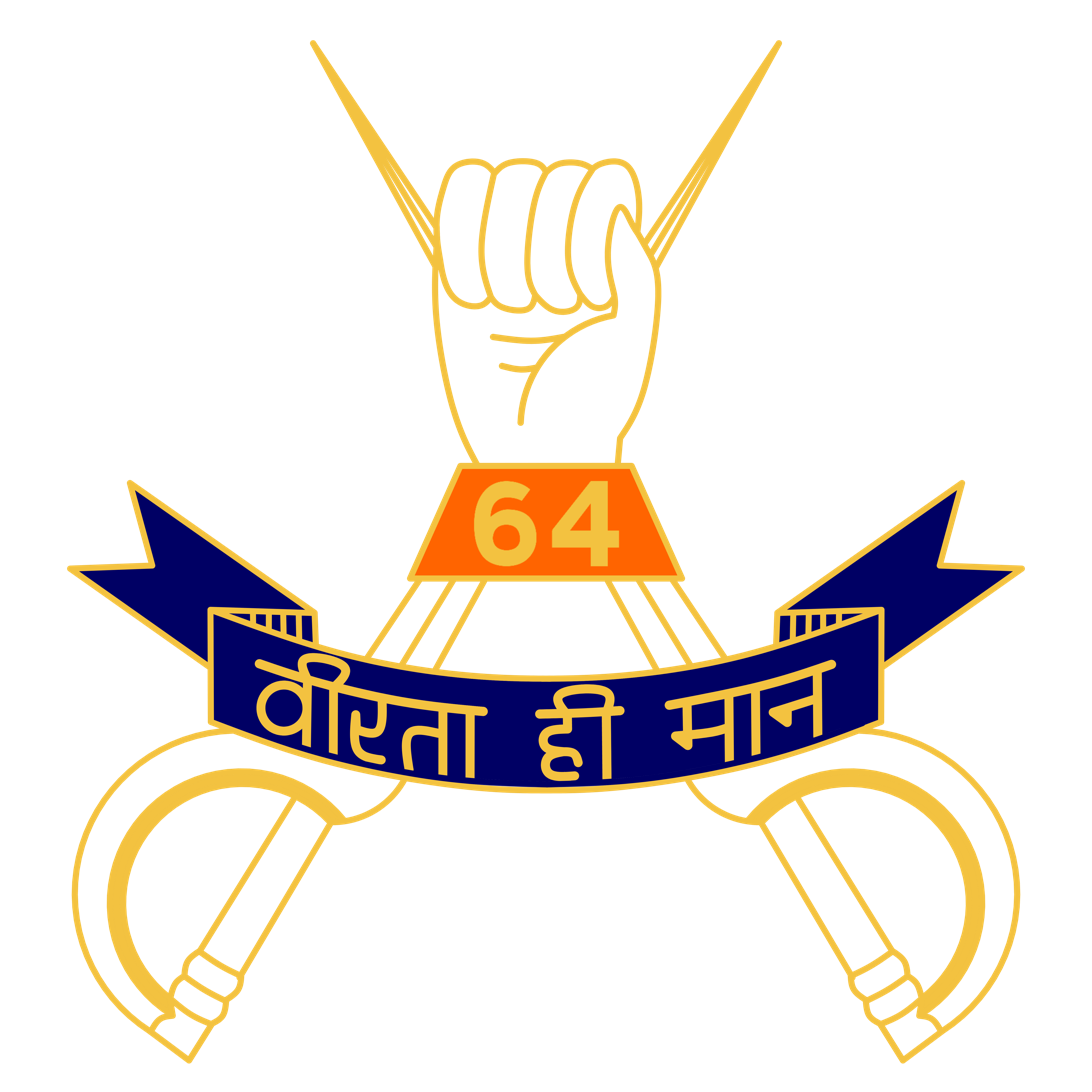
- Insignia of the 64th Cavalry
- Active: 1966 – present
- Country: India
- Allegiance: India
- Branch: Indian Army
- Type: Armour
- Size: Regiment
- Nickname: ‘Flashing Sabres’
- Mottos: वीरता ही मान; Veerta hi Maan (By Courage and Honour)
- Colors: Cordite Blue, Ochre and Gold

Commanders
- Colonel of the Regiment: Lieutenant General Vipul Singhal
- Notable commanders: Gen Bipin Chandra Joshi, PVSM, AVSM, ADC; Maj Gen AK Singh, Maj Gen Sanjeev Shukla; Maj Gen A Krishnan

Insignia
- Abbreviation: 64 Cav

The 64th Cavalry is an armoured regiment of the Armoured Corps of the Indian Army.

== Formation ==
After the 1965 Indo-Pakistan War, a number of armoured regiments were raised for the Indian Army, of which 64 Cavalry was the first. However, it was the last to use the epithet of cavalry, all subsequent regiments were named armoured regiments instead. It was raised in Babina on 31 March 1966 by Lieutenant Colonel Trevor Lancelot Perry, a former Indian Air Force pilot, with a class composition of Sikhs, Jats and Rajputs.

== Equipment ==
The Regiment was initial equipped with T-54 tanks, which were replaced by the Vijayanta tanks in 1981. In 1991, the regiment was upgraded to the T-72 tanks.

== History ==
During the Indo-Pakistani War of 1971, the regiment, then under Lt Col Bipin Chandra Joshi and equipped with T-54 tanks, was part of 14 Independent Armoured Brigade supporting XI Corps in the Western theatre, but did not see any action.

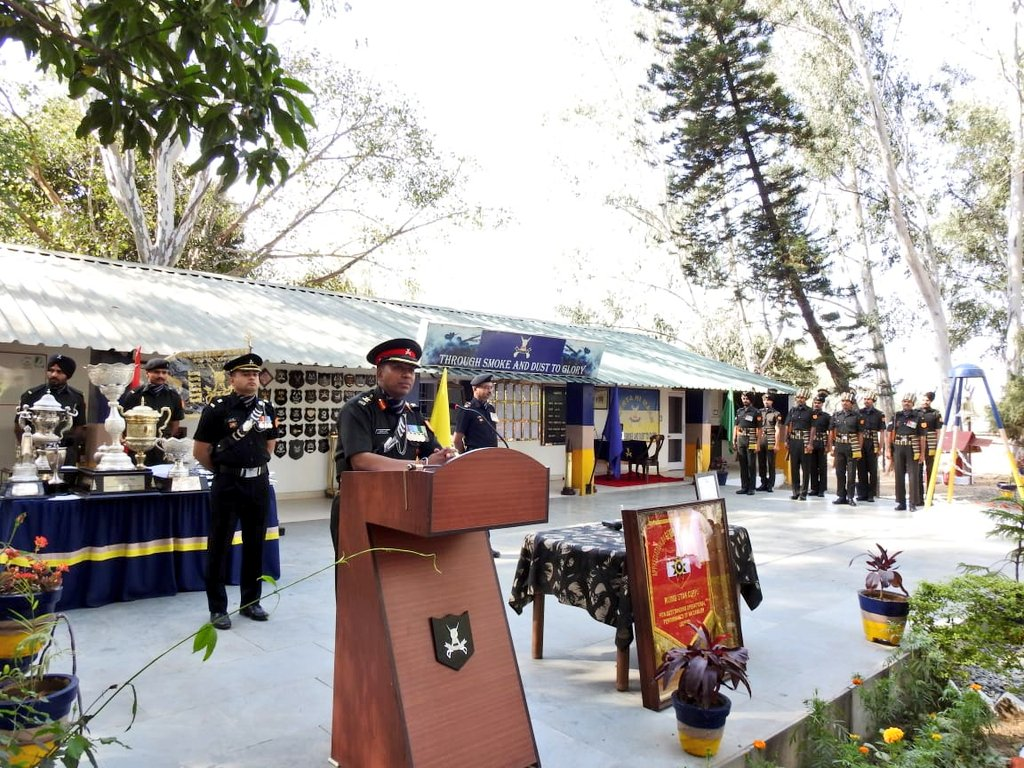
64th Cavalry - 'The Flashing Sabres' celebrating their 55th Raising Day, 31 March 2021

It was located in the Chhamb corridor during Operation Trident and also participated in Operation Rakshak, where the regiment was in a peace-keeping role. Lately, the regiment took part in Operation Vijay and in Operation Parakram.

The President of India R Venkataraman presented a guidon to the regiment in Jammu on 7 April 1991.

The Jammu and Kashmir Rifles and the naval ship INS Vibhuti are affiliated to the regiment.

The regiment has also produced a Chief of the Army Staff, Gen Bipin Chandra Joshi, PVSM, AVSM, ADC.

== Regimental Insignia ==
- The regimental cap badge consists of a mailed right-handed fist, placed on the crossing of a pair of sabres, with a scroll along the bottom which has the regimental motto in Devanagari script.
- The shoulder title consists of "64C" in brass.
- The regimental motto is वीरता ही मान (Veerta hi Maan), which translates to ‘By Courage and Honour’.
- The regimental colours are Cordite Blue (signifying the colour of smoke emanating from the gun barrel), Ochre (signifying the dust kicked up by the tank) and Gold (signifying the quest for glory). The colours put together signify ‘Through smoke and dust to glory’
