= Nirmal Chandra Suri =

Indian air force air Marshal (born 1933)

Air Chief Marshal Nirmal Chandra Suri PVSM, AVSM, VM, ADC

15th Chief of Air Staff
- In office 31 July 1991 – 31 July 1993
- President: Ramaswamy Venkataraman
- Prime Minister: P. V. Narasimha Rao
- Preceded by: Surinder Mehra
- Succeeded by: S.K.Kaul

Personal details
- Born: 26 July 1933 (age 93)
- Education: St Xavier's School, Calcutta; Prince of Wales Royal Indian Military College, Dehradun; Allahabad University; Intercultural University Netherlands
- Awards: Ati Vishist Seva Medal (AVSM); Param Vishist Seva Medal (PVSM); Vayu Sena Medal (VM)

Military service
- Allegiance: India
- Branch/service: Indian Air Force
- Years of service: 1952-1993
- Rank: Air Chief Marshal
- Commands: Central Air Command; No.20 Squadron; No.7 Squadron
- Battles/wars: Indo-Pakistani War of 1965; Indo-Pakistani War of 1971

Air Chief Marshal Nirmal Chandra Suri, PVSM, AVSM, VM, ADC (born 26 July 1933) was the 15th Chief of Air Staff of the Indian Air Force, from 31 July 1991 to 31 July 1993. He is an alumnus of the famous Royal Indian Military College, Dehradun. He was a part of the First course of the Joint Services Wing, the present-day National Defence Academy, Pune. He was commissioned in the Indian Air Force as a fighter pilot on15 March 1952.
During the Indo-Pakistani War of 1965, Suri was selected to lead the detachment from No.20 Hawker Hunter Squadron and he flew several sorties during the war. In 1969, he was awarded the Vayu Sena Medal for his contributions and devotion to service.

During the 1971 War, Suri took over the Number 7 Hunter Squadron and he flew several sorties during this war as well. He was awarded the Ati Vishisht Seva Medal or AVSM in 1982.

He became the Chief of Air Staff on 1 August 1991 and was instrumental in various initiatives – including the induction of women officers in the IAF first as ground duty officers and later as pilots. He has always been a passionate flyer and he is not known to have passed on any opportunity to fly. Air Chief Marshal N. C. Suri retired from service on 31 July 1993 and was succeeded by S. K. Kaul.

Military offices
Preceded by Surinder Kumar Mehra	Chief of the Air Staff (India); 1991–1993	Succeeded by S.K. Kaul
