= Bipin Chandra Joshi =

17th Chief of Army Staff of the Indian Army

General Bipin Chandra Joshi PVSM, AVSM, ADC
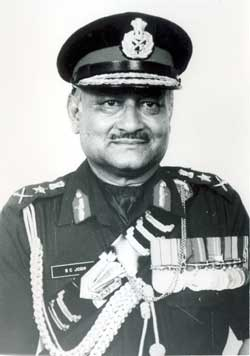

16th Chief of the Army Staff
- In office 1 July 1990 – 19 November 1994
- President: Ramaswamy Venkataraman; Shankar Dayal Sharma
- Prime Minister: V. P. Singh; Chandra Shekhar; P. V. Narasimha Rao
- Preceded by: Sunith Francis Rodrigues
- Succeeded by: Shankar Roy Chowdhary

Personal details
- Born: 5 December 1935 Pithoragarh, United Provinces, British India (now Uttarakhand, India)
- Died: 19 November 1994 (aged 58) New Delhi, India
- Awards: Param Vishisht Seva Medal; Ati Vishisht Seva Medal

Military service
- Allegiance: India
- Branch/service: Indian Army
- Years of service: 1954–1994
- Rank: General
- Commands: Western Army; Southern Army

General Bipin Chandra Joshi, PVSM, AVSM, ADC (5 December 1935 – 19 November 1994) was the 16th Chief of Army Staff (COAS) of the Indian Army. He is the only Chief of the Indian Army to die in office, and until the 2021 death of General Bipin Rawat in a helicopter crash, the only full general and serving Chairman of the Chiefs of Staff Committee to have died in office.

== Early life ==
Joshi was born in a Hindu Kumaoni Brahmin family. He was the first Army Chief from Uttar Pradesh (Pithoragarh, Uttarakhand was a part of erstwhile Uttar Pradesh).

== Career ==
- Commissioned 4 December 1954 into 2nd Lancers (Gardner's Horse), Indian Army Armoured Corps.
- Commanded an armoured regiment the 64th Cavalry in the Western Sector during the 1971 Indo-Pak operations. He also commanded an Independent Armoured Brigade and an Infantry Division.
- Military Advisor in Australia from May 1973 to October 1976
- Staff officer in the UN Force in Gaza
- Brigadier General Staff in a Corps Headquarters
- Commanded a Corps in the Eastern Sector
- General Officer Commanding-in-Chief, Southern Command.
- Additional Director General of Perspective Planning (ADG PP) & Director General Military Operations (DGMO) at the Army Headquarters
- Three tenures as an instructor in the Armoured Corps Centre and School, Ahmednagar
- Directed Staff in the College of Combat, Mhow
- Established the Army Institute of Technology in Pune (Engineering College), Maharashtra in August 1994 for the wards of defence personnel, either in service or retired.

Joshi also became Colonel of the regiment of the 64 Cavalry and 44 Armd Regt.

== Medals ==
Joshi has been a recipient of the Param Vishisht Seva Medal, Ati Vishisht Seva Medal for distinguished service of the most exceptional order.

== Death ==
Joshi died of a cardiac arrest in New Delhi Military Hospital on 18 November 1994. He was due to retire in 1995. He was the first Chief of Indian Army who died in harness. General Bipin Rawat, former Chief and the serving Chief of Defence Staff, also died in a tragic helicopter crash in December 2021 whilst landing at the Defence Services Staff College in Wellington. General Joshi’s untimely death changed the entire line of succession for the post of Chief of Army Staff, which is typically decided on the basis of seniority. As a result, Lt. Gen. Shankar Roy Chowdhary was promoted to full general and appointed the 17th Chief of Army Staff.

== Legacy ==
The Gen. B. C. Joshi Army Public School was established in 1993 in Pithoragarh, Uttarakhand in his honour.

== Honours and decorations ==

Param Vishisht Seva Medal
Ati Vishisht Seva Medal	Samanya Seva Medal	Paschimi Star	Special Service Medal
Raksha Medal	Sangram Medal	Sainya Seva Medal	Videsh Seva Medal
25th Anniversary of Independence Medal	30 Years Long Service Medal	20 Years Long Service Medal	9 Years Long Service Medal

== Dates of rank ==
Insignia	Rank	Component	Date of rank
	Second Lieutenant	Indian Army	4 December 1954
	Lieutenant	Indian Army	4 December 1956
	Captain	Indian Army	4 December 1960
	Major	Indian Army	4 December 1967
	Lieutenant Colonel	Indian Army	1 April 1974
	Colonel	Indian Army	19 October 1979
	Brigadier	Indian Army	1 April 1980
	Major General	Indian Army	1 October 1984
	Lieutenant General	Indian Army	2 June 1987 (seniority from 1 April)
	General (COAS)	Indian Army	1 July 1993

Military offices
Preceded by Laxminarayan Ramdas	Chairman of the Chiefs of Staff Committee; 1 October 1993 - 19 November 1994	Succeeded by S. K. Kaul
Preceded by Sunith Francis Rodrigues	Chief of Army Staff; 1993–1994	Succeeded by Shankar Roychowdhury
Preceded by G S Grewal	General Officer Commanding-in-Chief Western Command; 1992 -1993	Succeeded by R K Gulati
Preceded by A K Chatterjee	General Officer Commanding-in-Chief Southern Command; 1990 - 1992	Succeeded by A S Kalkat
