= Satish Sareen =

Indian air marshal and author

Air Chief Marshal Satish Kumar Sareen PVSM, AVSM, VM, ADC

17th Chief of Air Staff
- In office 31 December 1995 – 31 December 1998
- President: Shankar Dayal Sharma
- Prime Minister: P. V. Narasimha Rao
- Preceded by: S. K. Kaul
- Succeeded by: Anil Tipnis

Personal details
- Born: 1 March 1939 (age 87) Rawalpindi, Punjab Province, British India (now in Pakistan)
- Spouse: Aruna Sareen
- Education: Defence Services Staff College
- Awards: Param Vishist Seva Medal (PVSM); Ati Vishist Seva Medal (AVSM); Vayu Sena Medal (VM)

Military service
- Allegiance: India
- Branch/service: Indian Air Force
- Years of service: 1957-1998
- Rank: Air Chief Marshal; Service Number (5370)
- Commands: Chief of the Air Staff (India) (1995–1998); Western Air Command; South Western Air Command
- Battles/wars: Indo-Pakistani War of 1965; Indo-Pakistani War of 1971

Air Chief Marshal Satish Kumar Sareen, PVSM, AVSM, VM, ADC (born 1 March 1939) was the Chief of Air Staff of Indian Air Force from 31 December 1995 till 31 December 1998.

== Early life ==
Satish Kumar Sareen's family originally hailed from Rawalpindi, in present-day Pakistan where he was born on 1 March 1939. His family moved to Delhi during the Partition of India.

== Training ==
Sareen joined the IAF in 1954, where he was part of the Joint Services Wing (JSW) in Dehradun. The JSW was a predecessor of today's National Defence Academy. Sareen graduated from the first batch of the JSW and went onto the AFFC for flying training. He was commissioned on 29 May 1957. Sareen stood first among the fighter stream pilots and was awarded the Himmatsinghji trophy.

== Career ==
In 1957, Sareen was posted to No.20 Squadron flying Vampire Fighters. He moved on to No.4 Squadron flying the Organs. It was with No.4 Squadron that he took part in the Goa Operations in 1961 when he flew several sorties against Portuguese targets. After the operations in Goa, Sareen took up his first non-operational appointment when he attended the Pilot Attack Instructor (PAI) course. He distinguished himself in the course and was retained as an instructor in the PAI Program, where he helped impart training to others following in the same stream.

When the Indo-Pakistani War broke out in 1965, Sareen was with No.29 Scorpios Squadron flying the Ouragans at Gauhati. He undertook some sorties against targets in East Pakistan, but the fighting was minimal in the Eastern Sector. After the war, Sareen moved to No.27 Flaming Arrows Squadron flying the Hawker Hunter. After a brief stint, he was part of a detachment of pilots earmarked for conversion to MiG-21s. Sareen moved back to No.29 Squadron after it converted back to the MiG-21.

In January 1970, Sareen attended the Defence Services Staff College (DSSC) at Wellington. He passed out of DSSC in November 1970. Now a Squadron Leader, Sareen joined Eastern Air Command as the chief operations officer with Agartala AFB in Tripura near the East Pakistan border.

Agartala was base to some Gnat fighters during the 1971 Ind-Pak War. He was responsible for planning and launching extensive fighter, helicopter, transport operations including several successful strikes on the Chittagong City. For his role, Sareen received the Vayu Sena Medal.

After the war, Sareen took over as Ops 1 Officer with Eastern Air Command HQ. In 1973, he was posted to No.1 Squadron flying MiG-21s in Adampur as Senior Flight Commander. After more than two years with the Squadron, Sareen received an opportunity to be posted to the Iraqi Air Force as an instructor. This was part of longstanding bilateral arrangements between the two air forces in the 1970s. Sareen took up the offer and was posted to Al-Kut military airbase in Iraq. During his tenure in Iraq till 1977, Sareen undertook more than a 1000 instructional sorties.

In 1977, Sareen was the chief operations officer of No.15 Wing at Bareilly. He got his first command soon after at the same airbase, No.24 Squadron flying the MiG-21bis. After promotion to Group Captain in 1981, he took over an Air Defence Signals Unit in the Eastern Sector. Numerous Staff Appointments followed, he was Air Defence Commander, WAC, and SWAC. Air Attaché to the High Commission of India in London. In 1989, he returned to India and was commander of Srinagar Air Force Station in the Jammu and Kashmir Valley. He was awarded the Ati Vishisht Seva Medal (AVSM) for distinguished service in 1990. Soon afterwards he took over as ACAS (Ops) at Air HQ in the rank of Air Vice-Marshal.

After a short stint as SASO Central Air Command, Sareen took over South Western Air Command as AOC-in-C. After about a year, he moved onto as the AOC-in-C Western Air Command - India's Premier Air Command. It was in this capacity he received the PVSM in 1995. Sareen was posted back to Air HQ as the Vice Chief of Air Staff responsible for all IAF defensive & offensive operations and intelligence activities.

Finally, in December 1995, he was promoted to Air Chief Marshal to take over as the Chief of the Air Staff, Indian Air Force. His tenure saw the nuclear tests in Pokhran. Within the Air force, it saw wide-ranging changes in the strategic, operational, training, maintenance and flight safety doctrines & performance of the IAF. Particular attention paid to the welfare of serving and retired Air Force personnel and their families. Air Chief Marshal Sareen retired on 31 December 1998, handing over the charge to Air Chief Marshal Anil Yashwant Tipnis.

Military offices
Preceded by Shankar Roychowdhury	Chairman of the Chiefs of Staff Committee; 01 October 1997 - 31 December 1998	Succeeded by Ved Prakash Malik
Preceded by Swaroop Kaul	Chief of the Air Staff (India); 1995–1998	Succeeded by Anil Tipnis
