= Shankar Roychowdhury =

Chief of Army Staff of the Indian Army

General Shankar Roy Chowdhury PVSM ADC
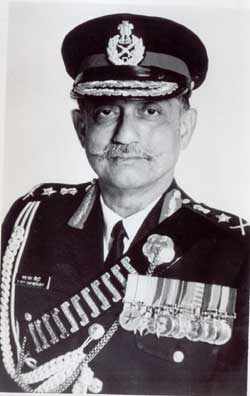

37th Chairman of the Chiefs of Staff Committee
- In office 1 October 1996 – 30 September 1997
- President: Shankar Dayal Sharma; K. R. Narayanan
- Prime Minister: P. V. Narasimha Rao; Atal Bihari Vajpayee; H. D. Deve Gowda; Inder Kumar Gujral
- Preceded by: Vijai Singh Shekhawat
- Succeeded by: Satish Sareen

17th Chief of Army Staff
- In office 22 November 1994 – 30 September 1997
- President: Shankar Dayal Sharma; K. R. Narayanan
- Prime Minister: P. V. Narasimha Rao; Atal Bihari Vajpayee; H. D. Deve Gowda; Inder Kumar Gujral
- Preceded by: Bipin Chandra Joshi
- Succeeded by: Ved Prakash Malik

Member of Parliament, Rajya Sabha
- In office 19 August 1999 – 18 August 2005
- Constituency: West Bengal

Personal details
- Born: 6 September 1937 (age 88) Calcutta, Bengal Province, British India

Military service
- Allegiance: India
- Branch/service: Indian Army
- Years of service: 1957–1997
- Rank: General
- Unit: 20 Lancers
- Commands: Army Training Command (ARTRAC); 16 Corps
- Battles/wars: Indo-Pakistani War of 1965, Bangladesh Liberation War
- Service number: IC-8417
- Awards: Param Vishisht Seva Medal

General Shankar Roy Chowdhury PVSM ADC is a former Chief of Army Staff of the Indian Army, and a former member of the Indian Parliament.

== Early life ==
General Roychowdhury was born in Kolkata, West Bengal, India into the Zamindar family of Taki (India), a Bengali Kayastha family, on 6 September 1937. He received his schooling at St. Xavier's Collegiate School in Kolkata and later at Wynberg Allen School, Mussoorie and St. George's College, Mussoorie. He then became a cadet in the Joint Services Wing of the Indian Armed Forces in 1953.

== Military career ==
General Shankar Roychowdhury was commissioned into the 20 Lancers of the Indian Army Armoured Corps on 9 June 1957, after graduating from the Indian Military Academy. He took part in the Indo-Pakistani War of 1965 in the Chamb-Jaurian sector, and in Jessore and Khulna during the Bangladesh Liberation War in 1971. He commanded the 20 Lancers from 1974 to 1976, an Independent Armoured Brigade from December 1980 to July 1983, and an Armoured Division from May 1988 to May 1990. He subsequently commanded the 16 Corps in Jammu and Kashmir from 1991 to 1992.

He is a graduate of the Indian Military Academy Dehradun, National Defence Academy Pune, Defence Services Staff College, Army War College; National Defence College and also holds a Doctorate D.Litt. (Honoris CAVSA). He held several staff and instructional appointments, including that of Director General Combat Vehicles dealing with the Arjun tank.

He was awarded the Param Vishisht Seva Medal for distinguished service to the Indian Army and the nation. He took over as GOC-in-C, Army Training Command (ARTRAC) in August 1992. He assumed charge of the Indian Army as the 18th Chief of Army Staff on 22 November 1994, upon the untimely death of his predecessor, General B.C. Joshi. He retired from the Indian Army on 30 September 1997, after 40 years of military service.

== Post-retirement ==
After retirement from the Army, General Roychowdhury became a member of the Rajya Sabha, where he highlighted defence related issues. Since 21 January 2008, he has been a Director of Indian Metal & Ferro Alloys Ltd. His autobiography titled Officially at Peace was published by Penguin Books in 2002.

== Honours and decorations ==

Param Vishisht Seva Medal	Samar Seva Star	Poorvi Star	Paschimi Star
Raksha Medal	Sangram Medal	Sainya Seva Medal	High Altitude Service Medal
25th Anniversary of Independence Medal	30 Years Long Service Medal	20 Years Long Service Medal	9 Years Long Service Medal

== Dates of rank ==
Insignia	Rank	Component	Date of rank
	Second Lieutenant	Indian Army	9 June 1957
	Lieutenant	Indian Army	9 June 1959
	Captain	Indian Army	9 June 1963
	Major	Indian Army	9 June 1970
	Lieutenant Colonel	Indian Army	1976
	Colonel	Indian Army	24 October 1982
	Brigadier	Indian Army	12 April 1983
	Major General	Indian Army	2 January 1988
	Lieutenant General	Indian Army	1 July 1991
	General (COAS)	Indian Army	22 November 1994

Military offices
Preceded by S. K. Kaul	Chairman of the Chiefs of Staff Committee; 1 October 1996 – 30 September 1997	Succeeded by Satish Sareen
Preceded by Bipin Chandra Joshi	Chief of Army Staff; 1994–1997	Succeeded by Ved Prakash Malik
