= Shashindra Pal Tyagi =

20th Chief of Air Staff of the Indian Air Force

Air Chief Marshal Shashindra Pal Tyagi
- Born: March 14, 1945 (age 81); Indore, Indore State, British Raj (now in Madhya Pradesh, India)
- Military career
- Allegiance: India
- Branch: Indian Air Force
- Service years: 31 December 1963 – 2007
- Rank: Air Chief Marshal
- Nickname: Bundle
- Commands: Central Air Command; South Western Air Command; Western Air Command; Indian Air Force
- Conflicts: Indo-Pakistani War of 1965; Indo-Pakistani War of 1971

Air Chief Marshal Shashindra Pal Tyagi, more commonly known as S P Tyagi, is an Indian Air Force officer who served as the 20th Chief of Air Staff of the Indian Air Force and served from 31 December 2004 to 31 March 2007. He was succeeded by Air Chief Marshal Fali Homi Major.

== Controversies ==
Tyagi was briefly named in an Italian Investigation into bribes paid to secure a Helicopter Contract, although further information created doubts in the matter. As per the unverified testimony of an Italian businessman, he received illegal payments to change the technical specifications of the helicopters which favored AgustaWestland which was finally awarded the deal. However, further investigation showed that the technical specifications were changed prior to his tenure on the orders of Brajesh Mishra, the National Security Adviser, in the Prime Minister's office (PMO). According to the investigators, 21 million euros (about Rs 150 crore) were paid as kickbacks under the cover of engineering contracts reportedly through companies IDS Tunisia and IDS India. A businessman named Sanjeev 'Julie' Tyagi, a close relative of S P Tyagi, one of the key suspects in the VVIP helicopter scandal, has denied reports filed in an Italian court, saying he had nothing to do with the 2010 defence deal. Detailed government documents revealed that the decision taken to change the technical specification were suggested and agreed upon by stake holders from multiple government agencies, including the Prime Minister's Office, the Special Protection Group (SPG), and others.

In April 2016, an Italian court said there was "reasonable belief that corruption took place" in the 2010 VVIP helicopter deal and that former Indian Air Force chief SP Tyagi was involved. Following necessary investigations, Tyagi was arrested by the Indian Central Bureau of Investigation on 9 December 2016.

In December 2016, Italy's Highest Court ordered a retrial of the case. In January 2018, the Italian courts said there was "insufficient proof that any bribery took place" and acquitted Giussepe Orsi (ex CEO) and Bruno Spagnolini (head of helicopter division) of all charges.

Military offices
Preceded by Arun Prakash	Chairman of the Chiefs of Staff Committee; 2006-2007	Succeeded by Joginder Jaswant Singh
Preceded by Srinivasapuram Krishnaswamy	Chief of Air Staff; 31 December 2004 – 31 March 2007	Succeeded by Fali Homi Major
