= Central Air Command (India) =

Regional Air Command of The Indian Air Force

Central Air Command, Indian Air Force
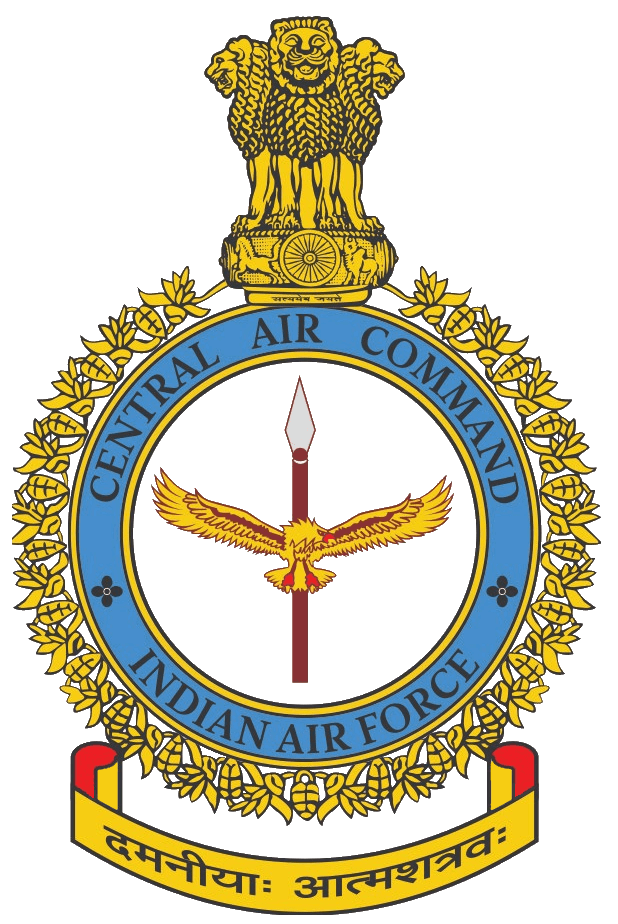
- Emblem of the Central Air Command
- Founded: March 3, 1962; 64 years ago
- Country: India
- Branch: Indian Air Force
- Type: Operational Air Command
- Role: Air Defence, OCA, Offensive Ground Support, Airlift.
- Size: Fighter jets: 80-100 (approx); Other aircraft: 60-80 (approx); Personnel: 20,000 (approx)
- Headquarters: Prayagraj
- Motto: Damniyah Atmashatravah
- Engagements: 1962 Sino-Indian War, East Pakistan Operations 1971, Operation Meghdoot, Orissa Super-Cyclone Relief, 1999

Commanders
- Air Officer Commanding-in-Chief: Air Marshal Tarun Chaudhry

The Central Air Command is one of the five operational commands of the Indian Air Force. It is currently headquartered in Prayagraj in Uttar Pradesh. It was formed on 19 March 1962, at Rani Kuthee, Calcutta.

== History ==
Due to the possibility of war with China, No. 1 Operational Group was formed on 27 May 1958 at Ranikuthee in Calcutta, to look after all the units. In 1959, it was upgraded to Eastern Air Force (EAF). In 1962, after the Sino-Indian War, EAF was moved to Shillong and Central Air Command (CAC) was formed on 19 March 1962 with its headquarters at Rani Kuthee, Calcutta (now Kolkata). Calcutta was considered an inappropriate location for the Central Air Command Headquarters and it was relocated to Allahabad in February 1966.

During the Indo-Pakistani War of 1965, CAC English Electric Canberras carried out 163 bombing and 33 close air support sorties against Pakistani forces, and raided Pakistan Air Force airbases at Mauripur, Multan, Sargodha, Peshawar, and Chaklala. Squadron Leader Charanjit Singh and Flt Lt Mangat Singh made a 'brilliant raid' on the night of 13–14 September 1965, by carrying out a major air base attacks at Peshawar. Three Mahavir Chakras were awarded to the members of Canberra squadrons. In a major attack, seven Canberras of No. 35 Squadron attacked the oil storage tanks at Karachi, destroying about 60% of Pakistan's oil reserves.

On 3 November 1988, during the 1988 Maldives coup d'état, Indian troops were airlifted to Maldives in two CAC Ilyushin Il-76s and landed at Hulule airport on a dark unlit runway. By 2.30am on 4 November the Indian forces completed their mission and safely brought back the President of Maldives.

In operation "Safed Sagar" during the Kargil war in 1999, CAC played a prominent role by successfully carrying out attacks on enemy bases.

The IAF's first exercise with a foreign air force (Garud) took place with the French Air Force in Gwalior in 2003 and CAC participated in an eight-day exercise. A number of joint exercises have been conducted with the United States Air Force, Royal Air Force, the Singapore Air Force and South African Air Force at Gwalior and Agra.

== Organization ==
Squadrons include:

Squadron	Base	Equipment	Notes
No. 12 Squadron IAF	Agra Air Force Station	An-32	No. 4 Wing IAF
N/A Flying Squadron	Agra Air Force Station	C-295	No. 4 Wing IAF
No. 8 Squadron IAF	Bareilly Air Force Station	Su-30MKI	No. 15 Wing IAF
No. 24 Squadron IAF	Bareilly Air Force Station	Su-30MKI	No. 15 Wing IAF
No. 111 Helicopter Unit, IAF	Bareilly Air Force Station	HAL Dhruv	No. 15 Wing IAF
No. 16 Squadron IAF	Gorakhpur Air Force Station	SEPECAT Jaguar IS	No. 17 Wing IAF
No. 27 Squadron IAF	Gorakhpur Air Force Station	SEPECAT Jaguar IS	No. 17 Wing IAF
No. 105 Helicopter Unit, IAF	Gorakhpur Air Force Station	Mi-17V-5	No. 17 Wing IAF
No. 1 Squadron IAF	Maharajpur Air Force Station	Mirage-2000H	No. 40 Wing IAF
No. 7 Squadron IAF	Maharajpur Air Force Station	Mirage-2000H	No. 40 Wing IAF
No. 9 Squadron IAF	Maharajpur Air Force Station	Mirage-2000	No. 40 Wing IAF
TACDE	Maharajpur Air Force Station	Su-30 MKI, Dassault Mirage 2000	No. 40 Wing IAF

== List of Air Officer Commanding-in-Chief ==
List of Air Officer Commanding-in-Chief
Rank	Name	From	To
Air Vice Marshal	Shivdev Singh	10 June 1963	4 March 1966
Air Vice Marshal	Kundan Lal Sondhi	5 March 1966	31 December 1966
Air Vice Marshal	Hari Chand Dewan	1 January 1967	28 March 1968
Air Vice Marshal	Hrushikesh Moolgavkar	29 March 1968	31 March 1971
Air Vice Marshal	Maurice Barker	1 April 1971	15 June 1972
Air Vice Marshal	Bandi Sreeramulu Krishnarao	16 June 1972	25 June 1972
Air Marshal	Bandi Sreeramulu Krishnarao	26 June 1972	26 June 1974
Air Marshal	Idris Hasan Latif	27 June 1974	29 February 1976
Air Marshal	George Kanishtkumar John	1 March 1976	31 January 1977
Air Marshal	Gian Dev Sharma	1 February 1977	31 December 1978
Air Marshal	Trilochan Singh Brar	10 February 1979	20 September 1981
Air Marshal	Balwant Wickram Chauhan	21 September 1981	31 December 1983
Air Marshal	Denis Anthony Lafontaine	1 January 1984	31 October 1984
Air Marshal	Ripu Daman Sahni	6 November 1984	31 May 1986
Air Marshal	Johney William Greene	1 June 1986	31 March 1987
Air Marshal	Nirmal Chandra Suri	1 April 1987	29 February 1988
Air Marshal	Mohinder Singh Bawa	1 March 1988	31 December 1990
Air Marshal	Swaroop Krishna Kaul	11 February 1991	30 April 1992
Air Marshal	Pondicherry Jayarao Jayakumar	1 May 1992	28 February 1993
Air Marshal	Naresh Kumar	1 March 1993	31 May 1995
Air Marshal	Dev Nath Rathore	1 June 1995	30 June 1996
Air Marshal	Vinod Patney	1 July 1996	31 March 1997
Air Marshal	Srinivasapuram Krishnaswamy	1 April 1997	30 November 1997
Air Marshal	Vinod Kumar Bhatia	1 December 1997	31 October 1999
Air Marshal	Vinod Patney	1 November 1999	31 July 2000
Air Marshal	Vinod Kumar Verma	1 August 2000	30 April 2002
Air Marshal	Shashindra Pal Tyagi	1 May 2002	31 January 2003
Air Marshal	Brijendra Mohan Bali	1 February 2003	31 March 2004
Air Marshal	Raghu Rajan	1 April 2004	30 April 2005
Air Marshal	Jaspal Singh Gujral	1 May 2005	31 October 2006
Air Marshal	Pradeep Vasant Naik	1 November 2006	31 December 2007
Air Marshal	Packiam Paul Rajkumar	1 January 2008	30 June 2009
Air Marshal	Gurdip Singh Kochar	1 July 2009	31 October 2011
Air Marshal	Arup Raha	1 November 2011	31 May 2012
Air Marshal	Jasvinder Chauhan	1 June 2012	31 July 2014
Air Marshal	Kulwant Singh Gill	1 August 2014	31 December 2015
Air Marshal	Shyam Bihari Prasad Sinha	1 January 2016	31 December 2018
Air Marshal	Rajesh Kumar	1 January 2019	31 January 2021
Air Marshal	Amit Tiwari	1 February 2021	31 May 2021
Air Marshal	Richard John Duckworth	1 July 2021	30 June 2022
Air Marshal	Amar Preet Singh	1 July 2022	31 January 2023
Air Marshal	Ravi Gopal Krishana Kapoor	1 February 2023	31 August 2024
Air Marshal	Ashutosh Dixit	1 September 2024	30 April 2025
Air Marshal	Balakrishnan Manikantan	1 May 2025	31 May 2026
Air Marshal	Tarun Chaudhry	1 June 2026	Incumbent

== Operations ==
The CAC mainly patrols the North Central part of India. It has airbases at Agra, Bareilly, Gorakhpur, Gwalior and Prayagraj and some units are located at Bihta, Darbhanga, Bakshi-ka-Talab, Nagpur, Kanpur, Nainital, Memaura and Varanasi.

The CAC operates fixed-wing aircraft such as the Mirage 2000, Antonov An-32, Ilyushin Il-76 and Dornier 228; and helicopters such as the Mil Mi-8, Mil Mi-17 and Mil Mi-26.

== See also ==
- Indian Air Force
- No. 22 Squadron, Indian Air Force
- Operation Meghdoot
- Orissa Super Cyclone
