= No. 29 Squadron IAF =

No. 29 Squadron
- Active: 10 March 1958 – 27 December 2019
- Country: Republic of India
- Branch: Indian Air Force
- Role: Fighter
- Garrison/HQ: Jodhpur AFS
- Nickname(s): "Scorpions"
- Motto(s): Sadaiv Sachet; Ever Alert

Aircraft flown
- Attack: MiG-27UPG (retired)

No. 29 Squadron (Scorpions) was a fighter squadron equipped with MiG-27UPG and based at Jodhpur AFS. The squadron was disbanded on 27 December 2019 with retirement of MiG-27.

== Aircraft ==
Aircraft	From	To	Air Base
Dassault Ouragan	10 March 58	May 1958	AFS Halwara
MiG-21 FL	February 1967	May 2007	Jodhpur AFS
MiG-27 UPG	May 2007	27 December 2019	Jodhpur AFS
