= Ved Prakash Malik =

Former chief of the Indian Army

General Ved Prakash Malik PVSM, AVSM
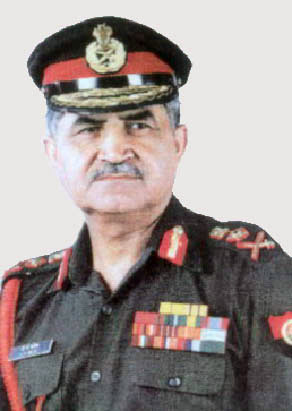

39th Chairman Chiefs of Staff Committee
- In office 1 January 1999 – 30 September 2000
- President: K. R. Narayanan
- Prime Minister: Atal Bihari Vajpayee
- Preceded by: Satish Sareen
- Succeeded by: Sushil Kumar

18th Chief of the Army Staff
- In office 1 October 1997 – 30 September 2000
- President: K. R. Narayanan
- Prime Minister: Inder Kumar Gujral; Atal Bihari Vajpayee
- Preceded by: Shankar Roy Chowdhury
- Succeeded by: Sundararajan Padmanabhan

21st Vice Chief of Army Staff
- In office 1 August 1996 – 30 September 1997
- President: Shankar Dayal Sharma; K. R. Narayanan
- Prime Minister: H. D. Deve Gowda; Inder Kumar Gujral
- Preceded by: M.L. Dar
- Succeeded by: Chandra Shekhar

Personal details
- Born: 1 November 1939 (age 86) Dera Ismail Khan, North West Frontier Province, British India (now Khyber Pakhtunkhwa, Pakistan)
- Spouse: Dr. Ranjana Malik
- Children: Namita, Maj Gen Sachin Malik

Military service
- Allegiance: India
- Branch/service: Indian Army
- Years of service: June 1959 – September 2000
- Rank: General
- Unit: 3 Sikh Light Infantry
- Commands: Southern Army; XI Corps; 8th Mountain (Infantry) Division; 162nd Infantry Brigade; 10 Sikh Light Infantry
- Battles/wars: Kargil War; Operation Cactus
- Award(s): Param Vishisht Seva Medal; Ati Vishisht Seva Medal

General Ved Prakash Malik PVSM, AVSM (born 1 November 1939) served as the 18th Chief of Army Staff of the Indian Army from 30 September 1997 to 30 September 2000. He was the Army Chief during the Kargil War.

== Honours and decorations ==

	Param Vishisht Seva Medal	Ati Vishisht Seva Medal	
Samanya Seva Medal	Poorvi Star	Special Service Medal	Raksha Medal
Sangram Medal	Sainya Seva Medal	High Altitude Service Medal	50th Anniversary of Independence Medal
25th Anniversary of Independence Medal	30 Years Long Service Medal	20 Years Long Service Medal	9 Years Long Service Medal

== Dates of rank ==
Insignia	Rank	Component	Date of rank
	Second Lieutenant	Indian Army	7 June 1959
	Lieutenant	Indian Army	7 June 1961
	Captain	Indian Army	7 June 1965
	Major	Indian Army	7 June 1972
	Lieutenant-Colonel	Indian Army	10 March 1978
	Colonel	Indian Army	8 February 1985
	Brigadier	Indian Army	2 April 1986
	Major General	Indian Army	25 September 1990
	Lieutenant-General	Indian Army	26 January 1993
	General (COAS)	Indian Army	1 October 1997

== Advisor ==
Currently, he is a member of the Board of Advisors of India's International Movement to Unite Nations (I.I.M.U.N.).

== Publications ==
- Kargil: From Surprise to Victory. HarperCollins. 2010. ISBN 9788172239671
- Operation Cactus: Drama in the Maldives. HarperCollins. 2013. ISBN 9789351361343

Military offices
Preceded by Satish Sareen	Chairman of the Chiefs of Staff Committee; 1 January 1999-30 September 2000	Succeeded by Sushil Kumar
Preceded by Shankar Roychowdhury	Chief of Army Staff; 1997–2000	Succeeded by Sundararajan Padmanabhan
Preceded by Moti Dar	General Officer Commanding-in-Chief Southern Command; 1995–1996	Succeeded by H M Khanna
Preceded by B S Nalwa	Commandant of the Defence Services Staff College; 1994–1995	Succeeded by Baldev Singh
