= Srinivasapuram Krishnaswamy =

Former chief of the Indian Air Force

Air Chief Marshal S. Krishnaswamy PVSM, AVSM, VM**, ADC
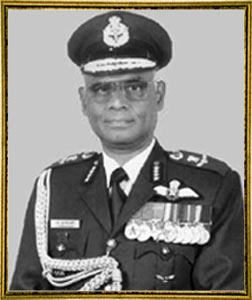
- Born: 18 January 1943 (age 83); Madras, Tamil Nadu, India
- Military career
- Allegiance: India
- Branch: Indian Air Force
- Service years: 1961 – 2004
- Rank: Air Chief Marshal
- Unit: No. 3 Squadron IAF
- Commands: No. 35 Squadron IAF; Lohegaon Air Force Station; Central Air Command; South Western Air Command; Western Air Command
- Conflicts: Indo-Pakistani War of 1965; Indo-Pakistani War of 1971; Kargil War
- Awards: Param Vishisht Seva Medal; Ati Vishisht Seva Medal; Vayu Sena Medal (Bar); Vayu Sena Medal

Air Chief Marshal Srinivasapuram Krishnaswamy PVSM, AVSM, VM & Bar, ADC (born January 1943) is a former Air Officer in the Indian Air Force (IAF). He served as the 19th Chief of the Air Staff from 2001 to 2004. He raised the first electronic warfare squadron in the Indian Air Force. He has the rare distinction of having commanded three operational commands of the IAF - the Western, South-Western and Central Air Commands.

== Early life and education ==
Krishnaswamy was born on 18 January 1943 in Srinivasapuram, Madras. He completed his schooling as well as his college education in the same city.

== Military career ==
Krishnaswamy was commissioned as a fighter pilot in December 1961. In the early years of his service, he flew the Hawker Hunter, the Folland Gnat and the Mikoyan-Gurevich MiG-21. During the Indo-Pakistani War of 1965, he flew the Gnats and was mentioned in dispatches. Subsequently, he was trained in the United Kingdom to become a test pilot. On his return, he joined the Aircraft and System Training Establishment (ASTE). He qualified as a fighter combat leader and served as a senior directing staff at the premier Tactics and Air Combat Development Establishment (TACDE). For his tenure at TACDE, he was awarded the Vayu Sena Medal on 26 January 1978.

Krishnaswamy specialised in electronic warfare (EW) and raised and commanded the first EW Squadron of the IAF. The squadron consisted of MiG-21 and English Electric Canberra aircraft. For his stint as commanding officer of the squadron, he was awarded the bar to the Vayu Sena Medal on 26 January 1982. He subsequently served as the Deputy Air Advisor to the High Commissioner of India to the United Kingdom at India House, London. Promoted to the rank of Group Captain, he served as the Chief Operations Officer of the Maharajpur Air Force Station in Gwalior.

=== Air rank ===
Krishnaswamy attended the prestigious National Defence College, New Delhi as part of the 25th course in 1985. After the course, he took over as the Director of Air Staff requirements at Air headquarters. He was promoted to the substantive rank of air commodore on 1 September 1988. In January 1990, he took command of the premier base for the Mikoyan MiG-29 and SEPECAT Jaguar maritime aircraft - Lohegaon Air Force Station. In February 1993, Krishnaswamy was promoted to the acting rank of air vice marshal and moved to Air HQ, taking over as the assistant chief of air staff (plans). After a three-year stint as ACAS Plans, he was promoted to the rank of air marshal and was appointed deputy chief of air staff (DCAS). On 26 January 1996, he was awarded the Ati Vishisht Seva Medal.

Krishnaswamy was promoted to commander-in-chief grade on 1 April 1997 and appointed air officer commanding-in-chief Central Air Command at Allahabad. After a short stint, he was appointed AOC-in-C South Western Air Command (SWAC) at Jodhpur in November. On 26 January 1998, he was awarded the Param Vishisht Seva Medal for distinguished service of the highest order. Under Krishnaswamy, in view of the increased operational importance of SWAC, it was decided by Air HQ that the headquarters of SWAC would move from Jodhpur to Gandhinagar. He oversaw this move and the new HQ SWAC was inaugurated on 1 May 1998 by the then Chief Minister of Gujarat Keshubhai Patel. He served in this appointment during the Kargil War. He was awarded the Agni Award for Self Reliance in August 1999 for promoting indigenous development in the Indian Armed services. On 1 November 1999, he was appointed AOC-in-C of the premier Western Air Command (WAC). He took command from Air Marshal Vinod Patney at HQ WAC. He thus has the rare distinction of having commanded three operational commands of the IAF.

On 1 August 2001, Krishnaswamy moved to Air HQ after being appointed Vice Chief of the Air Staff. On 30 October 2001, the Government of India announced that Krishnaswamy was appointed the next Chief of the Air Staff.

=== Chief of Air Staff ===
Krishnaswamy took over as the 19th Chief of the Air Staff on 31 December 2001 from Air Chief Marshal Anil Yashwant Tipnis. He served as full tenure of three years and relinquished command on 31 December 2004, handing over to Air Chief Marshal Shashindra Pal Tyagi.

== Awards and decorations ==

Param Vishisht Seva Medal	Ati Vishisht Seva Medal		Vayu Sena Medal (Bar)
General Service Medal	Samar Seva Star	Siachen Glacier Medal	Raksha Medal
Sangram Medal	Sainya Seva Medal	High Altitude Service Medal	50th Anniversary Independence Medal
25th Anniversary Independence Medal	30 Years Long Service Medal	20 Years Long Service Medal	9 Years Long Service Medal

== Dates of rank ==
Insignia	Rank	Component	Date of rank
	Pilot Officer	Indian Air Force	19 December 1961
	Flying Officer	Indian Air Force	19 December 1962
	Flight Lieutenant	Indian Air Force	19 December 1966
	Squadron Leader	Indian Air Force	19 December 1972
	Wing Commander	Indian Air Force	22 January 1980
	Group Captain	Indian Air Force	30 November 1984
	Air Commodore	Indian Air Force	1 September 1988
	Air Vice Marshal	Indian Air Force	29 July 1993
	Air Marshal	Indian Air Force	1 February 1996
	Air Chief Marshal (CAS)	Indian Air Force	31 December 2001

Military offices
Preceded by Madhvendra Singh	Chairman of the Chiefs of Staff Committee; 2004-2004	Succeeded by Nirmal Chander Vij
Preceded by Anil Yashwant Tipnis	Chief of the Air Staff; 2001 – 2004	Succeeded by Shashindra Pal Tyagi
Preceded by Vinod Patney	Vice Chief of the Air Staff; 2001 – 2001	Succeeded by Satish Govind Inamdar
Preceded by Vinod Patney	Air Officer Commanding-in-Chief Western Air Command; 1999 – 2001	Succeeded by Vinod Bhatia
Preceded by S R Deshpande	Air Officer Commanding-in-Chief South Western Air Command; 1997 – 1999	Succeeded by Vinod Bhatia
Preceded by Vinod Patney	Air Officer Commanding-in-Chief Central Air Command; 1997 – 1997	Succeeded by Vinod Bhatia
Preceded by S R Deshpande	Deputy Chief of the Air Staff (India); 1996–1996	Succeeded by Man Mohan Singh Vasudeva
