= S. K. Kaul =

Indian Chief of Air Staff (1935–2025)

Air Chief Marshal Swaroop Krishna Kaul PVSM, MVC, ADC
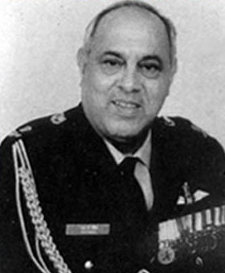

16th Chief of Air Staff
- In office 1 August 1993 – 31 December 1995
- President: Shankar Dayal Sharma
- Prime Minister: P. V. Narasimha Rao
- Preceded by: Nirmal Chandra Suri
- Succeeded by: Satish Sareen

Personal details
- Born: 20 December 1935 Lucknow, United Provinces, British India
- Died: 19 February 2025 (aged 89)
- Education: Besant College, Varanasi. Government College, Allahabad
- Awards: Param Vishist Seva Medal (PVSM); Maha Vir Chakra (MVC)

Military service
- Allegiance: India
- Branch/service: Indian Air Force
- Years of service: 1954–1995
- Rank: Air Chief Marshal
- Commands: Western Air Command; Central Air Command; 37 Squadron
- Battles/wars: Indo-Pakistani War of 1971

Air Chief Marshal Swaroop Krishna Kaul, PVSM, MVC, ADC (20 December 1935 – 19 February 2025) was Chief of the Air Staff of the Indian Air Force. Kaul served as the Air Chief from 1993 to 1995.

== Background ==
Swaroop Krishna Kaul was born in Lucknow, Uttar Pradesh on 20 December 1935, into a Kashmiri Pandit family, to K K Kaul. He did his schooling from Besant college in Varanasi and his graduation from Government College, Allahabad in 1951.

Kaul died on 19 February 2025, at the age of 89.

== Career ==
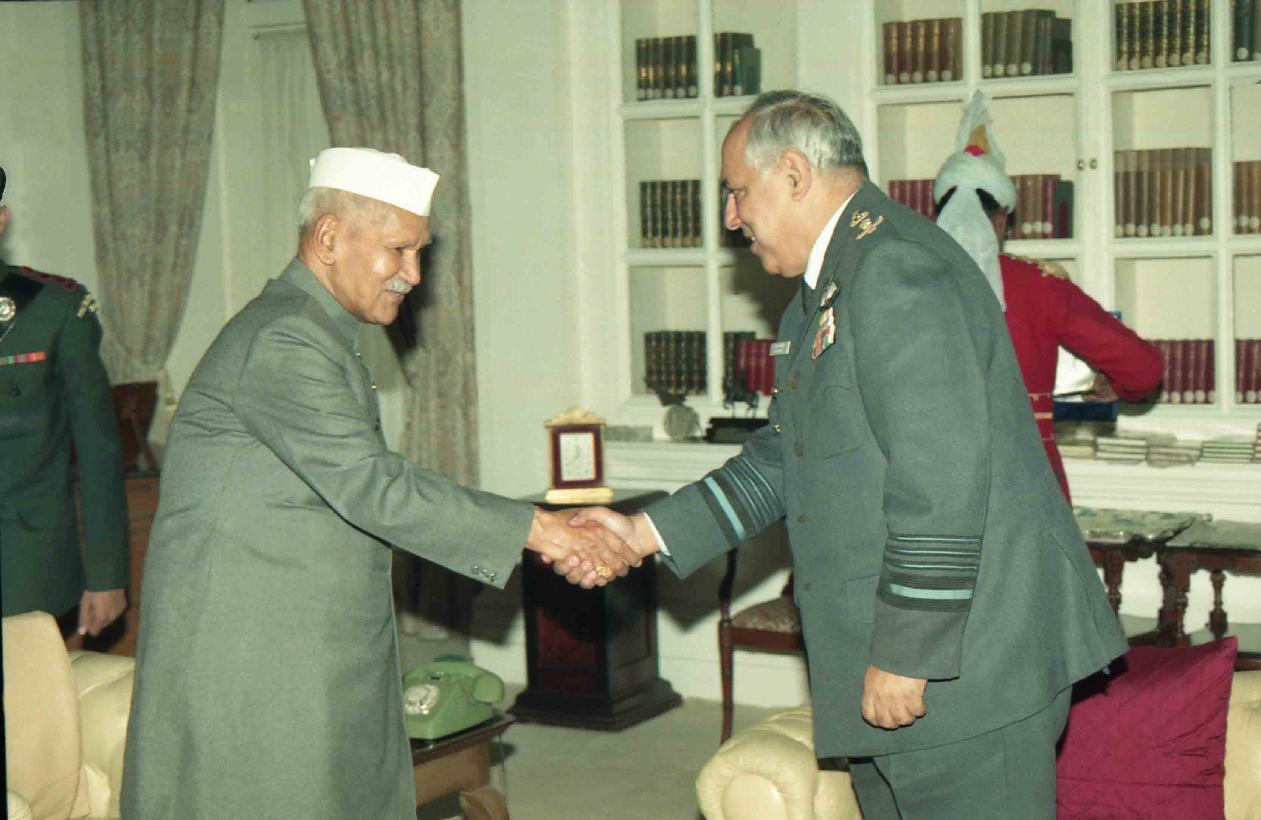
Air Chief Marshal S.K. Kaul, Chief of the Air Staff pays farewell call on the President of India, Dr. Shankar Dayal Sharma, at Rashtrapati Bhavan in New Delhi

Kaul joined the National Defence Academy in 1951 and was commissioned in the IAF on 17 July 1954

During the Indo-Pakistani war of 1971, as a Wing Commander Kaul led several missions into the Pakistani held areas of East Pakistan (now Bangladesh) to photograph strategically vital areas.

As commanding officer of 37 Squadron, he was awarded the Maha Vir Chakra, the second highest war-time military decoration in India.

After commanding the Central Air Command and the Western Air Command, Kaul took over as the 16th Chief of the Air Staff of the Indian Air Force.

In November 1994, Kaul was appointed as the Chairman of the Chiefs of Staff Committee. He retired from the Air Force in December 1995. He had over 3,700 hours of accident free flying to his credit.

== Awards ==
Kaul was awarded the Maha Vir Chakra for a show of conspicuous gallantry during the 1971 war and the Param Vishisht Seva Medal in 1992.

CITATION
WING COMMANDER SWAROOP KRISHNA KAUL

(Effective date of award – 4 December 1971)

At the outbreak of hostilities, Wing Commander Swaroop Krishna Kaul, the Commanding Officer of a fighter bomber squadron volunteered for an urgent task to photograph certain areas which were badly needed in order to finalise our Army's assault plans. The officer carried out four missions deep into enemy territories to cover the heavily defended sectors of Comilla, Sylhet and Saidpur. At times, Wing Commander Kaul had to fly as low as 200 feet over the most heavily defended enemy locations. Undaunted, he flew through these barrages, making repeated runs in each of his missions, and successfully completed the task. On 4th December, 1971, Wing Commander Kaul again volunteered for another task, to photograph the Tezgaon and Kurmitola airfields. His reconnaissance flights over these two airfields, in the face of the most sustained and heavy enemy ground fire stand out as acts of heroism, extreme gallantry and devotion to duty. In addition to his reconnaissance exploits, Wing Commander Kaul led the very first eight aircraft strike mission over Dacca. In this raid, his formation encountered four enemy aircraft near the target area. With exemplary leadership, Wing Commander Kaul maneuvered his force in such a manner that two of the enemy aircraft were shot down and the other two fled. The target thus became clear for attack. Throughout the period of operations Wing Commander Swaroop Krishna Kaul displayed conspicuous gallantry, determination and professional skill.

Military offices
Preceded by Bipin Chandra Joshi	Chairman of the Chiefs of Staff Committee; 20 November 1994 – 31 December 1995	Succeeded by Shankar Roychowdhury
Preceded by Nirmal Chandra Suri	Chief of the Air Staff (India); 1993–1995	Succeeded by Satish Sareen
