= No. 48 Squadron IAF =

No. 48 Squadron Camels
- Crest of The No. 48 Squadron IAF "Camels"
- Active: 15 November 1959- Present
- Country: Republic of India
- Allegiance: Indian Armed Forces
- Branch: Indian Air Force
- Role: Transport
- Garrison/HQ: AFS Chandigarh
- Nickname: "Camels"
- Mottos: Sahasa phalit Sarvetrah; Courageous Always Succeed

Aircraft flown
- Transport: AN-32

No. 48 Squadron IAF nicknamed as Camels is a unit of the Indian Air Force assigned to Maintenance Command. The Squadron participates in operations involving air, land and airdrop of troops, equipment, supplies, and support or augment special operations forces, when appropriate.

== History ==
The Camels were raised in 1959 at Barrackpore and moved to the present location in May 1986. No. 48 Squadron has flown missions in the ladakh Sector during the Sino- Indian conflict of 1962. It has formed an aerial bridge for the Indian Forces in J&K sector across the Himalayan Ranges. Other than regular air landing and air drop missions in Siachen glacier, Karakoram ranges, Indus and Shyok valleys, the Sqn has been undertaking air landing operations to Kargil Advanced landing grounds as well towards Operation Sadbhavna.

The Sqn has proved its worth in overseas missions like Operation Pawan, Operation Cactus and Kabul relief operations.

=== Lineage ===
- Constituted as No. 48 Squadron (Camels) on 15 November 1959

=== Assignments ===
- Indo-Pakistani War of 1965
- Indo-Pakistani War of 1971
- Operation Pawan
- Operation Cactus

=== Aircraft ===
- C-119 - Decommissioned
- C-82 - Decommissioned
- AN-32
