= Anil Yashwant Tipnis =

Indian Air Chief Marshal

Air Chief Marshal Anil Yashwant Tipnis PVSM, AVSM, VM, ADC

18th Chief of Air Staff
- In office 31 December 1998 - 31 December 2001
- President: K. R. Narayanan
- Prime Minister: Atal Bihari Vajpayee
- Preceded by: Satish Sareen
- Succeeded by: Srinivasapuram Krishnaswamy

24th Vice Chief of the Air Staff
- In office 1 April 1997 - 31 December 1998
- President: Shankar Dayal Sharma; K. R. Narayanan
- Prime Minister: H. D. Deve Gowda; Inder Kumar Gujral; Atal Bihari Vajpayee
- Preceded by: Trevor Raymond Joseph Osman
- Succeeded by: Prithvi Singh Brar

Personal details
- Born: 15 September 1940 (age 86)
- Education: National Defence Academy, Pune

Military service
- Allegiance: India
- Branch/service: Indian Air Force
- Years of service: 20 May 1960 – 31 December 2001
- Rank: Air Chief Marshal
- Unit: No. 7 Squadron IAF
- Commands: Western Air Command; AFS Gwalior; 23 Squadron
- Battles/wars: Kargil War; Indo-Pakistani War of 1971; Indo-Pakistani War of 1965
- Awards: Param Vishisht Seva Medal; Ati Vishisht Seva Medal; Vayu Sena Medal

Air Chief Marshal Anil Yashwant Tipnis, PVSM, AVSM, VM, ADC (born 15 September 1940) served as Chief of the Air Staff of the Indian Air Force from 31 December 1998 to 31 December 2001. He commanded the Air Force to distinction during the Kargil War, when the force flew air superiority and close air support at heights of over 18,000 feet

== Early life and education ==
Anil Yashwant Tipnis was born on 15 September 1940. He did his education at Barnes School, Deolali. After his schooling, he joined the National Defence Academy, (NDA) Pune in January 1956.

== Career ==
Tipnis was commissioned as a fighter pilot on 28 May 1960. He spent his initial years as an operational pilot in several front line fighter squadrons.

During the Indo-Pakistani War of 1965, Tipnis served with The First Supersonics, the 28 Squadron. After the war, Tipnis was deputed to Iraq as a Pilot Attack Instructor (PAI).

Tipnis qualified as a Fighter Combat Leader at the Tactics and Air Combat Development Establishment (TACDE) in 1973.

After attending the Staff College course at the Defence Services Staff College, Wellington, Wing Commander Tipnis took command of 23 Squadron equipped with Mig 21 Bison. After this stint, Tipnis was also short-listed (one among four) for the Interkosmos space program.

As an Air Commodore, Tipnis commanded Air Force Station Gwalior which was equipped with Mirage 2000.

He attended the Defence Studies Course at National Defence College in 1989. On promotion to Two-star rank, AVM Tipnis was appointed Assistant Chief of the Air Staff (Inspection) at Air HQ. He later took over as Air Officer Commanding (AOC) J & K Area.

As an Air Marshal, Tipnis served as Senior Air Staff Officer (SASO) of Eastern Air Command and of Western Air Command. He later served as the Air Officer Commanding-in-Chief of the Western Air Command from August 1995 to March 1997.

Tipnis then moved to Air HQ and served as the Vice Chief of the Air Staff before taking over as the 18th Chief of the Air Staff.

== Awards and decorations ==

Param Vishisht Seva Medal	Ati Vishisht Seva Medal		Vayu Sena Medal
Meritorious Service Medal	Siachen Glacier Medal	Raksha Medal	Sangram Medal
Sainya Seva Medal	High Altitude Service Medal	Videsh Seva Medal	50th Anniversary Independence Medal
25th Anniversary Independence Medal	30 Years Long Service Medal	20 Years Long Service Medal	9 Years Long Service Medal

Military offices
Preceded by Satish Sareen	Chief of the Air Staff (India); 31 December 1998 – 31 December 2001	Succeeded by Srinivasapuram Krishnaswamy
