= Nirmal Chander Vij =

20th Chief of Army Staff

General Nirmal Chander Vij PVSM, UYSM, AVSM
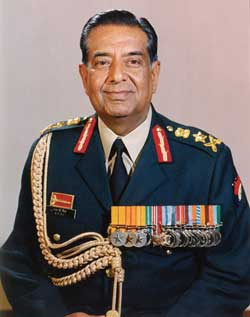

20th Chief of the Army Staff
- In office 1 January 2003 – 31 January 2005
- President: A. P. J. Abdul Kalam
- Prime Minister: Atal Bihari Vajpayee Manmohan Singh
- Preceded by: Sundararajan Padmanabhan
- Succeeded by: J. J. Singh

Personal details
- Born: 3 January 1943 (age 83) Jammu, State of Jammu and Kashmir, British Raj (now in Jammu, Jammu and Kashmir, India)
- Awards: Param Vishisht Seva Medal; Uttam Yudh Seva Medal; Ati Vishisht Seva Medal

Military service
- Allegiance: India
- Branch/service: Indian Army
- Years of service: 1962–2005
- Rank: General
- Unit: Dogra Regiment
- Commands: Southern Army; IV Corps; XXI Corps
- Battles/wars: Sino-Indian War; Kargil war

General Nirmal Chander Vij PVSM, UYSM, AVSM (born 3 January 1943, in Jammu) was the 20th Chief of Army Staff of the Indian Army. He held the office from 1 January 2003 to 31 January 2005.

== Early life and education ==
General Vij was born on 3 January 1943 at Jammu. He completed his studies at the SRML Higher Secondary School, Jammu and joined the National Defence Academy (NDA) in 1959. He was commissioned into the Dogra Regiment on 11 December 1962.

== Military career ==
Within weeks of his commissioning, he saw action in the Walong sector in the 1962 Indo-China War. Since then he has served in the eastern sector six times, the last time being as the General officer commanding IV Corps. Vij has served as the General staff officer of an infantry division, a director in the Military Operations Directorate as a colonel and deputy director general of perspective planning (strategic planning) as a brigadier at Army HQ in New Delhi.

Vij served as the Major General General Staff (MGGS) at the Western Command in Chandimandir, Chandigarh (Punjab). During the 1999 Kargil War, he served as the Director General Military Operations (DGMO). In 1999, he broke the military tradition to brief members of the Bharatiya Janata Party (BJP) on operations in Kargil. He was criticized for appearing, in his professional capacity before a group of senior BJP leaders, and briefing them.

For his services as the DGMO, he was awarded the Uttam Yudh Seva Medal. He was involved with the planning and execution of Operation Khukri – to extricate trapped Indian peacekeeping troops in Sierra Leone. The formations he has commanded include a mountain brigade involved in active counter-insurgency operations in the north east, an elite RAPID (Reorganised Army Plains Infantry Division) unit, the XXI Strike Corps based at Bhopal, Madhya Pradesh and the IV Corps based at Tezpur, Assam. He is also a recipient of the Param Vishisht Seva Medal (PVSM). On 1 October 2000, Vij was appointed the GOC of Southern Command at Pune and led the army's rescue efforts during the 2001 Gujarat earthquake. In October 2001, he was appointed the Vice Chief of Army Staff (VCOAS) at New Delhi and in January 2002, he was appointed the 10th Colonel of the Dogra Regiment and the Dogra Scouts.

He was appointed the Chairman Chiefs of Staff Committee (COSC) on 1 January 2005. He is married to Rita Vij and they have a son, Nalin, who is a software engineer in the United States. General Vij retired on 31 January 2005, after completing more than 42 years service.

== Post-retirement ==
He was the founder-Vice Chairman of the National Disaster Management Authority, in 2005, with an equivalent rank of a Union Minister of State. He was the Director of the Vivekananda International Foundation think tank in New Delhi. In 2021, his book "The Kashmir Conundrum: The Quest for Peace in a Troubled Land" was published by Harper Collins.

== Recent controversy ==
Builders by name Adarsh Housing Cooperative Society have been constructing buildings in the prime government land in Mumbai. The permission for construction on this government land has been taken in name of providing the affordable accommodation to war widows and the land had been reserved for this purpose. However, many politicians, top military officials, other bureaucrats and their relatives have taken the ownership of the flats. Ashok Chavan, former chief minister of Maharashtra, resigned under pressure for his role in this scam. CBI is probing the scam. Gen. N. C. Vij along with two other former military chiefs – General Deepak Kapoor, and Admiral Madhvendra Singh offered to give up their apartments.

== Awards ==

	Param Vishisht Seva Medal	Uttam Yudh Seva Medal	
Vishisht Seva Medal	Samanya Seva Medal	Special Service Medal	Paschimi Star
Operation Vijay Star	Siachen Glacier Medal	Raksha Medal	Sangram Medal
Operation Vijay Medal	Sainya Seva Medal	High Altitude Service Medal	50th Anniversary of Independence Medal
25th Anniversary of Independence Medal	30 Years Long Service Medal	20 Years Long Service Medal	9 Years Long Service Medal

== Dates of rank ==
Insignia	Rank	Component	Date of rank
	Second Lieutenant	Indian Army	11 December 1962
	Lieutenant	Indian Army	11 December 1964
	Captain	Indian Army	11 December 1968
	Major	Indian Army	11 December 1975
	Lieutenant-Colonel	Indian Army	20 October 1982
	Colonel	Indian Army	28 May 1986
	Brigadier	Indian Army	25 September 1990
	Major General	Indian Army	1 October 1993
	Lieutenant-General	Indian Army	1 November 1996 (seniority from 3 June 1996)
	General (COAS)	Indian Army	1 January 2003

Military offices
Preceded by Srinivasapuram Krishnaswamy	Chairman of the Chiefs of Staff Committee; 2004–2005	Succeeded by Arun Prakash
Preceded by Sundararajan Padmanabhan	Chief of Army Staff; 2003–2005	Succeeded by Joginder Jaswant Singh
Preceded by Sundararajan Padmanabhan	General Officer Commanding-in-Chief Southern Command; 2000–2001	Succeeded by Gurbaksh Singh Sihota
