= Bikram Singh (general, born 1952) =

24th Chief of the Army Staff (India)

General Bikram Singh PVSM, UYSM, AVSM, SM, VSM, ADC
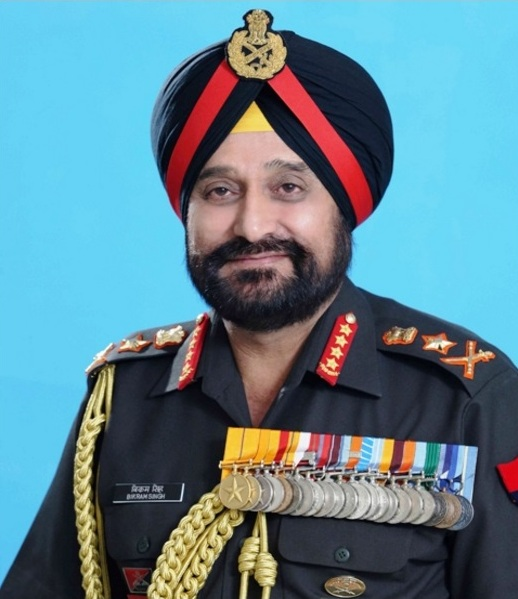

24th Chief of the Army Staff
- In office 1 June 2012 – 31 July 2014
- President: Pratibha Patil; Pranab Mukherjee
- Prime Minister: Manmohan Singh; Narendra Modi
- Preceded by: V. K. Singh
- Succeeded by: Dalbir Singh Suhag

Personal details
- Born: 19 July 1952 (age 74) Amritsar, East Punjab, India
- Spouse: Surjeet Kaur
- Education: National Defence Academy; Indian Military Academy; United States Army War College; The Punjab Public School, Nabha
- Awards: Param Vishisht Seva Medal; Ati Vishisht Seva Medal; Vishisht Seva Medal; Uttam Yudh Seva Medal; Sena Medal; Commander of the Legion of Merit

Military service
- Allegiance: India
- Branch/service: Indian Army
- Years of service: 31 March 1972 – 31 July 2014
- Rank: General
- Unit: Sikh Light Infantry
- Commands: Chairman, Chiefs of Staff Committee; Chief of the Army Staff; Eastern Command; XV Corps; 10th Infantry Division

General Bikram Singh, PVSM, UYSM, AVSM, SM, VSM, ADC (born 19 July 1952) is a retired Indian army officer who served as the 24th Chief of Army Staff (COAS) of the Indian Army. Previously the General Officer Commanding-in-Chief of the army's Eastern Command, he succeeded General V. K. Singh as COAS on May 31, 2012. He retired on 31 July 2014. He is the second Sikh to be COAS, the first having been General J. J. Singh. He was also the Chairman of the Chiefs of Staff Committee (CoSC) of the Indian armed forces.

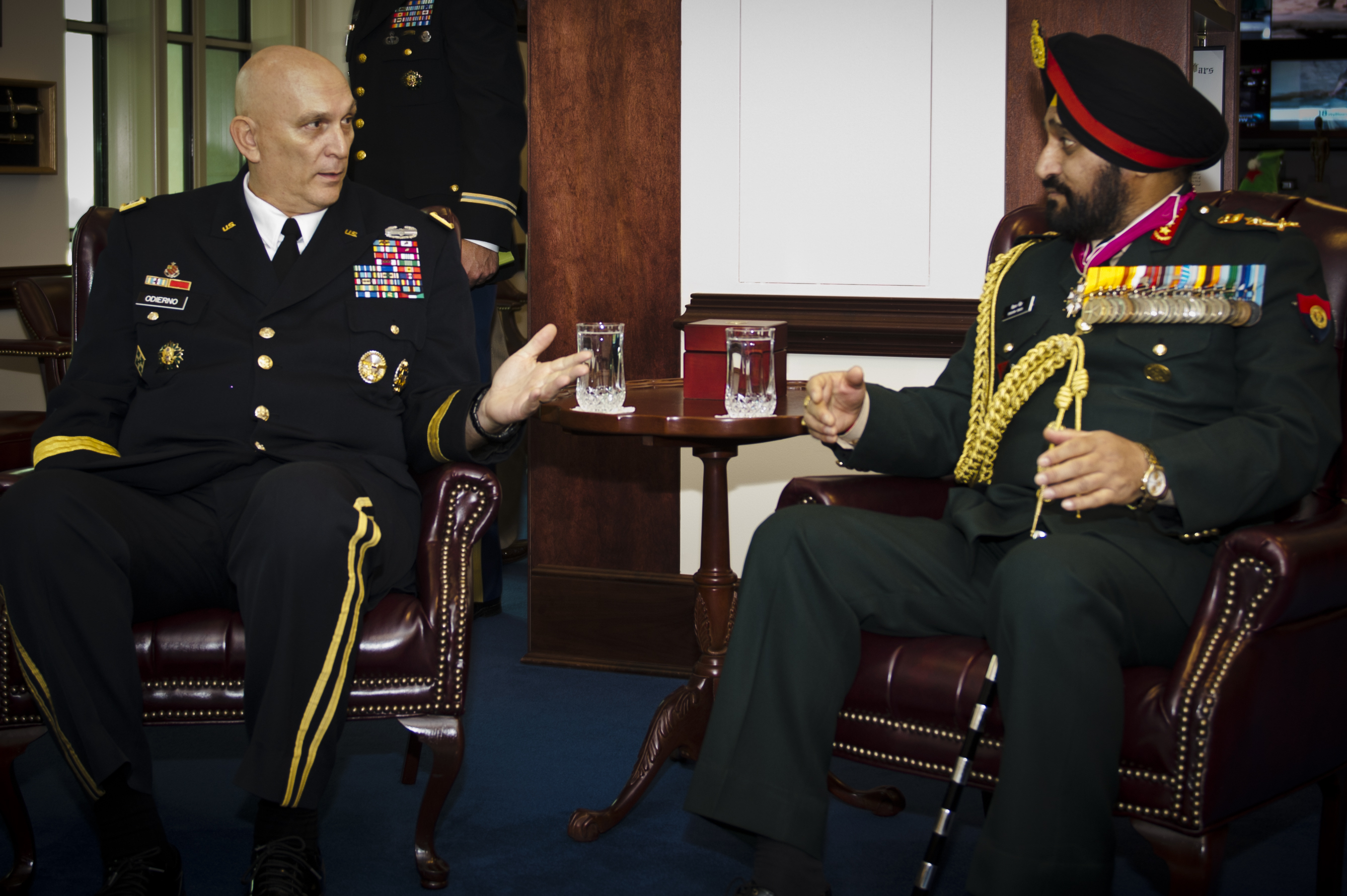
Chief of Staff of the United States Army, General Raymond T. Odierno speaking with Singh during an office call to The Pentagon in December 2013.

== Military career ==
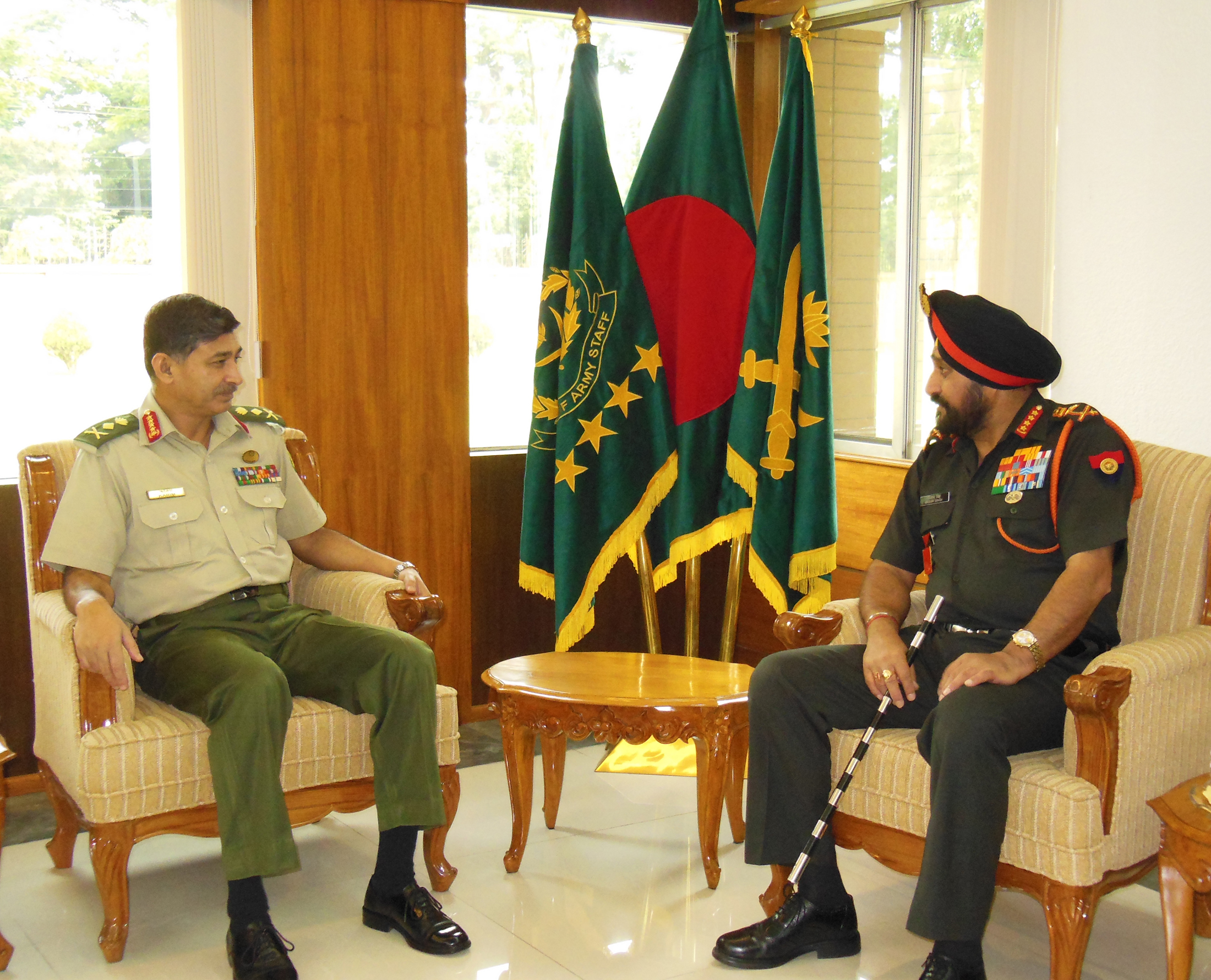
General Singh in India-Bangladesh Joint Meeting in October 2012 with Bangladeshi Chief of Army Staff, General Iqbal Karim Bhuiyan.

Born in Amritsar, he spent his early childhood with his family at Jammu. In 1962, he joined the Punjab Public School, Nabha. The future chief had considered becoming a doctor as he was an exceptional student of Zoology and Biology. But the wars of 1962 and 1965 motivated him to join the NDA in 1968. When asked whether he ever regrets the choice made, Bikram said, "If I were ever to be born again, I would only join the Indian Army."

A graduate of the 40th course at the National Defence Academy, Singh was commissioned into the Sikh Light Infantry on 31 March 1972. On passing out from IMA, he was awarded J&K Rifles Gold Medal in Leadership and Tactics and the Shrinagesh trophy in firing. He was adjudged the 'Best Young Officer' at the Young Officer's course at the Infantry School and was also awarded both the Commando Dagger for being the best commando and the 'Best in Tactics' trophy. He later was an instructor at the Commando and Weapons Wings of the Infantry School.

He is also a graduate of the Defence Services Staff College, Wellington, Higher Command Course at Army War College, Mhow and US Army War College, Pennsylvania, USA, where he also won the ‘Annual Public Speaking Award’. Later in December 2013, he was inducted into the US Army War College ‘International Fellows Hall of Fame’. On 18 October 2013, he was awarded ‘The Legion of Merit’ by the United States government for exceptionally meritorious conduct in the performance of outstanding services.

The General’s Academic Qualifications include MSc (Defence Studies) from Madras University in 1986, M Phil (Defence & Management Studies) from Devi Ahilya Vishwavidyalaya, Indore in 1997 and Master of Strategic Studies from US Army War College, Carlisle, Pennsylvania, USA in 2004. In addition, the General was conferred with two Honorary Degrees of ‘Doctorate of Science’ by SGGS World University, Punjab in 2016 by the Chief Minister of Punjab and GNDU, Amritsar on 31 May 2018 by the Union HRD Minister Prakash Javadekar.

Gen Bikram Singh has served in three UN missions in Nicaragua (ONUCA), El Salvador (ONUSAL) and the Democratic Republic of Congo (MONUC). While in the first two missions he was the Chief operations Officer, in MONUC, he was the General Officer Commanding of a Multinational Division in the Democratic Republic of Congo. His Division contributed immensely in the initiation of ‘Goma Peace Process’. During his tenure in Congo, the former Chief of Army Staff of the Pakistan Army Qamar Javed Bajwa served under his command as a brigade commander.

He has been the President of Indian Golf Union from 2012 to 2013 and the President of Indian Polo Association from June 2012 to 31 July 2014.

After completing the Higher Command Course, he served his first tenure as a Director in the Military Operations (MO) Directorate. The tenure coincided with the Kargil War and he was the official spokesperson of the Army during that period. He went on to serve four important tenures at Army HQ: an additional tenure in the MO Directorate as the Deputy Director General, two tenures in the Perspective Planning Directorate, as the Deputy Director General of Perspective Planning (Strategy) and later, as the Additional Director General. He was posted back to the Army HQ as a Lieutenant General to serve as the Director General Staff Duties before taking over as Eastern Army Commander. Colleagues remember him for being a 'soldier's soldier' for spending time and working hard with his troops on the ground.

He has held positions of General Officer-Commanding-in-Chief Eastern Command, XV Corps, GOC 10th Infantry Division, Commander of Rashtriya Rifles Sector and GOC of the Multi-National Eastern Division in the Democratic Republic of the Congo. He was wounded while posted as a Brigadier in Jammu & Kashmir, where he has spent much of his service.

== Retirement ==
Bikram Singh retired as Chief of Army Staff on 31 July 2014. He was succeeded by General Dalbir Singh Suhag. Post retirement he has continuously expressed views on strategic Mountain Strike Corps (MSC), with presentations.

== Family ==
Bikram Singh is married to Surjeet Kaur and the couple has two children.

== Awards and decorations ==

	Param Vishisht Seva Medal	Uttam Yudh Seva Medal	
Ati Vishisht Seva Medal	Sena Medal	Vishisht Seva Medal	Wound Medal
General Service Medal - Mizo Hills	Special Service Medal	Sangram Medal	Operation Vijay Medal
Operation Parakram Medal	Sainya Seva Medal	High Altitude Service Medal	Videsh Seva Medal
50th Independence Anniversary Medal	25th Independence Anniversary Medal	30 Years Long Service Medal	20 Years Long Service Medal
9 Years Long Service Medal	ONUSAL	ONUCA	UNMIK
Commander of the Legion of Merit (United States)

== Dates of rank ==
Insignia	Rank	Component	Date of rank
	Second Lieutenant	Indian Army	31 March 1972
	Lieutenant	Indian Army	31 March 1974
	Captain	Indian Army	31 March 1978
	Major	Indian Army	31 July 1984
	Lieutenant-Colonel	Indian Army	1 April 1992
	Colonel	Indian Army	1 January 1995
	Brigadier	Indian Army	29 March 2002
	Major General	Indian Army	1 March 2006
	Lieutenant-General	Indian Army	25 November 2008 (seniority from 1 November)
	General (COAS)	Indian Army	1 June 2012

Military offices
Preceded by Norman Anil Kumar Browne	Chairman of the Chiefs of Staff Committee; 2014	Succeeded by Arup Raha
Preceded by Vijay Kumar Singh	Chief of Army Staff; 2012–2014	Succeeded by Dalbir Singh Suhag
Preceded by Vijay Kumar Singh	General Officer-Commanding-in-Chief Eastern Command; 2010 - 2012	Succeeded by Dalbir Singh Suhag
