= Pradeep Vasant Naik =

Chief of the Air Staff of the Indian Air Force from 2009 to 2011

Air Chief Marshal Pradeep Vasant Naik PVSM, VSM
- Born: 22 July 1949 (age 77); Nagpur, Central Provinces and Berar, India (now in Maharashtra)
- Military career
- Allegiance: India
- Branch: Indian Air Force
- Service years: 21 June 1969 – 2012
- Rank: Air Chief Marshal
- Commands: Central Air Command; AFS Bidar; 26 Squadron
- Conflicts: Indo-Pakistani War of 1971
- Awards: Param Vishisht Seva Medal; Vishisht Seva Medal
- Other work: Honorary Aides-de-Camp (ADC) to the President of India

Air Chief Marshal Pradeep Vasant Naik, PVSM, VSM served as the 22nd Chief of the Air Staff of the Indian Air Force. He took office on 31 May 2009 following the retirement of Air Chief Marshal Fali Homi Major and was succeeded in office by Air Chief Marshal Norman Anil Kumar Browne.

== Career ==
Naik was born on 22 July 1949 at Nagpur, Maharashtra and was commissioned into the Indian Air Force on 21 June 1969 as a fighter pilot. He is an alumnus of Sainik School, Satara and National Defence Academy, Khadakwasla in Maharashtra. During his 42 years of service, he has served in a variety of command staff and instructional appointments.

Naik has over 3,000 hrs of flying on his log. He also took part in air actions during the Indo-Pakistani War of 1971 in the Eastern and Western sectors. Before taking over as Chief of Air Staff, he was the Vice Chief of Air Staff of the Indian Air Force. Naik has also served as the Air Officer Commanding-in-Chief of the Allahabad-based, Central Air Command.

Besides being a fellow of the National Defence College, New Delhi, Naik is a Qualified Flying Instructor and a Fighter Combat Leader. He has served as Directing staff at Defence Services Staff College (DSSC) Wellington, India and at Tactics and Air Combat Development Establishment (TACDE).

== Advisor ==
Currently, he is a member of the Board of Advisors of India's International Movement to United Nations (I.I.M.U.N.).

== Personal life ==
Naik and his wife Madhubala have two sons; the elder son, Group Captain Vivek Naik was a fighter pilot (Mig 29) with the Indian Air Force and later transferred to the transport stream, and the younger son, Vineet is a Chief Officer in the Merchant Navy.

== Awards ==

Param Vishisht Seva Medal	Vishisht Seva Medal		General Service Medal
Samanya Seva Medal	Poorvi Star Medal	Paschimi Star Medal	Special Service Medal
Sangram Medal	Operation Parakram Medal	Sainya Seva Medal	50th Anniversary Independence Medal
25th Anniversary Independence Medal	30 Years Long Service Medal	20 Years Long Service Medal	9 Years Long Service Medal

Military offices
Preceded by Fali Homi Major	Chief of the Air Staff (India); 31 May 2009 – 31 July 2011	Succeeded by Norman Anil Kumar Browne
Preceded by Deepak Kapoor	Chairman of the Chiefs of Staff Committee; 30 March 2010 – 30 July 2011	Succeeded by Nirmal Kumar Verma
