= Jaswant Singh Marwah =

Indian Army officer and journalist

- Born: 21 January 1921; Rawalpindi, Punjab, British India
- Spouse: Rani Jaspal Kaur (m. 1943; died 2006)
- Relatives: Joginder Jaswant Singh (son)
- Military career
- Allegiance: British Raj; India
- Branch: British Indian Army; Indian Army
- Service years: 1943–1973
- Rank: Lieutenant-Colonel
- Service number: IC-9182
- Conflicts: Second World War

Lieutenant Colonel Jaswant Singh Marwah (born 21 January 1921) is an Indian former soldier, journalist and author, and the father of General Joginder Jaswant Singh, the first Sikh Chief of Army Staff of the Indian Army. He was a former Special Duty Officer in the Archaeological Survey of India, and served in the Indian Army's Electrical Mechanical Engineering branch from 1943 to 1973. A veteran of the Second World War, he received an emergency commission in the Royal Indian Army Service Corps on 27 June 1943. He was awarded the Nehru Award in 1981 and 1984, by the Vice President of India and the President of India respectively. In 1987 he was awarded the Journalism Award by the Indian Ministry of Communications.

Marwah wrote and published nine books. All his published books were sent to over 100 universities in India, and other educational establishments by the Government of India, Punjabi Academy and Hindi Academy.

== Sources ==
- India Daily: , 28 November 2004.
- The Tribune: , 4 July 2007.
- India News Online: , 29 November 2004.
