= Sundararajan Padmanabhan =

Indian Army General (1940–2024)

General Sundararajan Padmanabhan PVSM, AVSM, VSM
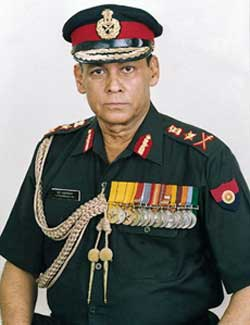

41st Chairman of the Chiefs of Staff Committee
- In office 30 December 2001 – 31 December 2002
- President: K. R. Narayanan; A. P. J. Abdul Kalam
- Prime Minister: Atal Bihari Vajpayee
- Preceded by: Sushil Kumar
- Succeeded by: Madhvendra Singh

19th Chief of the Army Staff
- In office 1 October 2000 – 31 December 2002
- President: K. R. Narayanan; A. P. J. Abdul Kalam
- Prime Minister: Atal Bihari Vajpayee
- Preceded by: Ved Prakash Malik
- Succeeded by: Nirmal Chander Vij

Personal details
- Born: 5 December 1940 Trivandrum, Travancore, India (now Thiruvananthapuram, Kerala)
- Died: 18 August 2024 (aged 83) Chennai, Tamil Nadu, India
- Awards: Param Vishisht Seva Medal; Ati Vishisht Seva Medal; Vishisht Seva Medal
- Nickname: Paddy

Military service
- Allegiance: India
- Branch: Indian Army
- Service years: 1959–2002
- Rank: General
- Unit: Regiment of Artillery
- Commands: Southern Army; Northern Army; XV Corps

General Sundararajan Padmanabhan PVSM, AVSM, VSM (5 December 1940 – 18 August 2024) was a General Officer of the Indian Army. He served as the 19th Chief of Army Staff of the Indian Army. General Padmanabhan succeeded General V.P. Malik on 30 September 2000. He also served as Chairman of the Chiefs of Staff Committee.

== Early life and education ==
Padmanabhan was born in a Tamil Brahmin family. He was schooled at the Rashtriya Indian Military College, Dehradun. In 1956, Padmanabhan joined the National Defence Academy and then the Indian Military Academy, from where he graduated in 1959.

== Military career ==
Padmanabhan was commissioned into the Regiment of Artillery on 13 December 1959.

He attended the Defence Services Staff College, Wellington in 1973. Post this, he commanded an Independent Light Battery from 1975 to 1976. He then commanded the Gazala Mountain Regiment from 1977 to 1980. He also served as Instructor Gunnery at the School of Artillery, Deolali and two terms as an instructor at the Indian Military Academy.

As a Brigadier, he attended the prestigious National Defence College, New Delhi.

He resided in Chennai after retirement. Padmanabhan authored two books. He died in Chennai on 18 August 2024, at the age of 83.

== Books ==
Gen. Padmanabhan was also an author of Indian military fiction, including the 2004 novel Writing on the Wall, the plot of which involves India fighting a war simultaneously with Pakistan while improving relations with China.

== Honours and awards ==
=== Military awards ===

Param Vishisht Seva Medal	Ati Vishist Seva Medal		Vishisht Seva Medal
General Service Medal	Siachen Glacier Medal	Special Service Medal	Raksha Medal
Sangram Medal	Operation Vijay Medal	Sainya Seva Medal	50th Anniversary of Independence Medal
25th Anniversary of Independence Medal	30 Years Long Service Medal	20 Years Long Service Medal	9 Years Long Service Medal

== Dates of rank ==
Insignia	Rank	Component	Date of rank
	Second Lieutenant	Indian Army	13 December 1959
	Lieutenant	Indian Army	13 December 1961
	Captain	Indian Army	13 December 1965
	Major	Indian Army	13 December 1972
	Lieutenant-Colonel	Indian Army	16 August 1978
	Colonel	Indian Army	8 February 1985
	Brigadier	Indian Army	13 April 1986
	Major General	Indian Army	16 November 1991
	Lieutenant-General	Indian Army	1 November 1993
	General (COAS)	Indian Army	1 October 2000

Military offices
Preceded by Sushil Kumar	Chairman of the Chiefs of Staff Committee; 30 December 2001 – 31 December 2002	Succeeded by Madhvendra Singh
Preceded by Ved Prakash Malik	Chief of Army Staff; 2000–2002	Succeeded by Nirmal Chander Vij
Preceded by H M Khanna	General Officer Commanding-in-Chief Southern Command; 1999–2000	Succeeded by Nirmal Chander Vij
Preceded by	General Officer Commanding-in-Chief Northern Command; 1996–1998	Succeeded by H M Khanna
