= Government Sri Ranbir Model Higher Secondary School =

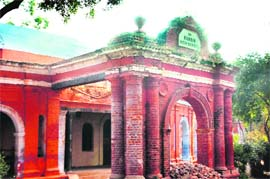
- Central building of school

Location
- Parade; Jammu, Jammu and Kashmir, 180001; India
- Coordinates: 32.73733°N 74.86393°E

Information
- Other names: SRML Jammu; Ranbir School Jammu
- Former names: Ranbir Pathshala; Government Sri Ranbir Multi-Lateral Higher Secondary School
- School type: Government boys school
- Motto: Quality Education For All
- Established: 1872
- Founder: Maharaja Ranbir Singh
- Educational authority: Jammu and Kashmir Board of School Education
- Principal: Anjali Gupta
- Age: 3 to 18
- Language: English
- Campus size: 5.1 acre
- Campus type: Urban
- Colors: Tomato and brown
- Website: http://srmlschool.com/

Government Sri Ranbir Model Higher Secondary School, commonly known as SRML School and Ranbir School, is a government all-boys higher secondary school in the Jammu district of Indian union territory of Jammu and Kashmir. It was the first high school of Jammu region, which was established by and named after Maharaja Ranbir Singh in the late 19th century to promote higher school education in the state, then known as Rabir pathshala. The school is currently affiliated with the Jammu and Kashmir Board of School Education (JKBOSE).

== History ==
The Dogra Ruler Maharaja Ranbir Singh founded the institute in 1872, and Maharaja Partap Singh completed its construction in 1884. At that time, it had the distinction of being the first school of its kind in the state.

The building between Tennis Hall and Canteen block was used as rasala for many years. The current office of the school was previously used by Dogra Rulers for delivering justice to the public, and the sangeet hall was utilised for conference and musical programs. The terrace of sangeet hall was used by queens to enjoy artist's performances. Before independence, the first information department operated from the commerce block for 10 years, and Radio Kashmir Jammu aired its programs from the tennis hall for 15 years. The army used one block as its base camp for seven years, While another building served as a stable for the horses of the Maharaja.

== Name history ==
Maharaja Ranbir Singh founded the institute in 1872, initially called as the Ranbir Pathshala. In 1905, it was named as Jammu Collegiate School. Later in 1965, it was renamed as Government Sri Ranbir Multi-Lateral Higher Secondary School. In 2015, it was renamed as Government Sri Ranbir Model Higher Secondary School, that is why it is commonly known as SRML Model Higher Secondary School, a combination of its earlier and current name.

== Administration and Campus ==
The school has a campus of 5.1 acres. Around 2000 students study in school with 140 teaching and non-teaching faculty. Ms Anjali Gupta is current principal of school. The school has 73 rooms, a library, laboratories, smart classes and an Information Communication Technology (ICT) lab. The campus also features an inhouse botanical garden. The school is surrounded by Parade ground and Women College Parade on one side and secretariat road on other. Rani Park commonly known as Zanana Park is just some footstep far from school.

== Academics ==
Till 2015, the school has only one academic section for higher studies. But in 2015, it has given the status of Heritage Model School after which it has been divided into three academics sections:

=== Nursery education ===
There is a nursery school for children age between 3–6 years with a capacity of 100 students for the weaker sections of the society. This includes children from Schedule Caste, Schedule Tribe and Other Backward Classes.

=== Middle education ===
A middle school for students between 1st–8th class and age between 6–14 years with a capacity of around 100 students there. It has never filled to the maximum capacity.

=== Higher education ===
The school is famous for its higher education. Around 96% of students came here for higher education. For class 9th and 10th there are two sections with five common and one optional subject. For class 11th and 12th there are science, commerce and arts stream. There is also a golden branch system for class 11th and 12th students according to which students with more than 80% marks get top faculty of school.

== Heritage status ==
From a long time, school administration has a demand to declare it as a heritage institution. And while keeping in mind to preserve its heritage outlook. Principal Anjali Gupta in an interview with Hindustan Times told "We are making efforts to renovate and repair the school, while preserving its heritage outlook. I will submit a detailed proposal to get heritage status." In 2015, it got the status of a "Heritage Model School", but it does not get any budgetary allocation for maintenance and preservation work.

== Notable alumni and faculty members ==
- K. L. Saigal
- Ram Nath Shastri
- Balraj Puri
- Narsingh Dev Jamwal
- Anil Goswami
- Nirmal Chander Vij
