= Sureesh Mehta =

Former Chief of the Indian Navy

Admiral Sureesh Mehta PVSM, AVSM
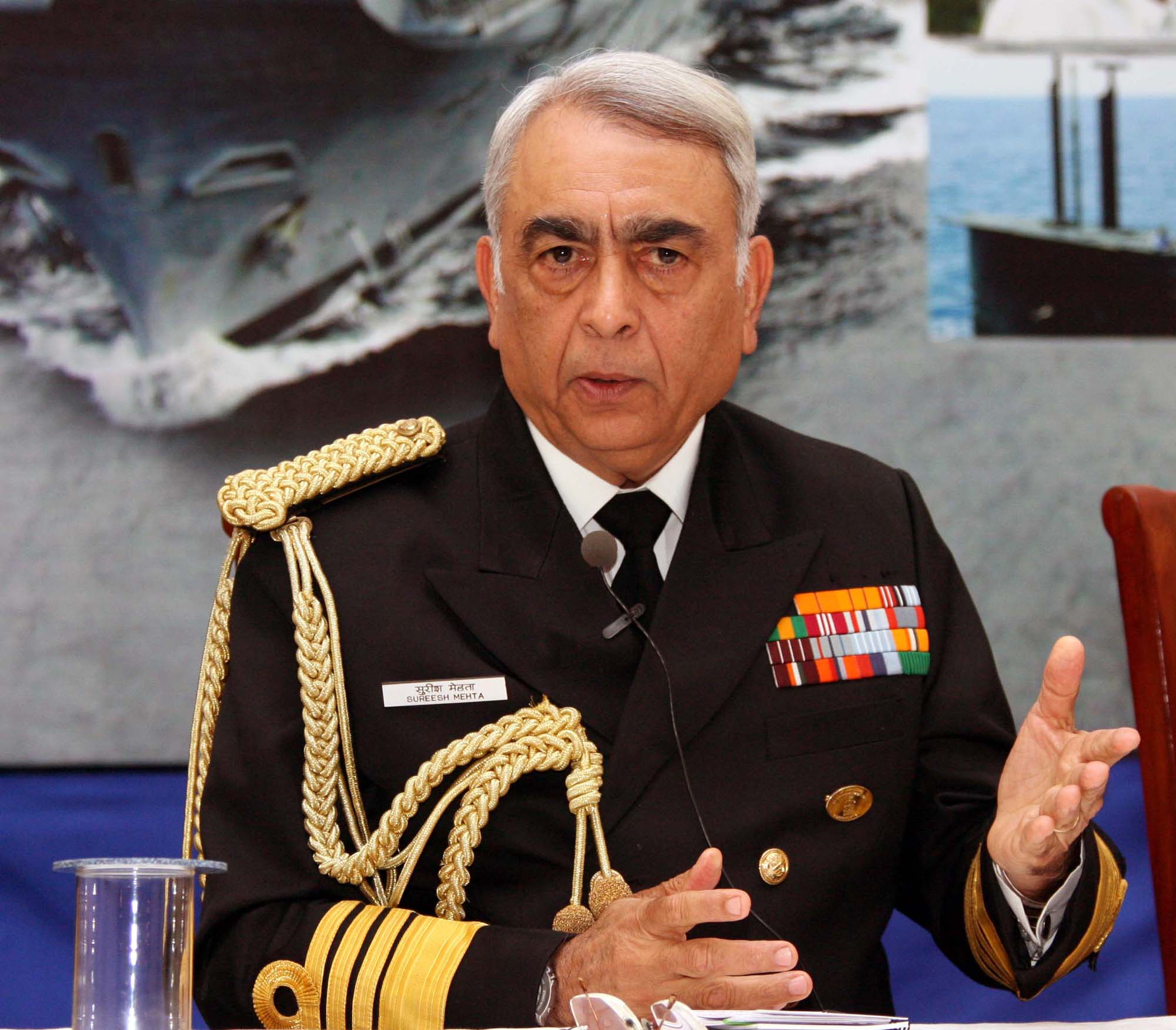
- Sureesh Mehta interacting with the media on the eve of the Navy Day 2007, in New Delhi

15th Indian High Commissioner to New Zealand
- In office December 2009 – December 2011
- Appointed by: President of India (then, Pratibha Patil)
- Preceded by: K. P. Ernest
- Succeeded by: Avanindra K. Pandey

48th Chairman of the Chiefs of Staff Committee
- In office 30 September 2007 – 31 August 2009
- President: Pratibha Patil
- Prime Minister: Manmohan Singh
- Preceded by: Joginder Jaswant Singh
- Succeeded by: Deepak Kapoor

19th Chief of the Naval Staff
- In office 31 October 2006 – 31 August 2009
- President: A. P. J. Abdul Kalam; Pratibha Patil
- Prime Minister: Manmohan Singh
- Preceded by: Arun Prakash
- Succeeded by: Nirmal Kumar Verma

Personal details
- Born: 18 August 1947 (age 79) Gurdaspur, Punjab, India
- Spouse: Maria Teresa Mehta

Military service
- Allegiance: India
- Branch/service: Indian Navy; Indian Coast Guard
- Years of service: 1967 – 2009
- Rank: Admiral
- Unit: Indian Naval Air Arm
- Commands: Eastern Naval Command; Western Fleet
- Battles/wars: Indo-Pakistani War of 1971; Operation Lal Dora; Kargil War
- Award(s): Param Vishist Seva Medal; Ati Vishist Seva Medal

Admiral Sureesh Mehta, PVSM, AVSM (born August 18, 1947) served as 19th Chief of the Indian Navy from 31 October 2006 until 31 August 2009. He was succeeded by Nirmal Kumar Verma. He is the first service chief from India's armed forces to be born post Indian Independence. He is married to Maria Teresa Mehta, and they have two children.

== Early life ==
Admiral Mehta was born on 18 August 1947 at Gurdaspur, Punjab in a Hindu Punjabi Khatri Family. He studied in the National Defence Academy before joining the Indian Navy. Later, he also graduated from the Defence Services Staff College and the National Defence College.

== Military career ==
After graduating, Admiral Mehta joined the Fleet Air Arm of the Indian Navy, where he flew the Hawker Sea Hawk off the aircraft carrier, INS Vikrant. He was the Flag Officer Commanding Western Fleet during the Kargil War. Later, he served as the Flag Officer Commanding-in-Chief (FOC-in-C) of the Eastern Naval Command (ENC) from 30 September 2005 till his appointment as the Naval Chief. He was appointed the Chairman of the Chiefs of Staff Committee (COSC) on 28 September 2007.

== Awards and distinctions ==
In 1995, Admiral Mehta was awarded the Ati Vishist Seva Medal. In 2005, he received the Param Vishist Seva Medal.

== High Commissioner to New Zealand ==
After retirement, the Indian government appointed him as India's High Commissioner to New Zealand.

== Awards and decorations ==
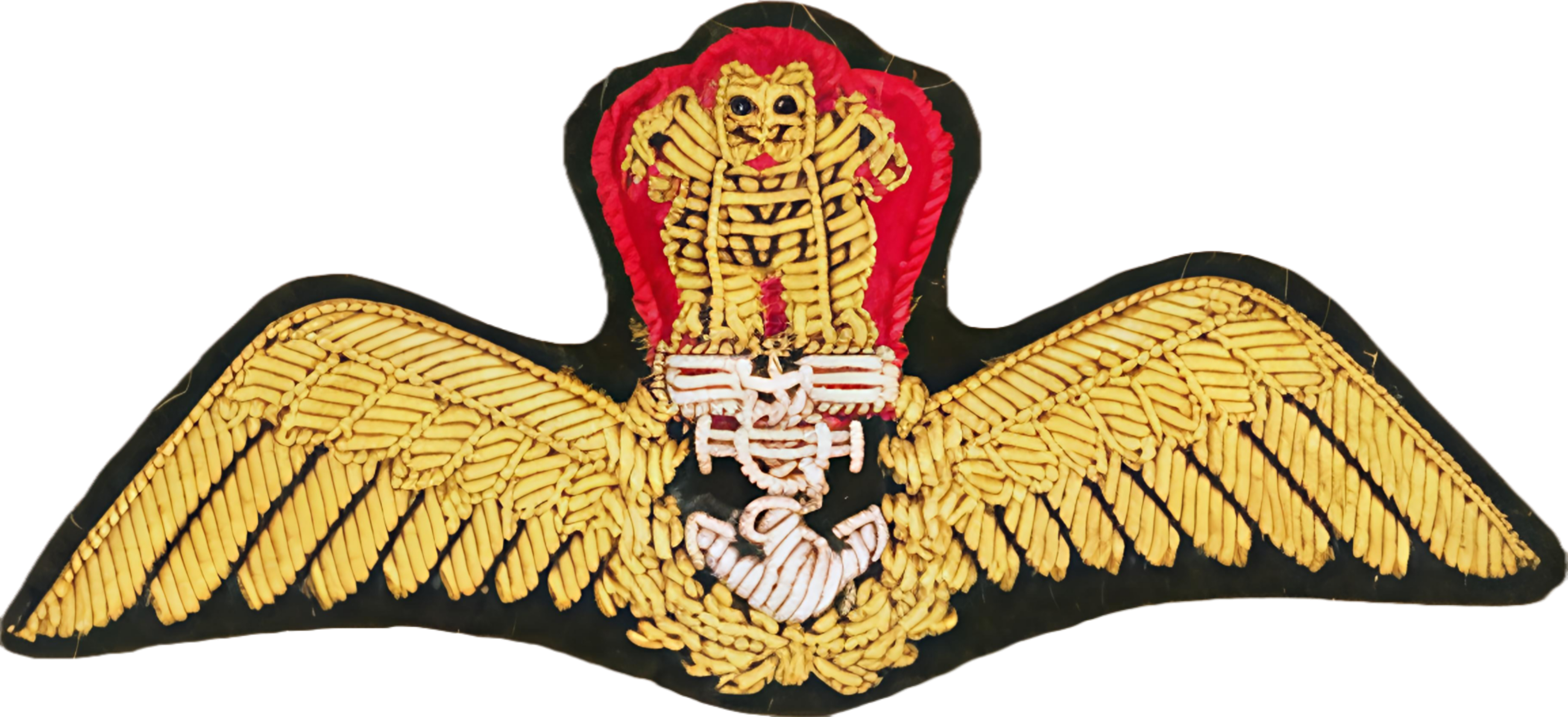

Naval aviator (Pilot) badge
Param Vishisht Seva Medal	Ati Vishisht Seva Medal	Samar Seva Star	Poorvi Star
Paschimi Star	Operation Vijay Star	Special Service Medal	Sangram Medal
Operation Vijay Medal	Videsh Seva Medal	50th Independence Anniversary Medal	25th Independence Anniversary Medal
30 Years Long Service Medal	20 Years Long Service Medal		9 Years Long Service Medal

== See also ==
- Chief of Naval Staff of the Indian Navy

Military offices
Preceded by Joginder Jaswant Singh	Chairman of the Chiefs of Staff Committee; 2007- 31 August 2009	Succeeded by Deepak Kapoor
Preceded by Arun Prakash	Chief of the Naval Staff; 2006–2009	Succeeded by Nirmal Kumar Verma
Preceded by O P Bansal	Flag Officer Commanding-in-Chief Eastern Naval Command; 2005-2006	Succeeded by A K Singh
Preceded by O. P. Bansal	Director General of the Indian Coast Guard; 2003 - 2004	Succeeded by A. K. Singh
Preceded by Madanjit Singh	Chief of Personnel; 2002-2003	Succeeded by Yashwant Prasad
Preceded by Yashwant Prasad	Flag Officer Commanding Western Fleet; 1998-2000	Succeeded by S S Byce
Preceded by Vinod Pasricha	Flag Officer Commanding Goa Naval Area & Flag Officer Naval Aviation; 1995 - 1997	Succeeded by K. V. Bharathan
