= Chiefs of Staff Committee (India) =

Triumvirate staff organization in the Indian Armed Forces

- Crest of the Chairman-Chiefs of Staff Committee.
- Founded: 15 August 1947
- Country: India
- Type: Military staff
- Part of: Indian Armed Forces
- Headquarters: Ministry of Defence, New Delhi, India
- Website: www.india.gov.in

Commanders
- Chairman: General N. S. Raja Subramani, PVSM AVSM SM VSM

Insignia
- Abbreviation: COSC

The Chiefs of Staff Committee (COSC) is an administrative forum of the senior-most military leaders of the Indian Armed Forces, which advises the Government of India on all military and strategic matters deemed privy to military coordination, direction and policy between the country's three armed services. By organization, the COSC is comprised several key members, namely, Chief of Defence Staff - who acts as the Committee's Permanent Chairman, along with the Chief of the Army Staff, the Chief of the Naval Staff and the Chief of the Air Staff - all of whom are also additionally supported by the Chief of Integrated Defence Staff.

By function, the COSC has two principal responsibilities: one, to inculcate and implement jointness through integration of, inter alia, the doctrine, logistics, and operations of the three armed services; two, to apprise to the nation's civilian leadership i.e., the Prime Minister and Minister of Defence, on all matters related to the nation's security. As such, it exists primarily as an advisory body, endowed with no executive command authority.

To execute its mandate, the COSC is closely supported by the Integrated Defence Staff (IDS) and other inter-service bodies under its patronage that specialize in facets such as intelligence, personnel, operations and training. Comparably, the forum is identical to the United Kingdom's Chiefs of Staff Committee and Pakistan's Joint Chiefs of Staff Committee.

From 1947 to 2019, and briefly from 2021 to 2022 - the leadership of the COSC was rotated amongst the service chiefs (or Chiefs of Staff) of the three armed services, with the senior-most chief serving as Chairman-COSC with no fixed tenure; however, since 2020, the mantle of the COSC's chairmanship is held by the Chief of the Defence Staff, a separate office that functions independent of the service chiefs.

== Functioning ==
The current membership of the Chiefs of Staff Committee:

Office	Photograph	Incumbent	Incumbent since	Service	Command Flag
Chief of Defence Staff (Permanent Chairman)		General; N. S. Raja Subramani; PVSM AVSM SM VSM	31 May 2026	Indian Army	
Chief of the Army Staff		General; Dhiraj Seth; PVSM UYSM AVSM	30 June 2026	Indian Army	
Chief of the Air Staff		Air Chief Marshal; Ashutosh Dixit; PVSM AVSM VM VSM	31 October 2026	Indian Air Force	
Chief of the Naval Staff		Admiral; Krishna Swaminathan; PVSM AVSM NM	31 May 2026	Indian Navy	
Chief of Integrated Defence Staff (Non-voting member)		Air Marshal; Tejinder Singh; PVSM AVSM VM	1 July 2026	Indian Air Force	

=== Chief of Defence Staff ===
The Chief of Defence Staff (CDS) is the principal military authority and senior-most appointment of the Indian Armed Forces. Introduced in 2019, the CDS operates on a status of primus inter pares i.e., first among equals with the Chiefs of Staff and functions as the COSC's Permanent Chairman, independent of the Chiefs of Staff.

As Permanent Chairman-COSC, the CDS maintains the following responsibilities within the forum:

- Acting as the principal military advisor to the Minister of Defence on all affairs related to inter-service integration, coherence and functioning.
- Participating as a member of the Defence Acquisition Council chaired by Minister of Defence and Defence Planning Committee chaired by National Security Advisor.
- Exercising command authority over specific inter-service organizations/agencies/commands, namely, the Defence Cyber Agency (DCyA), the Defence Space Agency and the Armed Forces Special Operations Division vis-à-vis the Integrated Defence Staff (IDS).
- Functioning as the Military Adviser to the Nuclear Command Authority.

=== Chiefs of Staff ===
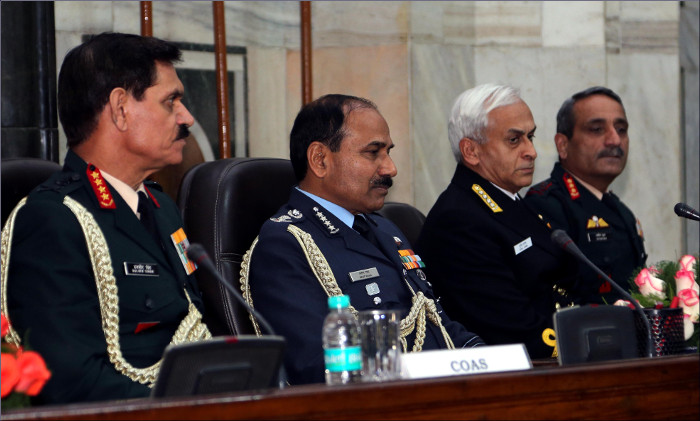
From left to right: the Chiefs of Staff of the Army, the Navy, the Air Force and the Chief of Integrated Defence Staff, in 2016.

The service chiefs (also referred to as the Chiefs of Staff) of the three services are, namely, the Chief of the Army Staff (COAS), the Chief of the Naval Staff (CNS) and Chief of the Air Staff (CAS) - all of whom are customarily four-star officers.

As voting members of the COSC, the Chiefs of Staff function in the undermentioned manner:

- Functioning with the dual role of leadership as the service's statutory chief of staff and activity as its ex-officio commander i.e., in the former role, overseeing the staff-cum-administrative duties of the services; in the latter role, overseeing the service's operational duties.
- Advising the COSC and the civilian leadership on matters privy to their respective services; this is in contrast to the CDS, whose advice reflects a comprehensive nature involving multiple, rather than concerned inputs.
- Deliberating inter-service issues to foster joint-realization of the country's national security objectives.

However, their mandate of the Chiefs of Staff are not formally defined by statute, and are obfuscated by the undermentioned:

- The Organisation, Functions, Powers and Procedure of Defence Headquarters, 1952 defines the Service Headquarters (SHQ) i.e., the administrative centers of the three services as attached offices, which by statute, excludes them from the departmental structure of the Ministry of Defence (MoD).
- The (Allocation of Business) Rules, 1961, which defines the authority, responsibility and obligations of government departments, prescribes that the responsibility for the defence of India thereof is placed with the Defence Secretary; there is no mention of the Chiefs of Staffs or their respective SHQs.

=== Chief of Integrated Defence Staff ===
In addition to its aforementioned core members, the COSC's functioning is supported by the Integrated Defence Staff (IDS), which functions as the COSC's principal arm and secretariat. The IDS, which by role also acts as an inter-service interface for coordinating the armed services, is led by the Chief of Integrated Defence Staff (CISC) - a three-star officer, who is a non-voting member of the COSC. Functionally, the CISC operates with the unofficial role of vice-CDS, to act as an adjudicator towards fostering inter-service coordination between the Service Headquarters (SHQ) of the three services.

To support the Chairman-COSC, the CISC undertakes the following roles:

- Chair the Defence Crisis Management Group.
- Supervise the co-ordination of Long Range Plans, Five Years Plans and annual budgetary proposals for the three services and presenting coordinated set of proposals to Minister of Defence after discussion with Chiefs of Staff in COSC and Defence Secretary.
- Coordinating and analyzing critical deficiencies in force capabilities, assessing the impact of such deficiencies on national military objectives.

== History ==
=== Creation (1947) ===
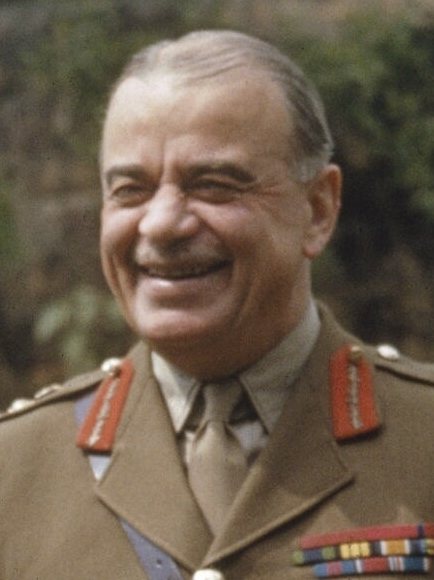
Lord Ismay, the principal architect of the COSC.

Before India's attainment of independence in 1947, the military organization in the then-British Raj had been constituted as a theatre of operations, wherein the policymaking for the colony's defence affairs emanated from the Committee of Imperial Defence (CID), which oversaw the formulation of military strategy for the overall British Empire. Following the dissolution of the Raj, India's inaugural Governor-General, Lord Mountbatten, sought to establish an administrative structure for the management of the armed forces of the new country. Consequently, Mountbatten selected his chief of staff, Lord Ismay, to execute the task.

Ismay, in his own stead, had spent a significant portion of his military career as a staff officer: he had served in the CID in a secretarial role during the 1920s-1930s with the responsibility of military planning, and had later served on the British Chiefs of Staff Committee during the Second World War; these postings thus allowed him to gain rich expertise in defence administration and subsequently, Mountbatten's choice.

As such, Ismay formulated a practical model for India's higher defence management, comprising a three-tier higher defence organization:

- Defence Committee of the Cabinet (DCC), chaired by the Prime Minister.
- Defence Minister's Committee (DMC), chaired by the Defence Minister.
- Chiefs of Staff Committee (COSC), as part of the Military Wing of the Cabinet Secretariat.

The COSC, which formed the third-tier of Ismay's formula, consisted of three Chiefs of Staff, who would serve as professional advisors to the civilian government wherein their mandate was to render guidance on military planning and operational matters. The COSC, which would come to be a part of the Military Wing of the Cabinet Secretariat, was thus to be led by the Chiefs of Staff on a rotational basis, with the senior-most Chief serving as Chairman-COSC.

Additionally, Ismay formulated a series of several sub-committees that would address the functioning of the COSC and coordination between the three services, staff both by civil servants and uniformed officers; some of them were:

- Joint Operation Committee (JOCOM).
- Joint Intelligence Committee (JIC).
- Joint Training Committee (JTC).
- Joint Planning Committee (JPC).

== Chairmen ==
† Died in office.

No.	Portrait	Chairman Chiefs of Staff Committee	Took office	Left office	Time in office	Defence branch	Ref.
1	Sir Robert Mcgregor Macdonald LockhartKCB CIE MC	General; Sir Robert Mcgregor Macdonald Lockhart; KCB CIE MC (1893–1981)	15 August 1947	31 December 1947	138 days	Indian Army	
2	Sir Thomas ElmhirstKBE, CB, AFC, DL	Air Marshal; Sir Thomas Elmhirst; KBE, CB, AFC, DL (1895–1982)	31 December 1947	22 February 1950	2 years, 53 days	Royal Indian Air Force; Indian Air Force	
3	Sir William Edward ParryKCB	Admiral; Sir William Edward Parry; KCB (1893–1970)	22 February 1950	13 October 1951	1 year, 233 days	Indian Navy	
4	Kodandera Madappa CariappaOBE	Field Marshal; Kodandera Madappa Cariappa; OBE (1899–1993)	14 October 1951	14 January 1953	1 year, 92 days	Indian Army	
5	Sir Charles Thomas Mark PizeyKBE CB DSO*	Admiral; Sir Charles Thomas Mark Pizey; KBE CB DSO* (1899–1993)	14 January 1953	22 July 1955	2 years, 189 days	Indian Navy	
6	Subroto MukerjeeOBE	Air Marshal; Subroto Mukerjee; OBE (1911–1960)	22 July 1955	8 November 1960†	5 years, 109 days	Indian Air Force	
7	Kodandera Subayya ThimayyaDSO	General; Kodandera Subayya Thimayya; DSO (1906–1965)	9 November 1960	7 May 1961	179 days	Indian Army	
8	Ram Dass Katari	Vice Admiral; Ram Dass Katari (1911–1983)	7 May 1961	4 June 1962	1 year, 28 days	Indian Navy	
9	Aspy Marwan EngineerDFC	Air Marshal; Aspy Marwan Engineer; DFC (1912–2002)	4 June 1962	24 July 1964	2 years, 50 days	Indian Air Force	
10	Bhaskar Sadashiv Soman	Vice Admiral; Bhaskar Sadashiv Soman (1913–1995)	24 July 1964	3 March 1966	1 year, 222 days	Indian Navy	
11	Jayanto Nath ChaudhuriOBE	General; Jayanto Nath Chaudhuri; OBE (1908–1983)	3 March 1966	7 June 1966	96 days	Indian Army	
12	Arjan SinghDFC	Marshal of the Indian Air Force; Arjan Singh; DFC (1919–2017)	8 June 1966	15 July 1969	3 years, 37 days	Indian Air Force	
13	Adhar Kumar ChatterjiPVSM	Admiral; Adhar Kumar Chatterji; PVSM (1914–2001)	15 July 1969	24 February 1970	224 days	Indian Navy	
14	Sam Hormusji Framji Jamshedji ManekshawMC	Field Marshal; Sam Hormusji Framji Jamshedji Manekshaw; MC (1914–2008)	24 February 1970	15 January 1973	2 years, 326 days	Indian Army	
15	Gopal Gurunath BewoorPVSM	General; Gopal Gurunath Bewoor; PVSM (1916–1989)	15 January 1973	31 May 1975	2 years, 136 days	Indian Army	
16	Om Prakash MehraPVSM	Air Chief Marshal; Om Prakash Mehra; PVSM (1919–2015)	31 May 1975	31 January 1976	245 days	Indian Air Force	
17	Sourendra Nath KohliPVSM	Admiral; Sourendra Nath Kohli; PVSM (1916–2007)	31 January 1976	29 February 1976	2 years, 326 days	Indian Navy	
18	Tapishwar Narain RainaMVC	General; Tapishwar Narain Raina; MVC (1921–1980)	29 February 1976	31 May 1978	2 years, 92 days	Indian Army	
19	Hrushikesh MoolgavkarPVSM, MVC	Air Chief Marshal; Hrushikesh Moolgavkar; PVSM, MVC (1920–2015)	1 June 1978	30 August 1978	90 days	Indian Air Force	
20	Jal CursetjiPVSM	Admiral; Jal Cursetji; PVSM (1919–1991)	30 August 1978	1 March 1979	183 days	Indian Navy	.
21	Om Prakash MalhotraPVSM	General; Om Prakash Malhotra; PVSM (1922–2015)	1 March 1979	31 May 1981	2 years, 91 days	Indian Army	
22	Idris Hasan LatifPVSM	Air Chief Marshal; Idris Hasan Latif; PVSM (1923–2018)	1 June 1981	30 August 1981	90 days	Indian Air Force	
23	Ronald Lynsdale PereiraPVSM, AVSM	Admiral; Ronald Lynsdale Pereira; PVSM, AVSM (1923–1993)	1 September 1981	26 February 1982	178 days	Indian Navy	
24	Kotikalapudi Venkata Krishna RaoPVSM	General; Kotikalapudi Venkata Krishna Rao; PVSM (1923–2016)	1 March 1982	31 July 1983	1 year, 152 days	Indian Army	
25	Dilbagh SinghPVSM, AVSM, VM	Air Chief Marshal; Dilbagh Singh; PVSM, AVSM, VM (1926–2001)	1 August 1983	5 September 1984	1 year, 35 days	Indian Air Force	
26	Oscar Stanley DawsonPVSM, AVSM	Admiral; Oscar Stanley Dawson; PVSM, AVSM (1923–2011)	5 September 1984	30 November 1984	86 days	Indian Navy	
27	Arun Shridhar VaidyaPVSM, MVC & Bar, AVSM	General; Arun Shridhar Vaidya; PVSM, MVC & Bar, AVSM (1926–1986)	1 December 1984	31 January 1986	1 year, 61 days	Indian Army	
28	Radhakrishna Hariram TahilianiPVSM, AVSM	Admiral; Radhakrishna Hariram Tahiliani; PVSM, AVSM (1930–2015)	1 February 1986	30 November 1987	1 year, 302 days	Indian Navy	
29	Denis La FontainePVSM, AVSM, VSM	Air Chief Marshal; Denis La Fontaine; PVSM, AVSM, VSM (1929–2011)	1 December 1987	31 July 1988	182 days	Indian Air Force	
30	Jayant Ganpat NadkarniPVSM, AVSM, NM, VSM	Admiral; Jayant Ganpat Nadkarni; PVSM, AVSM, NM, VSM (1931–2018)	1 August 1988	30 November 1990	2 years, 121 days	Indian Navy	
31	Surinder MehraPVSM, AVSM, VM	Air Chief Marshal; Surinder Mehra; PVSM, AVSM, VM (1932–2003)	1 December 1990	31 July 1991	242 days	Indian Air Force	
32	Sunith Francis RodriguesPVSM, VSM	General; Sunith Francis Rodrigues; PVSM, VSM (1933–2022)	1 August 1991	30 June 1993	1 year, 333 days	Indian Army	
33	Laxminarayan RamdasPVSM, AVSM, VrC, VSM	Admiral; Laxminarayan Ramdas; PVSM, AVSM, VrC, VSM (1933–2024)	30 June 1993	30 September 1993	92 days	Indian Navy	
34	Bipin Chandra JoshiPVSM, AVSM	General; Bipin Chandra Joshi; PVSM, AVSM (1935–1994)	1 October 1993	18 November 1994†	1 year, 48 days	Indian Army	.
35	Swaroop Krishna KaulPVSM, MVC	Air Chief Marshal; Swaroop Krishna Kaul; PVSM, MVC (1935–2025)	20 November 1994	31 December 1995	1 year, 41 days	Indian Air Force	
36	Vijai Singh ShekhawatPVSM, AVSM, VrC	Admiral; Vijai Singh Shekhawat; PVSM, AVSM, VrC (born 1936)	31 December 1995	30 September 1996	274 days	Indian Navy	
37	Shankar RoychowdhuryPVSM	General; Shankar Roychowdhury; PVSM (born 1937)	1 October 1996	30 September 1997	364 days	Indian Army	
38	Satish SareenPVSM, AVSM, VM	Air Chief Marshal; Satish Sareen; PVSM, AVSM, VM (born 1939)	1 October 1997	31 December 1998	1 year, 91 days	Indian Air Force	
39	Ved Prakash MalikPVSM, AVSM	General; Ved Prakash Malik; PVSM, AVSM (born 1939)	1 January 1999	30 September 2000	1 year, 273 days	Indian Army	
40	Sushil KumarPVSM, UYSM, AVSM, NM	Admiral; Sushil Kumar; PVSM, UYSM, AVSM, NM (1940–2019)	1 October 2000	29 December 2001	1 year, 89 days	Indian Navy	
41	Sundararajan PadmanabhanPVSM, AVSM, VSM	General; Sundararajan Padmanabhan; PVSM, AVSM, VSM (1940–2024)	30 December 2001	31 December 2002	1 year, 1 day	Indian Army	
42	Madhvendra SinghPVSM, AVSM	Admiral; Madhvendra Singh; PVSM, AVSM	31 December 2002	31 July 2004	1 year, 213 days	Indian Navy	
43	Srinivasapuram KrishnaswamyPVSM, AVSM, VM**	Air Chief Marshal; Srinivasapuram Krishnaswamy; PVSM, AVSM, VM** (born 1943)	31 July 2004	29 December 2004	151 days	Indian Air Force	
44	Nirmal Chander VijPVSM, UYSM, AVSM	General; Nirmal Chander Vij; PVSM, UYSM, AVSM (born 1943)	30 December 2004	30 January 2005	31 days	Indian Army	
45	Arun PrakashPVSM, AVSM, VrC, VSM	Admiral; Arun Prakash; PVSM, AVSM, VrC, VSM (born 1944)	31 January 2005	31 October 2006	1 year, 273 days	Indian Navy	
46	Shashindra Pal TyagiPVSM, AVSM, VM	Air Chief Marshal; Shashindra Pal Tyagi; PVSM, AVSM, VM (born 1945)	31 October 2006	31 March 2007	151 days	Indian Air Force	.
47	Joginder Jaswant SinghPVSM, AVSM, VSM	General; Joginder Jaswant Singh; PVSM, AVSM, VSM (born 1945)	31 March 2007	30 September 2007	183 days	Indian Army	.
48	Sureesh MehtaPVSM, AVSM	Admiral; Sureesh Mehta; PVSM, AVSM (born 1947)	30 September 2007	31 August 2009	1 year, 335 days	Indian Navy	.
49	Deepak KapoorPVSM, AVSM, SM, VSM	General; Deepak Kapoor; PVSM, AVSM, SM, VSM (born 1948)	31 August 2009	31 March 2010	212 days	Indian Army	.
50	Pradeep Vasant NaikPVSM, VSM	Air Chief Marshal; Pradeep Vasant Naik; PVSM, VSM (born 1949)	31 March 2010	30 July 2011	1 year, 121 days	Indian Air Force	
51	Nirmal Kumar VermaPVSM, AVSM	Admiral; Nirmal Kumar Verma; PVSM, AVSM (born 1949)	30 July 2011	31 August 2012	1 year, 32 days	Indian Navy	
52	Norman Anil Kumar BrownePVSM, AVSM, VM	Air Chief Marshal; Norman Anil Kumar Browne; PVSM, AVSM, VM (born 1951)	31 August 2012	31 December 2013	1 year, 122 days	Indian Air Force	.
53	Bikram SinghPVSM, UYSM, AVSM, SM, VSM	General; Bikram Singh; PVSM, UYSM, AVSM, SM, VSM (born 1951)	31 December 2013	31 July 2014	212 days	Indian Army	
54	Arup RahaPVSM, AVSM, VM	Air Chief Marshal; Arup Raha; PVSM, AVSM, VM (born 1954)	31 July 2014	31 December 2016	2 years, 153 days	Indian Air Force	.
55	Sunil LanbaPVSM, AVSM	Admiral; Sunil Lanba; PVSM, AVSM (born 1957)	31 December 2016	31 May 2019	2 years, 151 days	Indian Navy	
56	Birender Singh DhanoaPVSM, AVSM, YSM, VM	Air Chief Marshal; Birender Singh Dhanoa; PVSM, AVSM, YSM, VM (born 1957)	31 May 2019	27 September 2019	119 days	Indian Air Force	
57	Bipin RawatPVSM, UYSM, AVSM, YSM, SM, VSM	General; Bipin Rawat; PVSM, UYSM, AVSM, YSM, SM, VSM (1958–2021)	27 September 2019 (Note: Held temporarily until creation of post of Chief of the Defense Staff (CDS) on 1 January 2020, when Chairman COSC made permanent in tandem with CDS post.)	8 December 2021†	2 years, 72 days	Indian Army	
Vacant 8–15 December 2021
–	Manoj Mukund NaravanePVSM, AVSM, SM, VSM, ADC	General; Manoj Mukund Naravane; PVSM, AVSM, SM, VSM, ADC (born 1960); Acting	15 December 2021	30 April 2022	136 days	Indian Army	
Vacant 30 April 2022 – 30 September 2022
58	Anil ChauhanPVSM, UYSM, AVSM, SM, VSM	General; Anil Chauhan; PVSM, UYSM, AVSM, SM, VSM (born 1961)	30 September 2022	30 May 2026	3 years, 242 days	Indian Army	
59	N. S. Raja SubramaniPVSM, AVSM, SM, VSM	General; N. S. Raja Subramani; PVSM, AVSM, SM, VSM (born 1965)	31 May 2026	Incumbent	153 days	Indian Army	

== See also ==
=== Inter-service offices ===
- Chief of the Defence Staff
- Chief of Integrated Defence Staff

=== Other offices of the Indian Armed Forces ===
- Chief of the Army Staff
- Chief of the Naval Staff
- Chief of the Air Staff

=== International equivalents ===
- Pakistan: Joint Chiefs of Staff Committee (JCSC)
- United Kingdom: Chiefs of Staff Committee (CSC)
- United States: Joint Chiefs of Staff (JSC)
