= Lakshman Madhav Katre =

Indian aviator and air marshal

Air Chief Marshal Lakshman Madhav Katre PVSM, AVSM **
- Born: 26 January 1927; Madras
- Died: 1 July 1985 (aged 58); Dehradun, Uttarakhand, India
- Military career
- Allegiance: British India (1946–1947); India (from 1947)
- Branch: Royal Indian Air Force; Indian Air Force
- Service years: 1946–1985
- Rank: Air Chief Marshal
- Awards: Param Vishist Seva Medal; Ati Vishist Seva Medal

12th Chief of the Air Staff
- In office 4 September 1984 – 1 July 1985
- Preceded by: Dilbagh Singh
- Succeeded by: Denis La Fontaine

Lakshman Madhav Katre (1927–1985) was the head of the Indian Air Force (IAF) from 1984 to 1985, as Chief of the Air Staff and the second IAF Chief of Staff to die in office. He was awarded the Param Vishisht Seva Medal and Ati Vishisht Seva Medal and Bar.

He hailed from the Konkani community and completed his schooling from The Doon School, Dehradun, India. He joined the Royal Indian Air Force on 3 Aug 1944.

In 1983 he was the Chairman of Hindustan Aeronautics Limited.

He died suddenly on 1 July 1985.

== Military honours and awards ==

Param Vishisht Seva Medal	Ati Vishisht Seva Medal		General Service Medal
Samar Seva Star	Paschimi Star	Raksha Medal	Sangram Medal
Sainya Seva Medal	Videsh Seva Medal	Indian Independence Medal	25th Anniversary of Independence Medal
30 Years Long Service Medal	20 Years Long Service Medal	9 Years Long Service Medal	War Medal 1939–1945

Military offices
Preceded by Dilbagh Singh	Chief of the Air Staff (India); 1984–1985	Succeeded by Denis La Fontaine
Preceded by J. D. Aquino	Commandant of the Air Force Academy; 1972 - 1975	Succeeded by H. R. Chitnis
