= Arup Raha =

Former chief of the Indian Air Force

Air Chief Marshal (Retd.) Arup Raha PVSM, AVSM, VM, ADC
- অরূপ রাহা
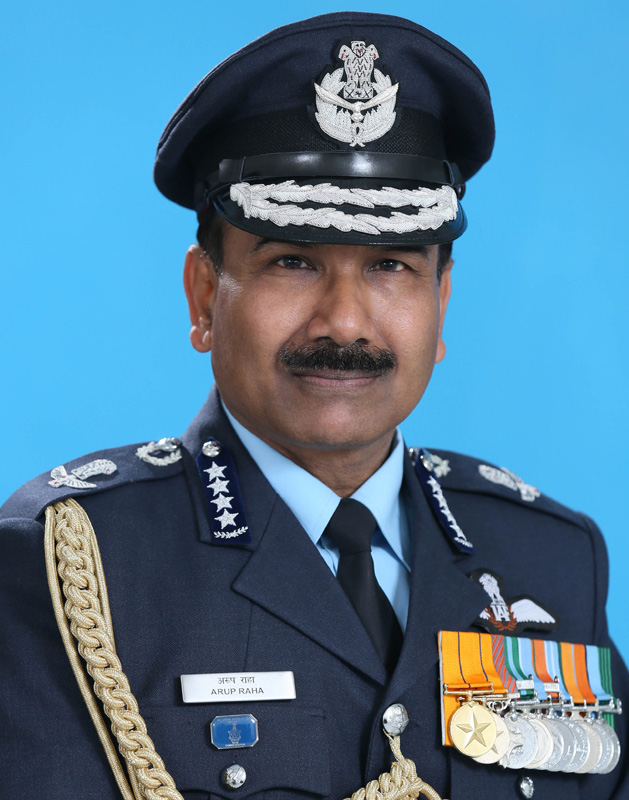
- Official portrait, 2014

54th Chairman of the Chiefs of Staff Committee
- In office 31 July 2014 – 31 December 2016
- President: Pranab Mukherjee
- Preceded by: Bikram Singh
- Succeeded by: Sunil Lanba

21st Chief of Air Staff
- In office 31 December 2013 – 31 December 2016
- President: Pranab Mukherjee
- Preceded by: Norman Anil Kumar Browne
- Succeeded by: Birender Singh Dhanoa

37th Vice Chief of Air Staff
- In office 1 July 2013 – 31 December 2013
- President: Pranab Mukherjee
- Preceded by: Dinesh Chandra Kumaria
- Succeeded by: Ravi Kant Sharma

Personal details
- Born: 26 December 1954 (age 71) Baidyabati, West Bengal, India
- Spouse: Lily Raha
- Children: Atanu Raha, Anusree Raha

Military service
- Allegiance: India
- Branch/service: Indian Air Force
- Years of service: 1975–2016
- Rank: Air Chief Marshal
- Commands: Western Air Command; Central Air Command; AFS Bathinda; AFS Adampur; 47 Squadron IAF
- Battles/wars: Kargil War
- Awards: Param Vishisht Seva Medal; Ati Vishisht Seva Medal; Vayu Sena Medal

Arup Raha, PVSM, AVSM, VM, ADC, (Bengali: অরূপ রাহা) is an Indian Air Force veteran and was the 21st Chief of the Air Staff of the Indian Air Force and served from 31 December 2013 to 31 December 2016. He was also the Chairman of the Chiefs of Staff Committee, a post occupied by India's senior-most military officer, who advises the government and ensures jointsmanship in the armed forces. Currently, he is the Chancellor of Assam University.

== Early life and education ==
Raha was born in a Bengali Kayastha family on 26 December 1954 in the city of Baidyabati, West Bengal. His father was a doctor. He was educated at Sainik School Purulia (1970 batch).

== Military training ==
Raha was trained at the National Defence Academy, Khadakwasla, India, from July 1970 to June 1973, and at the time of graduating from NDA in June 1973, he was awarded the gold medal for being the best cadet of the 44th NDA course. Subsequently, he did flying training on HT-2 and Kiran ( HJT-16 ) at the Air Force Academy, Hyderabad, before being commissioned into the Indian Air Force as a fighter pilot in Dec 1974. After flying Hunters in Operational Conversion Unit, he went on to fly Mig -21 aircraft.

== Military career ==
Raha has flown a wide variety of combat and trainer aircraft. After initial training on the HAL HT-2, he has flown the MIG-21 and MIG-29 aircraft and has commanded a MiG-29 fighter squadron and two frontline airbases along India's Western front. As on 2 April 2010, he had 3,400 hours of flying experience. Raha previously served as the Vice Chief of the Air Staff of the Indian Air Force and as the Air Officer Commanding-in-Chief (AOC-in-C) of the Western Air Command, and that of the Central Air Command. He has also served as the Senior Air Staff Officer at Headquarters, Western Air Command and Deputy Commandant at Air Force Academy, Hyderabad.

Raha has held many important staff appointments in India and abroad.

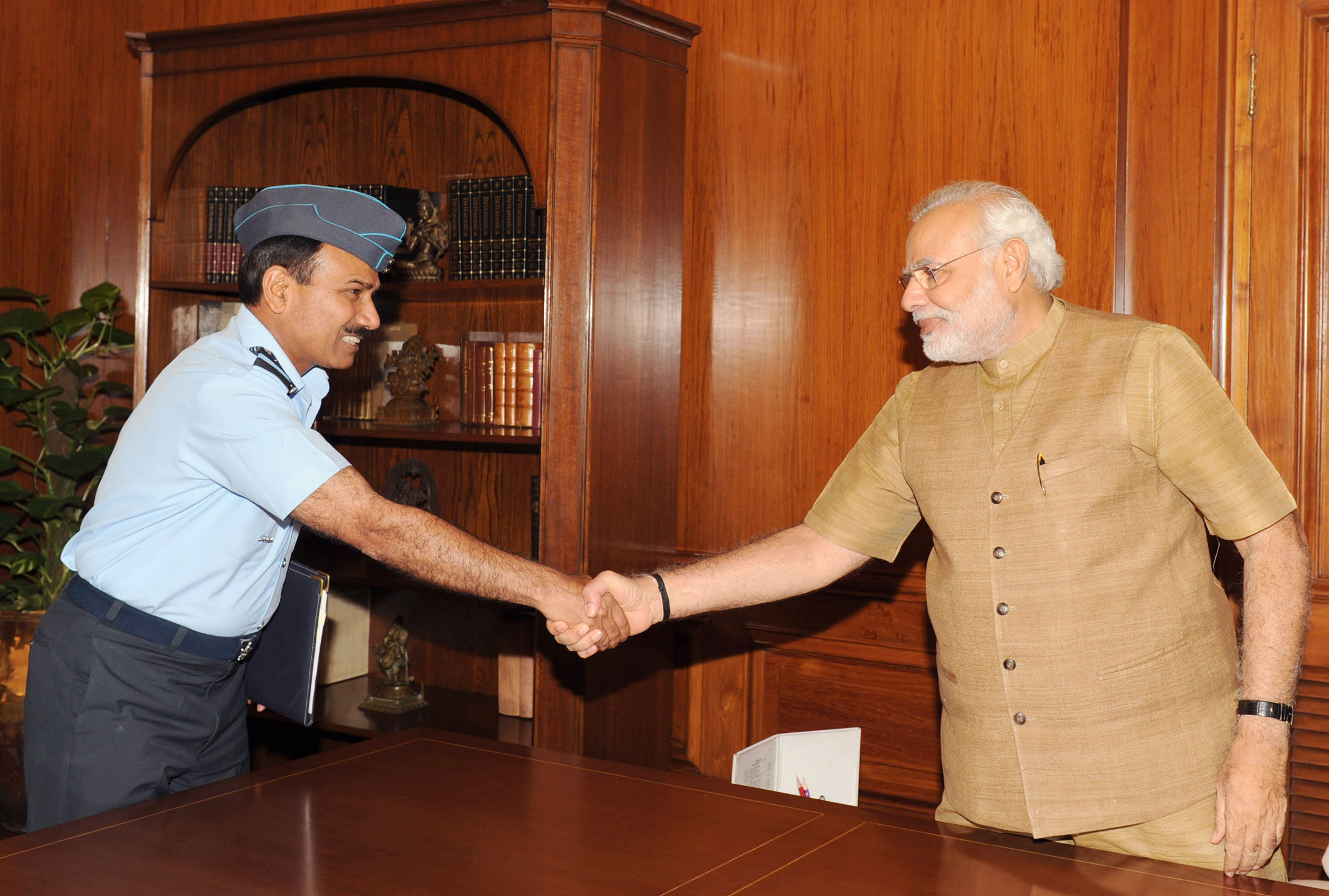
Air Chief calls on PM Narendra Modi

=== Notable appointments held ===
Name of Appointment	Rank	Insignia	Period
Chief of Air Staff	Air Chief Marshal		31 December 2013 to 31 December 2016
Vice Chief of Air Staff	Air Marshal		1 July 2013 to 31 Dec 2013
Air Officer Commanding-in-Chief of the Western Air Command of the IAF	Air Marshal		1 June 2012 to 30 June 2013
Air Officer Commanding-in-Chief of the Central Air Command of the IAF	Air Marshal		2 Nov 2011 to 31 May 2012
Senior Air Staff Officer at Western Air Command	Air Vice Marshal		till 1 Nov 2011
Directing Staff at Flying Instructors School, Tambaram	Air Commodore		Unknown
Commanding Officer of No: 47 Squadron IAF Black Archers	Wing Commander		8 June 1992 to 5 June 1994

== Personal life ==
Arup Raha is married to Lily Raha and they have two children. The son, Atanu, is a commercial pilot who is married to Sanskriti Chatterjee Raha, a professional Kathakali dancer. The daughter, Anusree Raha, is an Indian Economic Service officer and a TEDx speaker, and is married to Bodhisattwa Biswas, an alumnus of Indian School of Business.

== Awards and decorations ==

Param Vishisht Seva Medal	Ati Vishisht Seva Medal		Vayu Sena Medal
Samanya Seva Medal	Operation Parakram Medal	Sainya Seva Medal	Videsh Seva Medal
50th Anniversary of Independence Medal	30 Years Long Service Medal	20 Years Long Service Medal	9 Years Long Service Medal

In 2018, the state-run Sidho Kanho Birsha University awarded Arup Raha with an honorary D.Litt. degree during its convocation ceremony.

Military offices
Preceded by Bikram Singh	Chairman of the Chiefs of Staff Committee; 31 July 2014 – 31 December 2016	Succeeded by Sunil Lanba
Preceded by Norman Anil Kumar Browne	Chief of the Air Staff (India); 31 December 2013 – 31 December 2016	Succeeded by Birender Singh Dhanoa
Preceded by Norman Anil Kumar Browne	Vice Chief of the Air Staff (India); 1 July 2013 – 31 December 2013	Succeeded by Ravi Kant Sharma
