= Dilbagh Singh =

Indian air marshal

Air Chief Marshal Dilbagh Singh PVSM, AVSM, VM

12th Indian Ambassador to Brazil
- In office August 1985 – August 1987
- Appointed by: President of India (then, Zail Singh)
- Preceded by: S.S. Nath
- Succeeded by: A.R. Kakodar

25th Chairman of the Chiefs of Staff Committee
- In office 31 July 1983 – 3 September 1984
- President: Zail Singh
- Prime Minister: Indira Gandhi
- Preceded by: K. V. Krishna Rao
- Succeeded by: Oscar Stanley Dawson

11th Chief of the Air Staff
- In office 1 September 1981 – 3 September 1984
- President: Neelam Sanjiva Reddy; Zail Singh
- Prime Minister: Indira Gandhi
- Preceded by: Idris Hasan Latif
- Succeeded by: Lakshman Madhav Katre

Personal details
- Born: 10 March 1926 Gurdaspur District, Punjab
- Died: 9 February 2001 (aged 74) Dehradun, Uttarakhand, India

Military service
- Allegiance: British India (1945–1947); India (from 1947)
- Branch/service: Royal Indian Air Force (1945–1947); Indian Air Force (1947–1984)
- Years of service: 1945-1984
- Rank: Air Chief Marshal
- Unit: No. 1 Squadron
- Commands: Eastern Air Command; Ambala Air Force Station; 28 Squadron
- Battles/wars: World War II; Indo-Pakistani War of 1965; Indo-Pakistani War of 1971; Operation Lal Dora
- Award(s): Param Vishisht Seva Medal; Ati Vishisht Seva Medal; Vayu Sena Medal

Air Chief Marshal Dilbagh Singh, PVSM, AVSM, VM (10 March 1926 – 9 February 2001) was the head of the Indian Air Force from 1981 to 1984, as Chief of the Air Staff. He was the second Sikh to hold that position.

Dilbagh Singh was commissioned as a pilot in 1944. His operational flying career spanned the Spitfire to introducing the MiG-21 into service in India. He had earlier made the first official "supersonic bang" over India in New Delhi when the Mystere IV-A was showcased in a public demonstration.

He was India's ambassador to Brazil from 1985 to 1987. He was a student of pandit Buta Ram of Rahon. His visit to Rahon to visit his teacher when he was Air Marshal is still remembered. He inspired scores of youngsters from Rahon and Nawanshahar region to join defense forces

Military offices
Preceded by Idris Latif	Chief of the Air Staff (India); 1981–1984	Succeeded by Lakshman Katre
