= Norman Anil Kumar Browne =

Former chief of the Indian Air Force

Air Chief Marshal Norman Anil Kumar Browne PVSM, AVSM, VM, ADC
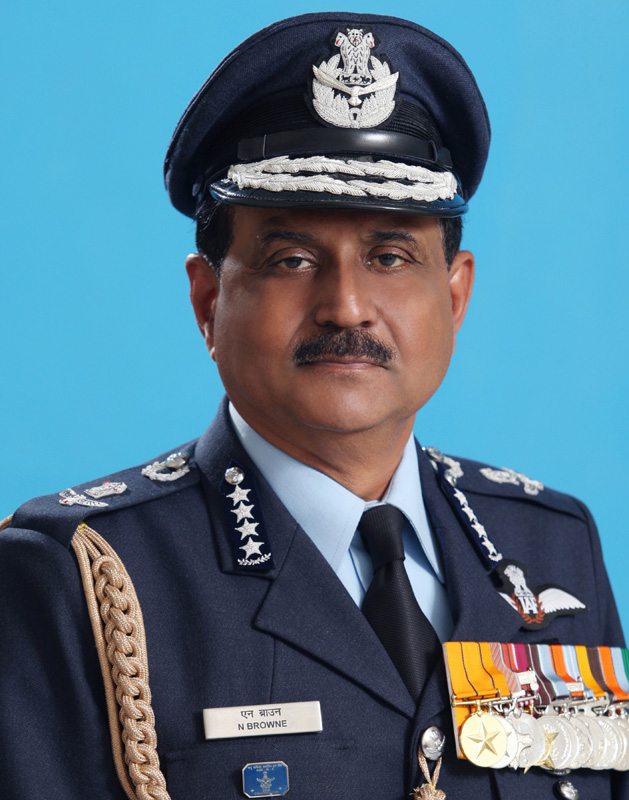
- Browne in 2011

Indian Ambassador to Norway
- In office 30 August 2014 – 30 April 2016
- President: Pranab Mukherjee
- Preceded by: Ranjan Mathai
- Succeeded by: Debraj Pradhan

52nd Chairman of the Chiefs of Staff Committee
- In office 31 August 2012 – 31 December 2013
- President: Pranab Mukherjee
- Preceded by: Nirmal Kumar Verma
- Succeeded by: Bikram Singh

20th Chief of the Air Staff
- In office 31 July 2011 – 31 December 2013
- President: Pratibha Patil; Pranab Mukherjee
- Preceded by: Pradeep Vasant Naik
- Succeeded by: Arup Raha

Personal details
- Born: 15 December 1951 (age 74) Prayagraj, Uttar Pradesh, India
- Spouse: Kiran Browne
- Children: Group Captain Omar Browne (son); Alisha Browne (daughter)
- Nickname: 'Charlie' Browne

Military service
- Allegiance: India
- Branch/service: Indian Air Force
- Years of service: 1972 - 2013
- Rank: Air Chief Marshal
- Commands: Western Air Command; AFS Lohegaon; 16 Squadron
- Service Number: 13129
- Awards: Param Vishist Seva Medal; Ati Vishist Seva Medal (AVSM); Vayu Sena Medal (VM)

Air Chief Marshal Norman Anil Kumar Browne, PVSM, AVSM, VM, ADC also known as "Charlie" Browne, is a former Chief of the Air Staff (CAS) of the Indian Air Force. He served in this position from 31 July 2011 to 31 Dec 2013. Browne served as India's Ambassador to Norway from August 2014 to April 2016.

== Personal life ==
Browne was brought up in Allahabad and did his schooling from St. Joseph's College, Allahabad. He is married to Mrs. Kiran Browne. Together, they have a son, Omar, who serves as a fighter pilot in the IAF; and a daughter, Alisha.

== Military career ==
Browne is an alumnus of the National Defence Academy and also trained with the United Kingdom's Royal Air Force on Jaguar aircraft before commanding a Jaguar squadron. A graduate of Air Command and Staff College, Maxwell Air Force Base, USA, he has held many appointments including Joint Director at Air War Strategy Cell at Air Headquarters, Chief Operations Officer and Air Officer Commanding of a Sukhoi Su-30 base, Air-I at Western Air Command and Assistant Chief of Air Staff (Intelligence) at Air Headquarters. Browne was commissioned into the fighter stream of the IAF on 24 June 1972.

As a fighter pilot, he has logged over 3,100 hours flying Hunters, Jaguars, MiG-21s and Su-30MKIs, and has served as an instructor at the Tactics and Combat Development Establishment (TACDE) and Defence Services Staff College (DSSC), Wellington.

Air Chief Marshal Browne became Vice Chief of the Air Staff until 31 July 2011, when he replaced outgoing Air Chief Marshal Pradeep Vasant Naik. Prior to taking over as the Vice Chief of the Air Staff in January 2011, he served as the AOC-in-C of Western Air Command. Upon the retirement of Admiral Nirmal Kumar Verma, Browne became the new Chairman of the Chiefs of Staff Committee. Browne was later replaced by Air Chief Marshal Arup Raha.

=== Awards ===

Param Vishisht Seva Medal		Ati Vishisht Seva Medal	
Vayusena Medal	General Service Medal 1947	Paschimi Star	Sangram Medal
Operation Parakram Medal	Sainya Seva Medal	Videsh Seva Medal	50th Anniversary of Independence Medal
25th Anniversary of Independence Medal	30 Years Long Service Medal	20 Years Long Service Medal	9 Years Long Service Medal

== Diplomatic career ==
Browne served as India's Ambassador to Norway from 30 August 2014 to April 2016.

Military offices
Preceded by Nirmal Kumar Verma	Chairman of the Chiefs of Staff Committee; September 2012 – December 2013	Succeeded by Bikram Singh
Preceded by Pradeep Vasant Naik	Chief of the Air Staff (India); July 2011 – December 2013	Succeeded by Arup Raha
