= Surinder Mehra =

Air Chief Marshal Surendra Kumar Mehra PVSM, AVSM, VM, ADC

14th Chief of Air Staff
- In office 1 August 1988 – 31 July 1991
- President: Ramaswamy Venkataraman
- Prime Minister: Rajiv Gandhi
- Preceded by: Denis La Fontaine
- Succeeded by: Nirmal Chandra Suri

Personal details
- Born: 15 November 1932 Delhi, India
- Died: 8 December 2003 (aged 74) Gurgaon, India
- Education: Modern School; Delhi University
- Awards: Ati Vishist Seva Medal (AVSM); Param Vishist Seva Medal (PVSM); Vayu Sena Medal (VM)
- Nickname: Polly

Military service
- Allegiance: India
- Branch/service: Indian Air Force
- Years of service: 1951–1991
- Rank: Air Chief Marshal; Service Number (4197)
- Commands: Chief of the Air Staff (India) (1988–1991); South Western Air Command; No.28 Squadron; No.106 Squadron
- Battles/wars: Indo-Pakistani War of 1965; Indo-Pakistani War of 1971; Operation Brasstacks

Air Chief Marshal Surinder Kumar Mehra (15 November 1932 – 8 December 2003), PVSM, AVSM, VM, was the Chief of Air Staff of Indian Air Force from 1 August 1988 until 31 July 1991. He was born in Delhi.

== Early life ==
He was born in Delhi on 15 November 1932, educated at the Modern School in New Delhi, and thereafter at the Delhi University.

== Career ==
He was commissioned in the Indian Air Force in December 1951 as a fighter pilot.

From 1973 to 1976 he went on to command the Tactics and Air Combat Development Establishment division, followed by posting as Air Attaché in the Indian Ambassador's Office in Russia. He was awarded AVSM in 1976. After being promoted to the rank of Air Commodore, he assumed command of Adampur and later Jamnagar Air Force stations.

In 1987, he was appointed Air Officer Commanding-in-Chief, South Western Air Command with the responsibility of all air operations in Rajasthan, Gujarat and Maharashtra. In 1988, he took over as the Chief of Air Staff. He retired in 1991. Air Chief Marshal Polly Mehra died on 8 December 2003.

Military offices
Preceded by Jayant Ganpat Nadkarni	Chairman of the Chiefs of Staff Committee; 1990–1991	Succeeded by Sunith Francis Rodrigues
Preceded by Denis La Fontaine	Chief of the Air Staff (India); 1988–1991	Succeeded by Nirmal Chandra Suri
