= Nirmal Kumar Verma =

Indian Naval Officer

Admiral Nirmal Kumar Verma PVSM, AVSM
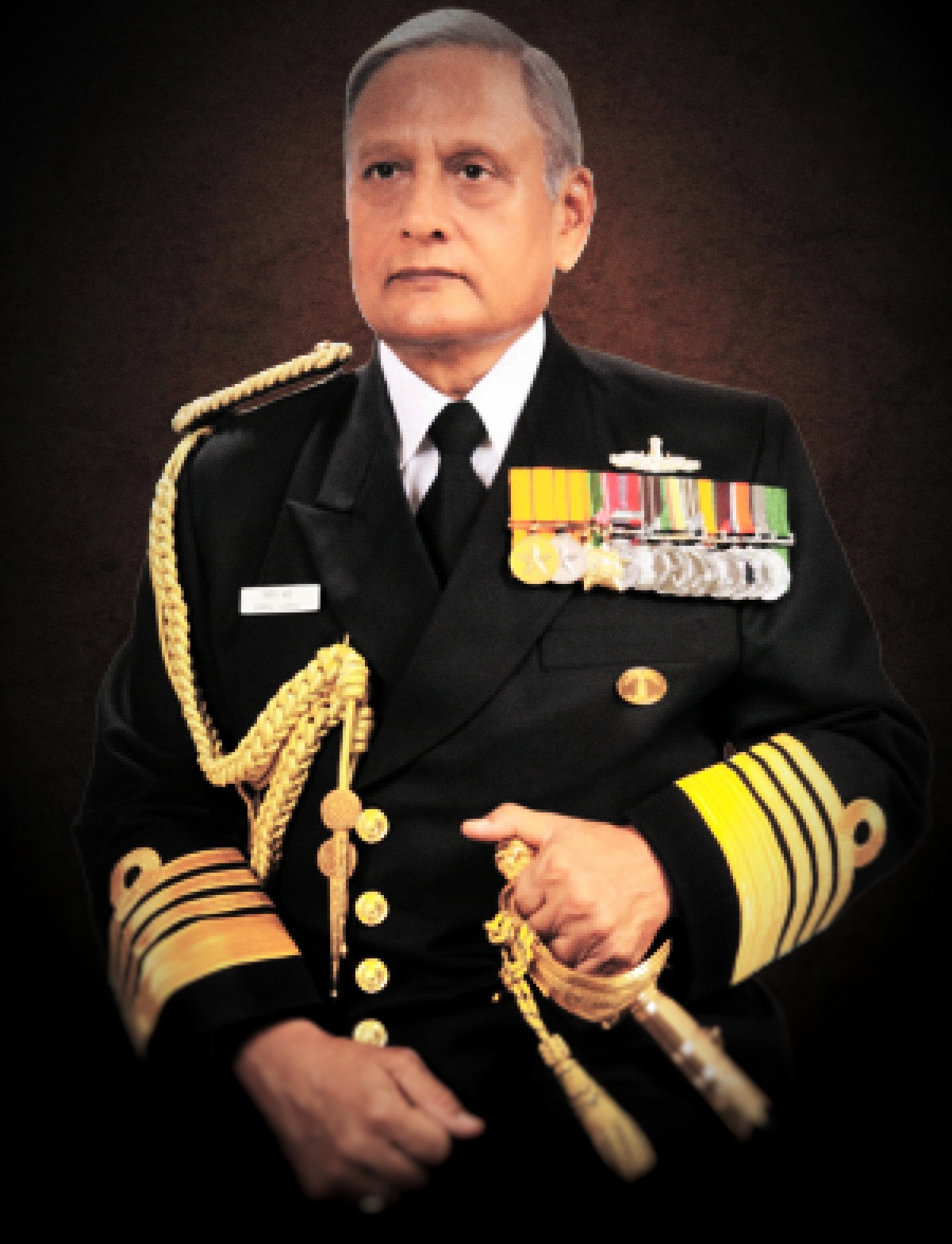
- Admiral Verma as CNS 2009.

24th High Commissioner of India to Canada
- In office November 2012 – November 2014
- Appointed by: President of India (then, Pranab Mukherjee)
- Preceded by: Shashishekhar M. Gavai
- Succeeded by: Vishnu Prakash

51st Chairman of the Chiefs of Staff Committee
- In office 30 July 2011 – 31 August 2012
- President: Pratibha Patil; Pranab Mukherjee
- Prime Minister: Manmohan Singh
- Preceded by: Pradeep Vasant Naik
- Succeeded by: N. A. K. Browne

20th Chief of the Naval Staff
- In office 31 August 2009 – 31 August 2012
- President: Pratibha Patil; Pranab Mukherjee
- Prime Minister: Manmohan Singh
- Preceded by: Sureesh Mehta
- Succeeded by: Devendra Kumar Joshi

Personal details
- Born: 14 November 1950 (age 75)
- Relations: Vice Admiral Bimal Verma (brother)
- Education: Royal Naval Staff College

Military service
- Allegiance: India
- Branch/service: Indian Navy
- Years of service: 1970 – 2012
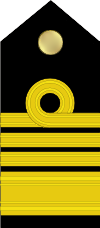
- Rank: Admiral
- Commands: Chief of the Naval Staff; Eastern Naval Command; INS Viraat; INS Ranvir; INS Udaygiri
- Battles/wars: Indo-Pakistani War of 1971; Operation Lal Dora
- Award(s): Param Vishist Seva Medal; Ati Vishist Seva Medal; Sangram Medal
- Later work(s): CNO, US Naval War College

Admiral Nirmal Kumar Verma (born 14 November 1950) is a former senior naval officer who served as the Chief of the Naval Staff of Indian Navy, from 31 August 2009 to 31 August 2012. In November 2012, he was appointed the High Commissioner to Canada.

== Early life ==
Born on 14 November 1950, he joined the Indian Navy at the age of 19. He studied at Goethals Memorial School Kurseong, Royal Naval Staff College in the United Kingdom, and the Naval War College in 1993 in the United States.

== Military career ==
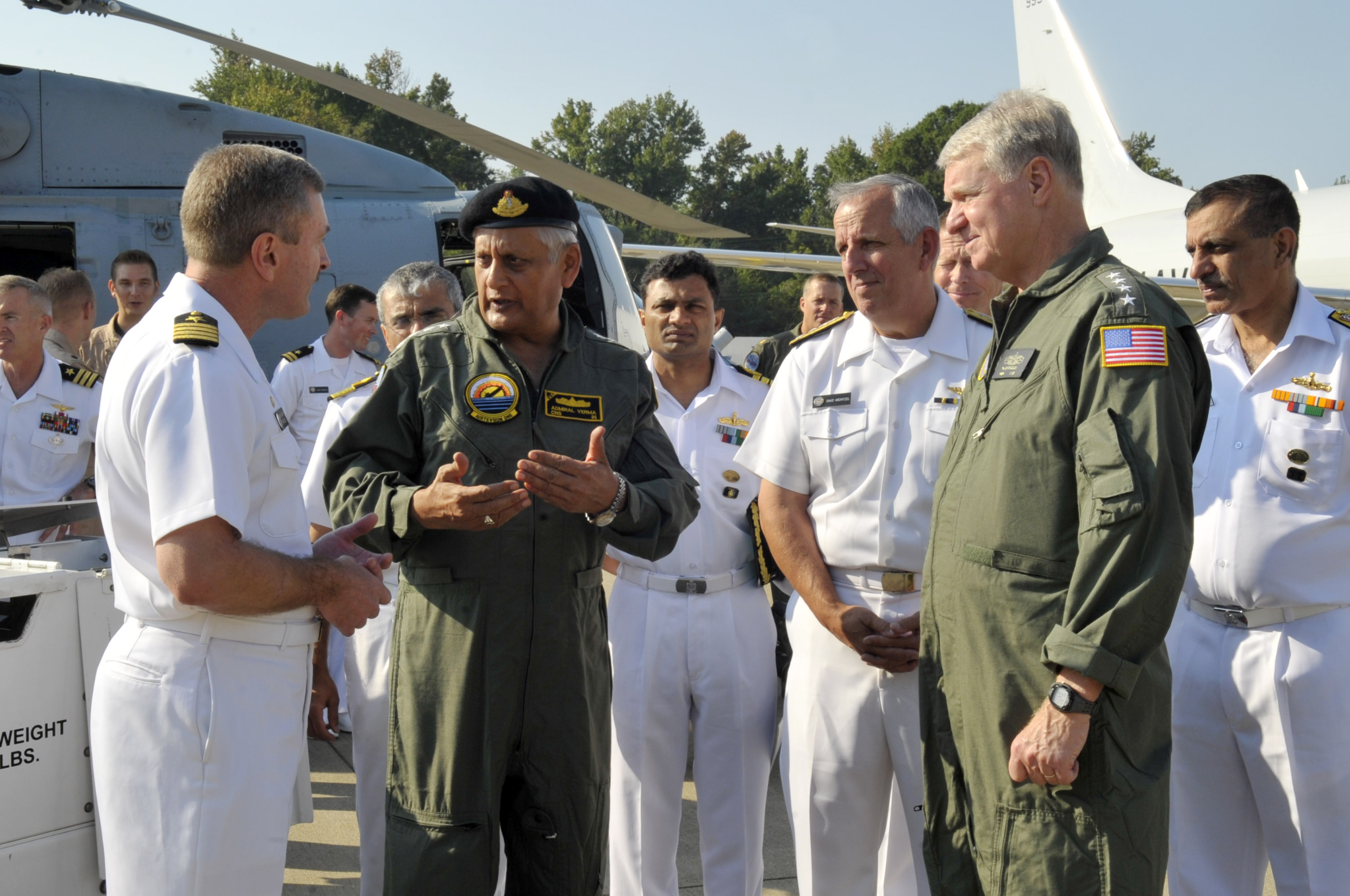
Chief of Naval Operations (CNO) Adm. Gary Roughead, right, and Chief of Naval Staff of the Indian Navy Adm. Nirmal Verma, middle left, tour various aircraft and facilities at Naval Air Station Paxtuxent River

Verma took charge of the Naval Academy in Goa, and subsequently became commander of a series of Indian Navy ships, including INS Ranvir (D54) and INS Viraat, at that time India's only aircraft carrier. He then took over as the Flag Officer Commanding-in-Chief (FOC-in-C) of the Eastern Naval Command, and was appointed Chief of the Indian Navy upon the retirement of Sureesh Mehta on 31 August 2009. During his career he has been awarded several decorations, including the Param Vishisht Seva Medal and the Ati Vishisht Seva Medal. He took over as the Chairman, Chief's of Staff Committee on 30 July 2011 from the then outgoing Chief of Air Staff Air Chief Marshal P V Naik.

== Awards ==

Param Vishisht Seva Medal	Ati Vishisht Seva Medal	Poorvi Star	Paschimi Star
Special Service Medal	Sangram Medal	Operation Parakram Medal	Videsh Seva Medal
50th Anniversary of Independence Medal	25th Anniversary of Independence Medal		30 Years Long Service Medal
	20 Years Long Service Medal	9 Years Long Service Medal	

== Post-retirement ==
Adm Verma was appointed High Commissioner of India to Canada in 2012. He is currently a CNO Distinguished International Fellow at the US Naval War College.

Military offices
Preceded by Pradeep Vasant Naik	Chairman of the Chiefs of Staff Committee; 2011 - 2012	Succeeded by Norman Anil Kumar Browne
Preceded by Sureesh Mehta	Chief of the Naval Staff; 2009–2012	Succeeded by Devendra Kumar Joshi
Preceded by Prem Suthan	Flag Officer Commanding-in-Chief Eastern Naval Command; 2008-2009	Succeeded by Anup Singh
Preceded by R. C. Kochhar	Flag Officer Commanding Maharashtra Naval Area; 2002-2003	Succeeded by M. P. Taneja
Preceded by Vijay Shankar	Commanding officer INS Viraat; 1996-1997	Succeeded by S. K. Damle
