= Denis La Fontaine =

Air Chief Marshal of the Indian Air Force and Chief of Air Staff of India

Air Chief Marshal Denis Anthony La Fontaine PVSM, AVSM, VM
- Air Chief Marshal Denis Anthony La Fontaine
- Born: 17 September 1929; Madras, Madras Presidency, British India (now Chennai, Tamil Nadu, India)
- Died: 6 April 2011 (aged 81) Medak District, Andhra Pradesh
- Allegiance: India
- Branch: Indian Air Force
- Service years: 1950–1988
- Rank: Air chief marshal
- Service number: 3844
- Commands: Central Air Command; Western Air Command; No.47 Black Archers; No.14 Fighting Bulls
- Conflicts: Indo-Pakistani War of 1965; Indo-Pakistani War of 1971
- Awards: Param Vishist Seva Medal; Ati Vishisht Seva Medal; Vayu Sena Medal
- Education: St. Anthony High School, Lahore

13th Chief of the Air Staff
- In office 3 July 1985 – 31 July 1988
- Preceded by: Lakshman Mohan Katre
- Succeeded by: Surinder Kumar Mehra

Air Chief Marshal Denis Anthony La Fontaine, PVSM, AVSM, VM (17 September 1929 – 6 April 2011) was the 13th Chief of Air Staff of the Indian Air Force from 3 July 1985 to 31 July 1988.

== Early life and education ==
Born in Madras, Denis Anthony La Fontaine was the son of Major Je La Fontaine of the Indian Army Medical Corps. His family boasted a lineage of Army service. Both his grandfathers were Indian Army officers. La Fontaine studied at St. Anthony's High School at Lahore and at St. George's College at Musoorie.

== Air force career ==
La Fontaine enrolled into the Indian Air Force in October 1947. He did his flight training on the Tigermoth, moving on to the Harvard, Supermarine Spitfire and Hawker Tempest. La Fontaine was commissioned into the flying branch at Ambala in April 1950.

La Fontaine's first posting was to the No. 7 Squadron, flying the Tempest. When No. 7 converted to De Havilland Vampires in 1951, La Fontaine was one of the first pilots in the Indian Air Force to undergo training in flying the jets, which were the first jet fighters operated by any country in Asia. Soon after, he was selected to undergo the All Purpose Instructors Course. Over the next three years, La Fontaine spent his career imparting beginner, intermediate and operational instructions in flying in a variety of aircraft, including the Tigermoth, Harvard, Spitfire and De Havilland Vampire.

In 1956, La Fontaine returned to operational flying, when he was posted to No. 2 Squadron, flying the Toofanis. Then he was transferred to No. 29 Squadron as a senior flight commander. Command of his own unit came in 1960, when La Fontaine was promoted to squadron leader and was entrusted to raise a new squadron, No. 47. This squadron, also flying the Toofanis, became the first fighter combat squadron to win the inaugural Mukherjee Trophy. After the upgrading of ranks of the squadron commanders of fighter squadrons to wing commander, La Fontaine took over command of No. 14 Squadron at Kalaikunda.

Flying the Hawker Hunter, La Fontaine was involved in the Indo-Pakistani War of 1965. He led an unfruitful fighter interception sweep over the East Pakistani city of Jessore and an abortive interception to Barrackpore. During these operations, he was assisted by Jai Sidhu, who provided crucial support in coordinating the missions. However, despite their efforts, La Fontaine and his team, under strict orders to avoid operations against targets within East Pakistan, did not see much action later on.

== Indo-Pakistani War of 1971 ==
At the outbreak of the Indo-Pakistani War of 1971, he was deputed as a senior staff officer to the Maritime Air Operations Cell in Bombay to help out civilian airline operations.

== Chief of Air Staff ==
On the untimely death of the then-Chief of Air Staff (CAS) Air Chief Marshal L. M. Katre, La Fontaine took over as the CAS in July 1985. He oversaw the IAF inducting state-of-the-art defence fighters like the Mirage 2000 and the MiG-29. Both were procured primarily to counter the Pakistani F-16 threat. The IAF was involved in operations for the first time since 1971, when it undertook supply and relief sorties over Sri Lanka. Later after the induction of the IPKF, the IAF was involved in supply and COIN operations. However La Fontaine could not oversee the complete operations of the Indian Peace Keeping Force. He retired in 1988, succeeded by Surinder Mehra.

== Death ==
La Fontaine died of heart attack on 6 April 2011, at his home in Medak district in Andhra Pradesh; he was 82 and was survived by his wife and three daughters. Medak district Collector S Suresh Kumar laid a wreath on Lafontaine's body on behalf of AP government and paid homage.

== Awards ==
During his tenure he was awarded the Param Vishisht Seva Medal, Ati Vishisht Seva Medal and Vayu Sena Medal for his distinguished service.

== Military honours and decorations ==

Param Vishisht Seva Medal		Ati Vishisht Seva Medal	
Vayusena Medal	General Service Medal		Samar Seva Star
Paschimi Star	Raksha Medal	Sangram Medal	Sainya Seva Medal
25th Anniversary of Independence Medal	30 Years Long Service Medal	20 Years Long Service Medal	9 Years Long Service Medal

Military offices
Preceded by Radhakrishna Hariram Tahiliani	Chairman of the Chiefs of Staff Committee; 1987–1988	Succeeded by Jayant Ganpat Nadkarni
Preceded by Lakshman Katre	Chief of the Air Staff; 1985–1988	Succeeded by Surinder Mehra
