= Joginder Jaswant Singh =

Governor of Arunachal Pradesh and 22nd Chief of the Army Staff of India

General Joginder Jaswant Singh PVSM, AVSM, VSM, ADC
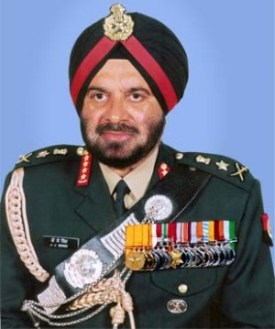

13th Governor of Arunachal Pradesh
- In office 26 January 2008 – 28 May 2013
- Appointed by: President of India (then Pratibha Patil)
- Chief Minister: Dorjee Khandu; Jarbom Gamlin; Nabam Tuki
- Preceded by: K. Sankaranarayanan (Additional Charge)
- Succeeded by: Nirbhay Sharma

47th Chairman of the Chiefs of Staff Committee
- In office 31 March 2007 – 30 September 2007
- President: A. P. J. Abdul Kalam; Pratibha Patil
- Prime Minister: Manmohan Singh
- Preceded by: Shashindra Pal Tyagi
- Succeeded by: Sureesh Mehta

21st Chief of the Army Staff
- In office 1 February 2005 – 31 August 2007
- President: A. P. J. Abdul Kalam; Pratibha Patil
- Prime Minister: Manmohan Singh
- Preceded by: Nirmal Chander Vij
- Succeeded by: Deepak Kapoor

Personal details
- Born: 17 September 1945 (age 81) Samma Satta, Bahawalpur State, British Raj (now in Bahawalpur District, Punjab, Pakistan)
- Party: Shiromani Akali Dal (2017–2019); Shiromani Akali Dal (Taksali) (2019–2022); Bharatiya Janata Party (2022 – present)
- Relations: Jaswant Singh Marwah (Father)
- Writing(s): A Soldier's General (2012); The McMahon Line – A Century of Discord (2019)
- Nickname: General JJ

Military service
- Allegiance: India
- Branch/service: Indian Army
- Years of service: Aug 1964 – 30 September 2007
- Rank: General
- Unit: 9 Maratha Light Infantry
- Commands: Western Army; Army Training Command (ARTRAC); I Corps; 9th Infantry Division; 79th (Independent) Mountain Brigade; 5 Maratha LI; 9 Maratha LI
- Battles/wars: Indo-Pakistani War of 1971; Kargil War; Operation Parakram
- Service number: IC-16078
- Award(s): Param Vishisht Seva Medal; Ati Vishisht Seva Medal; Vishisht Seva Medal; Legion of Honour

General Joginder Jaswant Singh, PVSM, AVSM, VSM, ADC (born 17 September 1945), commonly known as JJ Singh, is an Indian politician and former Army Chief. He was the 21st Chief of the Army Staff (COAS) of the Indian Army. He was appointed on 27 November 2004, and took over the role when his predecessor, General NC Vij, retired on 31 January 2005. He was succeeded by General Deepak Kapoor. He served as the COAS from 31 January 2005, to 30 September 2007.

He is the first Sikh to have led the Indian Army and the 11th chief of army staff from the Western Command based at Chandimandir. At the time of his appointment he was the most senior officer in the army after General NC Vij. Following his retirement, he became Governor of the state of Arunachal Pradesh on 27 January 2008.

== Early life and education ==
Joginder Jaswant Singh was born in a military family in Samma Satta. He is a Sikh Khatri of Sareen sub-caste with origins from Rawalpindi. He is the first child of Lieutenant Colonel Jaswant Singh Marwah (born 1921) and his wife Jaspal Kaur (1923–2006). Sama Satta was then a town in the princely state of Bahawalpur State, now part of Pakistan. His family originated from the town of Daultala, now also in Pakistan, Rawalpindi District. He is a third-generation soldier; his paternal grandfather Sepoy (Private) Atma Singh Marwah (1896–1968) enlisted in the 1/67 Punjab Regiment of the British Indian Army as a drummer in 1914, and fought at the Siege of Kut in the Mesopotamian Campaign during the First World War. Wounded in his right elbow and arm early on, he was evacuated and sent to recuperate in the south of France, after which he was discharged from the army in 1918. Joginder's father, Jaswant, is a veteran of the Second World War who passed out from the Indian Military Academy in April 1943 and was commissioned into the Royal Indian Army Service Corps. In 1943, he was posted to the Reserve Supply Depot at Karachi, and married his wife Jaspal Kaur in December 1944. In February 1945, he was posted to Sama Satta and given command of a petroleum sub-depot; Joginder was born that September. After independence and Partition in August 1947, the family migrated to Patiala in India. In 1948, Jaswant transferred to the Indian Army Corps of Electrical and Mechanical Engineers as a captain.

Growing up, Joginder and his family lived in different army cantonments across north India, as his father was frequently transferred. As an army brat, Joginder naturally took to army life and culture. He received his early education in Catholic convent schools, St. Anne's in Secunderabad and St Mary's Presentation Convent in Jammu, where his father was stationed from 1956 to 1960 as a major commanding the Recovery Company. In 1958, he transferred to Model Academy in Jammu and matriculated in 1960. While Jaswant was posted to Udhampur in 1959, the family remained in Jammu.

== Military career ==
=== Early career ===
In January 1961, Joginder joined the 25th course of the National Defence Academy, and was still a cadet when the Sino-Indian War broke out in 1962. The deputy commandant of the NDA at the time, Brigadier Hoshiar Singh, was given command of a brigade under the 4th Infantry Division and was killed in action. Largely unprepared for war and humiliated by its defeats, the Indian armed forces underwent a large-scale expansion after hostilities ended, with emergency commissions given to several thousand candidates from 1963 to 1965. The one-year training at the NDA was shortened to seven months, as a result of which Joginder and his class were commissioned early as second lieutenants on 2 August 1964, with Joginder receiving his officer's pips from his father at the passing-out ceremony. His grandfather Atma Singh also gave him his blessing, saying, "God willing, the son of a private shall be a Karnail, and the son of the Karnail shall be a Jarnail!"

Gen. Singh is an alumnus of the National Defence Academy and was commissioned into the 9 Maratha Light Infantry on 2 August 1964. He received the colour of the battalion from the late president Dr. Zakir Husain at the Investiture Parade in 1968.

During his tenure with the 7th and 9th Maratha LI and also while on higher command and staff appointments, General Singh has served in Jammu & Kashmir, Nagaland, Arunachal Pradesh, Sikkim, and Jyotirmath in Uttarakhand. He was awarded the Vishisht Seva Medal during his command tenure with the 9 Maratha Light Infantry in Arunachal Pradesh. He later commanded the 5th Maratha LI at Hyderabad in the rank of colonel. A consistent front-runner, he was the youngest and one of the first in his batch to attend Staff College, Senior Command, Higher Command and National Defence College courses. He has contributed articles to regimental and other professional journals and his thesis on "Sino-Indian Border Dispute" and "Strategy to Boost Defence Exports" have been highly acclaimed. He also has the honour of being India's first Defence attaché to Algeria (1987–1990).

After returning from Algeria, General Singh commanded the 79th (Independent) Mountain Brigade in the Baramula Sector, Jammu & Kashmir, during the peak of insurgency there in 1991–92. During this tenure, he was gravely wounded in action leading from the front, in a fierce engagement with terrorists infiltrating across the Line of Control (LoC). For that operation, he received the War Wound Medal and was awarded the Chief of Army Staff's Commendation. He was nominated to attend the prestigious National Defence College (NDC) course in 1993. He was posted as Deputy Director General Operational Logistics in Army HQ after the NDC Course.

=== General Officer ===
Singh commanded the 9th Infantry Division from 1996 to 1998. He was then selected for a key appointment as the Additional Director General Military Operations (ADGMO) at Army HQ, Military Operations Directorate. During his tenure as ADGMO, he contributed positively to evolving India's policy on the Sino-Indian border issue and visited Beijing as part of the Joint Working Group. He was also part of the Ministry of Defence team for talks with Pakistan on the Siachen and Sir Creek issue in 1998. He also visited Sierra Leone with the defence minister, where an Indian contingent carried out successful operations as part of the UN Mission. As the ADGMO, he became the Indian Army's public face during the 1999 Kargil conflict. He was decorated with the Ati Vishisht Seva Medal in recognition of his services in the planning and execution of the war.

General Singh assumed command of the elite 1 Strike Corps at Mathura. He successfully coordinated the corps-level exercise Poorna Vijay in May 2001 in the deserts of Rajasthan. He subsequently led I Corps during Operation Parakram, the military standoff against Pakistan, from December 2001 to December 2002. He was then appointed GOC-in-C of the Army Training Command (ARTRAC) in January 2003, where he was credited with drafting a new doctrine for the Indian Army. He was instrumental in giving the Command a distinctly discernible and widely appreciated thrust towards modernisation. After his stint at ARTRAC, he stated, "Every assignment has its own importance, but the one at ARTRAC, the think-tank of the Army, has been quite different as it plays a crucial role in preparing the Army for future challenges in a constantly changing battlefield milieu. The responsibility involved development of new concepts and doctrines at the strategic and operational levels for the emerging security environment, besides framing of the training policy and providing training support to the Army in all its facets." He was awarded the Param Vishisht Seva Medal (PVSM) on 26 January 2004 for his distinguished services of the highest order.

General Singh took over as the General Officer Commanding-in-Chief Western Command on 1 February 2004, and his tenure at this elite command provided an opportunity to put into practice the concepts and doctrines evolved at ARTRAC. He refined operational planning by co-opting the battle-winning role of Revolution in Military Affairs (RMA) and provided focused direction based on the recently released "Doctrine for the Indian Army", having earlier been its architect. He simultaneously gave training a visionary direction in conjunction with principles of synergetic cohesiveness at all levels. His tenure at Western Command also saw a quantum leap in the implementation of the Ex-servicemen Contributory Health Scheme (ECHS). He was also appointed as Honorary aide-de-camp (ADC) to the President of India on 1 February 2004.

=== Chief of Army Staff ===
Gen Singh during the IMA passing out parade.

"We fight to win and win with a knock out, because there are no runners up in war."

—

Gen. Joginder Jaswant Singh assumed command of the Indian Army, as the 22nd chief of army staff, on 31 January 2005 commanding an army of over a million soldiers. On assuming the office of Chief of Army Staff on 1 February 2005, General Singh stated in a message, "We stand poised at a critical juncture in the timeline of history. Having left behind us the vagaries of the past, we purposefully stride towards economic growth, social harmony, peace and prosperity. Simultaneously and seamlessly, we are also making the transition to a highly motivated and modern Army, driven by the engines of high technology and Revolution in Military Affairs. I assure our countrymen that the Army will remain at the service of the nation, at all times, ready and eager to take on any challenge with determination and resolve to emerge victorious." He is widely considered to be a thinking soldier and is a through professional. squash, and golf. He is also a keen mountaineer who has trained under the late Tenzing Norgay at the Himalayan Mountaineering Institute, Darjeeling. Affectionately known as "General JJ" within army circles, he was appointed Colonel of the Maratha Light Infantry on 10 October 2001. He is an ace shooter and plays basketball.

== Political career ==
He joined the Shiromani Akali Dal in the presence of party president and Deputy Chief Minister of Punjab Sukhbir Singh Badal. He unsuccessfully contested against Captain Amarinder Singh from Patiala Urban seat in 2017 Punjab Legislative Assembly election as the Shiromani Akali Dal candidate.

In 2019 he joined Shiromani Akali Dal (Taksali) and contested and lost from Khadoor Sahib (Lok Sabha constituency). In 2022 he joined Bharatiya Janata Party.

== Electoral performance ==
Punjab Assembly election, 2017: Patiala
Party	Candidate	Votes	%	±%
INC	Amarinder Singh	72,586	68.98	
AAP	Dr. Balbir Singh	20,179	19.18	
SAD	Gen J.J. Singh	11,677	11.10	
HSS	Kshama Kant Pandey	291	0.28	
NOTA	None of the above	1,090	1.04	
Majority		52,407	49.31	
Turnout		1,06,436	67.00	
Registered electors		158,855		
INC hold		Swing		

== Personal life ==
He is married to Mrs Anupama Singh and they have a son and a daughter. Singh and his wife both belong to the Marwah clan, though neither uses the name as their surname.

He is fluent in Arabic and French, the widely spoken languages in Algeria.

In 2016, he was decorated by the French government as an Officer of the Legion of Honour.

== Writings ==
A Soldier's General published in 2012 is an autobiography of Singh. The McMahon Line – A Century of Discord written by Singh, provides a detailed description of the border dispute between India and China.

== Awards ==

Param Vishisht Seva Medal	Ati Vishisht Seva Medal	Vishisht Seva Medal	Wound Medal
General Service Medal Medal	Samanya Seva Medal	Special Service Medal	Paschimi Star
Operation Vijay Star	Raksha Medal	Sangram Medal	Operation Vijay Medal
Operation Parakram Medal	Sainya Seva Medal	High Altitude Service Medal	50th Anniversary of Independence Medal
25th Anniversary of Independence Medal	30 Years Long Service Medal	20 Years Long Service Medal	9 Years Long Service Medal
Officer of the Legion of Honour

== Dates of rank ==
Insignia	Rank	Component	Date of rank
	Second Lieutenant	Indian Army	2 August 1964
	Lieutenant	Indian Army	2 August 1966
	Captain	Indian Army	2 August 1970
	Major	Indian Army	2 August 1977
	Lieutenant-Colonel	Indian Army	17 August 1984 (substantive)
	Colonel	Indian Army	23 February 1987
	Brigadier	Indian Army	1 December 1991
	Major General	Indian Army	1 February 1997
	Lieutenant-General	Indian Army	1 April 2001
	General (COAS)	Indian Army	31 January 2005

Military offices
Preceded by Shashindra Pal Tyagi	Chairman of the Chiefs of Staff Committee; 2007-2007	Succeeded by Sureesh Mehta
Preceded by Nirmal Chander Vij	Chief of Army Staff; 2005–2007	Succeeded by Deepak Kapoor
Preceded by Shamsher Singh Mehta	General Officer Commanding-in-Chief Western Command; 2004–2005	Succeeded by S Patabhiraman
Preceded by H B Kala	General Officer Commanding-in-Chief Army Training Command; January 2003 – January 2004	Succeeded by K Nagaraj
Government offices
Preceded by K. Sankaranarayanan	Governor of Arunachal Pradesh; 2008–2013	Succeeded by Nirbhay Sharma
