= Deepak Kapoor =

Former chief of the Indian Army

General Deepak Kapoor PVSM, AVSM, SM, VSM, ADC
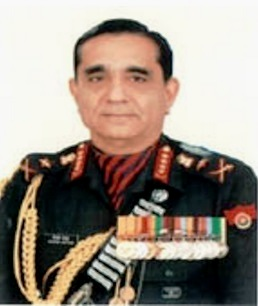

22nd Chief of the Army Staff
- In office 1 October 2007 – 31 March 2010
- President: Pratibha Patil
- Prime Minister: Manmohan Singh
- Preceded by: J.J. Singh
- Succeeded by: V.K. Singh

Personal details
- Born: 1948 (age 77–78) Patna, Bihar
- Awards: Param Vishisht Seva Medal; Ati Vishisht Seva Medal; Vishisht Seva Medal; Sena Medal

Military service
- Allegiance: India
- Branch/service: Indian Army
- Years of service: 11 June 1967 – 31 March 2010
- Rank: General
- Commands: Northern Army; ARTRAC; XXXIII Corps; 22 Mountain Division; 161 Infantry Brigade; Independent Artillery Brigade, 2 Corps; 74 Medium Regiment
- Battles/wars: Indo-Pakistani War of 1971; United Nations Operation in Somalia II

General Deepak Kapoor PVSM, AVSM, SM, VSM, ADC (born 1948) served as the 22nd Chief of the Army Staff of the Indian Army, appointed on 30 September 2007 and Chairman of the Chiefs of Staff Committee appointed on 31 August 2009.

== Biography ==
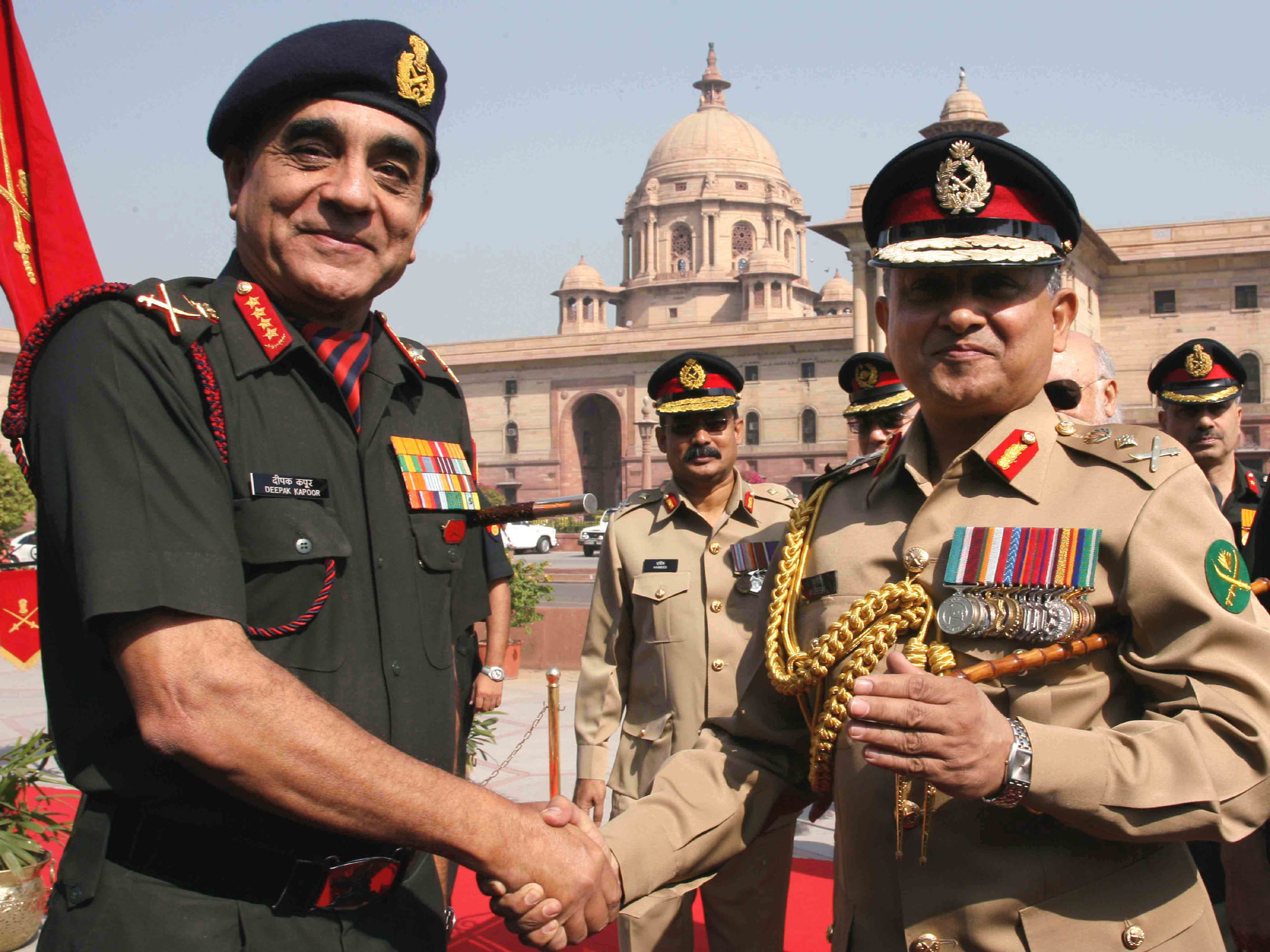
General Kapoor with Bangladeshi Chief of Army Staff General Abdul Mubeen at New Delhi on 15 March 2010.

Kapoor was commissioned into the Regiment of Artillery on 11 June 1967. He is an alumnus of Sainik School, Kunjpura; National Defence Academy Khadakwasla (30th Course) and Indian Military Academy, Dehradun. His career in the Indian Army spans four decades, during which he has held varied command and as well as staff appointments. A veteran of the 1971 Indo-Pak War in the eastern theatre (Bangladesh), he is an alumnus of the Defence Services Staff College in Wellington and has completed the Higher Command Course at Army War College, Mhow and the National Defence College course at the National Defence College in New Delhi. He served as the Chief Operations Officer for UNOSOM II (United Nations Operation in Somalia II) during 1994–95 and was awarded the Vishisht Seva Medal in January 1996.

Kapoor commanded the 161 Infantry Brigade in Uri, Jammu & Kashmir which was actively involved in operations along the Line of Control. For his performance he was awarded the Sena Medal in January 1998. He commanded the 22nd Mountain Division as part of a Strike Corps during Operation Parakram in 2001–02. He was thereafter deeply involved in counter insurgency operations combating the insurgency in Assam, as Chief of Staff of 4 Corps in Tezpur. On promotion to Lieutenant General, he commanded 33 Corps at Siliguri, West Bengal. For his service as a Corps Commander, he was awarded the Ati Vishisht Seva Medal in January 2006. On elevation to the appointment of Army Commander, he commanded the Army Training Command (ARTRAC) in Shimla. Thereafter he moved to spearhead the Northern Command (India), the largest operational command in the Indian Army, deployed over varied terrain and was once again actively involved in COIN operations. For his performance, he was awarded the Param Vishisht Seva Medal in January 2007.

Kapoor was appointed the Honorary Aide-De-Camp to the Supreme Commander of the Armed Forces, the President of India. He was also the senior Colonel Commandant of the Regiment of Artillery. Kapoor was Vice-Chief of the Army before taking over as the Chief of Army Staff.

== Personal life ==
Kapoor holds master's degrees in Political Science, Military Science and Business Administration, the latter which he completed at the Indira Gandhi National Open University in New Delhi. He also holds a diploma in Business Management. He is married to Kirti Kapoor and they have two children – a daughter and a son, both of whom are married.

== Major Decorations and Badges ==
- Param Vishisht Seva Medal
- Ati Vishisht Seva Medal
- Sena Medal
- Vishisht Seva Medal

== Awards ==

Param Vishisht Seva Medal	Ati Vishisht Seva Medal	Sena Medal	Vishisht Seva Medal
Poorvi Star	Special Service Medal	Sangram Medal	Operation Parakram Medal
Sainya Seva Medal	Videsh Seva Medal	50th Anniversary of Independence Medal	25th Anniversary of Independence Medal
30 Years Long Service Medal	20 Years Long Service Medal	9 Years Long Service Medal	UNOSOM II

== Dates of rank ==
Insignia	Rank	Component	Date of rank
	Second Lieutenant	Indian Army	11 June 1967
	Lieutenant	Indian Army	11 June 1969
	Captain	Indian Army	11 June 1973
	Major	Indian Army	11 June 1980
	Lieutenant-Colonel	Indian Army	3 May 1988
	Colonel	Indian Army	1 November 1991
	Brigadier	Indian Army	18 January 1996
	Major General	Indian Army	3 June 2001
	Lieutenant-General	Indian Army	29 June 2004 (seniority from 1 March)
	General (COAS)	Indian Army	1 October 2007

Military offices
Preceded by Sureesh Mehta	Chairman of the Chiefs of Staff Committee; 2009–2010	Succeeded by Pradeep Vasant Naik
Preceded by Joginder Jaswant Singh	Chief of Army Staff; 2007–2010	Succeeded by V K Singh
Preceded by Hari Prasad	General Officer-Commanding-in-Chief Northern Command; 2005–2006	Succeeded by H. S. Panag
