= List of serving marshals of the Indian Air Force =

This is a list of serving marshals of the Indian Air Force.

== Chief of Defence Staff ==
Post	Rank	Name	Photo	Decorations	Reference
Chief of Defence Staff (Secretary, Department of Military Affairs)*	Air Chief Marshal	Presently tenanted by an Indian Army Officer			

*Rotational appointment among the Indian Armed Forces.

== Chief of the Air Staff ==
The Chief of the Air Staff is the only serving Four Star Air Officer in the Indian Air Force.

Post	Rank	Name	Photo	Decorations	Reference
Chief of the Air Staff	Air Chief Marshal	Ashutosh Dixit		PVSM, AVSM, VM, VSM	

== Vice Chief of the Air Staff ==
Post	Rank	Name	Photo	Decorations	Reference
Vice Chief of the Air Staff	Air Marshal	Inderpal Singh Walia		AVSM, VM	

== Air Commanders (Commander-in-Chief grade) ==
Post	Rank	Name	Photo	Decorations	Reference
Air Officer Commanding-in-Chief; Western Air Command	Air Marshal	George Thomas		AVSM, VM	
Air Officer Commanding-in-Chief; Central Air Command	Air Marshal	Tarun Chaudhry		AVSM, VSM	
Air Officer Commanding-in-Chief; South Western Air Command	Air Marshal	P. V. Shivanand		AVSM, VM	
Air Officer Commanding-in-Chief; Eastern Air Command	Air Marshal	Mehtab Singh Deswal		AVSM, VM	
Air Officer Commanding-in-Chief; Southern Air Command	Air Marshal	Jasvir Singh Mann		AVSM, VM	
Air Officer Commanding-in-Chief; Training Command	Air Marshal	Seethepalli Shrinivas		PVSM, AVSM, VSM	
Air Officer Commanding-in-Chief; Maintenance Command	Air Marshal	Yalla Umesh		VSM	
Chief of Integrated Defence Staff**	Air Marshal	Tejinder Singh		PVSM, AVSM, VM	
Commander-in-Chief, Andaman and Nicobar Command**	Air Marshal	Presently tenanted by an Indian Navy officer			
Commander-in-Chief, Strategic Forces Command**	Air Marshal	Presently tenanted by an Indian Army officer			
Director General Armed Forces Medical Services**	Air Marshal	Sandeep Thareja		SM, VSM**	

**Rotational Command among the Indian Armed Forces.

== Principal Staff Officers at Air Headquarters ==
Post	Rank	Name	Photo	Decorations	Reference
Deputy Chief of the Air Staff	Air Marshal	Tejpal Singh		AVSM, VM	
Air Officer in Charge, Personnel	Air Marshal	Hardeep Bains		AVSM, VSM	
Air Officer in Charge, Administration	Air Marshal	S Sivakumar		VSM	
Air Officer in Charge, Maintenance	Air Marshal	K A A Sanjeeb		AVSM, VSM	
Director General Inspection and Safety	Air Marshal	Tejbir Singh		AVSM, VM	

== Air Officers of Tri-Services Commands ==
Post	Rank	Name	Photo	Decorations	Reference
Additional Secretary, Department of Military Affairs	Air Marshal	Vikram Gaur		AVSM, VM	
Deputy Chief of Integrated Defence Staff (Operations)	Air Marshal	Presently tenanted by an Indian Army officer			
Deputy Chief of Integrated Defence Staff (Policy Planning & Force Development)	Air Marshal	Devendra Parshotam Hirani		YSM, VSM	
Director General DIA & Deputy Chief of Integrated Defence Staff (Intelligence)	Air Marshal	Presently tenanted by an Indian Army officer			
Deputy Chief of Integrated Defence Staff (Doctrine, Organization & Training)	Air Marshal	Presently tenanted by an Indian Navy Officer			
Deputy Chief of Integrated Defence Staff (Medical)	Air Marshal	Presently tenanted by an Indian Navy Officer			
Deputy Commander-in-Chief, Strategic Forces Command	Air Marshal	Presently tenanted by an Indian Army officer			
Director General (Organisation & Personnel); Armed Forces Medical Services	Air Marshal	Kaushik Chatterjee		AVSM	
Director General Hospital Services; Armed Forces Medical Services	Air Marshal	Presently tenanted by an Indian Navy Officer			

== Heads of Services and Directorates ==
Post	Rank	Name	Photo	Decorations	Reference
Director General Air Operations	Air Marshal	Joseph Suares		YSM, VM	
Director General (Weapons Systems)	Air Marshal	Premkumar Krishnaswamy		VM, VSM	
Director General (Aircraft)	Air Marshal				
Director General Medical Services (Air)	Air Marshal	Vivek Hande		AVSM, VSM	
Director General (Administration)	Air Marshal	PCP Anand		VSM	

== Senior Staff Officers of Air Commands ==
Post	Rank	Name	Photo	Decorations	Reference
Senior Air Staff Officer Western Air Command	Air Marshal	Ashish Singh		VM, VSM	
Senior Air Staff Officer Central Air Command	Air Marshal	Peri Venkat Surya Narayana			
Senior Air Staff Officer South Western Air Command	Air Marshal	Manish Sahdev		AVSM, VSM	
Senior Air Staff Officer Eastern Air Command	Air Marshal	Sanjeev Vashishth		AVSM, VM	
Senior Air Staff Officer Southern Air Command	Air Marshal	Sartaj Bedi		VM, VSM	
Senior Air Staff Officer Training Command	Air Marshal	Samir Jayasinha Pendse		VM, VSM	
Senior Maintenance Staff Officer Maintenance Command	Air Marshal	Ajay Kumar Pan		AVSM, VSM	

== Commandants of Training Institutions ==
Post	Rank	Name	Photo	Decorations	Reference
Commandant National Defence Academy	Air Marshal	Presently tenanted by an Indian Navy Officer			
Commandant Air Force Academy	Air Marshal	Rahul Bhasin		VM	
Commandant Defence Services Staff College	Air Marshal	Presently tenanted by an Indian Army officer			
Commandant National Defence College	Air Marshal	Manish Kumar Gupta		AVSM	
Commandant College of Air Warfare	Air Vice Marshal	Pradeep Arun Shah		AVSM, VM	
Commandant College of Defence Management	Air Vice Marshal	G K J Reddy			
Commandant Military Institute of Technology	Air Vice Marshal	Presently tenanted by an Indian Army officer			

== See also ==
- List of serving generals of the Indian Army
- List of serving admirals of the Indian Navy
