= B Chandra Sekhar =

Air Marshal, Indian Air Force

Air Marshal B Chandra Sekhar PVSM AVSM
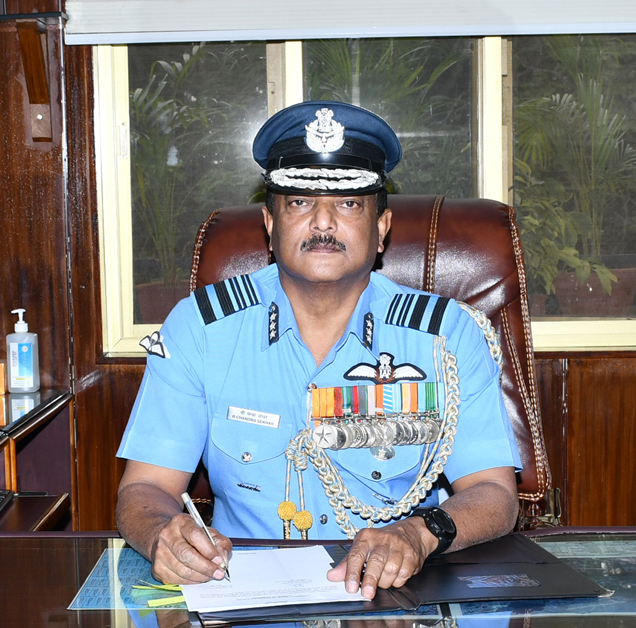
- Born: Telangana
- Military career
- Allegiance: India
- Branch: Indian Air Force
- Service years: 21 December 1984 - 31 August 2023
- Rank: Air Marshal
- Service number: 17726
- Unit: No. 130 Helicopter Unit
- Commands: Air Force Academy
- Awards: Param Vishisht Seva Medal; Ati Vishisht Seva Medal

Air Marshal B Chandra Sekhar, PVSM, AVSM is a retired officer of the Indian Air Force. He served as the commandant of the Air Force Academy. He assumed the office on 8 March 2022 succeeding Air Marshal Sreekumar Prabhakaran. Previously, he served as the Senior Air Staff Officer - Training Command.

== Early life and education ==
B Chandra Sekhar is a native of Telangana. He is an alumnus of Defence Services Staff College, Wellington, National Defence Academy, Khadagwasla, Flying Instructors School, College of Defence Management and National Defence College, New Delhi.

== Career ==
B Chandra Sekhar was commissioned in the flying branch of the Indian Air Force on 21 December 1984. He has over 5400 hours of incident free flying on various aircraft.

B Chandra Sekhar is a qualified flying instructor and has the accolade of the landing a medium-lift helicopter in Siachen Glacier.

With a long career of 38 years. He has served as appointments such as Ops IIB in the Eastern Sector, Principal Director (Administration) in Strategic Forces Command. He was instrumental in induction of Chinook helicopters and Rafale jet in the Eastern Air Command of the Indian Air Force.

As an Air Vice Marshal, he served as the Senior Officer-in-charge Administration for both Southern Air Command and Eastern Air Command.

He served as the Senior Air Staff Officer - Training Command till 7 March 2022.

He superannuated on 31 August 2023 and was succeeded by Air Marshal Seethepalli Shrinivas.

== Honours and decorations ==
During his career, B Chandra Sekhar has been awarded the Param Vishisht Seva Medal in 2024 and the Ati Vishisht Seva Medal in 2020.

Param Vishisht Seva Medal	Ati Vishisht Seva Medal	Samanya Seva Medal	Special Service Medal
Operation Parakram Medal	Sainya Seva Medal	High Altitude Service Medal	75th Anniversary of Independence Medal
50th Anniversary of Independence Medal	30 Years Long Service Medal	20 Years Long Service Medal	
9 Years Long Service Medal	MONUA		

== Personal life ==
B Chandra Shekhar is married to Mrs B Komala, who is an experienced banker. They are blessed with a daughter and a son who are both commissioned officers in the Indian Air Force.

Military offices
Preceded by Sreekumar Prabhakaran	Commandant – Air Force Academy; 8 March 2022 – 31 August 2023	Succeeded by Seethepalli Shrinivas
Preceded by T.D Joseph	Senior Air Staff Officer - Training Command; 1 August 2021 – 7 March 2022	Succeeded by Saju Balakrishnan
