= Seethepalli Shrinivas =

Indian Air Force air marshal

Air Marshal Seethepalli Shrinivas PVSM AVSM VSM
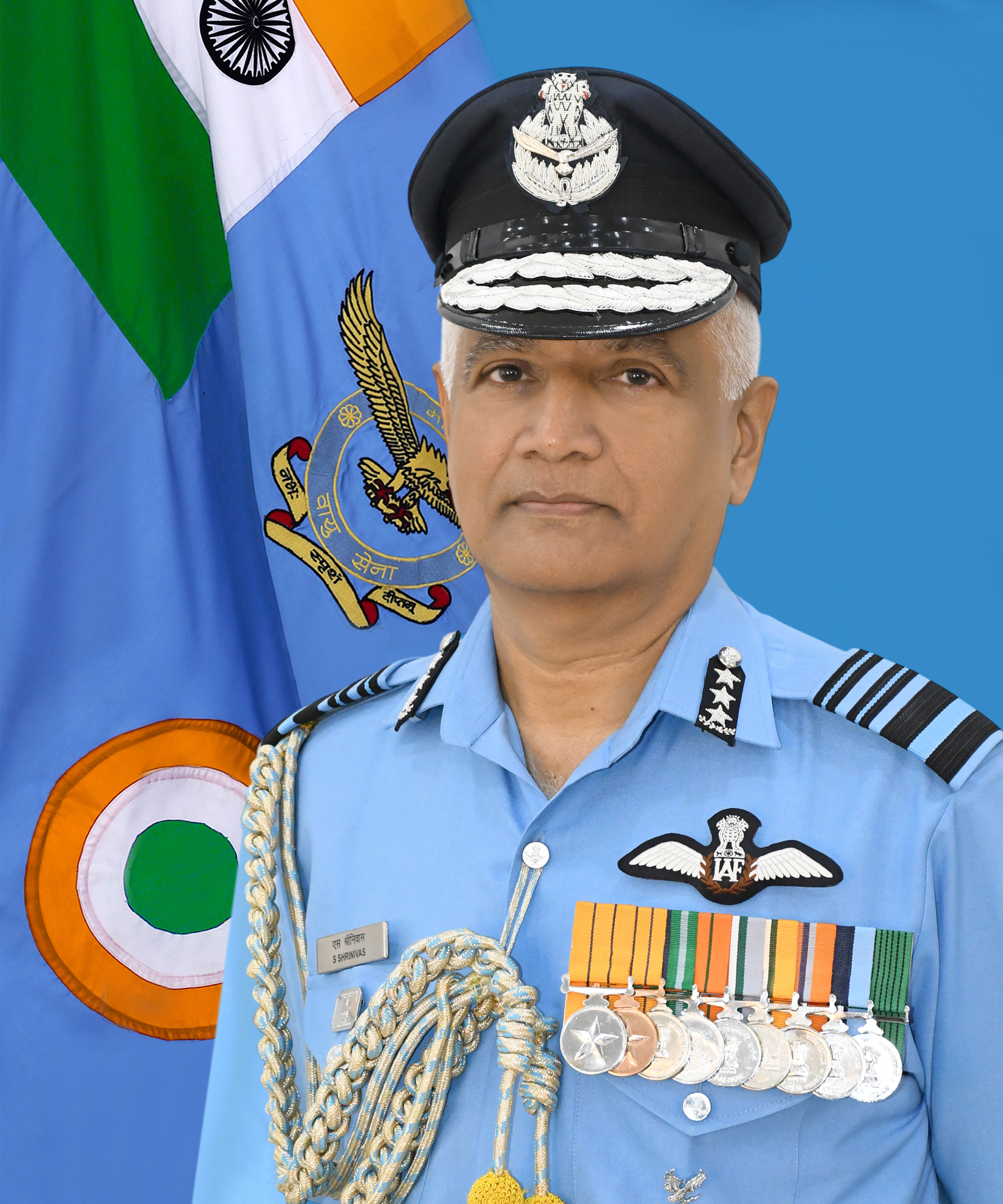

Air Officer Commanding-in-Chief Training Command
- Incumbent
- Assumed office 1 January 2026
- Chief of Air Staff: Amar Preet Singh
- Preceded by: Tejinder Singh

Military service
- Allegiance: India
- Branch/service: Indian Air Force
- Years of service: 13 June 1987 – Present
- Rank: Air Marshal
- Commands: Training Command; Air Force Academy; 5 Forward Base Support Unit; AFS Tambaram; Institute of Aerospace Safety; Flying Instructors School
- Service number: 18787
- Awards: Param Vishisht Seva Medal; Ati Vishisht Seva Medal; Vishisht Seva Medal

Air Marshal Seethepalli Shrinivas, PVSM, AVSM, VSM is a serving officer of the Indian Air Force. He is currently serving as the Air Officer Commanding-in-Chief, Training Command. He was previously serving as the Senior Air Staff Officer, South Western Air Command, prior to that he was the Commandant, Air Force Academy.

== Early life and education ==
The Air officer is an alumnus of the National Defence Academy, Khadakwasla and the Air Force Academy, Dundigal. He is also an alumnus of the Defence Services Staff College, Wellington, the College of Defence Management, Secunderabad and the National Defence College, New Delhi. He holds a degree in Master of Philosophy in Defence and Strategic Studies, Master of Management Studies and Master of Science in Defence and Strategic Studies.

== Military career ==
He was commissioned into the fighter stream of the Indian Air Force on 13 June 1987 from the Air Force Academy. Throughout a career of over 38 years, he has more than 4200 hours of flying experience across various fighter jets and has held numerous staff & instructional appointments. He is a highly experienced fighter pilot, qualified flying instructor and a fighter combat leader. He has flown on the MiG-21, Iskra, Kiran, PC-7 Mk Il, HPT-32, Microlite and also qualified as a 2nd pilot on the Chetak / Cheetah helicopter. He is a categorised Operations Officer on the Pechora missile system. He is a Category A qualified flying instructor, his instructional appointments include being the Directing Staff at College of Air Warfare, Chief Instructor Flying at Air Force Academy. He served as the Commanding Officer of Basic Flying Training School as a Wing Commander, and later as the Commanding Officer of the Flying Instructors School as a Group Captain.

As an Air Commodore, he served as the Commandant of Institute of Aerospace Safety, as the Air Officer Commanding, AFS Tambaram, and later as the Air Officer Commanding, 5 Forward Base Support Unit.

As an Air Vice Marshal, he served as the Air Officer Commanding, Advance HQ Western Air Command and as the Assistant Chief of Air Staff, Personnel Officers at the Air Headquarters, New Delhi.

After being promoted to the rank of Air Marshal, on 1 September 2023 he took over as the Commandant of Air Force Academy, Dundigal. Later on 1 June 2025, he assumed the appointment of Senior Air Staff Officer, South Western Air Command. On 1 January 2026, Air Marshal Seethepalli Shrinivas took over as the Air Officer Commanding-in-Chief, Training Command succeeding Air Marshal Tejinder Singh who moved to South Western Air Command as Air Commander.

== Awards and decorations ==

Param Vishisht Seva Medal		Ati Vishisht Seva Medal	
Vishisht Seva Medal	Samanya Seva Medal	Sainya Seva Medal	75th Anniversary of Independence Medal
50th Independence Anniversary Medal	30 Years Long Service Medal	20 Years Long Service Medal	9 Years Long Service Medal

== Date of ranks ==
Insignia	Rank	Component	Date of rank
	Pilot Officer	Indian Air Force	13 June 1987
	Flying Officer	Indian Air Force	13 June 1988
	Flight Lieutenant	Indian Air Force	13 June 1992
	Squadron Leader	Indian Air Force	13 June 1998
	Wing Commander	Indian Air Force	11 May 2004
	Group Captain	Indian Air Force	1 September 2009
	Air Commodore	Indian Air Force	1 July 2014
	Air Vice Marshal	Indian Air Force	1 October 2020
	Air Marshal	Indian Air Force	1 September 2023 (AOC-in-C from 1 January 2026)

Military offices
Preceded by Tejinder Singh	Air Officer Commanding-in-Chief; Training Command; 1 January 2026 – Present	Succeeded by Incumbent
Preceded by Manish Khanna	Senior Air Staff Officer; South Western Air Command; 1 June 2025 – 31 December 2025	Succeeded by Mehtab Singh Deshwal
Preceded by B Chandra Sekhar	Commandant – Air Force Academy; 1 September 2023 – 31 May 2025	Succeeded by Praveen Keshav Vohra
