= Sujeet Pushpakar Dharkar =

Former Vice Chief of Air Staff

Air Marshal Sujeet Pushpakar Dharkar PVSM UYSM AVSM
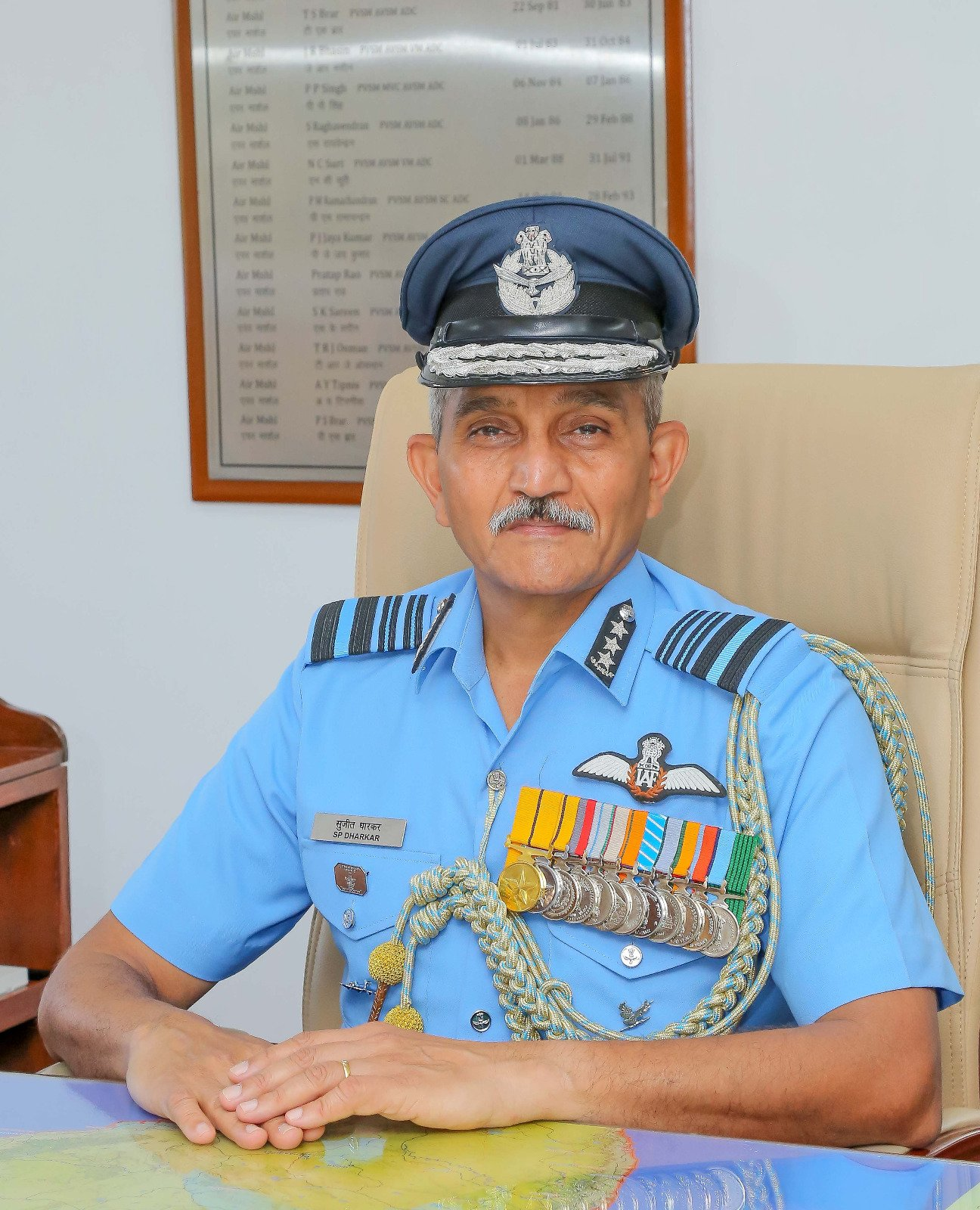

48th Vice Chief of the Air Staff
- In office 3 October 2024 – 30 April 2025
- Chief of Air Staff: Amar Preet Singh
- Preceded by: Amar Preet Singh
- Succeeded by: Narmdeshwar Tiwari

Air Officer Commanding-in-Chief Eastern Air Command
- In office 1 October 2022 – 30 September 2024
- Chief of Air Staff: Vivek Ram Chaudhari
- Preceded by: Dilip Kumar Patnaik
- Succeeded by: Surat Singh

Military service
- Allegiance: India
- Branch/service: Indian Air Force
- Years of service: 14 June 1985 – 30 April 2025
- Rank: Air Marshal
- Unit: No. 31 Squadron
- Commands: Eastern Air Command; Defence Space Agency; AFS Bidar; No. 18 Squadron
- Service Number: 17841
- Awards: Param Vishisht Seva Medal; Uttam Yudh Seva Medal; Ati Vishisht Seva Medal

Air Marshal Sujeet Pushpakar Dharkar, PVSM, UYSM, AVSM is a retired officer of the Indian Air Force. He last served as the Vice Chief of the Air Staff . He previously served as the Air Officer Commanding-in-Chief, Eastern Air Command, and earlier as the Senior Air Staff Officer of the South Western Air Command, Gandhinagar. He was also the first Director General of the Defence Space Agency in Bengaluru.

== Early life and education ==
He is an alumnus of Rashtriya Indian Military College, Dehradun. He then attended the National Defence Academy, Khadakwasla and the Air Force Academy, Dundigal. He is also an alumnus Defence Services Staff College, Wellington and USAF Air War College, Montgomery.

== Career ==
Air Marshal Dharkar was commissioned as a fighter pilot in the Indian Air Force on 14 June 1985 from the Air Force Academy, Dundigal. In a distinguished career spanning over 38 years, he has tenanted various staff and instructional appointments. He has flying experience of over 3,600 hours. He has flown various types of jet fighter and trainer aircraft and has significant experience in ground attack / strike roles, predominantly on the MiG-23 BN & MiG 27 aircraft. He has commanded a front line fighter squadron and a Fighter Flying Training Establishment. He has instructional experience in conducting professional military education for medium and senior level officers at the Defence Services Staff College and was directing staff at the College of Air Warfare, Secunderabad.

As Wing Commander, he has commanded the No. 18 squadron. He then took over as Air Officer Commanding of Air Force Station, Bidar. After being promoted to the rank of Air Vice Marshal, he served as Air Defence Commander at Eastern Air Command, Shillong, Assistant Chief of Air Staff at the Air Headquarters, New Delhi. He was later appointed as the first Director General of the Defence Space Agency.

After being promoted to the rank of Air Marshal, he assumed the appointment of Senior Air Staff Officer of South Western Air Command on 1 November 2021. A year later on 1 October 2022 Air Marshal Sujeet Pushpakar Dharkar took over as the Air Officer Commanding-in-Chief, Eastern Air Command succeeding Air Marshal Dilip Kumar Patnaik when the latter superannuated from service on 30 September 2022.

On 3 October 2024, Air Marshal Sujeet Pushpakar Dharkar took over as the 48th Vice Chief of the Air Staff succeeding Air Chief Marshal Amar Preet Singh upon his elevation as the Chief of Air Staff. He superannuated on 30 April 2025.

== Awards and decorations ==
The Air Officer has been awarded with the Param Vishisht Seva Medal in 2023, the Uttam Yudh Seva Medal in 2025 and the Ati Vishisht Seva Medal in 2014.

Param Vishisht Seva Medal		Uttam Yudh Seva Medal	
Ati Vishisht Seva Medal	Special Service Medal		Operation Vijay Medal
Operation Parakram Medal	Sainya Seva Medal	High Altitude Medal	75th Independence Anniversary Medal
50th Independence Anniversary Medal	30 Years Long Service Medal	20 Years Long Service Medal	9 Years Long Service Medal

== Dates of rank ==
Insignia	Rank	Component	Date of rank
	Pilot Officer	Indian Air Force	14 June 1985
	Flying Officer	Indian Air Force	14 June 1986
	Flight Lieutenant	Indian Air Force	14 June 1990
	Squadron Leader	Indian Air Force	14 June 1996
	Wing Commander	Indian Air Force	14 May 2002
	Group Captain	Indian Air Force	1 May 2008
	Air Commodore	Indian Air Force	1 February 2011
	Air Vice Marshal	Indian Air Force	2 January 2017
	Air Marshal	Indian Air Force	1 November 2021 (AOC-in-C from 1 July 2022)

Military offices
Preceded by Amar Preet Singh	Vice Chief of Air Staff; 3 October 2024 - 30 April 2025	Succeeded by Narmdeshwar Tiwari
Preceded by Dilip Kumar Patnaik	Air Officer Commanding-in-Chief, Eastern Air Command; 1 October 2022 – 30 September 2024	Succeeded by Surat Singh
Preceded by Sreekumar Prabhakaran	Senior Air Staff Officer - South Western Air Command; 1 November 2021 – 30 September 2022	Succeeded by Ashutosh Dixit
Preceded by Post Established	Director General - Defence Space Agency; 1 November 2019 – 9 June 2021	Succeeded by Dhananjay Vasant Khot
