= Surat Singh (air marshal) =

Air Marshal in Indian Air Force

Air Marshal Surat Singh PVSM AVSM VM VSM

Air Officer Commanding-in-Chief Eastern Air Command
- In office 1 October 2024 – 31 January 2026
- Chief of Air Staff: Amar Preet Singh
- Preceded by: Sujeet Pushpakar Dharkar
- Succeeded by: Inderpal Singh Walia

Military service
- Allegiance: India
- Branch/service: Indian Air Force
- Years of service: 6 December 1986 – 31 January 2026
- Rank: Air Marshal
- Unit: No. 223 Squadron
- Commands: Eastern Air Command; 2 Wing; TACDE; 505 Signal Unit; No. 223 Squadron
- Service number: 18563
- Awards: Param Vishisht Seva Medal; Ati Vishisht Seva Medal; Vayu Sena Medal; Vishisht Seva Medal

Air Marshal Surat Singh, PVSM, AVSM, VM, VSM is a retired air officer of the Indian Air Force. He last served as the Air Officer Commanding-in-Chief, Eastern Air Command. He previously served as the Director General Air (Operations).

== Early life and education ==
The air officer is an alumnus of the National Defence Academy, Khadakwasla and the Air Force Academy, Dundigal. He is also an alumnus of the Command and Staff College, Australia and National Defence College, Bangladesh.

== Military career ==
He was commissioned into the fighter stream of the Indian Air Force on 6 December 1986 from the Air Force Academy. In a career spanning over three decades, he has more than 2900 hours of flying experience across various fighter jets and has held training & staff appointments. He is a highly experienced fighter pilot and has flown various fighter aircraft of the Indian Air Force which include variants of the MiG-21, MiG-29 and Su- 30 MKI. The Air Marshal's operational tenures include being the Commanding Officer of a fighter squadron in the Northern Sector. As a Group Captain, he served as the Commandant of Tactics and Combat Development Establishment (TACDE) and as the station commander of 505 Signal Unit. As an Air Commodore, he served as the Air Officer Commanding of 2 Wing at Lohegaon and as Air Commodore (Offensive Operations). He has also served as Director at the Directorate of Air Staff Inspection (DASI) at the Air Headquarters, Air-1 at South Western Air Command, Principal Director at Directorate of Personnel (Officers) & Directorate of Operations (Offensive).

As an Air Vice Marshal, he assumed the appointment of Air Defence Commander, Easter Air Command and later served as the Assistant Chief of Air Staff, Operations (Space).

After being promoted to the rank of Air Marshal, on 1 January 2023 he assumed the appointment of Director General Air (Operations) at the Air Headquarters. On 1 October 2024, Air Marshal Surat Singh took over as the Air Officer Commanding-in-Chief, Eastern Air Command succeeding Air Marshal Sujeet Pushpakar Dharkar who moved to the Air Headquarters as the Vice Chief of the Air Staff. He superannuated on 31 January 2026 after serving for nearly four decades.

== Awards and decorations ==
During his career, the air marshal has been awarded the Param Vishisht Seva Medal in 2026, the Ati Vishisht Seva Medal in 2015, the Vishisht Seva Medal in 2011 and the Vayu Sena Medal in 2008.

Param Vishisht Seva Medal	Ati Vishisht Seva Medal	Vayu Sena Medal	Vishisht Seva Medal
Samanya Seva Medal	Special Service Medal	Operation Vijay Medal	Operation Parakram Medal
Sainya Seva Medal	High Altitude Medal	Videsh Seva Medal	75th Anniversary of Independence Medal
50th Independence Anniversary Medal	30 Years Long Service Medal	20 Years Long Service Medal	9 Years Long Service Medal

== Dates of ranks ==
Insignia	Rank	Component	Date of rank
	Pilot Officer	Indian Air Force	6 December 1986
	Flying Officer	Indian Air Force	6 December 1987
	Flight Lieutenant	Indian Air Force	6 December 1991
	Squadron Leader	Indian Air Force	6 December 1997
	Wing Commander	Indian Air Force	5 May 2003
	Group Captain	Indian Air Force	2 March 2009
	Air Commodore	Indian Air Force	17 June 2013
	Air Vice Marshal	Indian Air Force	11 June 2019
	Air Marshal	Indian Air Force	1 December 2022 (AOC-in-C from 1 October 2024)

Military offices
Preceded by Sujeet Pushpakar Dharkar	Air Officer Commanding-in-Chief; Eastern Air Command; 1 October 2024 – 31 January 2026	Succeeded by Inderpal Singh Walia
Preceded by Pankaj Mohan Sinha	Director General Air Operations; 1 January 2023 – 30 September 2024	Succeeded by Awadhesh Kumar Bharti
