= Tejinder Singh (air marshal) =

Indian Air Force air marshal

Air Marshal Tejinder Singh PVSM AVSM VM
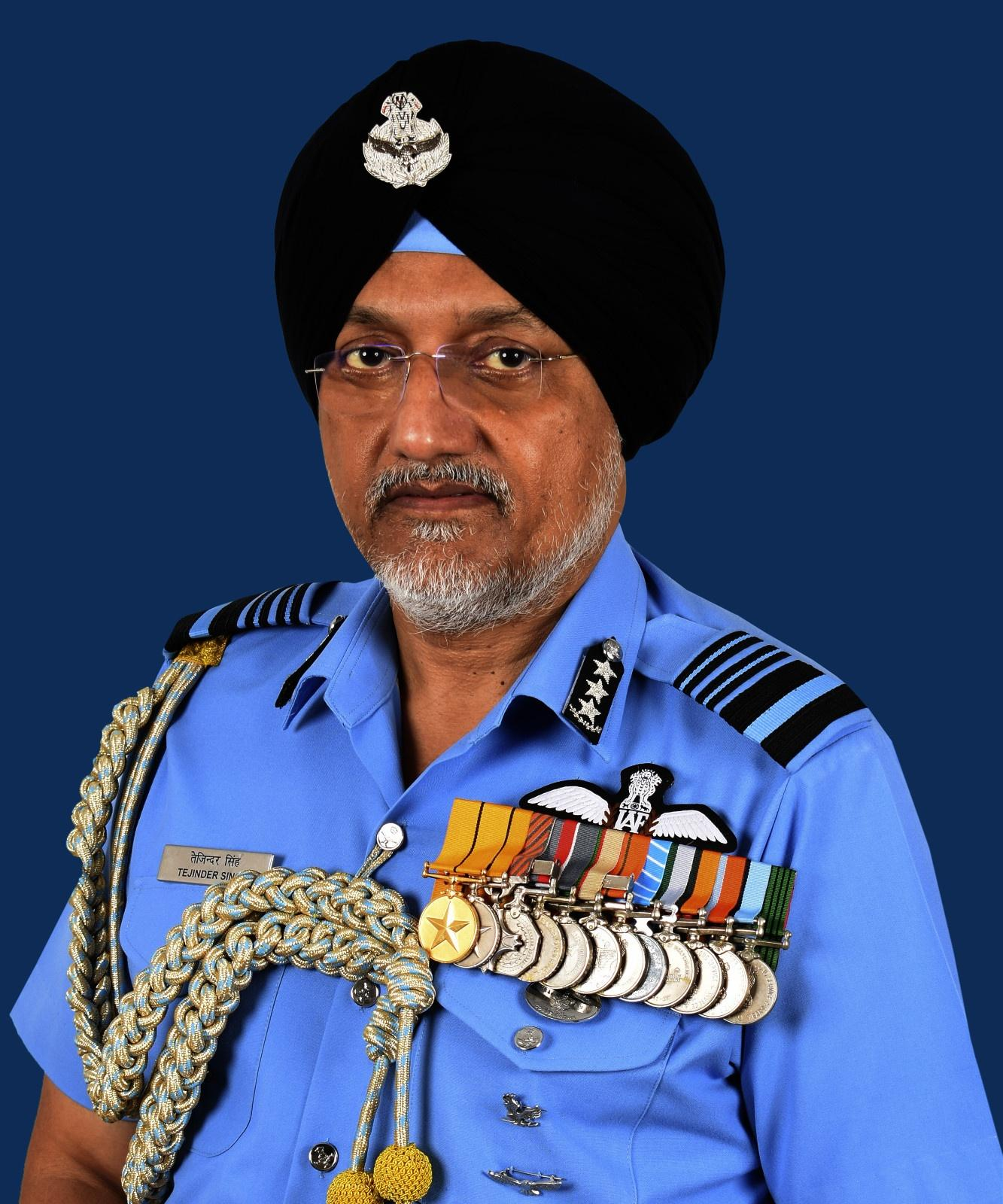
- Official portrait, 2026

Chief of Integrated Defence Staff
- Incumbent
- Assumed office 1 July 2026
- Chief of the Defence: N. S. Raja Subramani
- Preceded by: Ashutosh Dixit

Air Officer Commanding-in-Chief South Western Air Command
- In office 1 January 2026 – 30 June 2026
- Preceded by: Nagesh Kapoor
- Succeeded by: P. V. Shivanand

Air Officer Commanding-in-Chief Training Command
- In office 1 May 2025 – 31 December 2025
- Preceded by: Nagesh Kapoor
- Succeeded by: Seethepalli Shrinivas

Deputy Chief of the Air Staff
- In office 1 September 2024 – 30 April 2025
- Preceded by: Ashutosh Dixit
- Succeeded by: Awadhesh Kumar Bharti

Military service
- Allegiance: India
- Branch/service: Indian Air Force
- Years of service: 13 June 1987 – Present
- Rank: Air Marshal
- Unit: No. 5 Squadron
- Commands: Integrated Defence Staff; South Western Air Command; Training Command; 7 Wing; 47 Signal Unit; No. 5 Squadron
- Service number: 18806
- Awards: Param Vishisht Seva Medal; Ati Vishisht Seva Medal; Vayu Sena Medal

Air Marshal Tejinder Singh, PVSM, AVSM, VM is a serving officer of the Indian Air Force. He is currently serving as the Chief of Integrated Defence Staff. Previously, he served as the Air Officer Commanding-in-Chief, South Western Air Command, prior to that he was Air Officer Commanding-in-Chief, Training Command. He earlier served as the Deputy Chief of the Air Staff and as Senior Air Staff Officer, Eastern Air Command.

== Early life and education ==
The Air officer is an alumnus of the National Defence Academy, Khadakwasla and the Air Force Academy, Dundigal. He is also an alumnus of the Defence Services Staff College, Wellington and the National Defence College, New Delhi.

== Military career ==
He was commissioned into the fighter stream of the Indian Air Force on 13 June 1987 from the Air Force Academy. In a career spanning over three decades, he has more than 4500 hours of flying experience across various fighter jets and has held numerous staff & instructional appointments. He is a highly experienced fighter pilot, qualified flying instructor and a fighter combat leader who has flown the SEPECAT Jaguar, Hunter, Kiran and HPT-32 ac and also qualified as a 2nd pilot on Cheetah helicopter. He is a Category A qualified flying instructor. He has done instructional tenure as Flying Instructor at Flying Instructors School and has been Air Force Examiner at the Aircrew Examining Board. The Air Marshal's operational tenures include being the Commanding Officer of No. 5 Squadron, Station Commander of 47 Signal Unit, a radar station in the Western Sector.

As an Air Commodore, he served as the Air Officer Commanding of 7 Wing, Ambala, as the Principal Director Personnel Officer (PDPO) at Air Headquarters in New Delhi and later as the Principal Director of Aerospace Safety at the Air Headquarters, New Delhi.

As an Air Vice Marshal, he served as the Assistant Chief of Air Staff (Ops, Offensive) at the Air headquarters, New Delhi, as the Air Officer Commanding, Jammu and Kashmir and as the Assistant Chief of Air Staff (Ops, Strategy).

After being promoted to the rank of Air Marshal, on 22 May 2023 he took over as Senior Air Staff Officer of the Eastern Air Command at Shillong. A year later on 1 September 2024, he took over as the Deputy Chief of the Air Staff. On 1 May 2025, he took over as the Air Officer Commanding-in-Chief, Training Command succeeding Air Marshal Nagesh Kapoor who moved to South Western Air Command as Air Commander. On 1 January 2026, Air Marshal Tejinder Singh took over as the Air Officer Commanding-in-Chief, South Western Air Command succeeding Air Marshal Nagesh Kapoor upon his elevation as the Vice Chief of Air Staff.

On 1 July 2026, he assumed the appointment of Chief of Integrated Defence Staff succeeding Air Marshal Ashutosh Dixit upon his elevation as the Vice Chief of Air Staff.

== Awards and decorations ==
During his career, the air marshal has been awarded the Param Vishisht Seva Medal in 2026, the Ati Vishisht Seva Medal in 2022 and the Vayu Sena Medal in 2007.

Param Vishisht Seva Medal		Ati Vishisht Seva Medal	
Vayu Sena Medal	Special Service Medal		Siachen Glacier Medal
Operation Parakram Medal	Sainya Seva Medal	High Altitude Medal	75th Independence Anniversary Medal
50th Independence Anniversary Medal	30 Years Long Service Medal	20 Years Long Service Medal	9 Years Long Service Medal

== Dates of ranks ==
Insignia	Rank	Component	Date of rank
	Pilot Officer	Indian Air Force	13 June 1987
	Flying Officer	Indian Air Force	13 June 1988
	Flight Lieutenant	Indian Air Force	13 June 1992
	Squadron Leader	Indian Air Force	13 June 1998
	Wing Commander	Indian Air Force	11 May 2004
	Group Captain	Indian Air Force	14 December 2009
	Air Commodore	Indian Air Force	1 October 2013
	Air Vice Marshal	Indian Air Force	1 January 2020
	Air Marshal	Indian Air Force	1 April 2023 (AOC-in-C from 1 May 2025)

Military offices
Preceded by Ashutosh Dixit	Chief of Integrated Defence Staff; 1 July 2026 – Present	Succeeded by Incumbent
Preceded by Nagesh Kapoor	Air Officer Commanding-in-Chief; South Western Air Command; 1 January 2026 – 30 June 2026	Succeeded by P. V. Shivanand
Preceded by Nagesh Kapoor	Air Officer Commanding-in-Chief; Training Command; 1 May 2025 – 31 December 2025	Succeeded by Seethepalli Shrinivas
Preceded by Ashutosh Dixit	Deputy Chief of Air Staff; 1 September 2024 – 30 April 2025	Succeeded by Awadhesh Kumar Bharti
Preceded by Balakrishnan Manikantan	Senior Air Staff Officer; Eastern Air Command; 22 May 2023 – 31 August 2024	Succeeded by Inderpal Singh Walia
