= Jeetendra Mishra =

Air Officer Commanding-in-Chief Western Air Command (Retd.)

Air Marshal Jeetendra Mishra SYSM AVSM VSM
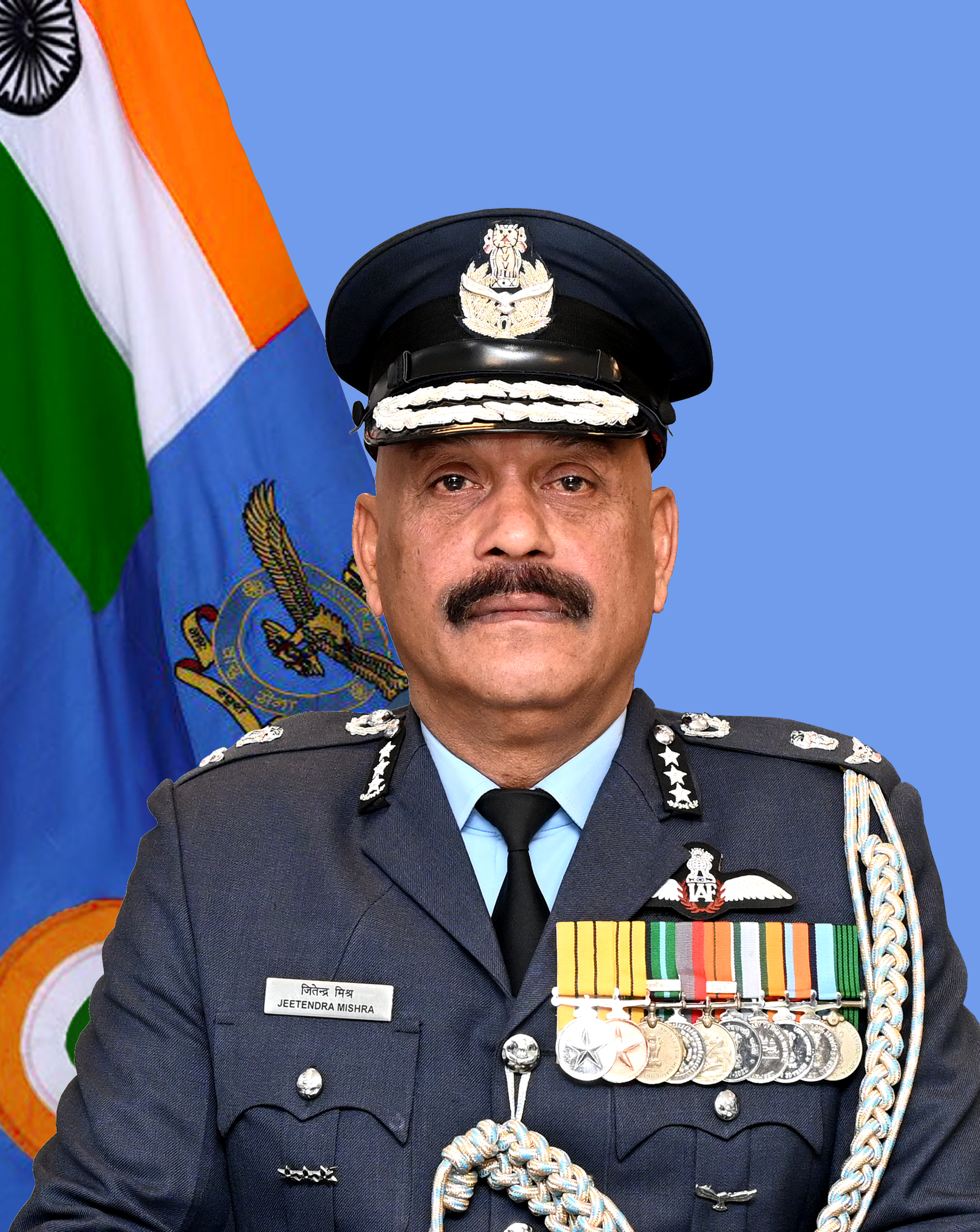

CEO of Shri Ram Janmbhoomi Teerth Kshetra
- Incumbent
- Assumed office 21 September 2026

Air Officer Commanding-in-Chief Western Air Command
- In office 1 January 2025 – 30 April 2026
- Preceded by: Pankaj Mohan Sinha
- Succeeded by: George Thomas

Military service
- Allegiance: India
- Branch/service: Indian Air Force
- Years of service: 6 December 1986 – 30 April 2026
- Rank: Air Marshal
- Commands: Western Air Command; Aircraft and Systems Testing Establishment; 18 Wing; 15 Wing; MOFTU
- Service number: 18575
- Awards: Sarvottam Yudh Seva Medal; Ati Vishisht Seva Medal; Vishisht Seva Medal

Air Marshal Jeetendra Mishra, SYSM, AVSM, VSM is a retired air officer of the Indian Air Force. He took charge as the CEO of the Shri Ram Janmbhoomi Teerth Kshetra trust in September 2025. He served as the Air Officer Commanding-in-Chief, Western Air Command. He previously served as the Deputy Chief of Integrated Defence Staff (Ops), prior to that he was Deputy Chief of Integrated Defence Staff (Doctrine, Organisation and Training) at the Integrated Defence Staff.

== Early life and education ==
Mishra is an alumnus of the National Defence Academy, Khadakwasla and the Air Force Academy, Dundigal. He is also an alumnus of the Air Force Test Pilots School, the Air Command and Staff College, Montgomery, Alabama and the Royal College of Defence Studies, United Kingdom.

== Military career ==
Mishra was commissioned into the fighter stream of the Indian Air Force on 6 December 1986 from the Air Force Academy. In a career spanning over 38 years, he has over 3000 hours of flying experience and has flown more than 18 types of fighter & transport aircraft and helicopters. He is a highly experienced fighter pilot, a fighter combat leader and an experimental test pilot and has held instructional & staff appointments. As a Squadron Leader, he was a part of the team that operationalized Laser-guided bombs on the Mirage 2000 aircraft at the start of the Kargil war which were then used during the famous attacks on Tiger Hill and Muntho Dhalo during Operation Safed Sagar. The Air Marshal's operational tenures include being the Commanding Officer of a fighter squadron in the Eastern Sector and being chief test pilot at the Hindustan Aeronautics Limited (Nasik Division) in the ranks of a Wing Commander. As a Group Captain, he served as the Chief Test Pilot at the Aircraft and Systems Testing Establishment and as the Director (Operational Planning and Assessment Group) at Air Headquarters, New Delhi. In Jun 2010, he was also selected to lead the Indian Air Force contingent for multinational air exercise Garuda IV in France.

As an Air Commodore, Mishra commanded the 15 Wing (AFS, Bareilly) and 18 Wing (AFS, Pathankot). Later, he held the appointment of Air Cmde (Air Staff Requirements) at Air Headquarters. As Air Vice Marshal, he served as the Assistant Chief of Air Staff (Projects) at Air Headquarters and as the Commandant of Aircraft and Systems Testing Establishment.

After being promoted to the rank of Air Marshal, on 9 January 2023, Mishra assumed the appointment of Deputy Chief of Integrated Defence Staff (Doctrine, Organisation and Training) at the Integrated Defence Staff. Later, on 5 December 2023 he assumed the appointment of Deputy Chief of Integrated Defence Staff (Operations). On 1 January 2025, Air Marshal Jeetendra Mishra took over as the Air Officer Commanding-in-Chief, Western Air Command succeeding Air Marshal Pankaj Mohan Sinha who superannuated on 31 December 2024.

In 2025 Air Marshal Mishra was awarded the Sarvottam Yudh Seva Medal by the President of India for his leadership of the Western Air Command during Operation Sindoor. He superannuated from the Indian Air Force on 30 April 2026 after over four decades in uniform.

== Awards and decorations ==
Mishra was awarded the Sarvottam Yudh Seva Medal on Independence Day 2025 for his role during Operation Sindoor, the Ati Vishisht Seva Medal in 2024 and the Vishisht Seva Medal in 2013.

Sarvottam Yudh Seva Medal	Ati Vishisht Seva Medal		Vishisht Seva Medal
Samanya Seva Medal	Special Service Medal	Sainya Seva Medal	75th Independence Anniversary Medal
50th Anniversary of Independence Medal	30 Years Long Service Medal	20 Years Long Service Medal	9 Years Long Service Medal

== Dates of ranks ==
Insignia	Rank	Component	Date of rank
	Pilot Officer	Indian Air Force	6 December 1986
	Flying Officer	Indian Air Force	6 December 1987
	Flight Lieutenant	Indian Air Force	6 December 1991
	Squadron Leader	Indian Air Force	6 December 1997
	Wing Commander	Indian Air Force	5 May 2003
	Group Captain	Indian Air Force	2 March 2009
	Air Commodore	Indian Air Force	17 June 2013
	Air Vice Marshal	Indian Air Force	11 June 2019
	Air Marshal	Indian Air Force	1 January 2023 (AOC-in-C from 1 January 2025)

== Post-retirement career ==
Mishra took over as the CEO of the Shri Ram Janmbhoomi Teerth Kshetra trust in September 2025. He was selected from 5,585 applicants.

Military offices
Preceded by Pankaj Mohan Sinha	Air Officer Commanding-in-Chief; Western Air Command; 1 January 2025 – 30 April 2026	Succeeded by George Thomas
Preceded by Sanjay Vatsayan	Deputy Chief of the Integrated Defence Staff (Operations); 5 December 2023 – 31 December 2024	Succeeded by Rakesh Sinha
Preceded by Sandesh Prabhakar Wagle	Deputy Chief of the Integrated Defence Staff (Doctrine, Organisation and Training); 9 January 2023 – 4 December 2023	Succeeded by Vipul Shinghal
