= Praveen Keshav Vohra =

Indian Air Force Air Marshal

Air Marshal Praveen Keshav Vohra UYSM AVSM VM
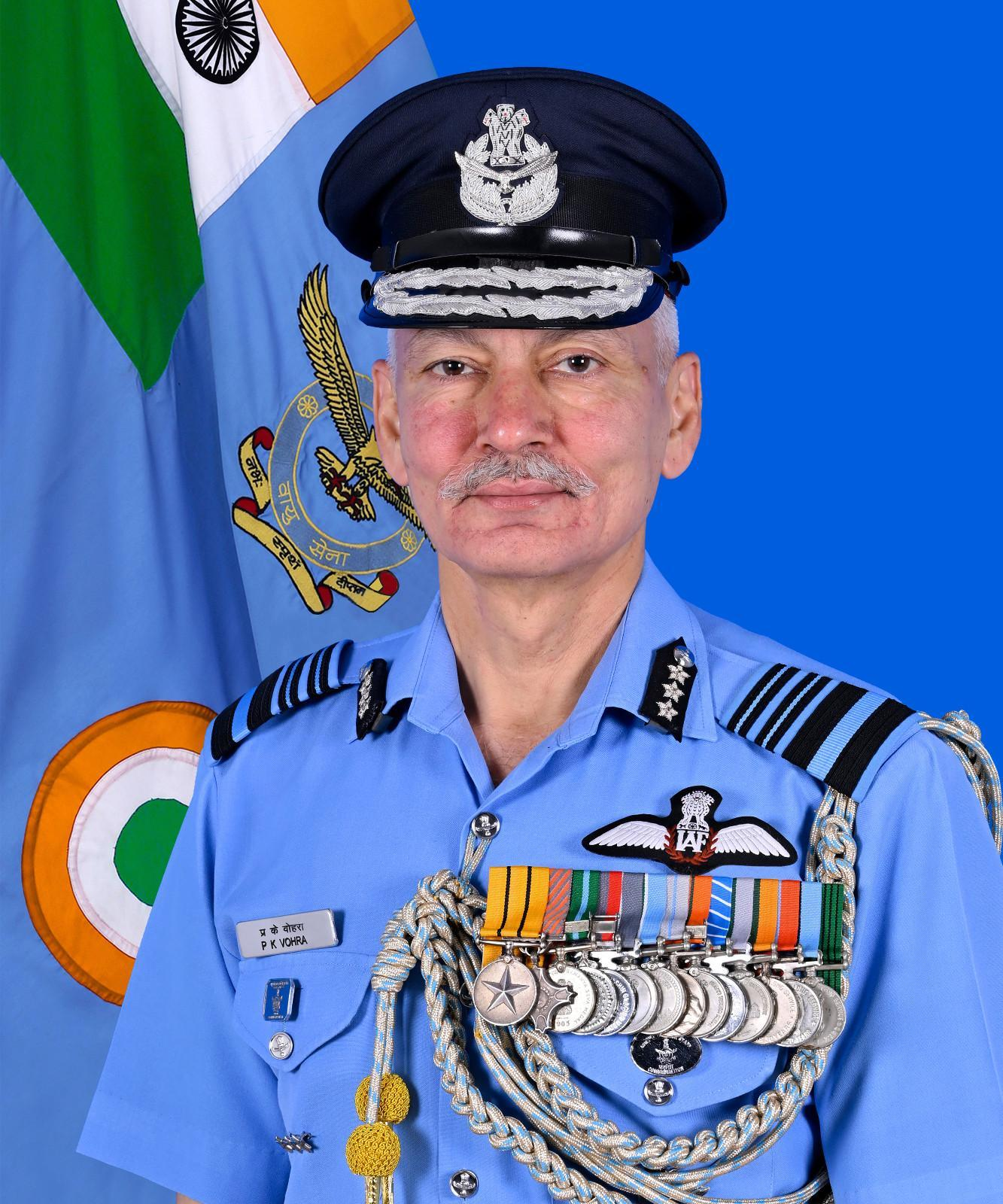

Military service
- Allegiance: India
- Branch/service: Indian Air Force
- Years of service: 19 December 1987 – 31 October 2026
- Rank: Air Marshal
- Unit: No. 47 Squadron
- Commands: Air Force Academy; 9 Wing; No. 47 Squadron
- Service number: 19162
- Awards: Uttam Yudh Seva Medal; Ati Vishisht Seva Medal; Vayu Sena Medal

Air Marshal Praveen Keshav Vohra, UYSM, AVSM, VM is a retired air officer of the Indian Air Force. He last served served as the Deputy Chief of Integrated Defence Staff (Policy Planning & Force Development). He earlier served as Commandant of the Air Force Academy and as Senior Air Staff Officer, Western Air Command.

== Early life and education ==
The Air marshal is an alumnus of the National Defence Academy, Khadakwasla and the Air Force Academy, Dundigal. He subsequently attended the Defence Services Staff College, Wellington and the Centre of Defence and Strategic Studies, Canberra, Australia.

== Military career ==
He was commissioned into the fighter stream of the Indian Air Force on 19 December 1987 from the Air Force Academy. In a career spanning over three decades, he has over 3500 hours of flying experience across various fighter jets and has tenanted various staff and instructional appointments. He is a highly experienced fighter pilot, qualified flying instructor and a fighter combat leader who has flown a variety of combat and trainer aircraft and has flown all variants of MiG-21 and the MiG-29. He is a category 'A' qualified flying instructor. He has served as a flying instructor at Flying Instructors School, Tambaram and was a founder member of the Indian Air Force's formation aerobatic team, the Suryakirans' flying the indigenous Kiran Mk-II aircraft. The Air Marshal's operational tenures include being the commanding officer of No. 47 Squadron at Adampur Air Force Station. As a Group Captain, he served as the Director of Joint Operations Planning, as the Director (Opl Plg and Assesstment) and later as the DPO-4 at the Air Headquarters, New Delhi.

As an Air Commodore, he served as the Air Officer Commanding of 9 Wing, Halwara, as the Air Assistant to the Chief of Air Staff and later as the Air Commodore (Opl Plg Assesstment and Strategy). As an Air Vice Marshal, he served as the Air Officer Commanding, Jammu and Kashmir and as the Assistant Chief of Air Staff (Ops, Strategy).

After getting promoted to the rank of Air Marshal, on 1 December 2023, he assumed the appointment of Senior Air Staff Officer, Western Air Command. Later on 1 June 2025, he took over as the Commandant of the Air Force Academy. On 10 March 2026, he assumed the appointment of Deputy Chief of Integrated Defence Staff (Policy Planning & Force Development) at the headquarters Integrated Defence Staff.

== Awards and decorations ==
During his career, the air marshal has been awarded the Uttam Yudh Seva Medal on Independence Day 2025 for his role during Operation Sindoor, the Ati Vishisht Seva Medal in 2017 and the Vayu Sena Medal in 2007.

Uttam Yudh Seva Medal		Ati Vishisht Seva Medal	
Vayu Sena Medal	Samanya Seva Medal	Siachen Glacier Medal	Operation Vijay Medal
Operation Parakram Medal	Sainya Seva Medal	High Altitude Medal	75th Independence Anniversary Medal
50th Independence Anniversary Medal	30 Years Long Service Medal	20 Years Long Service Medal	9 Years Long Service Medal

== Dates of ranks ==
Insignia	Rank	Component	Date of rank
	Pilot Officer	Indian Air Force	19 December 1987
	Flying Officer	Indian Air Force	19 December 1988
	Flight Lieutenant	Indian Air Force	19 December 1992
	Squadron Leader	Indian Air Force	19 December 1998
	Wing Commander	Indian Air Force	11 May 2004
	Group Captain	Indian Air Force	1 January 2010
	Air Commodore	Indian Air Force	1 December 2014
	Air Vice Marshal	Indian Air Force	1 January 2021
	Air Marshal	Indian Air Force	1 December 2023
