= Awadhesh Kumar Bharti =

Former Deputy Chief of the Air Staff, Indian Air Force

Air Marshal Awadhesh Kumar Bharti SYSM AVSM VM
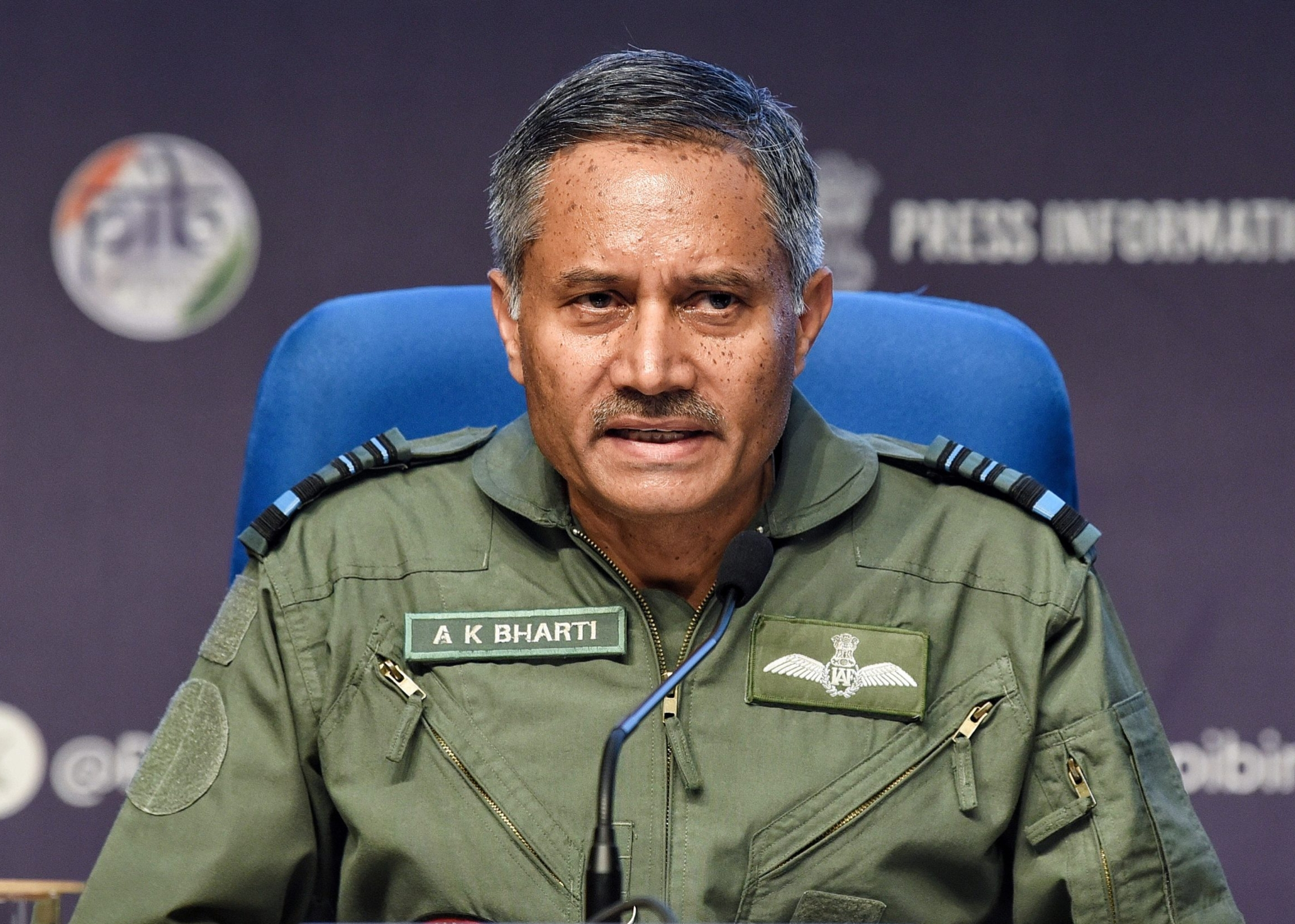
- Air Marshal Bharti during press briefing of Operation Sindoor

49th Deputy Chief of the Air Staff
- In office 1 June 2025 – 31 July 2026
- Chief of the Air Staff: Amar Preet Singh
- Preceded by: Tejinder Singh
- Succeeded by: Tejpal Singh

Director General Air Operations
- In office 1 October 2024 – 31 May 2025
- Chief of the Air Staff: Amar Preet Singh
- Preceded by: Surat Singh
- Succeeded by: George Thomas

Personal details
- Born: Purnea, Bihar
- Education: Indian Air Force Academy; National Defence Academy; Sainik School, Tilaiya
- Nickname: Galloping Horse

Military service
- Allegiance: India
- Branch/service: Indian Air Force
- Years of service: 13 June 1987 – 31 July 2026
- Rank: Air Marshal
- Unit: No. 30 Squadron
- Commands: 2 Wing; No. 24 Squadron; No. 30 Squadron; Advance HQ, Eastern Air Command
- Battles: Operation Vijay; Operation Parakram; Operation Sindoor
- Service number: 18781
- Awards: Sarvottam Yudh Seva Medal; Ati Vishisht Seva Medal; Vayu Sena Medal

Air Marshal Awadhesh Kumar Bharti, SYSM, AVSM, VM is a former senior officer of the Indian Air Force. He last served as the 49th Deputy Chief of the Air Staff. During Operation Sindoor, he was the face of the Indian Air Force as the Director General Air Operations. He was also the Commodore Commandant of No. 24 Squadron.

== Early life and education ==
Bharti was born in Purnia district of Bihar. His father is Jiwachh Lal Yadav, a retired govt personnel of Kosi Project and his mother is Urmila Devi. He is an alumnus of Sainik School, Tilaiya. He then attended the National Defence Academy, Khadakwasla and the Air Force Academy, Dundigal. He was awarded the Sword of Honour for standing first in overall merit in his course at the Air Force Academy. He is also an alumnus of the Defence Services Staff College, Wellington and the National Defence College, New Delhi. During his NDA days, Air Marshal Bharti was nicknamed ‘Galloping Horse’, as his cross country record there remained unbroken for many years.

== Military career ==
Bharti was commissioned as a fighter pilot in the Indian Air Force on 13 June 1987 from the Air Force Academy. In a career spanning over three decades, he had more than 5000 hours of flying experience across various fighter jets and had held numerous field and staff appointments. He was a highly experienced combat fighter pilot and has flown different types of aircraft including SU-30MKI and SU-30MKM. He had led and been a part of many air exercises including Gagan Shakti, Garuda and Indradhanush. He has been Flight Commander of a Sukhoi-30 fighter squadron, No. 24 Squadron, and Commanding Officer of a Sukhoi-30MKI fighter squadron, No. 30 Squadron. He was awarded ‘Three Stars’ for accident-free flying. The air marshal’s operational tenures included being Air Officer Commanding of a frontline fighter air base, in Lohagaon, under South Western Air Command. His staff appointments included Air Attaché with Royal Malaysian Air Force where he trained Malaysian fighter pilots on SU-30 MKM.

As an air vice marshal, Bharti served as the Chief Staff Officer (Air Vector Strategy) in Strategic Forces Command and later as Assistant Chief of Air Staff, Offensive Operations at IAF Headquarters. He also served as Air Officer Commanding of Advanced HQ, Eastern Air Command.

After being promoted to the rank of air marshal, Bharti was appointed as the Senior Air Staff Officer, Central Air Command. A year later, on 3 October 2024, he assumed the appointment of Director General Air Operations (DGAO). As the DGAO, he played a vital role in India's Operation Sindoor. On 1 June 2025, Bharti took over as the Deputy Chief of the Air Staff with responsibilities of overseeing defense innovation in collaboration with industry and academia and indigenisation efforts besides long-term strategic planning and leadership of defense personnel.

== Personal life ==
Bharti is married to Wing Commander Sangeeta Malla (Retd). The couple has two children. His hobbies include reading, swimming, playing golf and walking.

== Awards and decorations ==
During his career, Bharti was awarded the Sarvottam Yudh Seva Medal on Independence Day 2025, the Ati Vishisht Seva Medal in 2024 and the Vayu Sena Medal in 2008. He also received commendations from the Chief of Air Staff.

Sarvottam Yudh Seva Medal		Ati Vishisht Seva Medal	
Vayu Sena Medal	Samanya Seva Medal		Operation Vijay Medal
Operation Parakram Medal	Sainya Seva Medal	Videsh Seva Medal	75th Anniversary of Independence Medal
50th Independence Anniversary Medal	30 Years Long Service Medal	20 Years Long Service Medal	9 Years Long Service Medal

== Dates of ranks ==
Insignia	Rank	Component	Date of rank
	Pilot Officer	Indian Air Force	13 June 1987
	Flying Officer	Indian Air Force	13 June 1988
	Flight Lieutenant	Indian Air Force	13 June 1992
	Squadron Leader	Indian Air Force	13 June 1998
	Wing Commander	Indian Air Force	11 May 2004
	Group Captain	Indian Air Force	1 June 2009 (acting 13 Sep 2010)
	Air Commodore	Indian Air Force	17 June 2013
	Air Vice Marshal	Indian Air Force	4 December 2019
	Air Marshal	Indian Air Force	1 September 2023

Military offices
Preceded by Tejinder Singh	Deputy Chief of Air Staff; 1 June 2025 – 31 July 2026	Succeeded by Tejpal Singh
Preceded by Surat Singh	Director General Air Operations; 1 October 2024 - 30 May 2025	Succeeded by George Thomas
Preceded by Nagesh Kapoor	Senior Air Staff Officer, Central Air Command; 1 September 2023 – 30 September 2024	Succeeded by George Thomas
