= George Thomas (air marshal) =

Air Marshal in the Indian Air Force

Air Marshal George Thomas AVSM VM
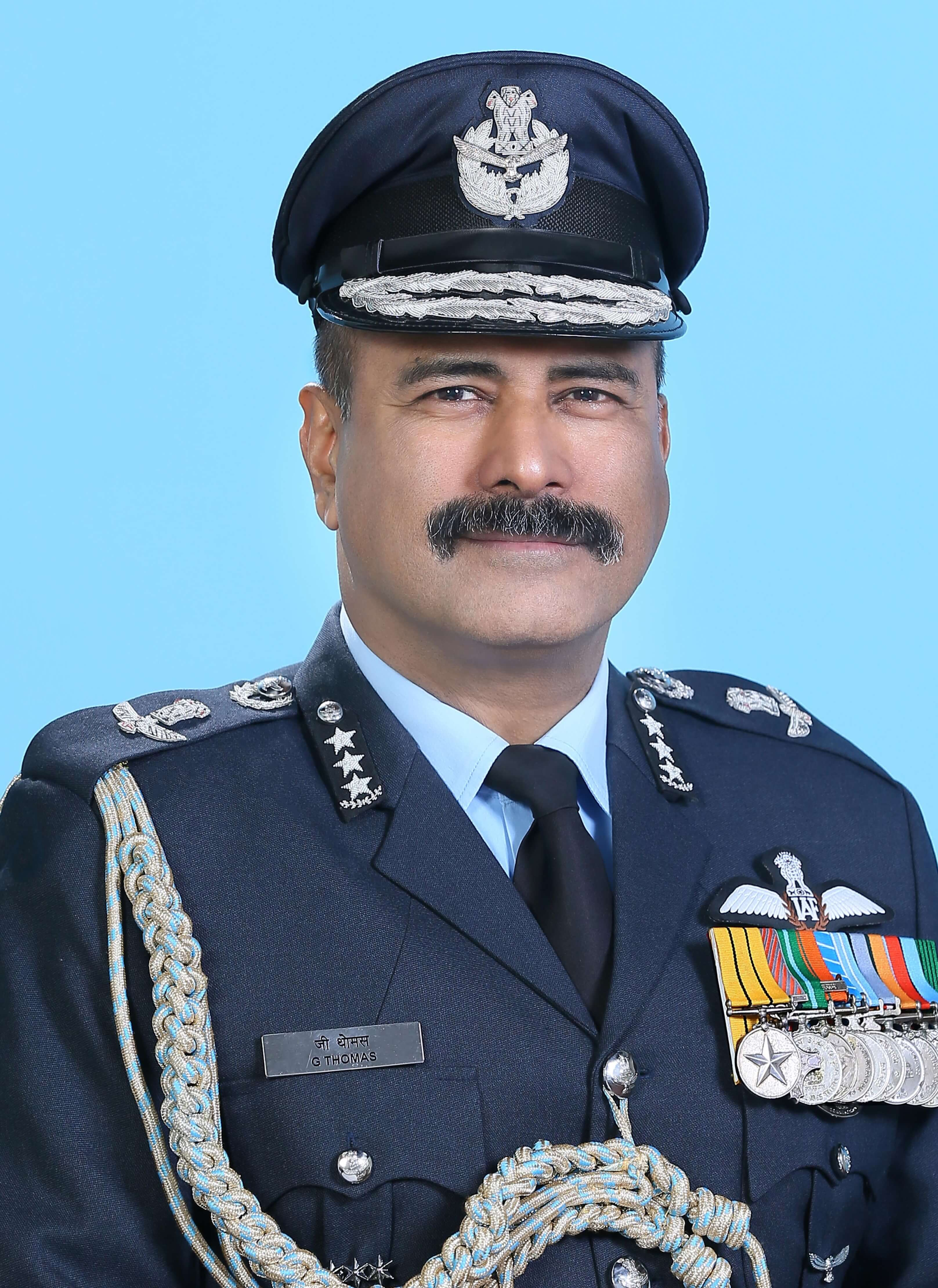
- Official Portrait, 2026

Air Officer Commanding-in-Chief Western Air Command
- Incumbent
- Assumed office 1 May 2026
- Chief of Air Staff: Amar Preet Singh
- Preceded by: Jeetendra Mishra

Military service
- Allegiance: India
- Branch/service: Indian Air Force
- Years of service: 14 June 1989 - Present
- Rank: Air Marshal
- Unit: No. 20 Squadron
- Commands: Western Air Command; 14 Wing; No. 20 Squadron
- Service Number: 20118
- Awards: Ati Vishisht Seva Medal; Vayu Sena Medal

Air Marshal George Thomas, AVSM, VM is a serving air officer of the Indian Air Force. He is currently serving as the Air Officer Commanding-in-Chief, Western Air Command. He previously served as the Director General Air Operations, and prior to that he was Senior Air Staff Officer, Central Air Command. He is also the Commodore Commandant of No. 20 Squadron.

== Early life and education ==
The air officer is an alumnus of the 74th Course of the National Defence Academy, Khadakwasla and the Air Force Academy, Dundigal. He is also an alumnus of National Defence College, New Delhi.

== Military career ==
He was commissioned into the fighter stream of the Indian Air Force on 14 June 1989 from the Air Force Academy. In a career spanning over three decades, he has over 9000 hours of flying experience including more than 3,600 hours as an instructor across various fighter jets on both fixed-wing and rotary-wing aircraft. He has held various command, staff & instructional appointments. The air marshal's operational tenures include being the Commanding Officer of No. 20 Squadron. He has served as Chief Test Pilot at Aircraft and Systems Testing Establishment and was Defence Attaché at the Embassy of India in Israel.

As an Air Commodore, he served as Air Assistant to the Chief of Air Satff, as the Air Officer Commanding of 14 Wing, Chabua, Assam and as Air Cmde (Opl Plg Assesstment and Strategy) at the Air headquarters, New Delhi. As an Air Vice Marshal, he served as the Assistant Chief of Air Staff, Projects and as the Assistant Chief of Air Staff, Plans.

After getting promoted to the rank of Air Marshal on 1 October 2024, he assumed the appointment of Senior Air Staff Officer, Central Air Command. After his stint as SASO, Central Air Command, on 1 June 2025 he assumed the appointment of the Director General Air Operations at the Air Headquarters. On 1 May 2026, Air Marshal George Thomas took over as the Air Officer Commanding-in-Chief, Western Air Command succeeding Air Marshal Jeetendra Mishra who superannuated on 30 April 2026.

== Awards and decorations ==
During his career, the air marshal has been awarded the Ati Vishisht Seva Medal in 2019 and the Vayu Sena Medal in 2010. He has also received commendations from the Chief of Air Staff.

Ati Vishisht Seva Medal	Vayu Sena Medal		Samanya Seva Medal
Sainya Seva Medal	High Altitude Medal	Videsh Seva Medal	75th Independence Anniversary Medal
50th Independence Anniversary Medal	30 Years Long Service Medal	20 Years Long Service Medal	9 Years Long Service Medal

== Date of ranks ==
Insignia	Rank	Component	Date of rank
	Pilot Officer	Indian Air Force	14 June 1989
	Flying Officer	Indian Air Force	14 June 1990
	Flight Lieutenant	Indian Air Force	14 June 1994
	Squadron Leader	Indian Air Force	14 June 1996
	Wing Commander	Indian Air Force	16 December 2004
	Group Captain	Indian Air Force	21 January 2011
	Air Commodore	Indian Air Force	1 March 2016
	Air Vice Marshal	Indian Air Force	1 June 2022
	Air Marshal	Indian Air Force	1 October 2024

Military offices
Preceded by Jeetendra Mishra	Air Officer Commanding-in-Chief Western Air Command; 1 June 2026 – Present	Incumbent
Preceded by Awadhesh Kumar Bharti	Director General Air Operations; 1 June 2025 – 30 Apr 2026	Succeeded by Joseph Suares
Preceded by Awadhesh Kumar Bharti	Senior Air Staff Officer, Central Air Command; 1 October 2024 – 31 May 2025	Succeeded by P. V. Shivanand
