= P. V. Shivanand =

Indian Air Force air marshal

Air Marshal P. V. Shivanand AVSM VM
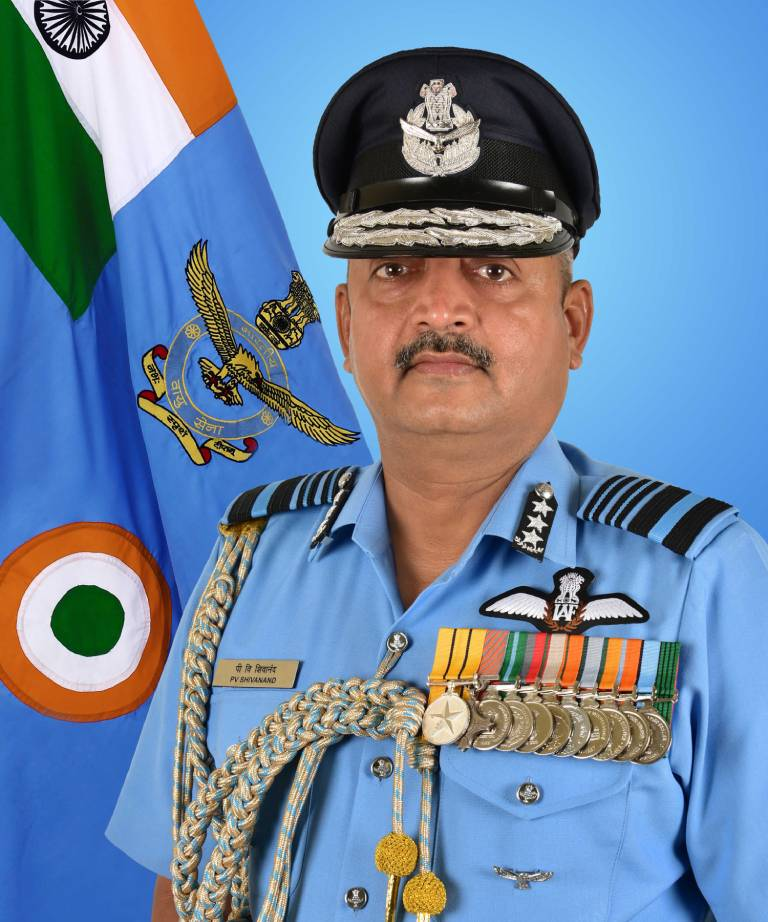
- Official Portrait, 2026

Air Officer Commanding-in-Chief South Western Air Command
- Incumbent
- Assumed office 1 July 2026
- Chief of Air Staff: Amar Preet Singh
- Preceded by: Tejinder Singh

Military service
- Allegiance: India
- Branch/service: Indian Air Force
- Years of service: 17 December 1988 - Present
- Rank: Air Marshal
- Unit: No. 32 Squadron
- Commands: South Western Air Command; 14 Wing; No. 50 Squadron; No. 32 Squadron
- Service Number: 19901
- Awards: Ati Vishisht Seva Medal; Vayu Sena Medal

Air Marshal Palaparthy Venkat Shivanand, AVSM, VM is a serving air officer of the Indian Air Force. He is currently serving as the Air Officer Commanding-in-Chief, South Western Air Command. He previously served as Senior Air Staff Officer, Central Air Command.

== Early life and education ==
He is an alumnus of the 73rd Course of the National Defence Academy, Khadakwasla and the Air Force Academy, Dundigal. He is also an alumnus of Tactics and Air Combat Development Establishment and Defence Services Staff College, Wellington.

== Military career ==
The air officer was commissioned into the fighter stream of the Indian Air Force on 17 December 1988 from the Air Force Academy. In a career spanning over three decades, he has over 2800 hours of flying experience on MiG-21 and the IL-76 AWACS and has held various command & staff appointments. The Air Marshal's operational tenures include being the Commanding Officer of No. 32 Squadron (Thunderbirds) at Jodhpur and later served as Commanding Officer of No. 50 Squadron (Adwitiya) at Agra. As an Air Commodore, he served as Air Attaché at the Embassy of India, Washington, D.C., USA and later as the Air Officer Commanding of 14 Wing, Chabua, Assam.

As an Air Vice Marshal, he served as the Air Officer Commanding of 14 Wing, Chabua and later as the Assistant Chief of Air Staff, Air Defence at the Air Headquarters, New Delhi. After getting promoted to the rank of Air Marshal, on 1 June 2025, he assumed the appointment of Senior Air Staff Officer, Central Air Command. On 1 July 2026, Air Marshal Shivanand took over as the Air Officer Commanding-in-Chief, South Western Air Command succeeding Air Marshal Tejinder Singh who moved to Integrated Defence Staff as CISC.

== Awards and decorations ==
During his career, he has been awarded with the Ati Vishisht Seva Medal in 2025 and the Vayu Sena Medal in 2014.

Ati Vishisht Seva Medal	Vayu Sena Medal	Samanya Seva Medal	Special Service Medal
Operation Parakram Medal	Sainya Seva Medal	Videsh Seva Medal	75th Independence Anniversary Medal
50th Independence Anniversary Medal	30 Years Long Service Medal	20 Years Long Service Medal	9 Years Long Service Medal

== Date of ranks ==
Insignia	Rank	Component	Date of rank
	Pilot Officer	Indian Air Force	17 December 1988
	Flying Officer	Indian Air Force	17 December 1989
	Flight Lieutenant	Indian Air Force	17 December 1993
	Squadron Leader	Indian Air Force	17 December 1995
	Wing Commander	Indian Air Force	16 December 2004
	Group Captain	Indian Air Force	6 July 2010
	Air Commodore	Indian Air Force	13 February 2017
	Air Vice Marshal	Indian Air Force	2 November 2021
	Air Marshal	Indian Air Force	1 June 2025 (AOC-in-C from 1 July 2026)

Military offices
Preceded by Tejinder Singh	Air Officer Commanding-in-Chief South Western Air Command; 1 July 2026 - Present	Incumbent
Preceded by George Thomas	Senior Air Staff Officer, Central Air Command; 1 June 2025 – 30 June 2026	Succeeded by n/a
