= Commandant of the Air Force Academy (India) =

Head of the Air Force Academy in India

- Incumbent; Air Marshal; Rahul Bhasin since June 2025
- Reports to: Air Officer Commanding-in-Chief, Training Command
- Seat: Dundigal, Hyderabad, Telangana, India
- Website: indianairforce.nic.in/air-force-academy/

The Commandant of the Air Force Academy is the head and in-charge of all the functioning of the Air Force Academy in India. The Commandant of the Academy is a Three-star rank officer holding the rank of Air marshal. He is supported by the Deputy Commandant, a Two star appointment, the Chief Instructor (Flying) (Air Commodore rank officer) and the Chief Ground Instructor (Air Commodore rank officer). The current Commandant is Air Marshal Praveen Keshav Vohra.

== History ==
The foundation stone of the Air Force Academy was laid by the then President of India Dr. Zakir Hussain on 11 October 1967. The academy was established in 1969 and started operations in 1971. The vision was to concentrate most of the ab-initio officer training of the Indian Air Force under one roof. Air Commodore J. D. Aquino, the commandant of the Air Force Flying College Jodhpur, was the first Commandant of the academy.

The appointment was held by an Air commodore till 1976, when it was upgraded to two-star rank. It was further upgraded to three-star rank in 2011.

== List of Commandants ==
S.No	Name	Appointment Date	Left Office	Notes
1	Air commodore J. D. Aquino, AVSM	8 March 1970	28 June 1972	First commandant.
2	Air commodore Lakshman Madhav Katre, AVSM	16 November 1972	26 December 1975	Later Chief of the Air Staff.
3	Air Vice Marshal H. R. Chitnis, AVSM, VM	5 January 1976 (Note: Appointed as an Air Commodore, promoted to the rank of air vice marshal on 1 April 1976.)	2 May 1977	Later Air Officer Commanding-in-Chief Training Command and Air Officer Commanding-in-Chief Maintenance Command.
4	Air Vice Marshal Trilochan Singh Brar, AVSM	3 May 1978	14 August 1978	Later Vice Chief of the Air Staff
5	Air Vice Marshal Balwant Wickram Chauhan, AVSM	14 August 1978	23 October 1979	Later Air Officer Commanding-in-Chief Training Command and Air Officer Commanding-in-Chief Central Air Command.
6	Air Vice Marshal Terence Joseph Desa	24 October 1979	6 April 1981	Later Air Officer Commanding-in-Chief Southern Air Command.
7	Air Vice Marshal Rajagopal Sriramulu Naidu, VM	13 April 1981	25 June 1983	Later Air Officer Commanding-in-Chief Southern Air Command.
8	Air Vice Marshal Cecil Vivian Parker, MVC, VM	1 July 1983	20 March 1985	
9	Air Vice Marshal Jagdish Kumar Seth, AVSM, VM	25 March 1985	7 February 1986	Later Air Officer Commanding-in-Chief Training Command.
10	Air Vice Marshal Har Krishan Oberai, AVSM, VM	22 March 1986	30 December 1987	
11	Air Vice Marshal Eric Lionel Allen, AVSM, VM	19 January 1988	28 February 1990	
12	Air Vice Marshal Manjunath Sadanand, AVSM	5 March 1990	30 November 1991	
13	Air Vice Marshal P. K. Mani, VM	2 December 1991	30 September 1993	
14	Air Vice Marshal Krishnan Narayan Nair, VM	1 October 1993	20 December 1995	Later Air Officer Commanding-in-Chief Southern Air Command and Air Officer Commanding-in-Chief Eastern Air Command.
15	Air Vice Marshal M. B. Madon, VM & bar	21 December 1995	17 August 1998	Later Air Officer Commanding-in-Chief Eastern Air Command.
16	Air Vice Marshal Jogendra Singh Sisodia, AVSM, VM	18 August 1998	31 July 2000	
16	Air Vice Marshal Subhash Bhojwani, AVSM, VSM	1 August 2000	5 June 2002	Later Air Officer Commanding-in-Chief Training Command.
17	Air Vice Marshal Vinod Kumar Verma, VM, VSM	1 July 2002	11 January 2004	Later Inspector General of Flight Safety.
18	Air Vice Marshal Yashwant Rao Rane, AVSM, VM	12 January 2004	31 August 2005	Later Air Officer Commanding-in-Chief Southern Air Command.
19	Air Vice Marshal Dhiraj Kukreja, AVSM, VSM	1 September 2005	29 February 2008	Later Air Officer Commanding-in-Chief Training Command.
20	Air Vice Marshal K. J. Mathews, AVSM, YSM	1 March 2008	31 August 2009	Later Commander-in-Chief, Strategic Forces Command.
21	Air Vice Marshal Amit Aneja, AVSM, VM, VSM	1 September 2009	31 March 2011	
22	Air Marshal Priya Ranjan Sharma, AVSM	1 April 2011	31 December 2012	
23	Air Marshal R. G. Burli, VM	1 January 2013	30 June 2014	
24	Air Marshal Gurinder Pal Singh, VM	1 July 2014	30 November 2016	
25	Air Marshal Amit Tiwari, VM	1 December 2016	3 September 2018	Later Air Officer Commanding-in-Chief Southern Air Command and Air Officer Commanding-in-Chief Central Air Command.
26	Air Marshal Arvindra Singh Butola, VM, VSM	4 September 2018	13 October 2019	Later Air Officer Commanding-in-Chief Training Command.
27	Air Marshal Jonnalagedda Chalapati, VSM	14 October 2019	31 July 2020	Current Air Officer Commanding-in-Chief Southern Air Command.
28	Air Marshal Vipin Indira Panabhan Nayar, AVSM, VM	1 August 2020	31 July 2021	Earlier Commandant of the National Defence Academy.
29	Air Marshal Sanjeev Kapoor, AVSM, VM	1 August 2021	31 October 2021	Later Commandant of the National Defence Academy.
30	Air Marshal Sreekumar Prabhakaran, AVSM, VM	1 November 2021	28 February 2022	Later Air Officer Commanding-in-Chief Western Air Command.
31	Air Marshal B Chandra Sekhar, AVSM	1 March 2022	31 August 2023	
32	Air Marshal Seethepalli Shrinivas, VSM	1 September 2023	31 May 2025	Current Air Officer Commanding-in-Chief Training Command
33	Air Marshal Praveen Keshav Vohra, AVSM, VM	1 June 2025	8 March 2026	
34	Air Marshal Rahul Bhasin, VM	9 March 2026	Incumbent	Current Commandant

== See also ==
- Commandant of the Indian Military Academy
- Commandant of Indian Naval Academy

== Bibliography ==
- Sondhi, Aditya (2015), The Order of the Crest: Tracing the Alumni of Bishop Cotton Boys’ School, Bangalore (1865–2015), Penguin Viking, ISBN 978-0670088003
