= Director General Air Operations =

Senior Appointment in the Indian Navy

Director General of Air Operations
- Flag of an Air Marshal
- Incumbent; Air Marshal Joseph Suares; YSM VM since 1 May 2026
- Indian Air Force
- Type: Director General
- Abbreviation: DGAO
- Reports to: Vice Chief of the Air Staff
- Seat: Air Headquarters, New Delhi
- First holder: Air Marshal Dinesh Chandra Kumaria

The Director General Air Operations (DGAO) is a senior appointment in the Indian Air Force. The DGAO is responsible for planning, executing, and overseeing all operational aspects of the Indian Air Force. The office is held by a three star officer in the rank of Air Marshal. The current DGAO is Air Marshal Joseph Suares who took over on 1 May 2026.

== History ==
At the time of independence of India, on 15 August 1947, Group Captain Mehar Singh was appointed the head of the operations directorate at Air headquarters and designated Group Captain (Operations).

Around 1962, the directorate was split into two separate entities: the Directorate of Transport & Maritime and the Directorate of Fighters & Bombers. In July 1970, a new post of Assistant Chief of the Air Staff (Operations) (ACAS (Ops)) was created, with the rank of Air Vice Marshal. Directorates, including Air Defence, Offensive Operations, Transport & Maritime reported into the ACAS (Ops). In 2009, this role was elevated to three-star rank and re-designated Director General (Air Operations). Air Marshal Dinesh Chandra Kumaria took over as the first DGAO on 12 March 2009.

== Appointees ==
S.No.	Name	Assumed office	Left office	Notes
1	Air Marshal Dinesh Chandra Kumaria AVSM VM VSM	12 March 2009	30 June 2009	Later served as Vice Chief of the Air Staff.
2	Air Marshal Anjan Gogoi AVSM VSM	1 July 2009	31 December 2010	Later served as Air Officer Commanding-in-Chief South Western Air Command.
3	Air Marshal Daljit Singh AVSM VM	1 January 2011	28 February 2013	Later served as Air Officer Commanding-in-Chief South Western Air Command.
4	Air Marshal Shirish Baban Deo AVSM VM VSM	1 March 2013	31 December 2014	Later served as Vice Chief of the Air Staff.
5	Air Marshal Anil Khosla AVSM VM	12 January 2015	21 August 2016	Later served as Vice Chief of the Air Staff.
6	Air Marshal Harjit Singh Arora AVSM	22 August 2016	30 September 2018	Later served as Vice Chief of the Air Staff.
7	Air Marshal Amit Dev VSM	1 October 2018	31 October 2018	Later served as Air Officer Commanding-in-Chief Western Air Command.
8	Air Marshal Balabhadra Radha Krishna AVSM SC	1 November 2018	30 June 2021	Later served as Air Officer Commanding-in-Chief Western Air Command.
9	Air Marshal Pankaj Mohan Sinha AVSM VSM	1 July 2021	31 December 2022	Later served as Air Officer Commanding-in-Chief Western Air Command.
10	Air Marshal Surat Singh AVSM VM VSM	1 January 2023	30 September 2024	Later served as Air Officer Commanding-in-Chief Eastern Air Command.
11	Air Marshal Awadhesh Kumar Bharti AVSM VM	1 October 2024	31 May 2025	Later Deputy Chief of the Air Staff.
12	Air Marshal George Thomas AVSM VM	1 June 2025	30 April 2026	Current Air Officer Commanding-in-Chief Western Air Command.
13	Air Marshal Joseph Suares YSM VM	1 May 2026	Present	Current DGAO.

== See also ==
- Director General of Military Operations
- Director General Naval Operations
