= Venkataraman Ramamurthy Iyer =

Air Marshal Venkataraman Ramamurthy Iyer PVSM, AVSM
- Military career
- Allegiance: India
- Branch: Indian Air Force
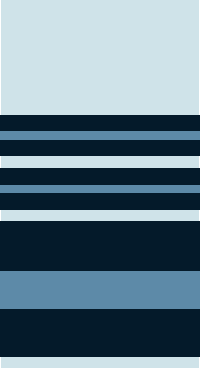
- Rank: Air Marshal
- Unit: Training Command (India)
- Awards: Param Vishisht Seva Medal; Ati Vishisht Seva Medal

Air Marshal Venkataraman Ramamurthy Iyer, PVSM, AVSM, is a retired Three-Star Air Marshal of the Indian Air Force. His final assignment with the Air Force was as Air Officer Commanding in Chief of the Indian Air Force Training Command.
