= E. P. R. Nair =

Air Marshal Erasseri Pathayapurayil Radhakrishnan Nair (born 28 June 1928) was the Commander-in Chief of the Training Command, IAF from 20 September 1981 to 28 February 1985. He was commissioned into the IAF on 12 April 1950. He received the Vishisht Seva Medal on 26 January 1969, Ati Vishisht Seva Medal on 26 January 1978 and Param Vishisht Seva Medal on 26 January 1984.
