= No. 30 Squadron IAF =

No. 30 Squadron Rhinos
- Active: 1 November 1969 – December 2002; May 2004 – present
- Country: Republic of India
- Allegiance: Indian Armed Forces
- Branch: Indian Air Force
- Role: Fighter
- Garrison/HQ: Lohegaon AFS
- Nickname: "Rhinos"
- Mottos: Aseema Paurusha; Boundless Valor जान से शान से ध्यान से

Commanders
- Notable commanders: Awadhesh Kumar Bharti

Aircraft flown
- Fighter: Sukhoi Su-30 MKI (present); MIG-21 (Historical)

No. 30 Squadron nicknamed as Rhinos is a fighter squadron and is equipped with Su-30MKI and based at Lohegaon Air Force Station as part of South Western Air Command.

It was the Presidential standards on 10 November 2016.

== Assignments ==
- Indo-Pakistani War of 1965
- Indo-Pakistani War of 1971

== Aircraft ==
Aircraft	From	To	Air Base
MiG-21 FL	1 November 1967	December 2002	
Sukhoi Su-30 MKI	May 2004	Present	AFS Lohegaon
