= No. 24 Squadron IAF =

No. 24 Squadron Hawks
- Insignia of The No. 24 Squadron IAF "Hawks"
- Active: 16 February 1962- Present
- Country: Republic of India
- Allegiance: Indian Armed Forces
- Branch: Indian Air Force
- Role: Fighter
- Garrison/HQ: Bareilly AFS
- Nickname: "Hawks"
- Mottos: Navijitya Nivartanam; No return without Conquest

Commanders
- Notable commanders: Awadhesh Kumar Bharti

Insignia
- Identification symbol: A Flying Hawk

Aircraft flown
- Fighter: Sukhoi Su-30MKI

No. 24 Squadron IAF nicknamed as Hawks is an air defence squadron of the Indian Air Force, operating from Bareilly AFS.

== History ==
The squadron was raised at AFS Chabua on 16 February 1962 as an Air Defence and Reconnaissance unit.

=== Indo-China War of 1962 ===
During the 1962 Indo-China War, the squadron, equipped with Vampires, was tasked to fly combat air patrols over Assam. Alongside these, the squadron had to fly recon missions in some of the narrowest and most treacherous valleys in the area, to facilitate the supply drops carried out by Dakotas. The squadron also carried out COIN operations in the north-east.

=== Indo-Pakistan War of 1965 ===
The squadron saw considerable action during this war. It operated from AFS Kalaikhunda, in West Bengal, tasked with providing close air support to the ground units in the Eastern Sector. It continued for the first few days of the war and then relocated to Barrackpur, from where it launched daylight strikes over vital targets, mostly in hostile weather conditions. During the latter part of the war, the Hawks flew combat air patrol in Gorkhapur Sector.

==== After the War ====
After the war, the IAF embarked on its modernisation programme, and the Hawks were chosen to be equipped with Folland Gnats. By the end of 1966, the squadron had achieved total operational capability with Gnats. During this period the squadron pilots and technicians underwent much training and retraining alongside several other squadrons.

=== Bangladesh Liberation War ===
In 1971, the Hawks were operating from Tezpur AFS. On 2 December, the squadron received a message to move to Kumbhighram Sector in Assam, to provide combat air support to ground troops in eastern India, against heavily defended positions. Within six days of the war, the squadron had flown several sorties attacking enemy gun positions and vital target systems in Brahmanbaria, Moulvibazar, Munshibazar, Sylhet, Kulaura, Narayanganj, Dolanganj and Mainwati. The squadron was also the first of the IAF to provide air cover to helilift operations.

=== Recent years ===
The squadron has been equipped with a variety of aircraft in the past, the most recent being the Su-30MKI. In various inter-squadron training exercises, the squadron has won various trophies.

== Aircraft ==
Aircraft types operated by the squadron

Aircraft type	From	To	Air base
de Havilland Vampire FB52	16 February 1962	January 1966	AFS Chabua
Folland Gnat I	February 1966	February 1982	
Mig-21 bis	February 1982	July 1997	
Sukhoi Su-30MKI/ MK	July 1997	Present	

== Exercise ==
The Indian Air Force deployed Sukhoi Su-30MKI Flankers for Exercise Ocean Sky 2025

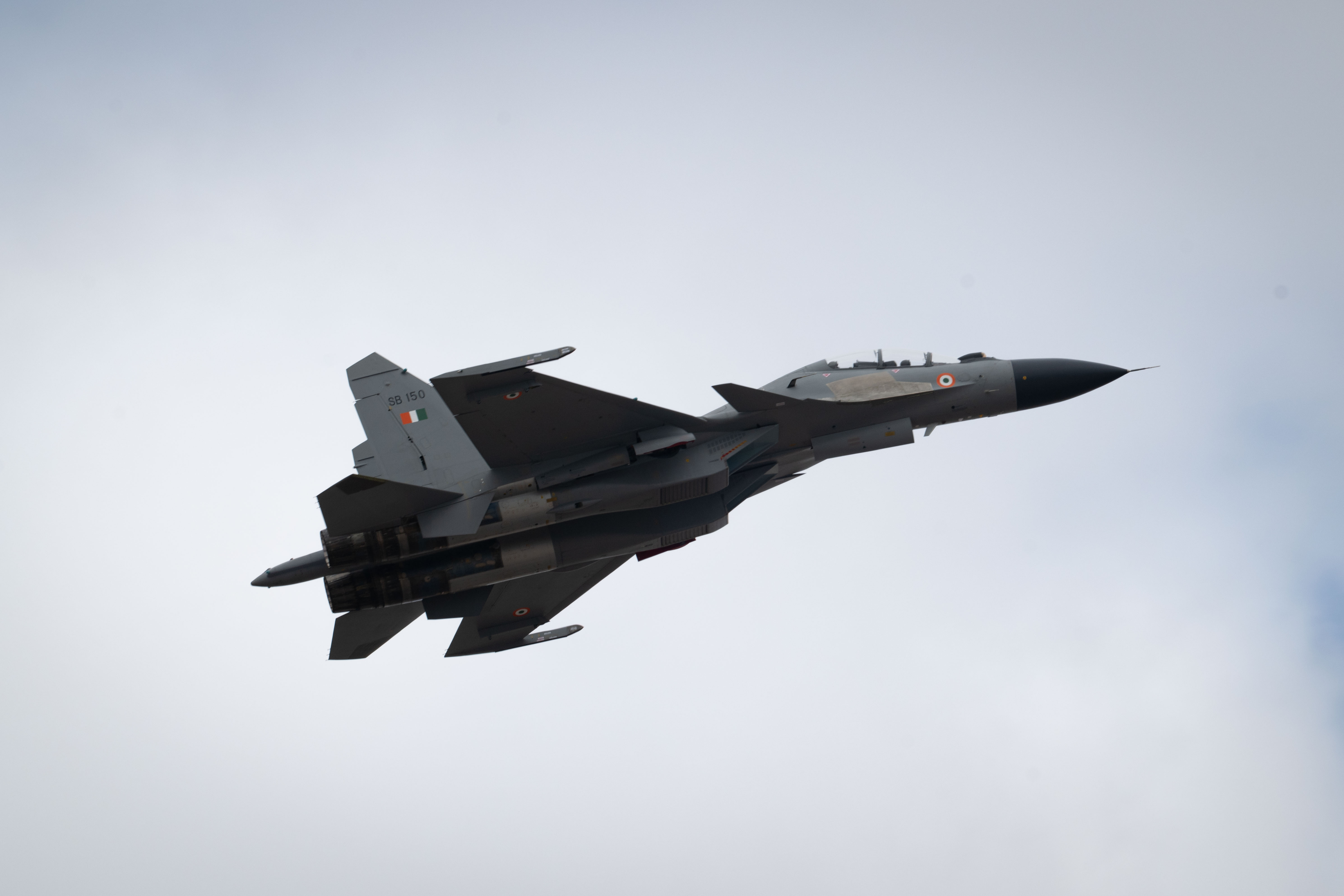
An Indian Sukhoi Su-30MKI flies during Exercise Ocean Sky 25 at Gando Air Base, Gran Canaria, Spain, Oct. 27th, 2025.

== Awards ==
- Nirmal Singh Jamwal, VM (Devotion to Duty)
- Umesh Rakhra, VM (Devotion to Duty)
- Kothapalli Venkata Rama Raju, VM (Devotion to Duty)
