= Deputy Chief of the Air Staff (India) =

Senior Appointment in the Indian Air Force

- Flag of an Air Marshal

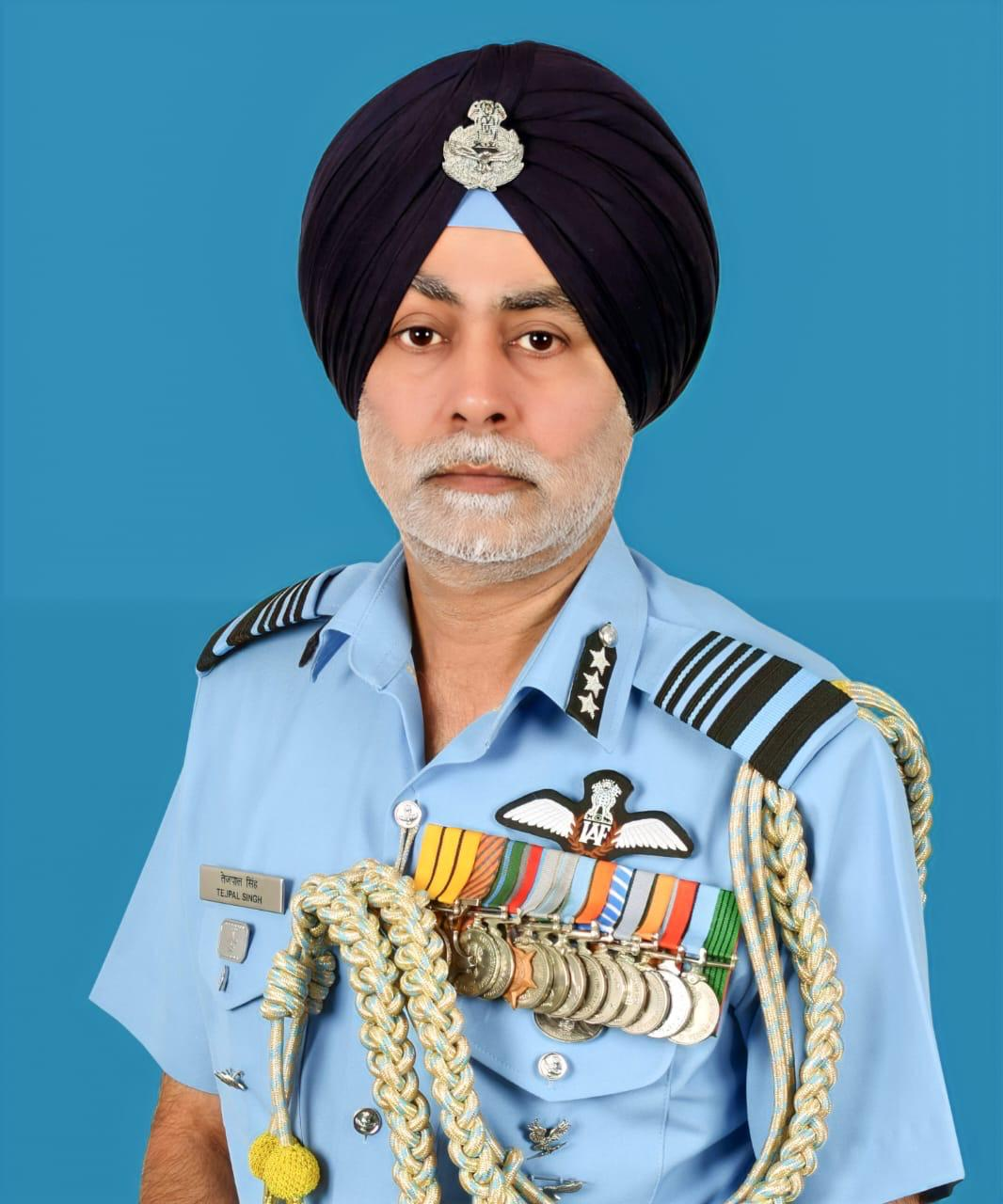
- Incumbent; Air Marshal Tejpal Singh, AVSM, VM since 1 August 2026
- Indian Air Force
- Type: Principal Staff Officer
- Abbreviation: DCAS
- Reports to: Chief of the Air Staff
- Residence: Bungalow 5, Kushak Road, Teen Murti Marg Area, New Delhi, Delhi 110011, India.
- Seat: Air Headquarters, New Delhi
- First holder: Air Vice Marshal Subroto Mukerjee

The Deputy Chief of the Air Staff (DCAS) is a senior appointment in the Indian Air Force. The DCAS is a Principal Staff Officer (PSO) to the Chief of the Air Staff at Air Force Headquarters in New Delhi. The office is held by a three star officer in the rank of Air Marshal.

== History ==
At the time of independence of India on 15 August 1947, Air Commodore Subroto Mukerjee was appointed Deputy Air Commander, Royal Indian Air Force, in addition to being Senior Air Staff Officer (SASO) at the newly-formed Air HQ. On 15 November the same year, he was promoted to the acting rank of Air Vice Marshal.

In 1949, the RIAF was reorganised and the post was re-designated Deputy Chief of the Air Staff (DCAS). The DCAS continued to be the Deputy Air Commander. On 1 January 1963, the post of Vice Chief of the Air Staff was created and became the second-highest post of the Indian Air Force. In 1968, the post was upgraded to three-star rank Air Marshal.

The DCAS ranks at No. 24 on the Indian order of precedence, along with Lieutenant Generals of the Indian Army and Vice Admirals of the Indian Navy. The DCAS is in the HAG+ pay scale (pay level 16), and draws salary depending on the years in service. However, since they should not draw equivalent or more than the next higher level, the remuneration is capped at ₹224,000.

== Appointees ==
S.No.	Rank	Name	Assumed office	Left office	Notes
Deputy Air Commander, Royal Indian Air Force
1	Air Vice Marshal (Note: Appointed as an Air Commodore, promoted to the rank of Air vice-marshal on 15 November 1947.)	Subroto Mukerjee**	15 August 1947	31 January 1949	
Deputy Chief of the Air Staff
	Air Vice Marshal	Subroto Mukerjee**	1 February 1949	16 December 1952	
2	Air Vice Marshal	Aspy Merwan Engineer**	17 December 1952	30 April 1958	
3	Air Vice Marshal	Diwan Atma Ram Nanda	1 May 1958	31 December 1962	
4	Air Vice Marshal	Arjan Singh**	1 January 1963	4 August 1963	
5	Air Vice Marshal	Ramaswamy Rajaram	5 August 1963	30 September 1964	
6	Air Vice Marshal	Minoo Merwan Engineer	1 October 1964	28 February 1968	
7	Air Marshal	Minoo Merwan Engineer	1 March 1968	4 August 1969	
8	Air Marshal	Om Prakash Mehra**	7 August 1969	28 February 1971	
9	Air Marshal	Hirendra Nath Chatterjee	30 March 1971	31 March 1972	
10	Air Marshal	Yeshwant Vinayak Malse	3 May 1972	31 March 1973	
11	Air Marshal	Hari Chand Dewan	1 April 1973	18 October 1973	
12	Air Marshal	Sarosh Jehangir Dastur	12 November 1973	27 June 1974	
13	Air Marshal	Devaiah Subia	27 June 1974	31 March 1977	
14	Air Marshal	Jafar Zaheer	20 May 1977	23 August 1978	
15	Air Marshal	Lal Singh Grewal	24 August 1978	31 January 1980	
16	Air Marshal	Malcolm Wollen	16 April 1980	2 January 1981	
17	Air Marshal	Chandra Kant Viswanath Gole	15 January 1981	30 June 1983	
18	Air Marshal	Kapil Dev Chadha	8 July 1983	31 October 1984	
19	Air Marshal	Johney William Greene	1 January 1985	31 May 1986	
20	Air Marshal	Surinder Mehra**	1 June 1986	28 February 1987	
21	Air Marshal	Prithi Singh	1 March 1987	31 July 1988	
22	Air Marshal	Rajendra Kumar Dhawan	1 August 1988	1 April 1990	
23	Air Marshal	Brijesh Dhar Jayal	2 April 1990	6 October 1991	
24	Air Marshal	Trilochan Singh Brar	7 October 1991	30 April 1993	
25	Air Marshal	Prabhat Kumar Varma	1 May 1993	28 February 1994	
26	Air Marshal	Sharadkumar Ramakrishna Deshpande	1 March 1994	31 January 1996	
27	Air Marshal	Srinivasapuram Krishnaswamy**	1 February 1996	23 July 1996	
28	Air Marshal	Man Mohan Singh Vasudeva	24 July 1996	31 August 1997	
29	Air Marshal	Syed Shahid Hussain Naqvi	1 September 1997	30 September 1999	
30	Air Marshal	Satish Govind Inamdar	1 October 1999	30 November 2000	
31	Air Marshal	Tej Mohan Asthana	1 December 2000	17 March 2002	
32	Air Marshal	Raghu Rajan	5 June 2002	31 March 2004	
33	Air Marshal	Jaspal Singh Gujral	1 April 2004	30 April 2005	
34	Air Marshal	Arvind Kumar Nagalia	24 August 2005	28 February 2007	
35	Air Marshal	Norman Anil Kumar Browne**	1 March 2007	31 May 2009	
36	Air Marshal	Nirdosh Vatsyayan Tyagi	1 June 2009	31 January 2011	
37	Air Marshal	Ravi Kant Sharma	1 February 2011	30 November 2012	
38	Air Marshal	Subramanyam Sukumar	1 December 2012	28 February 2014	
39	Air Marshal	Sridharan Panicker Radha Krishnan Nair	1 March 2014	30 April 2014	
40	Air Marshal	Shyam Bihari Prasad Sinha	1 May 2014	31 December 2015	
41	Air Marshal	Rakesh Kumar Singh Bhadauria**	1 January 2016	28 February 2017	
42	Air Marshal	Raghunath Nambiar	1 March 2017	30 September 2018	
43	Air Marshal	Vivek Ram Chaudhari**	1 October 2018	30 September 2019	
44	Air Marshal	Sandeep Singh	1 October 2019	30 April 2021	
45	Air Marshal	Suraj Kumar Jha	1 May 2021	31 July 2021	
46	Air Marshal	Narmdeshwar Tiwari	1 October 2021	30 April 2023	
47	Air Marshal	Ashutosh Dixit**	15 May 2023	31 August 2024	
48	Air Marshal	Tejinder Singh	1 September 2024	30 April 2025	
49	Air Marshal	Awadhesh Kumar Bharti	1 June 2025	31 July 2026	
50	Air Marshal	Tejpal Singh	1 August 2026	Present	

** Went on to become Chief of the Air Staff

== See also ==
- Chief of the Air Staff
- Vice Chief of the Air Staff
- Deputy Chief of the Army Staff
- Deputy Chief of the Navy Staff
