= Directorate of Air Staff Inspection =

Directorate of Air Staff Inspection (DASI) is an official inspecting body of Indian Air Force. DASI inspectors assess the tactical and operational levels of IAF aircraft's to ascertain if they are capable of meeting war-time requirements.

DASI also inspects and rates the performance of IAF pilots and squadrons.
