= Navigation Training School IAF =

Indian Air Force Institute

Navigation Training School (NTS) is a training institute of the Indian Air Force based at AF Station, Begumpet. NTS moved to a new ergonomically designed training facility in 2010, which has a navigation simulator.
