= Training Command (India) =

Training Command Indian Air Force
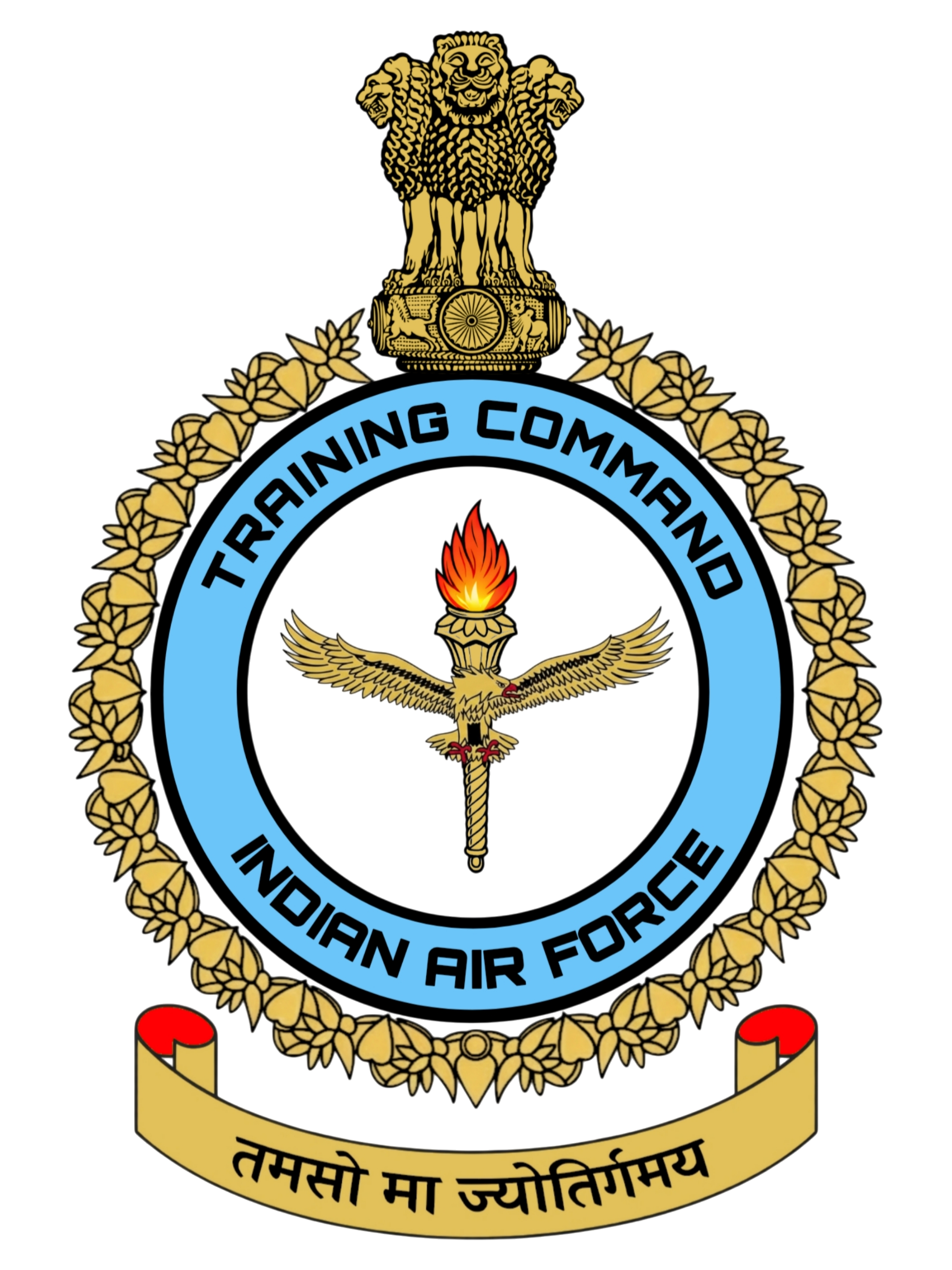
- Emblem of the Air Training Command
- Founded: 22 July 1949
- Country: India
- Branch: Indian Air Force
- Type: Operational Air Command
- Role: Flying and ground training.
- Headquarters: Bangalore, Karnataka
- Mottos: Sanskrit: Tamasoma Jyotirgamaya "From darkness, lead us unto Light"

Commanders
- Air Officer Commanding-in-Chief: Air Marshal Seethepalli Shrinivas, AVSM, VSM

Training Command is the Indian Air Force's command responsible for flying and ground training.

In the 1930s, the approaching threat and later advent of World War II and the leaning of Japan towards the Axis powers, the latter was considered as a potential enemy. Therefore, need was felt to make IAF a self-supporting force for the South Eastern Theatre of war. This led to the rapid expansion of the IAF. A target was fixed of 10 IAF Squadrons. With this expansion, the requirement of pilots and technical personnel increased. For the training of technical personnel, a technical training school was set up at Ambala in 1940.

In a 1949 reorganisation of the Indian Air Force, while frontline units were put under the Operations Command, all the training institutions were placed under the jurisdiction of the Training Command. Among Training Command's units is the Navigation Training School at Begumpet Air Force Station, Hyderabad. It flies the BAe HS. 748, the Basic Flying Training School and the Air Force Administrative College. The Hawk Operational Training Squadron and Weapon System Operators' School are located at Bidar Air Force Station which flows the Hawk Mk 132 trainer aircraft.

== Early training platforms ==
Before and during the early years of Training Command’s establishment, the Indian Air Force relied on British-origin trainer aircraft such as the de Havilland Tiger Moth, Percival Prentice, and the North American Harvard to train successive batches of pilots. These aircraft formed the bedrock of IAF’s basic and advanced flight training from the 1930s through the 1950s, before being gradually replaced by indigenous and jet-powered platforms. A detailed account of this evolution has been documented in:

== Air Officer Commanding-in-Chief ==
List of Air Officer Commanding-in-Chief
Rank	Name	From	To
Air commodore	Ravinder Hari Darshan Singh	22 July 1949	3 December 1952
Air commodore	Surendra Nath Goyal	17 December 1952	10 January 1956
Air commodore	Pratap Chandra Lal	11 January 1956	20 November 1957
Air commodore	Kanwar Jaswant Singh	27 May 1958	22 March 1959
Air commodore	Ranjan Dutt	23 March 1959	12 April 1960
Air Vice Marshal	Ranjan Dutt	13 April 1960	29 December 1960
Air Vice Marshal	Surendra Nath Goyal	1 April 1961	6 August 1966
Air Vice Marshal	Teja Singh Virk	10 August 1966	22 August 1969
Air Vice Marshal	Victor Srihari	30 August 1969	3 March 1972
Air Vice Marshal	Anand Ramdas Pandit	4 March 1972	8 April 1973
Air Vice Marshal	Gian Dev Sharma	9 April 1973	29 June 1947
Air Vice Marshal	George Kanishtkumar John	1 July 1974	22 March 1976
Air Marshal	Maurice Barker	22 April 1976	22 September 1976
Air Marshal	Randhir Singh	23 October 1976	29 April 1978
Air Marshal	Hemant Ramkrishna Chitnis	11 May 1978	19 February 1979
Air Marshal	George Kanishtkumar John	20 February 1979	30 September 1979
Air Marshal	Balwant Wickram Chauhan	29 October 1979	19 September 1981
Air Marshal	Erasseri Pathayapurayil Radhakrishnan Nair	20 October 1981	28 February 1985
Air Marshal	Vir Narain	1 March 1985	30 November 1987
Air Marshal	Jagdish Kumar Seth	1 December 1987	30 September 1991
Air Marshal	Rajendra Kumar Dhawan	7 October 1991	31 May 1993
Air Marshal	Verinder Puri	3 September 1993	31 May 1995
Air Marshal	Krishna Bihari Singh	1 July 1995	31 December 1997
Air Marshal	Jagbir Singh Rai	1 January 1998	31 March 2001
Air Marshal	Teshter Jall Master	1 April 2001	31 December 2002
Air Marshal	Bijoy Krishna Pandey	3 February 2003	31 May 2004
Air Marshal	Subhash Bhojwani	12 July 2004	31 January 2006
Air Marshal	Bhushan Nilkanth Gokhale	1 March 2006	31 October 2006
Air Marshal	Gurnam Singh Choudhary	1 November 2006	30 April 2008
Air Marshal	Venkataraman Ramamurthy Iyer	1 May 2008	30 November 2010
Air Marshal	Dhiraj Kukreja	1 December 2010	29 February 2012
Air Marshal	Rajinder Singh	1 March 2012	30 June 2013
Air Marshal	Paramjit Singh Gill	1 July 2013	30 June 2014
Air Marshal	Ramesh Rai	1 July 2014	31 July 2015
Air Marshal	Sridharan Panicker Radha Krishnan Nair	1 September 2015	31 July 2018
Air Marshal	Rakesh Kumar Singh Bhadauria	1 August 2018	30 April 2019
Air Marshal	Surendra Kumar Ghotia	1 May 2019	30 September 2019
Air Marshal	Arvindra Singh Butola	1 October 2019	30 September 2020
Air Marshal	Rajiv Dayal Mathur	1 October 2020	31 July 2021
Air Marshal	Manavendra Singh	25 September 2021	31 December 2022
Air Marshal	Radhakrishnan Radhish	1 January 2023	30 April 2024
Air Marshal	Nagesh Kapoor	1 May 2024	30 April 2025
Air Marshal	Tejinder Singh	1 May 2025	31 December 2025
Air Marshal	Seethepalli Shrinivas	1 January 2026	Incumbent

== See also ==
- Maintenance Command

== Sources ==
- Sarkar, M. C. (1962). Hindustan year-book and who's who.
