= Flying Instructors School (India) =

Military flying school

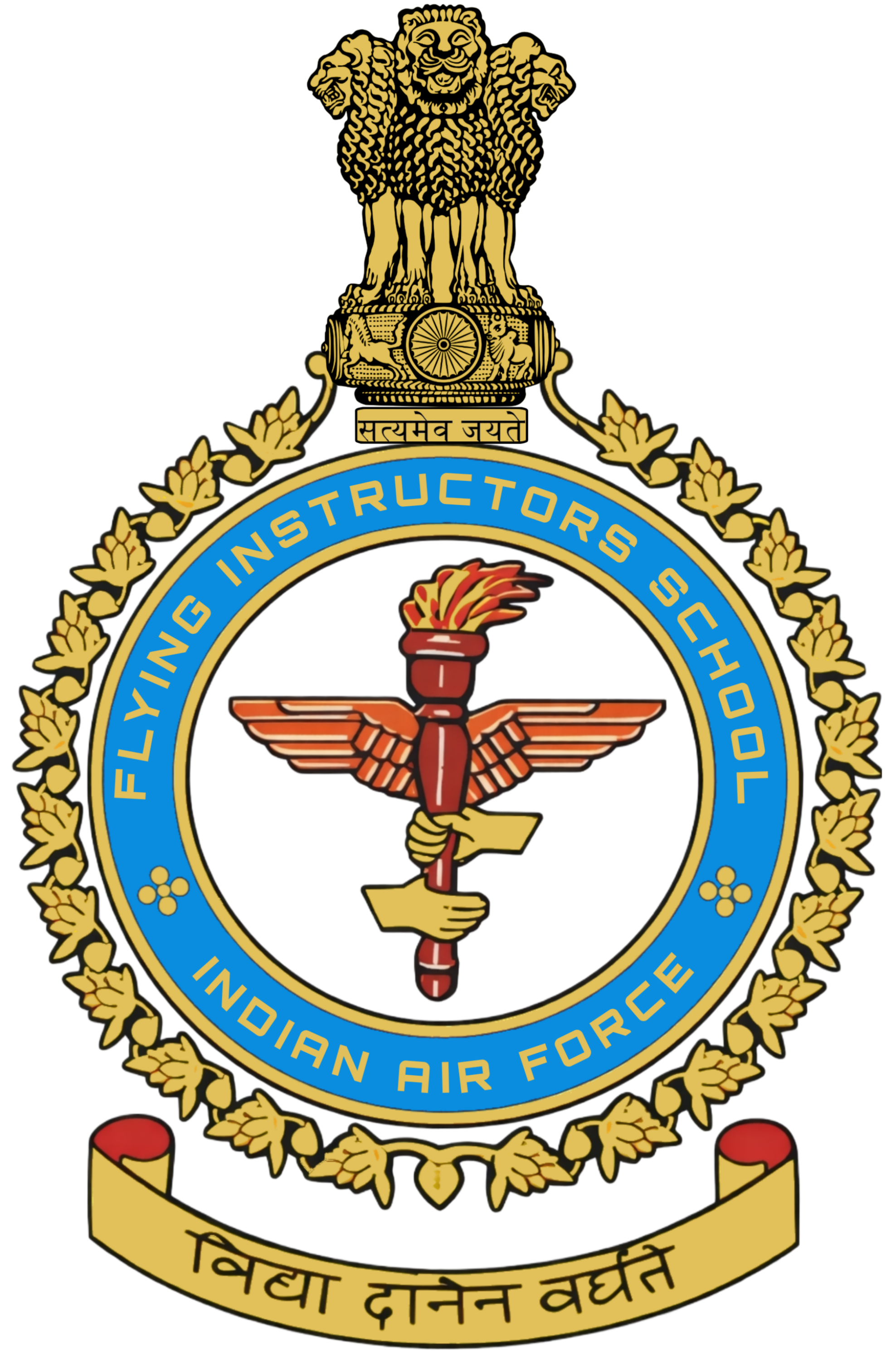
- Motto: विद्या दानॆन वर्धतॆ (Sanskrit)
- Motto in English: Knowledge multiplies when disseminated
- Established: 1948
- Commandant: Group Captain P P Mishra
- Location: Tambaram, Chennai, Tamil Nadu, India
- Website: Flying Instructors School

The Flying Instructors School or FIS is a training institution of the Indian Air Force. The FIS trains operational pilots of the Indian Armed Forces and friendly foreign countries to be flying instructors. Pilots of the Indian Air Force, the Indian Army, the Indian Navy, Indian Coast Guard and friendly foreign countries join and graduate from the School as Qualified Flying Instructor. It is based at Air Force Station Tambaram, in the suburb of Chennai.

The FIS conducts Qualified Flying Instructors Course and imparts Air and Ground training instructions to trainee pilots. The graduates of FIS are called as Qualified Flying Instructor.

== History ==
The FIS was established on 1 April 1948 at Ambala Air Force Station. Flight Lieutenant L R D Blunt, VrC took over as the first commanding officer. The school moved from Ambala to Air Force Station Tambaram in 1954.

== Motto ==
The school's motto is VIDYA DANEN VARDHATE, a line from the Chanakya's ancient treatise Arthashastra. It means Knowledge when imparted multiplies.

== See also ==
- Basic Flying Training School (India)
- Directorate of Air Staff Inspection
- Air Force Administrative College
- Paratrooper Training School
- Mehar Singh
