= Air Force Academy (India) =

IAF's training central for aerial and logistical warfare

Indian Air Force Academy
- भारतीय वायु सेना अकादमी
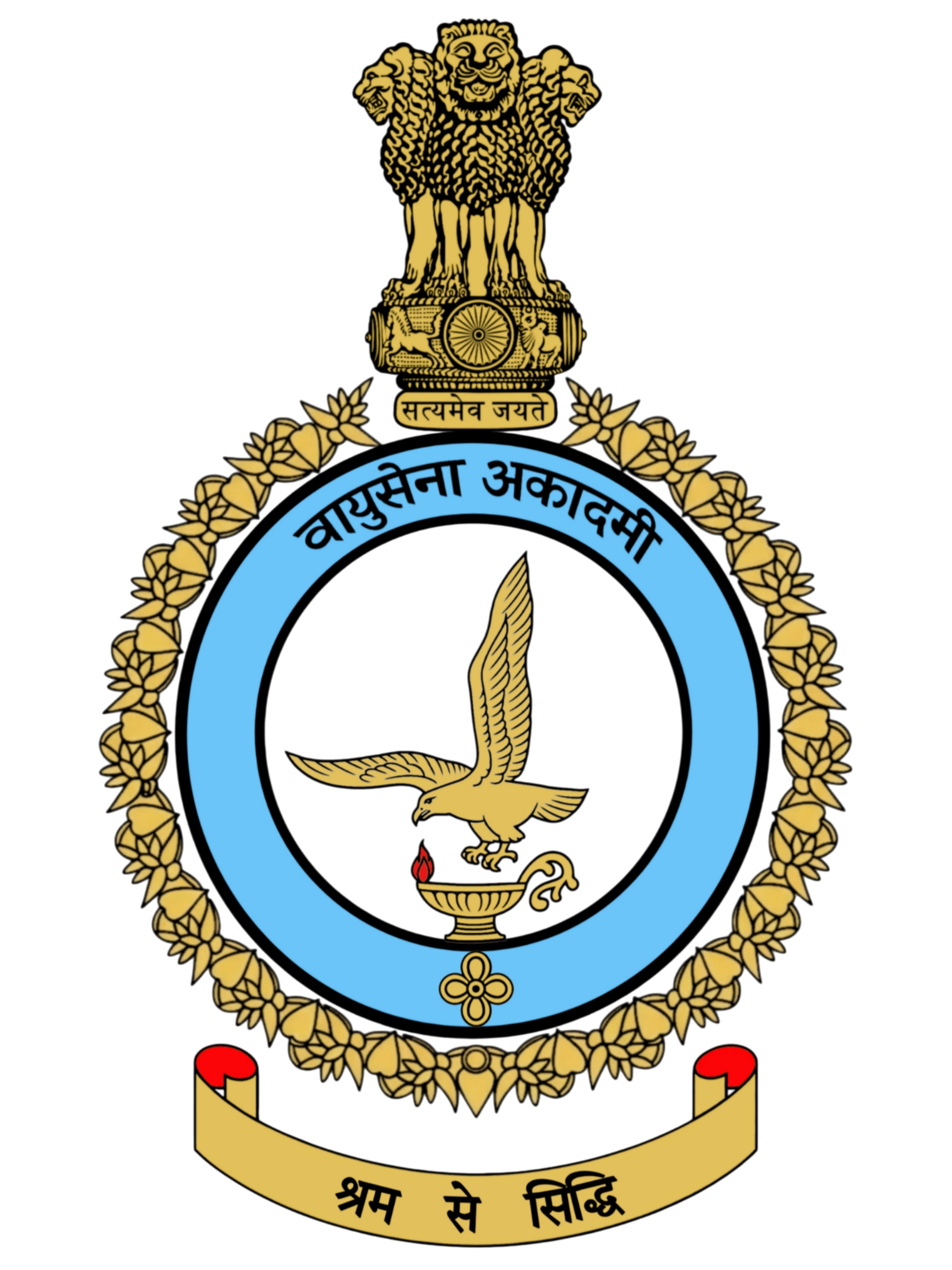
- Crest of the Air Force Academy
- Motto: श्रम से सिद्धि
- Motto in English: Shram Se Sidhi (Achievement Through Diligence)
- Type: Military Academy
- Established: 1969; 57 years ago
- Commandant: Air Marshal Rahul Bhasin
- Location: Dundigal, Telangana, India; 17°37′38″N 078°24′12″E
- Campus: Suburban, 705 acres (2.85 km^{2})
- Colours: Sky blue and White

Indian Air Force Academy
- IATA: none; ICAO: VODG

Summary
- Airport type: Defence Service training institute
- Owner: Ministry of Defence, Government of India
- Operator: Indian Air Force
- Location: Dundigal, Telangana, India
- Elevation AMSL: 2,013 ft (614 m)
- Interactive map of Indian Air Force Academy

Runways
Direction	Length		Surface
Direction	ft	m	Surface
10R/28L	6,800	2,073	Asphalt
10L/28R	8,250	2,515	Concrete

Air Force Academy is a defence service academy of the Indian Air Force. It is located in Medchal-Malkajgiri district, 43 km (27 mi) from Hyderabad, in the state of Telangana.

The academy was set up to train cadets from the Indian Air Force cadre of officers. It imparts training to the flying, technical and ground duty branches as well as officers of the Indian Navy & the Indian Coast Guard. This is a home for the officer trainees who learn their specialisation and are nurtured to become capable leaders. After one year's training, officer cadets are commissioned into various branches of the Indian Air Force (IAF). It inducted women cadets into the IAF for the first time in June 1993.

== History ==
The foundation stone of the Air Force Academy was laid by the then President of India Dr. Zakir Hussain on 11 October 1967. The academy was established in 1969 and started operations in 16 Jan 1971. It is located at Dundigal, about 25 km (16 mi) from the twin cities of Hyderabad and Secunderabad, spread over 7,050 acres (2,850 ha). Air Commodore J. D. Aquino was the first Commandant of the academy.

Historic trainers used by the IAF included:

de Havilland Tiger Moth – Basic trainer (1930s–1950s)

North American Harvard – Advanced trainer during WWII and post-independence

Percival Prentice – Used briefly post-WWII for pilot training

A comprehensive overview of these types and their roles in shaping IAF pilot training has been documented by Gupta (2023).

== Commandant ==
The Commandant is the head and in-charge of all the functioning of the Air Force Academy. The Commandant of the Academy is a Three-star rank officer holding the rank of Air Marshal. The present commandant of the academy is Air Marshal Rahul Bhasin.

== Training ==
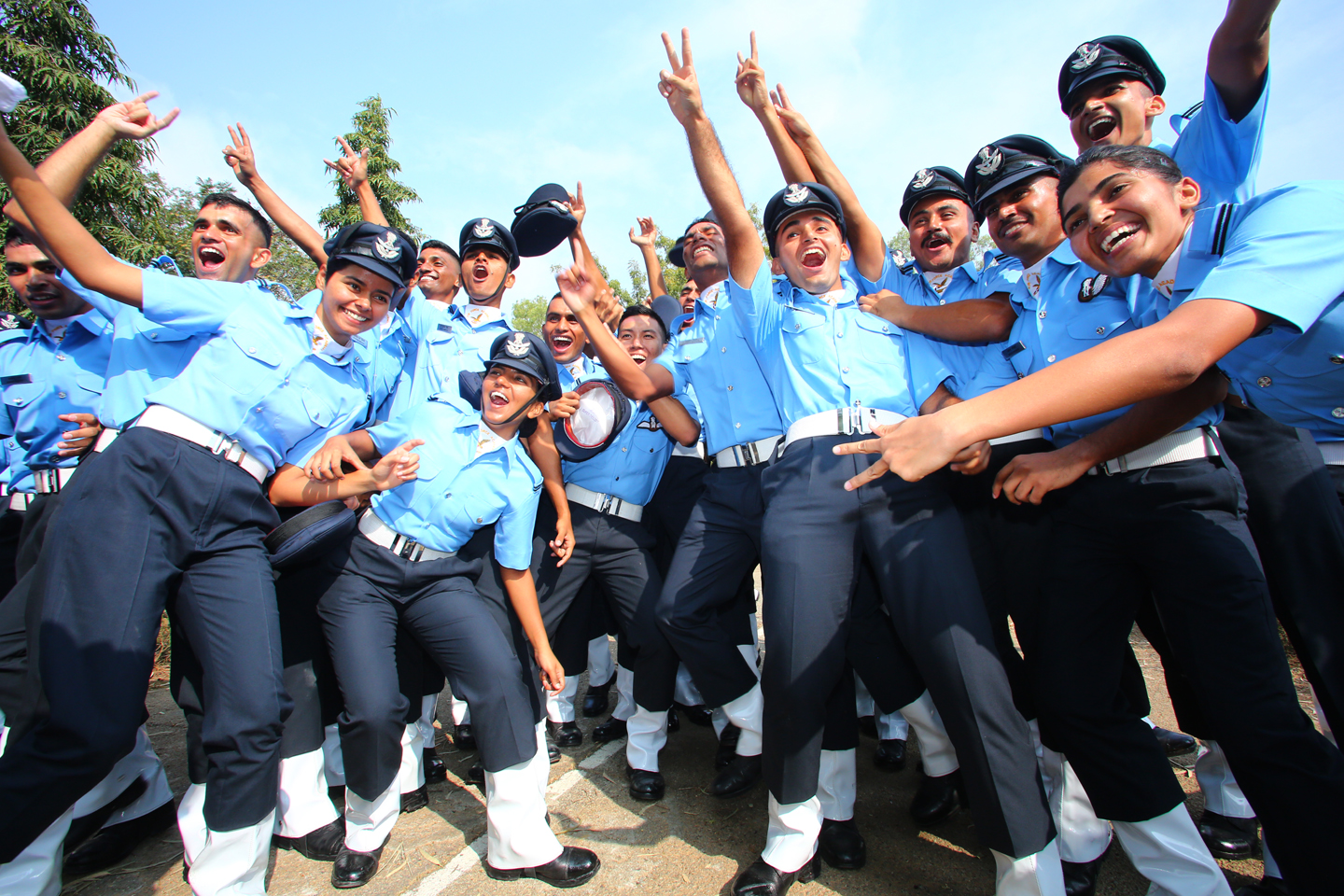
Flying Officers at Graduation Parade

In this academy, IAF pilots are trained to learn flying through successive stages. Pilatus PC-7 Mk II (turboprop airplane) for basic training, , HAL HJT-16 Kiran (jet) or HAL HTT-40 (turboprop) for intermediate and jet training, and the BAE Hawk Mk 132 for advanced jet training.Those who pass out as fighter pilots serve in front-line combat squadrons equipped with Rafale, Su-30MKI, MiG-29, Mirage 2000, Tejas aircraft. For those interested in flying transport aircraft, the IAF offers heavy multi engined Il-76 aircraft, C-17 Globemaster III and the twin engined multi role An-32 transport aircraft, besides HS 748 and the Dornier 228 light utility transport aircraft.

By joining the helicopter fleet, the trainees learn to fly at treetop height and landing in remote areas. The curriculum also includes flying helicopter gunships like Indian developed Dhruv, Attack helicopter like AH-64 Apache, Mi-26, heavy-lift choppers, casualty evacuation, para dropping of troops and air lifting of supplies.

The academy imparts specialist training to young men and women who shoulder responsibility as leaders in other areas of air force operations. These are administrative, air controlling, meteorological, logistics, accounts and education branches. Swimming, field and indoor games are included in the evening routine.

Officers from friendly foreign countries are also occasionally trained at the Air Force Academy.

The following are the types of training conducted at the academy:

- Flying training

If a cadet has joined the Flying Branch, training is divided into Stage I, II and III. Each stage takes the trainee pilots from fundamental to more complex levels of aviation. It is after Stage III that the cadets are sent for specialisation on fighter, helicopter or transport aircraft.

- Air Traffic Control Officers' training

The training at the Air Force Academy for Air Traffic Control is designed on the basis of the International Civil Aviation Organisation (ICAO) procedures, altered to suit the military aviation requirements.

- Ground Duty Officers' training

Ground Duty Officers' training is for all non-technical branches of the Indian Air Force. If the cadet has joined the Administrative, Logistics, Accounts, Education or Meteorology division, they will be trained at the Air Force Academy before joining the Air Force as Ground Duty Officer.

- Joint Services training

Cadets of the Flying, Air Traffic Control and the Ground Duty Branches are imparted Joint Services Training here for 22 weeks. The cadets selected for entry into the Aeronautical Engineering Branches are sent to the Air Force Technical College at Jalahalli, Bangalore. Training includes common service subjects like administration and service knowledge.

== See also ==
- Indian Military Academy, Dehradun
- Indian Naval Academy, Ezhimala
- Kendriya Vidyalaya No. 1 AFA, Dundigal
- Kendriya Vidyalaya No. 2 AFA, Dundigal

== In popular culture ==
- The 1994 Malayalam film Sainyam was filmed and set in the Academy.
- A part of the aerial action Hindi film, Fighter (2024 film) was shot in the Air Force Academy (India) in February/March 2023
- Large part of the Vijeta (1982 film) was set and shot in the Academy.
