= Air vice marshal (India) =

Two-star rank in the Indian Air Force

- Flag of an air vice marshal

- Shoulder board of an air vice marshal

- Rank insignia of an air vice marshal
- Country: India
- Service branch: Indian Air Force
- Abbreviation: AVM
- Rank: Two-star rank
- Next higher rank: Air marshal
- Next lower rank: Air commodore
- Equivalent ranks: Major general (Indian Army); Rear admiral (Indian Navy)

Air vice marshal is a two-star air officer rank in the Indian Air Force. It is the third-highest active rank in the Indian Air Force. Air vice marshal ranks above the one-star rank of air commodore and below the three-star rank of air marshal.

The equivalent rank in the Indian Army is major general and in the Indian Navy is rear admiral.

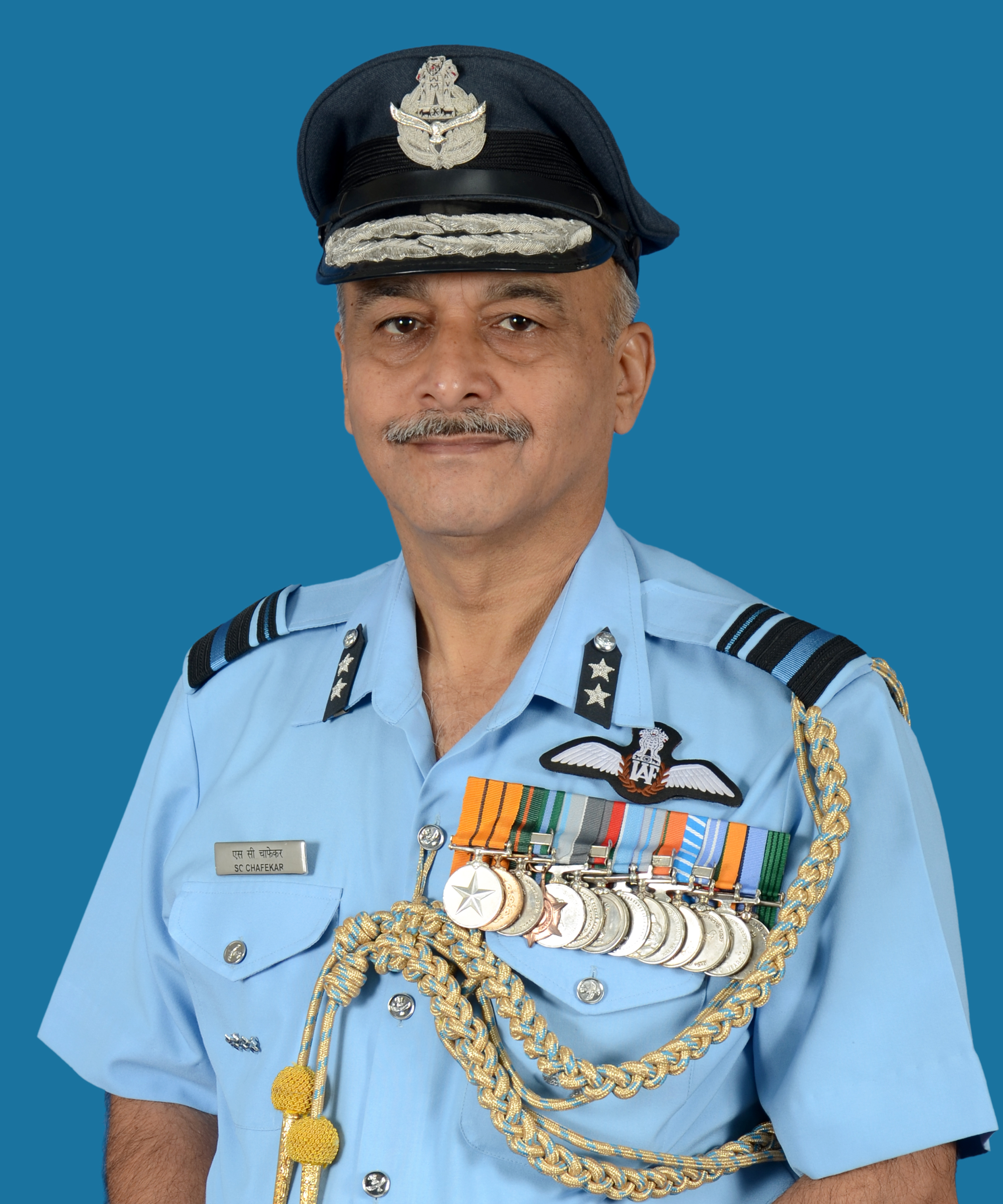
Air Vice Marshal S.C. Chafekar in an AVM's uniform.

== Appointments ==
Officers in the rank of air vice marshal hold important appointments like Air Officer Commanding Jammu and Kashmir (AOC J&K), Air Officer Commanding advance HQs of the air commands. At air headquarters, air vice marshals hold the appointments of assistant chief of air staff in different staff branches and those of additional director general.

== Insignia ==
The flag of an Air vice marshal is sky blue with the Indian Air Force roundel surmounted by the eagle from the Indian Air Force badge, with two yellow stars in the fly. The badges of rank consist of one sky blue band (on a slightly wider navy blue band) over a sky blue band on a navy blue broad band. An air vice marshal wears gorget patches which are blue patches with two white stars. In addition to this, the blue grey terrywool tunic has two sleeve stripes consisting of a broad band with one narrow band.

== Order of precedence ==
An air vice marshal who is a principal staff officer (PSO) ranks at number 25 in the Indian order of precedence. Other air vice marshals are at number 26 in the order of precedence.

Air vice marshals are at pay level 14, with a monthly pay between ₹144,200 (US$1,950) and ₹218,200 (US$2,950).

== Rank insignia and personal flag ==
Indian Air Force air vice marshal sleeve insignia

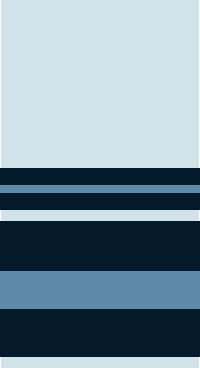
Indian Air Force air vice marshal shoulder board

== See also ==
- List of serving air marshals of the Indian Air Force
- Air Force ranks and insignia of India
- Air officer commanding
