= Air marshal (India) =

Rank of Indian Air Force

- Air Marshal of the IAF rank flag

- Shoulder board of an air marshal

- Rank insignia of an air marshal
- Country: India
- Service branch: Indian Air Force
- Abbreviation: AM
- Rank: Three-star rank
- Next higher rank: Air chief marshal
- Next lower rank: Air vice marshal
- Equivalent ranks: Lieutenant general (Indian Army); Vice admiral (Indian Navy)

Air marshal is a three-star air officer rank in the Indian Air Force. It is the second-highest active rank in the Indian Air Force. Air marshal ranks above the two-star rank of air vice marshal and below the four-star rank of air chief marshal, which is held by the Chief of the Air Staff.

The equivalent rank in the Indian Army is lieutenant general and in the Indian Navy is vice admiral. Officers in the rank of air marshal hold important appointments at the air commands and at the air headquarters.

== History ==
From 1947 to 1966, the appointment of Chief of the Air Staff, the professional head of the Indian Air Force was held by an air marshal. The position of the CAS was upgraded from air marshal to air chief marshal in 1966. The first IAF officer to hold the rank was ACM Arjan Singh (later promoted to the five-star rank of marshal of the Indian Air Force) who was promoted to the rank while he served as the CAS.

== Air commanders (C-in-C grade) ==
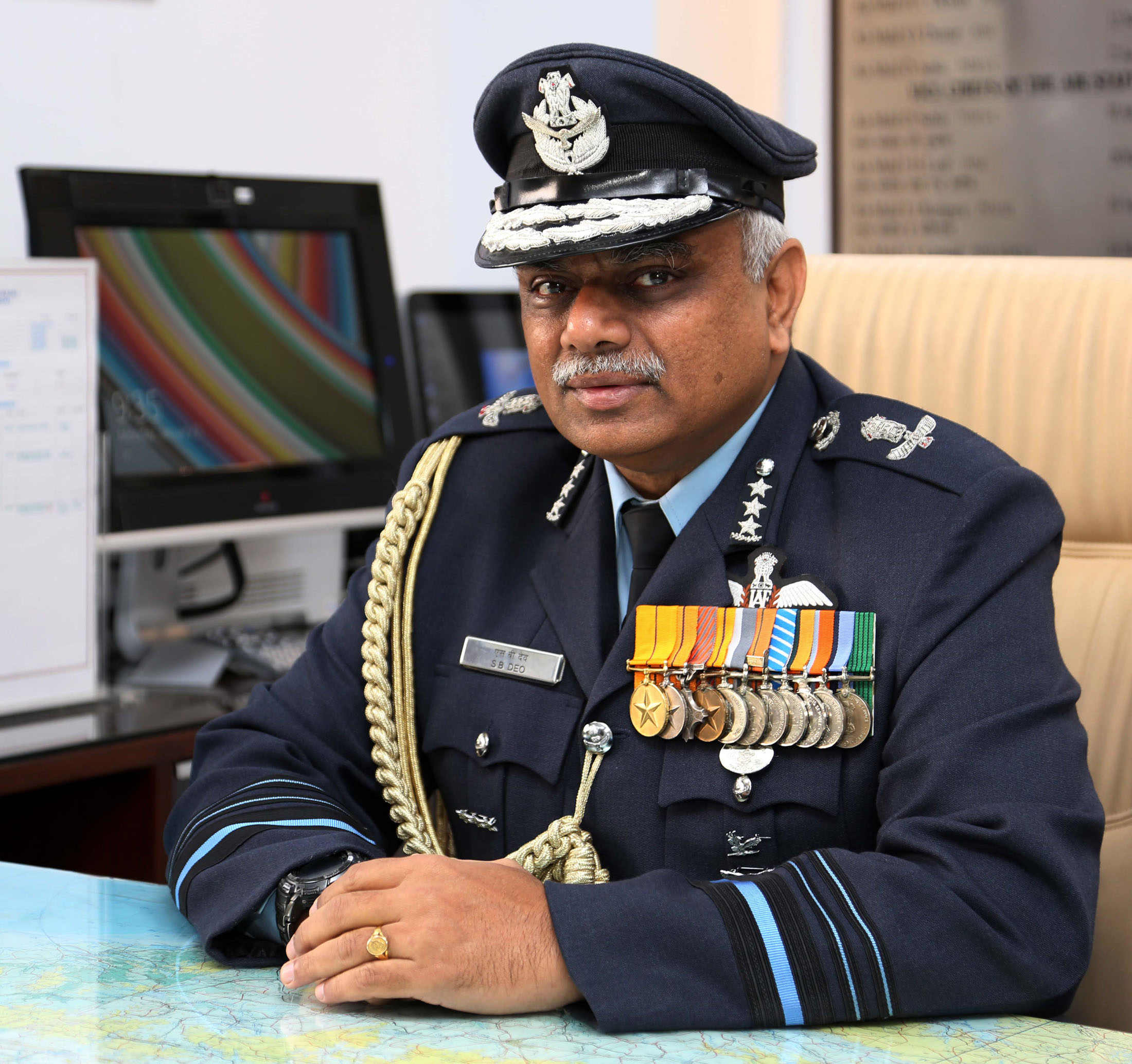
Air Marshal S B Deo in uniform

Senior air marshals who are in the C-in-C grade (air commanders), are considered to be in a grade higher than other air marshals. They hold the most senior appointments like the Vice Chief of the Air Staff and the heads of the seven air commands (styled "air officer commanding-in-chief"). The seven AOC-in-C appointments are:

- Air Officer Commanding-in-Chief Central Air Command
- Air Officer Commanding-in-Chief Eastern Air Command
- Air Officer Commanding-in-Chief Southern Air Command
- Air Officer Commanding-in-Chief South Western Air Command
- Air Officer Commanding-in-Chief Western Air Command
- Air Officer Commanding-in-Chief Training Command
- Air Officer Commanding-in-Chief Maintenance Command

== Appointments ==
At air headquarters, the principal staff officers (PSO) are senior air marshals. air marshals hold the appointments of assistant chief of air staff in different staff branches and those of additional director general. The Heads of services and directorates (Director General) are officers of the rank of air marshal. The senior air staff officers (chiefs of staff) of the seven commands of the Air Force are also of the rank of air marshal.

== Insignia ==
The flag of an Air vice marshal is sky blue with the Indian Air Force roundel surmounted by the eagle from the Indian Air Force badge, with three yellow stars in the fly. The badges of rank consist of two sky blue bands (each on a slightly wider navy blue band) over a sky blue band on a navy blue broad band. An air marshal wears gorget patches which are blue patches with three white stars. Air commanders in the C-in-C grade have additional oak leaves under the three white stars. In addition to this, the blue grey terrywool tunic has three sleeve stripes consisting of a broad band with two narrower bands.

== Order of precedence ==
An air marshal in the C-in-C grade ranks at number 23 on the Indian order of precedence, along with lieutenant generals of the Indian Army and vice admirals of the Indian Navy in the C-in-C grade. The other air marshals rank at number 24 in the order of precedence.

Air marshals in the C-in-C grade are at the apex pay scale (pay level 17), with a monthly pay of ₹225,000 (US$3,100). Other air marshals, in the HAG+ pay scale (pay level 16) draw lesser, depending on the years in service. However, since they should not draw equivalent or more than the next higher level, the remuneration is capped at ₹224,000.

== See also ==
- List of serving air marshals of the Indian Air Force
- Air Force ranks and insignia of India
- Air officer commanding
- Historical context and on the creation of the Air Marshal rank – by Anchit Gupta
- Indian Air Force History Blog – curated insights into IAF ranks, officers, and evolution
