= Raghunath Nambiar =

Retired officer of the Indian Air Force

Air Marshal Raghunath Nambiar PVSM, AVSM, VM**
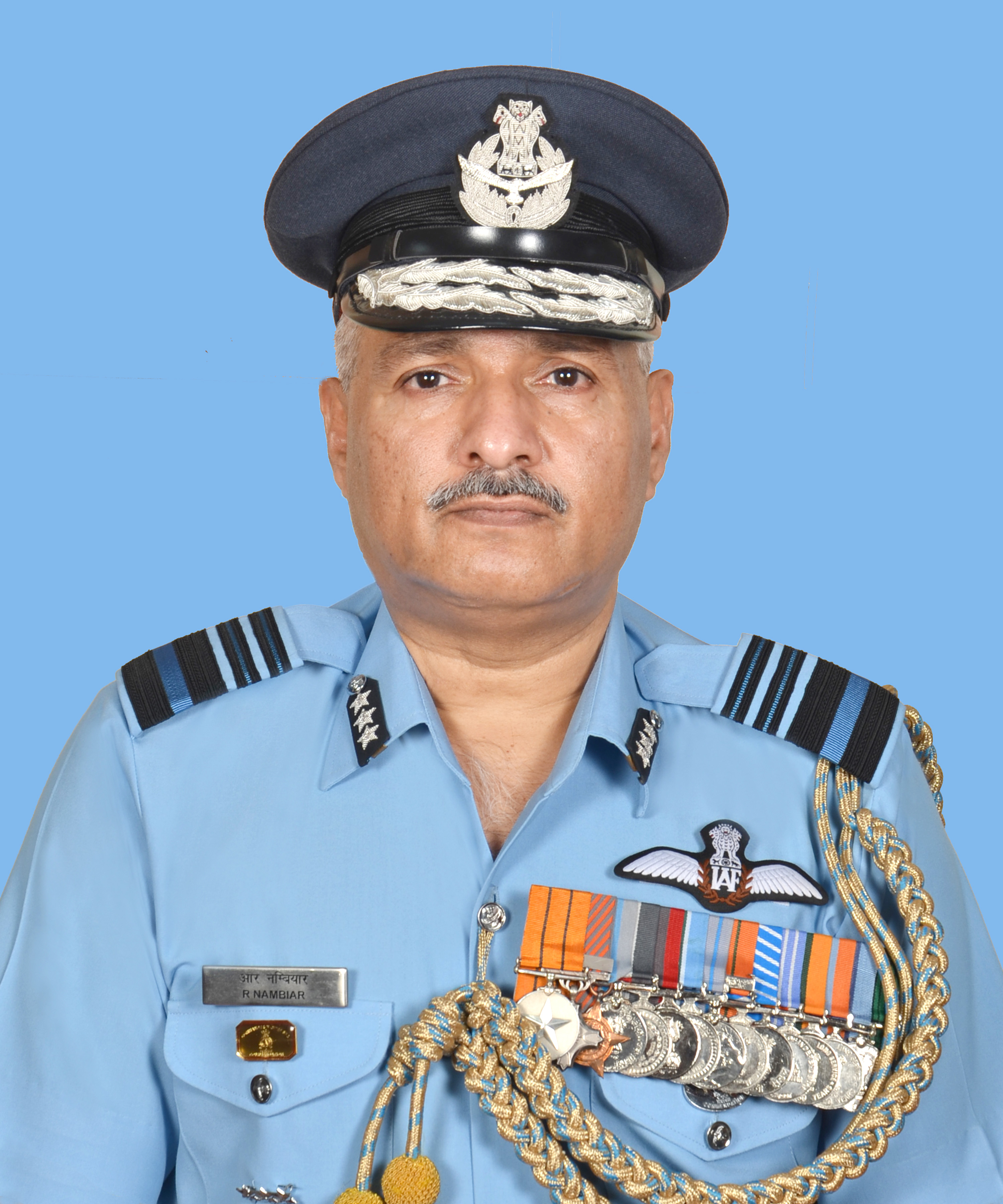
- Spouse: Luxmi
- Military career
- Allegiance: India
- Branch: Indian Air Force
- Service years: June 1981 - 31 October 2019
- Rank: Air Marshal
- Service number: 16378
- Commands: Western Air Command; Eastern Air Command; Deputy Chief of the Air Staff
- Awards: Param Vishisht Seva Medal; Ati Vishisht Seva Medal; Vayu Sena Medal (Bar)

Air Marshal Raghunath Nambiar, PVSM, AVSM, VM & Bar is a retired officer of the Indian Air Force. He served as Air Officer Commanding-in-Chief (AOC-in-C), Western Air Command from 1 March 2019 to 31 October 2019.

== Early life and education ==
Raghunath Nambiar's father, Padmanabhan Nambiar, was a Squadron Leader with the Indian Air Force. Nambiar is an alumnus of the National Defence Academy.

== Career ==
Nambiar was commissioned into the fighter stream in June 1981. He has clocked over 5,100 hours of flying experience among which 2,300 hours were on Mirage 2000 and has flown 42 different types of aircraft. He is an experimental test pilot, is a member of Society of Experimental Test Pilots and was a test pilot for the HAL Tejas project.

He has commanded the oldest squadron in the Indian Air Force, the No. 1 Squadron, and flew over 25 operational missions in a Mirage 2000 during the Kargil war. He was the first pilot to drop laser guided bombs for the Indian Air Force. He has held other command positions including Air Officer Commanding AFS Jamnagar; Air Defence Commander of Western Air Command and Deputy Chief of the Air Staff. He has held numerous staff appointments including Director of Space Applications at Air HQ; Chief Operations Officer of AFS Gwalior; Principle Director of Offensive Operations at Air HQ; Senior Air Staff Officer (SASO) of Southern Air Command; and Commandant of Aircraft System Testing Establishment (ASTE). He was also a former pilot and the commanding officer of the flight test squadron at ASTE. He was also posted at the Indian embassy in Israel as a defense attaché.

Nambiar assumed office of Air Officer Commanding-in-Chief, Eastern Air Command on 1 October 2018 following Air Marshal Anil Khosla's elevation to the post of Vice Chief of the Air Staff (VCAS).

He also served as Air Officer Commanding-in-Chief, Western Air Command. He assumed the office on 1 March 2019 following the retirement of Air Marshal Chandrashekharan Hari Kumar and served till his superannuation on 31 October 2019. Air Marshal Balakrishnan Suresh succeeded him.

== Awards and decorations ==
During his career, Nambiar has been awarded with numerous awards and decorations including two Vayu Sena Medals, one for Gallantry during the Kargil Operations and for flight testing the HAL Tejas (2002), the Ati Vishist Seva Medal in (2015), Param Vishisht Seva Medal in 2019, and commendations from the Chief of Air Staff (1991) and C-in-C of Strategic Force Command (2005).

Param Vishisht Seva Medal	Ati Vishisht Seva Medal	Vayu Sena Medal

== Personal life ==
Air Marshal Nambiar is married to Luxmi Nambiar. His son, Aswin Nambiar, is a commercial pilot.

Military offices
Preceded by Chandrashekharan Hari Kumar	Air Officer Commanding-in-Chief, Western Air Command; 1 March 2019 – 31 October 2019	Succeeded by Balakrishnan Suresh
Preceded by Anil Khosla	Air Officer Commanding-in-Chief, Eastern Air Command; 1 October 2018 – 28 February 2019	Succeeded by Rajiv Dayal Mathur
Preceded by Rakesh Kumar Singh Bhadauria	Deputy Chief of the Air Staff; 1 March 2017 – 30 September 2018	Succeeded by Vivek Ram Chaudhari
