= Vivek Ram Chaudhari =

27th Chief of the Air Staff (India) (born 1962)

Air Chief Marshal Vivek Ram Chaudhari PVSM AVSM VM ADC
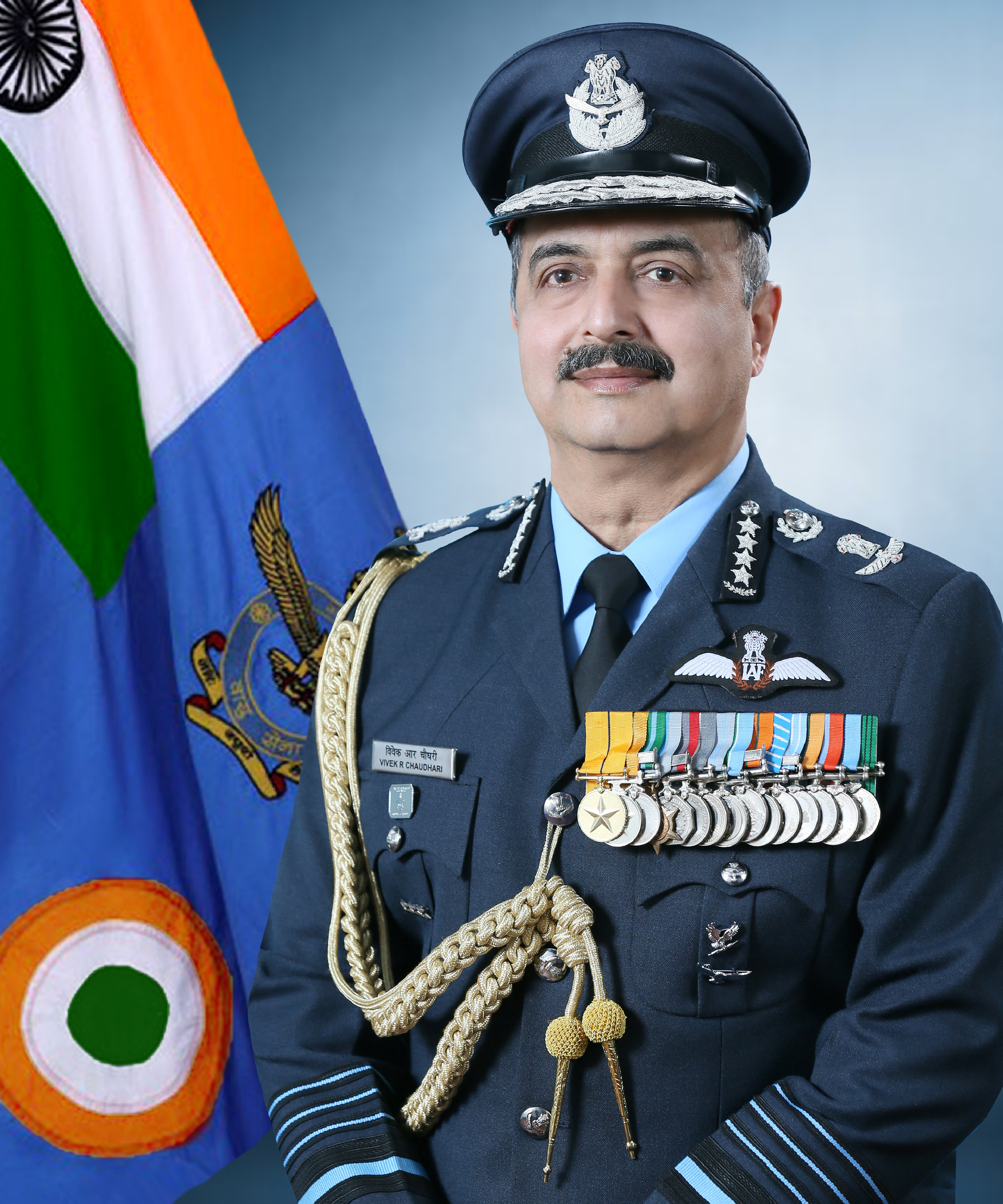
- Official portrait, 2021

27th Chief of the Air Staff
- In office 30 September 2021 – 30 September 2024
- President: Ram Nath Kovind; Droupadi Murmu
- Preceded by: R. K. S. Bhadauria
- Succeeded by: Amar Preet Singh

45th Vice Chief of the Air Staff
- In office 1 July 2021 – 30 September 2021
- Preceded by: Harjit Singh Arora
- Succeeded by: Sandeep Singh

Personal details
- Born: 4 September 1962 (age 64)
- Children: 2
- Parent: Rambhau Ganapat Chaudhari (Father)

Military service
- Allegiance: India
- Branch/service: Indian Air Force
- Years of service: 29 December 1982 - 30 September 2024
- Rank: Air Chief Marshal
- Unit: No. 28 Squadron
- Commands: Western Air Command; Lohegaon Air Force Station; 8 Forward Base Support Unit; No. 28 Squadron
- Battles/wars: Operation Meghdoot; Kargil war
- Service number: 16978
- Awards: Param Vishisht Seva Medal; Ati Vishisht Seva Medal; Vayu Sena Medal

Air Chief Marshal Vivek Ram Chaudhari, PVSM AVSM VM ADC is a retired four-star air officer of the Indian Air Force who served as the Chief of the Air Staff. He took over as the 27th Chief of Air Staff succeeding Air Chief Marshal Rakesh Kumar Singh Bhadauria on 30 September 2021. He previously served as the 45th Vice Chief of the Air Staff. He earlier served as the Air Officer Commanding-in-Chief Western Air Command and as the Deputy Chief of Air Staff.

== Early life and education ==
He was born to Rambhau Ganapat Chaudhari, his mother was a school headmistress.

- His grandfather was a teacher at the Zila Parishad school at Koli, a village in Hadgaon taluka. He studied in primary school at Nanded.

He subsequently moved to Pune and enrolled in a military school. He is an alumnus of the National Defence Academy (61st Course), the Air Force Academy and the Defence Services Staff College, Wellington (DSSC).

== Career ==
Air Chief Marshal Chaudhari was commissioned in the Indian Air Force as a fighter pilot on 29 December 1982 from the Air Force Academy, Dundigal. During his career spanning over four decades, he has held various staff and instructional appointments and served in a wide spectrum of terrain. He is a Category 'A' qualified flying instructor, and Instrument Rating Instructor and examiner. He has a flying experience of over 3800 hours on various fighter aircraft including MiG-21, MiG-23MF, MiG-29 and Su-30MKI. He was also a pioneer member of the Surya Kiran Aerobatic Display Team. As a fighter pilot, he flew operational missions during Operation Meghdoot and Operation Safed Sagar. He has commanded the MiG-29 squadron, No. 28 Squadron IAF at Jamnagar and the forward base in Awantipora in Jammu and Kashmir. He also served as the chief operations officer of the Srinagar Air Force Station.

=== Flag officer ===
As an Air commodore, he served as the Air assistant to the then Chief of Air Staff, Air Chief Marshal Pradeep Vasant Naik. He subsequently commanded the Lohegaon Air base in Pune. He has also served as an instructor at DSSC Wellington as well as Defence Services Command and Staff College at Lusaka, Zambia.

After promotion to Air Vice Marshal, he served as the Assistant Chief of Air Staff Operations (Air Defence) at Air headquarters and as the Deputy Commandant at the Air Force Academy, Dundigal. He subsequently was appointed the Assistant Chief of Air Staff (Personnel Officers). On 2 October 2018 he took over as the Deputy Chief of Air Staff at Air Headquarters, New Delhi. A year later, on 1 October 2019 he was appointed as Senior Air Staff Officer of the Eastern Air Command in Shillong.

On 1 August 2020, he took over as the Air Officer Commanding-in-Chief Western Air Command succeeding Air Marshal Balakrishnan Suresh. A year later, on 1 July 2021 he took over as the 45th Vice Chief of the Air Staff succeeding Air Marshal Harjit Singh Arora who superannuated from service on 30 June 2021.

=== Chief of Air Staff ===
On 21 September 2021, the Government of India appointed Air Marshal Vivek Ram Chaudhari as the next Chief of the Air Staff. On 30 September 2021, he took over as the 27th Chief of the Air Staff succeeding Air Chief Marshal Rakesh Kumar Singh Bhadauria. He retired on 30 September 2024 after four decades of service and was succeeded by Air Marshal Amar Preet Singh.

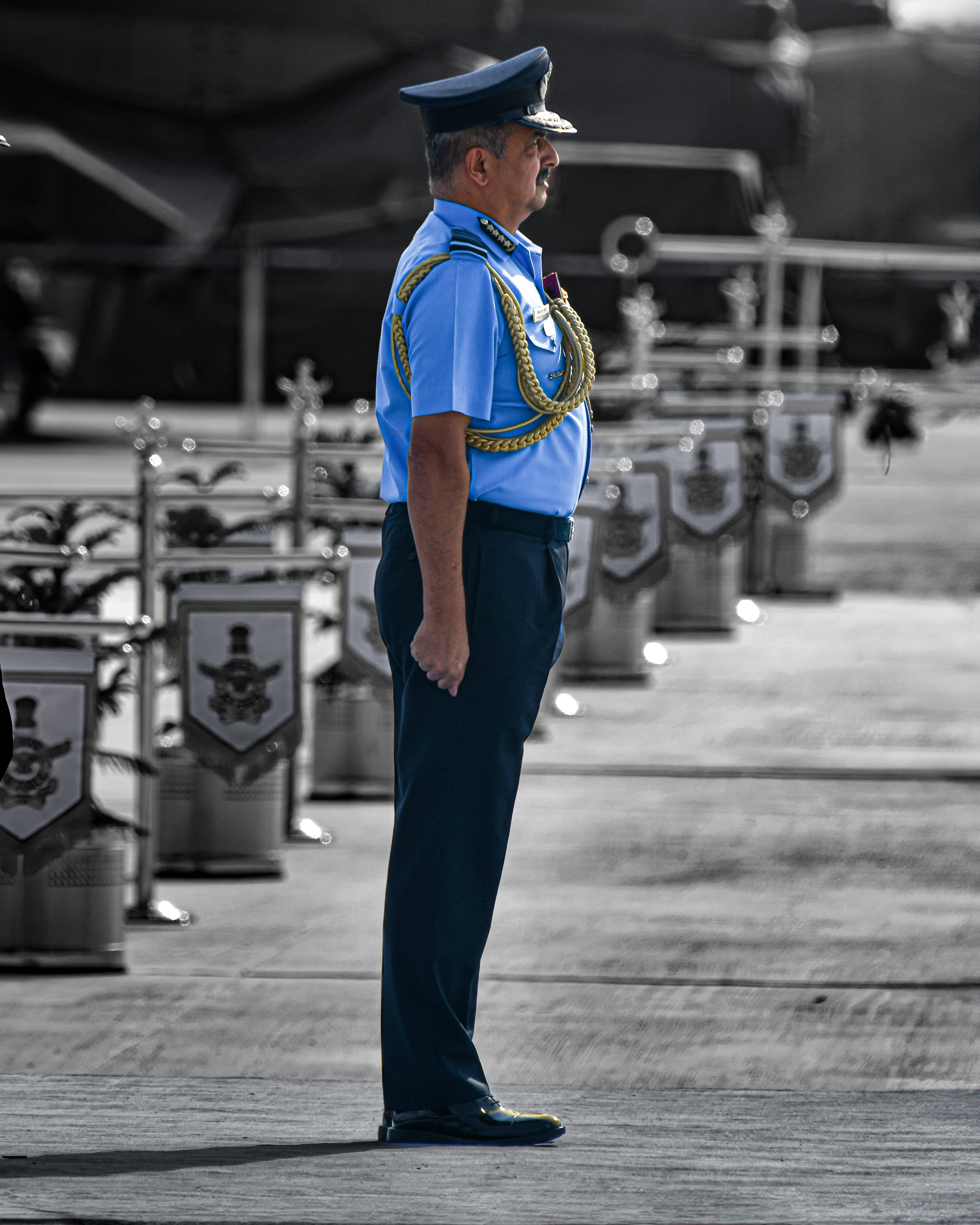
CAS VR Chaudhari at 91st Air Force Day Parade

== Honours and decorations ==
During his career, he has been awarded the Vayu Sena Medal in 2004, the Ati Vishisht Seva Medal in 2015 and the Param Vishisht Seva Medal in 2021 for his service.

Param Vishisht Seva Medal		Ati Vishisht Seva Medal	
Vayu Sena Medal	Samanya Seva Medal		Operation Vijay Star
Special Service Medal	Siachen Glacier Medal	Operation Vijay Medal	Operation Parakram Medal
Sainya Seva Medal	High Altitude Service Medal	Videsh Seva Medal	75th Anniversary of Independence Medal
50th Independence Anniversary Medal	30 Years Long Service Medal	20 Years Long Service Medal	9 Years Long Service Medal

== Personal life ==
He is married to Neeta Chaudhari. They have two sons. His son Mihir Chaudhary is also an officer in Indian Air Force.

== Dates of rank ==
Insignia	Rank	Component	Date of rank
	Pilot Officer	Indian Air Force	29 December 1982
	Flying Officer	Indian Air Force	29 December 1983
	Flight Lieutenant	Indian Air Force	21 December 1987
	Squadron Leader	Indian Air Force	29 December 1993
	Wing Commander	Indian Air Force	17 May 1999
	Group Captain	Indian Air Force	1 March 2006
	Air Commodore	Indian Air Force	1 September 2009
	Air Vice Marshal	Indian Air Force	1 April 2013
	Air Marshal	Indian Air Force	1 October 2018 (AOC-in-C from 1 August 2020)
	Air Chief Marshal (CAS)	Indian Air Force	30 September 2021

Military offices
Preceded by R. K. S. Bhadauria	Chief of Air Staff; 30 September 2021 - 30 September 2024	Succeeded by Amar Preet Singh
Preceded by Harjit Singh Arora	Vice Chief of Air Staff; 1 July 2021 – 30 September 2021	Succeeded by Sandeep Singh
Preceded by Balakrishnan Suresh	Air Officer Commanding-in-Chief, Western Air Command; 1 August 2020 – 30 June 2021	Succeeded by Balabhadra Radha Krishna
Preceded by Sandeep Singh	Senior Air Staff Officer Eastern Air Command; 1 October 2019 – 31 July 2020	Succeeded by Gurcharan Singh Bedi
Preceded by Raghunath Nambiar	Deputy Chief of the Air Staff; 1 October 2018 – 30 September 2019	Succeeded by Sandeep Singh
