= Surendra Kumar Ghotia =

Indian Air Force officer

Air Marshal Surendra Kumar Ghotia PVSM, VSM
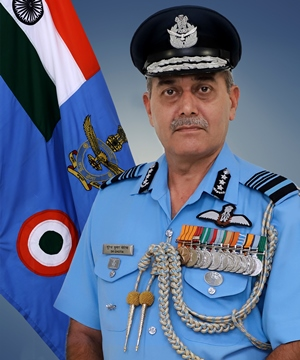
- Military career
- Allegiance: India
- Branch: Indian Air Force
- Service years: December 1981 - 30 April 2021
- Rank: Air Marshal
- Service number: 16575
- Commands: South Western Air Command; Training Command
- Awards: Param Vishisht Seva Medal; Vishisht Seva Medal

Air Marshal Surendra Kumar Ghotia, PVSM, VSM is a retired officer of the Indian Air Force. He served as the Air Officer Commanding-in-Chief (AOC-in-C), South Western Air Command till 30 April 2021. He assumed the office on 1 October 2019 following Air Marshal Harjit Singh Arora's elevation to Vice Chief of the Air Staff. He superannuated on 30 April 2021 after almost 40 years of service. He was succeeded by Air Marshal Sandeep Singh

== Early life and education ==
Ghotia is an alumnus of National Defence Academy Khadakwasla. He has undergone Air Staff course at Defence Services Staff College Wellington as well as Higher Air Command course at College of Air Warfare Secunderabad. He holds two master's degrees.

== Career ==
Ghotia was commissioned in the Indian Air Force as a fighter pilot in December 1981. He has over 3000 hours of flying experience on different aircraft. He is also a qualified instructor with instructional experience of more than 1000 hours.

His various field appointments include commanding a fighter squadron, chief operations officer, and station commander of a forward air base in South Western Air Command. He has served in a number of staff appointments including director intelligence at Air Headquarters, staff officer of fighter operations in Western Air Command, principal director training (flying) at Air Headquarters, assistant chief of air staff (intelligence), air officer commanding of COBRA group, and air attache at embassy of India in Paris.

Ghotia assumed office of Senior Air Staff Officer, Training Command on 20 June 2016 and served in that capacity till his appointment as AOC-in-C, Training Command.

He served as Air Officer Commanding-in-Chief (AOC-in-C), Training Command from 1 May 2019 succeeding Air Marshal Rakesh Kumar Singh Bhadauria, to 30 September 2019.

== Honours and decorations ==
During his career, Ghotia has been awarded the commendation by Air Officer Commanding-in-chief, Western Air Command in 1994, commendation by Chief of Air Staff in 1998, Vishisht Seva Medal (VSM) in 2007, and Param Vishisht Seva Medal (PVSM) in January 2020 for his service.

Param Vishisht Seva Medal	Vishisht Seva Medal

== Personal life ==
He is married to Nirmala Ghotia who served as the President of Air Force Wives Welfare Association (Regional), and they have two daughters.

Military offices
Preceded by Harjit Singh Arora	Air Officer Commanding-in-Chief, South Western Air Command; 1 October 2019 – 30 April 2021	Succeeded by Sandeep Singh
Preceded by Rakesh Kumar Singh Bhadauria	Air Officer Commanding-in-Chief, Training Command; 1 May 2019 – 30 September 2019	Succeeded by Arvindra Singh Butola
