= Birender Singh Dhanoa =

25th Air Chief Marshal of the Indian Air Force

Air Chief Marshal Birender Singh Dhanoa PVSM, AVSM, YSM, VM, ADC
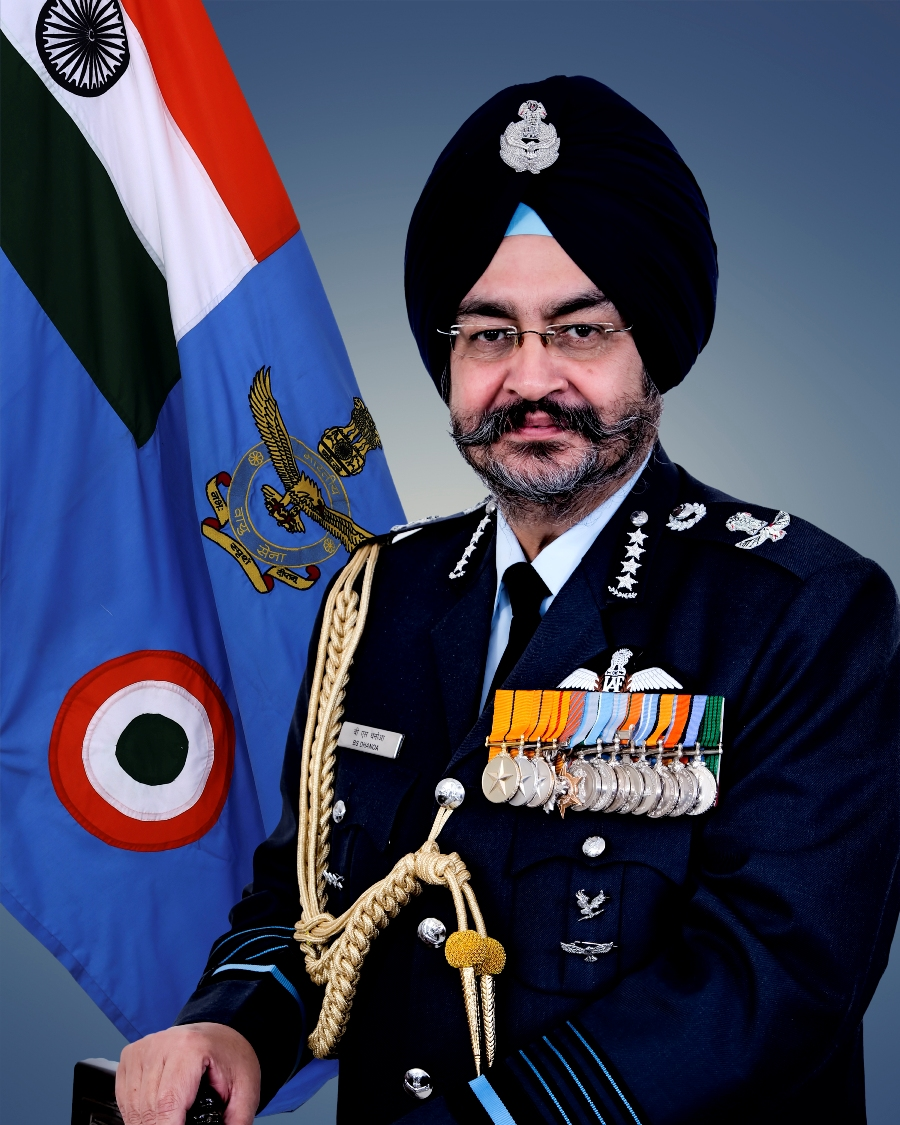
- Official portrait, 2016

56th Chairman of the Chiefs of Staff Committee
- In office 31 May 2019 – 27 September 2019
- President: Ram Nath Kovind
- Preceded by: Sunil Lanba
- Succeeded by: Bipin Rawat

22nd Chief of the Air Staff
- In office 31 December 2016 – 30 September 2019
- President: Pranab Mukherjee; Ram Nath Kovind
- Preceded by: Arup Raha
- Succeeded by: Rakesh Kumar Singh Bhadauria

40th Vice Chief of the Air Staff
- In office 31 May 2015 – 31 December 2016
- Preceded by: Ravi Kant Sharma
- Succeeded by: Shirish Baban Deo

Personal details
- Born: 7 September 1957 (age 68) Deoghar, Bihar, India
- Spouse: Kamalpreet Kaur Dhanoa
- Children: 1

Military service
- Allegiance: India
- Branch/service: Indian Air Force
- Years of service: June 1978 - 30 September 2019
- Rank: Air Chief Marshal
- Unit: No. 17 Squadron
- Commands: Chairman, Chiefs of Staff Committee; Chief of the Air Staff; South Western Air Command
- Battles/wars: Kargil War; Balakot Airstrike
- Service number: 15405
- Awards: Param Vishisht Seva Medal; Ati Vishisht Seva Medal; Yudh Seva Medal; Vayu Sena Medal

Air Chief Marshal Birender Singh Dhanoa, PVSM, AVSM, YSM, VM, ADC is an Indian air force officer who was the 22nd Chief of the Air Staff of the Indian Air Force and served from 31 December 2016 to 30 September 2019. Dhanoa also served as the Chairman of the Chiefs of Staff Committee.

As of July 2021, Dhanoa is serving as a non-executive and independent director at Hero MotoCorp.

== Early life and education ==
Dhanoa was born in Deoghar in the Indian state of Bihar (now Jharkhand) to Sukhdev Kaur and Sorain Singh in a Jat Sikh family. His ancestral village is Gharuan in the state of Punjab near Chandigarh and Mohali.

Dhanoa's father, Sorain Singh, an IAS officer, served as the Chief Secretary to the governments of Punjab and Bihar during the 1980s and later as an advisor to the Punjab state governor and as an Election Commissioner of India. His grandfather, Capt. Sant Singh, had fought in World War II as a captain of the British Indian Army.

Dhanoa attended St. Xavier's School, Ranchi. He then studied at St. George's College, Mussoorie, from 1968 to 1969. He thereon joined Rashtriya Indian Military College, Dehradun, and later graduated from National Defence Academy, Pune. He also attended a staff course at the Defence Services Staff College, Wellington, Tamil Nadu, in 1992.

== Career ==
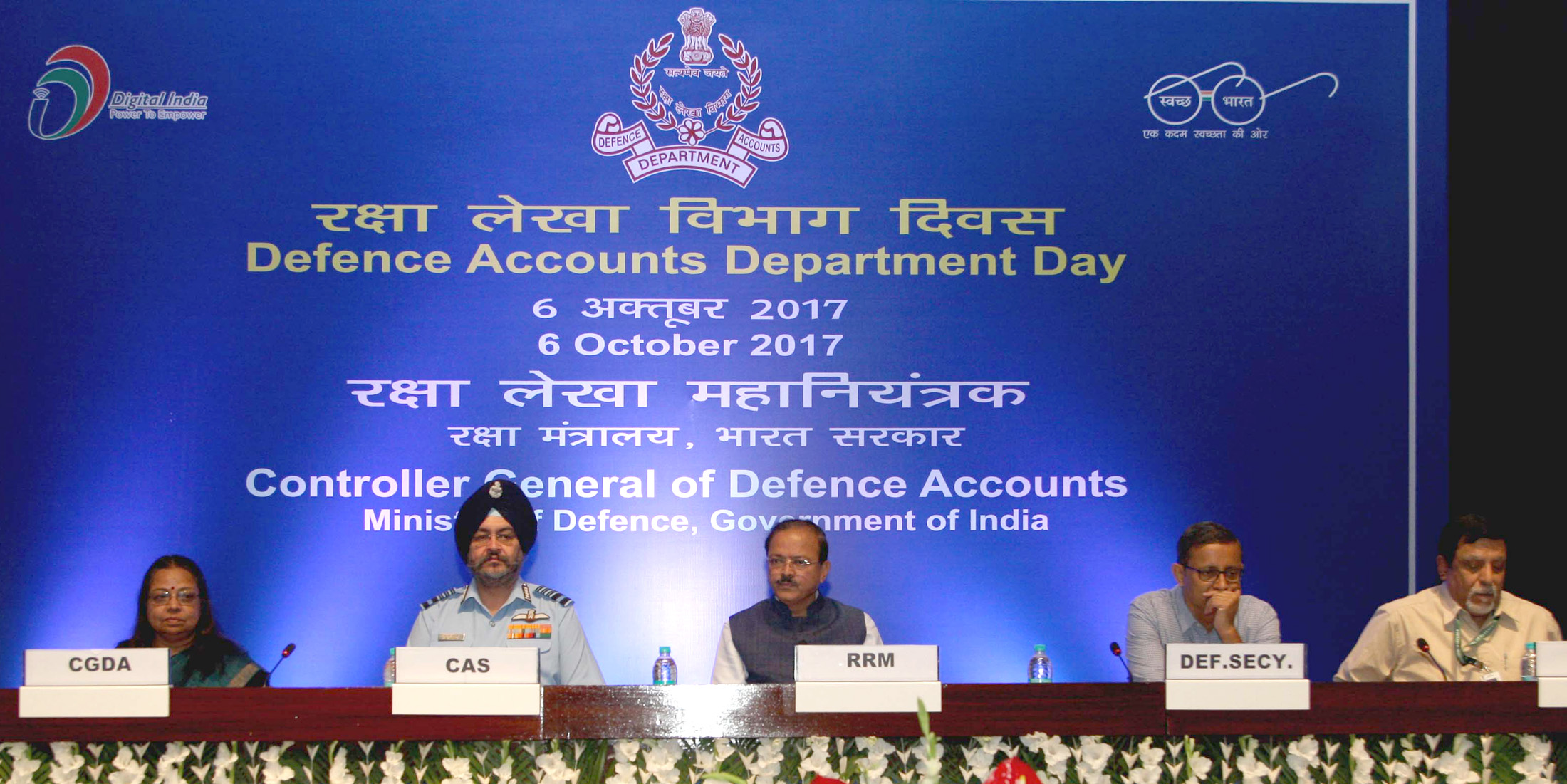
Air Chief Marshal B. S. Dhanoa with Minister of State for Defence Dr. Subhash Bhamre and Defence Secretary Sanjay Mitra, Controller General of Defence Accounts Veena Prasad and Financial Adviser (Defence Services) at the 271st Annual Day celebrations of Defence Accounts Department (DAD).

Dhanoa was commissioned into the fighter stream of the Indian Air Force in June 1978. He has flown various types of fighter jets and is a qualified flying instructor. He has flown fighter aircraft across the spectrum including HJT-16 Kiran, MiG-21, SEPECAT Jaguar, MiG-29 and Su-30MKI. He held several key operational and administrative appointments in his 41 years of career including Director Targeting Cell at Air Headquarters, Director Fighter Operations & War Planning at Headquarters Western Air Command, Assistant Chief of Air Staff (Intelligence) at Air Headquarters, Senior Air Staff Officer of Eastern and Western Air Command and Air Officer Commanding-in-Chief of South Western Air Command (1 November - 31 May 2015). He has held instructional appointments of Senior Air Instructor and Chief Air Instructor at Defence Services Staff College, Wellington and leader of an Indian Air Force Training Team abroad.

=== Kargil Conflict ===
Dhanoa was Commanding Officer of a front line ground attack fighter squadron during the Kargil Conflict in 1999. Under his leadership the squadron devised innovative methods of night bombing at high altitudes which had never been attempted before. His squadron was adjudged the best fighter squadron of HQ WAC. He was awarded Yudh Seva Medal (YSM) and Vayu Sena Medal (VM) for his gallant actions in this conflict.

Before assuming the office of Vice Chief of the Air Staff at Air HQ from Air Marshal Ravi Kant Sharma on 1 June 2015, he was the Air Officer Commanding-in-Chief of the South Western Air Command. Air Marshal Ravinder Kumar Dhir succeeded him as the AOC-in-C of South Western Air Command.

On 17 December 2016, the Government of India designated Air Marshal Dhanoa as the Chief of Staff of the Indian Air Force.

=== Bilateral visits as CAS ===
| Country | Date | Purpose | References |
|---|---|---|---|
2017
| France | 17 - 20 July | Bilateral discussions with senior military officials of the French Armed Forces and representatives of Military aviation industry; Visited the headquarters of French Air Force, few operational air bases and Indian Rafale PMT Infrastructure | |
| Australia | 19 - 22 September | Bilateral discussions with senior military officials of the Royal Australian Air Force; Visited the headquarters of Royal Australian Air Force and a few operational air bases | |
| United States | 26 - 28 September | Attend and address the Pacific Air Chiefs symposium at Hawaii | |
| Vietnam | 30 October - 3 November | Bilateral discussions with senior military officials of the Vietnam People's Air Force and Air Defence (VPAF); Visited the headquarters of Headquarters of Vietnam People's Air Force and Air Defence (VPAF) and some operational air bases | |
| Sri Lanka | 11 - 14 December | Review the commissioning, award of wings and passing out parade of the Sri Lankan Air Force Academy | |
2018
| Israel | 21 - 24 May | Attend 70th anniversary celebration of Israeli Air Force; Met Chiefs and Senior Commanders of numerous Air Forces; Visited a few operational air bases | |
| Brazil | 4 - 7 June | Met senior functionaries; Visited operational and training units | |
| United Kingdom | 9 - 15 July | Attend RAF Annual Air Power Conference and Royal International Air Tattoo | |
| Myanmar | 3 - 8 September | Meet senior functionaries; Visit operational establishments | |
| Malaysia | 3 - 8 September | Meet senior functionaries; Visit operational establishments | |
2019
| Thailand | 26-28 August | represented India at 2019 Indo Pacific Chiefs of Defense (CHOD) Conference being held in Bangkok | |

== Awards and medals ==
Dhanoa has been awarded several medals: the Param Vishisht Seva Medal (2016), the Ati Vishisht Seva Medal (2015), the Yudh Seva Medal (1999), and the Vayu Sena Medal (1999). He was also appointed as Honorary ADC to the President of India on 1 August 2015.

| Param Vishisht Seva Medal | Ati Vishisht Seva Medal | Yudh Seva Medal | Vayu Sena Medal |
| Operation Vijay Medal | Operation Parakram Medal | Meritorious Service Medal | Sainya Seva Medal |
| 50th Anniversary of Independence Medal | 30 Years Long Service Medal | 20 Years Long Service Medal | 9 Years Long Service Medal |

Military offices
| Preceded by Admiral Sunil Lanba | Chairman of the Chiefs of Staff Committee; 30 May 2019 - 27 September 2019 | Succeeded by General Bipin Rawat |
| Preceded by Arup Raha | Chief of the Air Staff (India); 31 December 2016 - 30 September 2019 | Succeeded by Rakesh Kumar Singh Bhadauria |
| Preceded by Ravi Kant Sharma | Vice Chief of the Air Staff (India); 31 May 2015 - 31 December 2016 | Succeeded by Shirish Baban Deo |
| Preceded by Daljit Singh | Air Officer Commanding-in-Chief, South Western Air Command; 1 November 2014 - 31 May 2015 | Succeeded by Ravinder Kumar Dhir |
