= Balakrishnan Suresh =

Indian air marshal

Air Marshal Balakrishnan Suresh PVSM, AVSM, VM, ADC
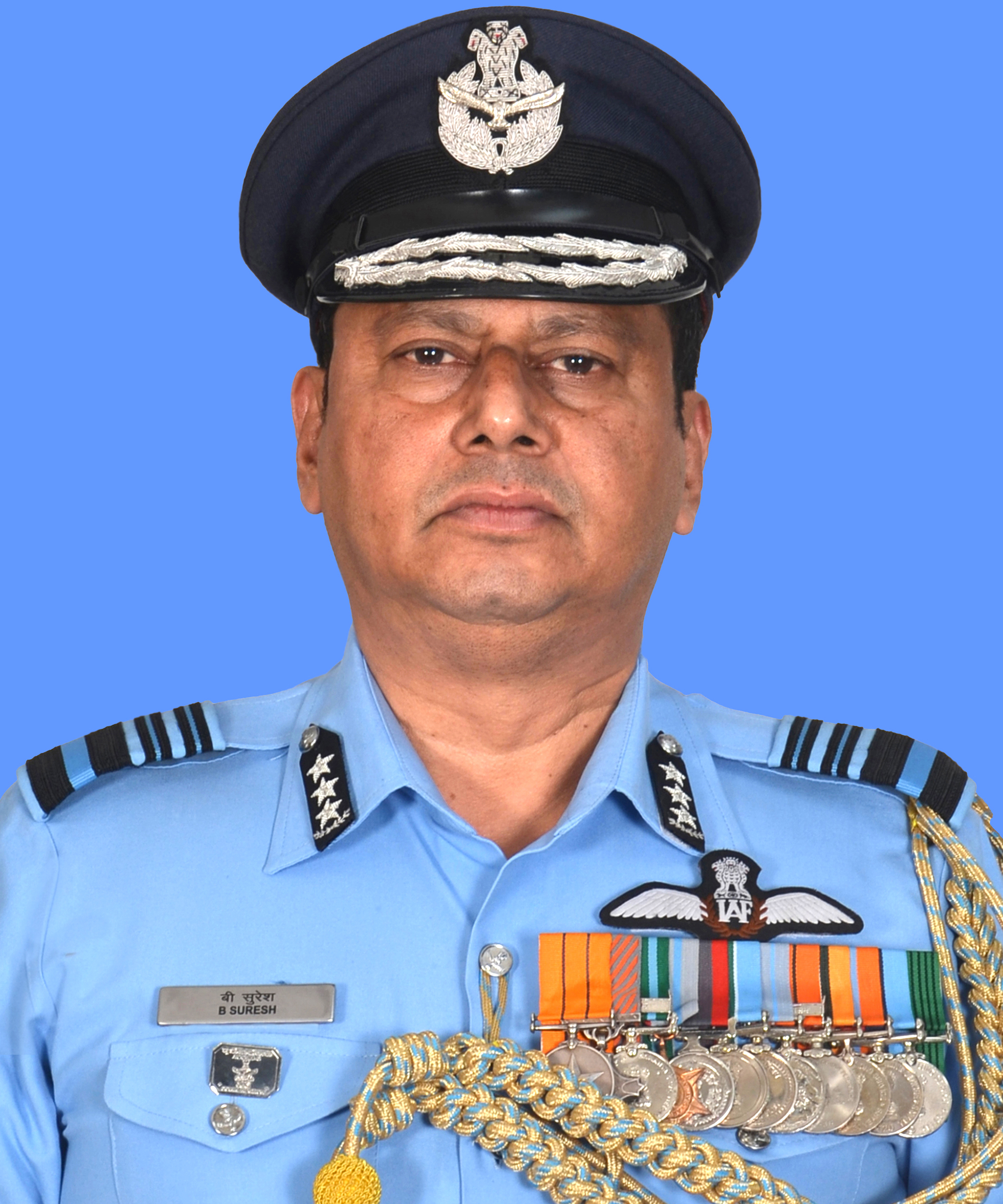
- Born: Thiruvananthapuram, Kerala, India
- Military career
- Allegiance: India
- Branch: Indian Air Force
- Service years: 13 December 1980 - 31 July 2020
- Rank: Air Marshal
- Service number: 16206
- Commands: Western Air Command; Southern Air Command; Air Officer in Charge of Personnel
- Awards: Param Vishisht Seva Medal; Ati Vishisht Seva Medal; Vayu Sena Medal

Air Marshal Balakrishnan Suresh PVSM, AVSM, VM, ADC is a retired officer of the Indian Air Force. He served as Air Officer Commanding-in-Chief (AOC-in-C), Western Air Command from 1 November 2019 following superannuation of Air Marshal Raghunath Nambiar, till the day of his retirement on 31 July 2020.

== Early life and education ==
Air Marshal Suresh is an alumnus of the Rashtriya Indian Military College in Dehradun, National Defence Academy, in Khadakwasla, Air Force Academy (India) in Dundigal and the Defence Services Staff College in Wellington. He is a graduate of the Tactics and Air Combat Development Establishment, and a post-graduate from Cranfield University in Shrivenham, United Kingdom.

== Career ==
Air Marshal Suresh was commissioned as a fighter pilot in the Indian Air Force on 13 December 1980. He commanded No. 2 Squadron 'The Winged Arrows' as a Wing Commander and Tactics and Air Combat Development Establishment (TACDE) as a Group Captain. Suresh also commanded a strategic fighter base as an Air Commodore.

Air Marshal Suresh has held other positions including joint director and director for air staff inspection, Director Operations (Joint Planning), directing staff and commandant of TACDE, air assistant to the Chief of the Air Staff, Assistant Chief of the Air Staff Operations (Air Defence), senior air staff officer at the Western Air Command and Air Officer-in-Chief Personnel at Air Headquarters.

He served as Air Officer Commanding-in-Chief, Southern Air Command from 1 August 2018 taking over from Rakesh Kumar Singh Bhadauria, till 30 October 2019. From there he moved to New Delhi and on 1 November 2019 took over command of Western Air Command as its Air Officer Commanding-in-Chief. He served as the AOC in C of the command until his superannuation on 31 July 2020.

== Awards and medals ==
Air Marshal Suresh was awarded Vayu Sena Medal in 2001 and Ati Vishisht Seva Medal as a Group Captain in 2005. He is probably one of youngest officers to be awarded the presidential award of AVSM as a Group Captain. He was awarded Param Vishisht Seva Medal in 2019. He was appointed as Aide-de-camp of the president on 1 February 2019.

Param Vishisht Seva Medal	Ati Vishisht Seva Medal	Vayu Sena Medal

== Personal life ==
Air Marshal Suresh is married to Radha Suresh and they have a son and a daughter.

Military offices
Preceded by Raghunath Nambiar	Air Officer Commanding-in-Chief, Western Air Command; 1 November 2019 - 31 July 2020	Succeeded by Vivek Ram Chaudhari
Preceded by Rakesh Kumar Singh Bhadauria	Air Officer Commanding-in-Chief, Southern Air Command; 1 August 2018 - 30 October 2019	Succeeded by Amit Tiwari
