= Harjit Singh Arora =

Indian air marshal (1961–2023)

Air Marshal Harjit Singh Arora PVSM, AVSM, ADC
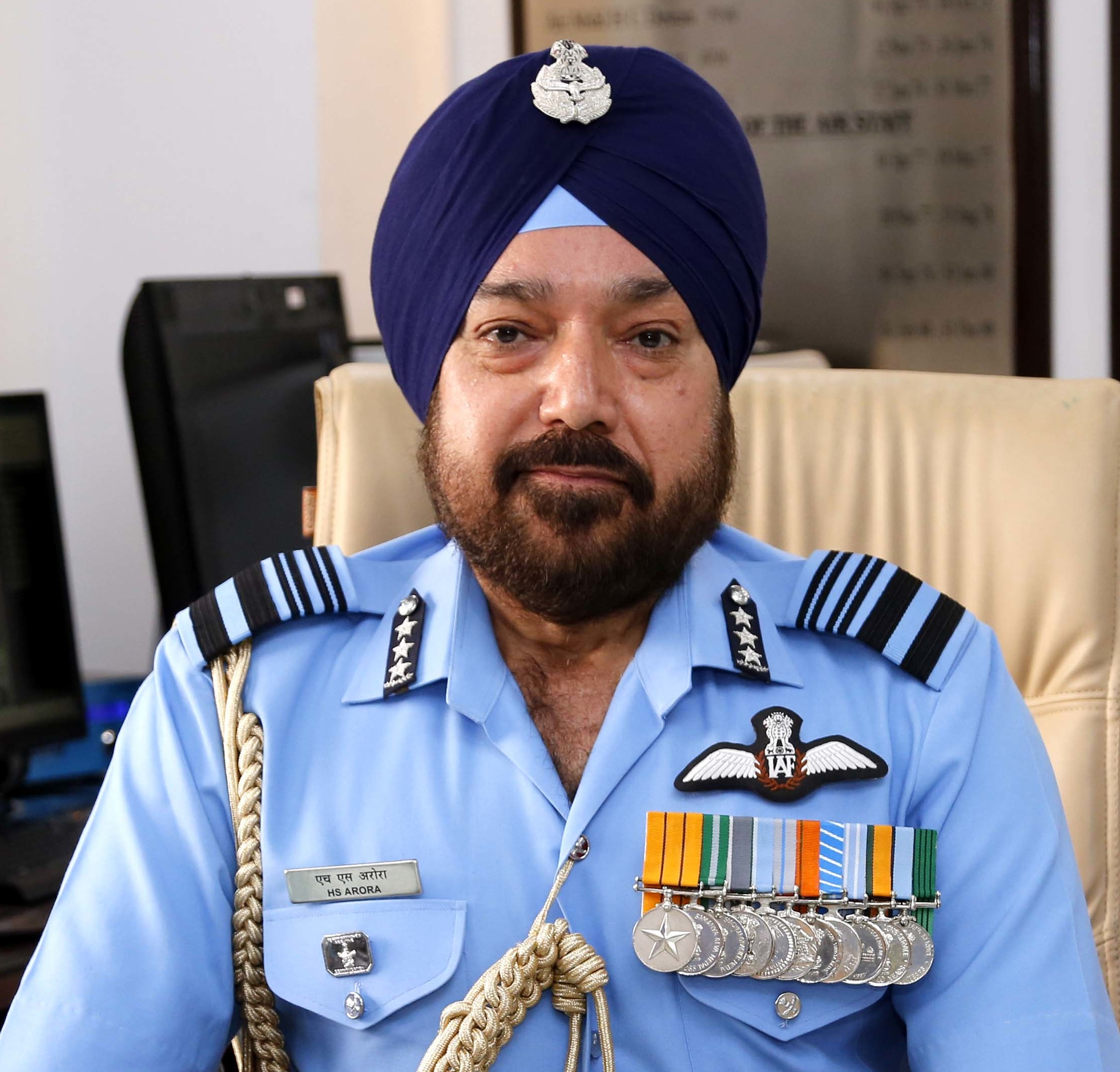
- Arora in 2019

44th Vice Chief of the Air Staff
- In office 1 October 2019 – 30 June 2021
- Preceded by: Rakesh Kumar Singh Bhadauria
- Succeeded by: Vivek Ram Chaudhari

Personal details
- Born: 25 June 1961
- Died: 21 January 2023 (aged 61) New Delhi, India
- Spouse: Baljeet Arora
- Children: 2 sons

Military service
- Allegiance: India
- Branch/service: Indian Air Force
- Years of service: December 1981– June 2021
- Rank: Air Marshal
- Commands: Vice Chief of the Air Staff; South Western Air Command; Director General Air Operations; Director General of Inspection and Safety
- Service number: 16557
- Awards: Param Vishisht Seva Medal; Ati Vishisht Seva Medal

Air Marshal Harjit Singh Arora PVSM, AVSM, ADC (25 June 1961 – 21 January 2023) was an officer of the Indian Air Force and served as the Vice Chief of the Air Staff from 1 October 2019 to 30 June 2021. He was succeeded by Air Marshal Vivek Ram Chaudhari.

== Early life and education ==
Arora was an alumnus of the Defence Services Staff College, Wellington and the National Defence College, New Delhi. He graduated from the Tactics and Air Combat Development Establishment in Gwalior. He also had an M. Phil. in defence and strategic studies.

== Career ==
Arora was commissioned as a fighter pilot in the Indian Air Force in December 1981. He had flying experience of over 2600 hours on Mig-21, Mig-29, and also helicopters.

Arora has commanded a Mig-21 squadron and then Air Defence Direction Center as a Group Captain in the southwestern sector. He has also commanded 45 Squadron as a wing commander. He has held other posts including air officer commanding of the Adampur Air Force Station, air defence commander at Western Air Command Headquarters, air defence commander at Eastern Air Command Headquarters, directing staff at Tactics and Air Combat Development Establishment and as a flying inspector in the Directorate of Air Staff Inspection. He also served as a defence attaché at the Indian embassy at Bangkok from 2006 to 2009.

Arora served as Air Officer Commanding-in-Chief (AOC in C), South Western Air Command from 30 September 2018 after superannuation of Air Marshal Ravinder Kumar Dhir, to 30 September 2019. He was succeeded by Air Marshal Surendra Kumar Ghotia.

Arora was appointed the Vice Chief of Air Staff on 28 September 2019 following elevation of Air Marshal Rakesh Kumar Singh Bhaduria as Chief of Air Staff.

== Later life and death ==
Arora superannuated on 30 June 2021 after 39 years of service. Arora died on 21 January 2023, at the age of 61.

== Honours and decorations ==
In his career of over 38 years, Arora was awarded the Ati Vishisht Seva Medal in January 2011 and the Param Vishisht Seva Medal in January 2020.

| Param Vishisht Seva Medal | Ati Vishisht Seva Medal |

== Personal life ==
Arora was married to Baljeet; the couple had two sons.

Military offices
| Preceded by Rakesh Kumar Singh Bhadauria | Vice Chief of Air Staff; 1 October 2019 – 30 June 2021 | Succeeded by Vivek Ram Chaudhari |
| Preceded by Ravinder Kumar Dhir | Air Officer Commanding-in-Chief, South Western Air Command; 30 September 2018 – 30 September 2019 | Succeeded by Surendra Kumar Ghotia |
| Preceded by Anil Khosla | Director General Air Operations; 22 August 2016 – 30 September 2018 | Succeeded by Amit Dev |
| Preceded by Karath Padmadass Nair | Director General (Flight Inspection & Safety); 1 December 2015 – 30 June 2016 | Succeeded by Anil Khosla |
