= R. K. S. Bhadauria =

Indian retired Chief of the Air Staff

Air Chief Marshal Rakesh Kumar Singh Bhadauria PVSM AVSM VM ADC
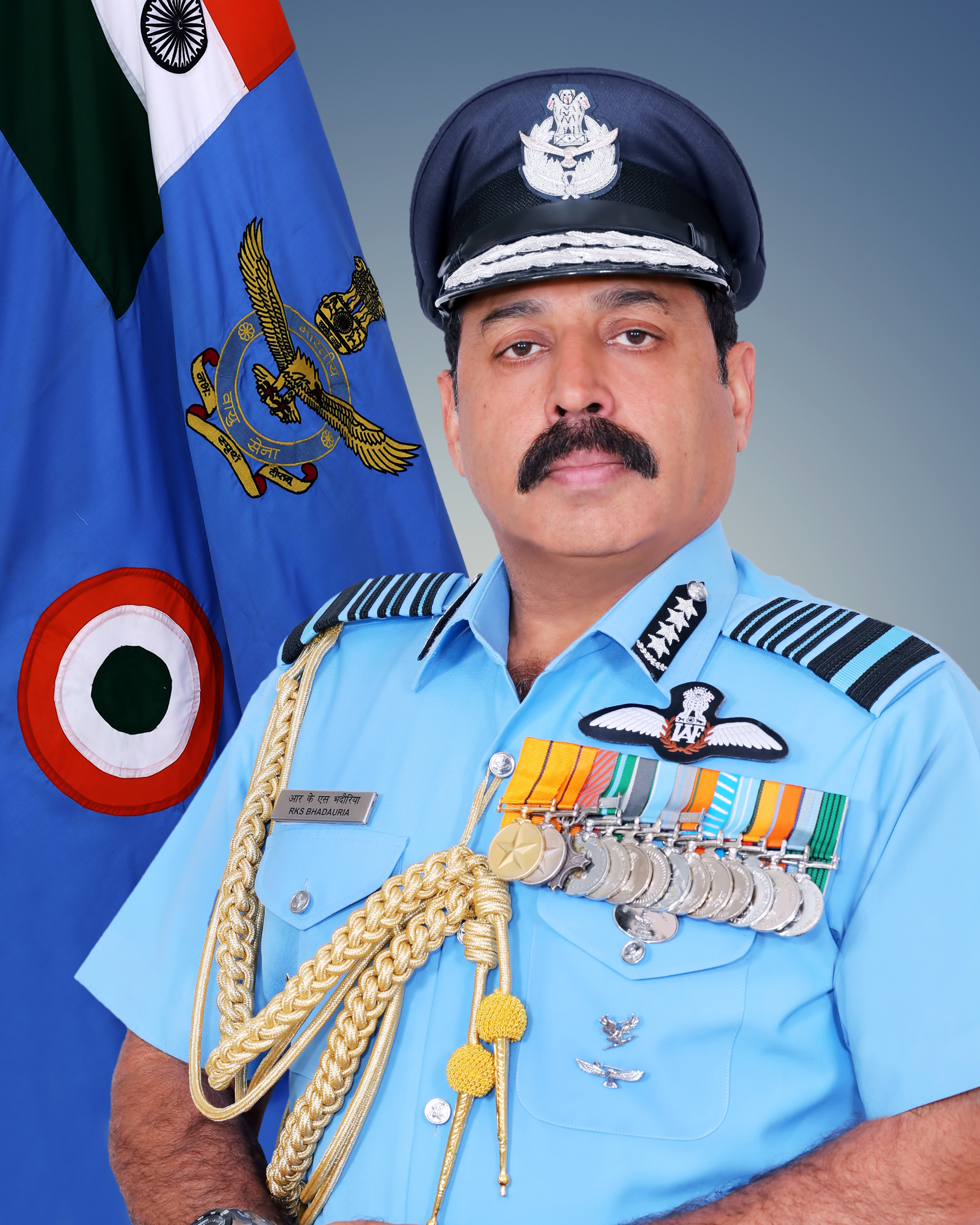
- Official portrait, 2019

23rd Chief of the Air Staff
- In office 30 September 2019 – 30 September 2021
- President: Ram Nath Kovind
- Preceded by: Birender Singh Dhanoa
- Succeeded by: Vivek Ram Chaudhari

43rd Vice Chief of the Air Staff
- In office 1 May 2019 – 30 September 2019
- Preceded by: Anil Khosla
- Succeeded by: Harjit Singh Arora

Personal details
- Born: 15 September 1959 (age 67) Korath, Agra, Uttar Pradesh, India
- Party: Bharatiya Janata Party (2024‍–‍present)
- Spouse: Asha Bhadauria

Military service
- Allegiance: India
- Branch/service: Indian Air Force
- Years of service: 15 June 1980 - 30 September 2021
- Rank: Air Chief Marshal
- Unit: No. 23 Squadron
- Commands: Chief of the Air Staff; Vice Chief of the Air Staff; Training Command; Southern Air Command; Deputy Chief of the Air Staff
- Service number: 16026
- Awards: Param Vishisht Seva Medal; Ati Vishisht Seva Medal; Vayu Sena Medal

Rakesh Kumar Singh Bhadauria (born 15 September 1959), is a retired Indian Air Force officer, who served as the Chief of the Air Staff of the Indian Air Force, having assumed office on 30 September 2019 after the retirement of Air Chief Marshal Birender Singh Dhanoa. He retired on 30 September 2021 and was succeeded by Air Chief Marshal Vivek Ram Chaudhari.

== Early life and education ==
Bhadauria was born in Korath, a village of tahsil Bah District Agra, to a Rajput family. His father, Suraj Pal Singh Bhadauria, too served in the Indian Air Force as a Senior Non Commissioned Officer and retired with the rank of Master Warrant Officer. Bhadauria is an alumnus of Defence Services Command and Staff College Bangladesh, National Defence Academy, Pune and holds a Masters in Defence studies from Command and Staff College.

== Career ==
Bhadauria was commissioned into the fighter stream of the Indian Air Force on 15 June 1980 with the Sword of Honour. He has clocked over 4,250 hours of flying and has experience on 26 different types of fighter jets and transport aircraft. He held several key operational and administrative appointments at various stages of his service including Commander of a Jaguar Squadron at a front line base in South-Western sector; Commanding Officer of Flight Test Squadron at Aircraft and System Testing Establishment; Chief Test Pilot and Project Director of National Flight Test Centre on the Tejas LCA project; Air Attache in Moscow; Assistant Chief of the Air Staff (Projects); Commandant of the National Defence Academy; Senior Air Staff Officer at Central Air Command and Deputy Chief of the Air Staff (1 January 2016 - 28 February 2017). He is also an experimental Test Pilot, a Category A qualified Flying Instructor and a Pilot Attack Instructor.

Bhadauria served as Air Officer Commanding-in-Chief (AOC-in-C), Southern Air Command from 1 March 2017, succeeding Air Marshal Sunderraman Neelakantan, to 1 August 2018.

He also served as Air Officer Commanding-in-Chief (AOC-in-C), Training Command from 1 August 2018 after retirement of Air Marshal S R K Nair, and held the office till his elevation to the Vice Chief of the Air Staff.

He took office of Vice Chief of the Air Staff on 1 May 2019 after the retirement of Air Marshal Anil Khosla.

On 19 September 2019 he was appointed as the Chief of Air Staff. He retired on 30 September 2021.

== Political career ==
On 24 March 2024, he joined the Bharatiya Janata Party in the presence of Vinod Tawde, Vishal Singh and Anurag Thakur.

== Personal life ==
His father Honorary Flight Lieutenant (MWO) Suraj Pal Singh Bhadauria was also from Indian Air Force and a recipient of Vishisht Seva Medal

== Awards and decorations ==
During 41 years of his career, Bhadauria has been awarded several medals: the Ati Vishisht Seva Medal (January 2013), the Vayu Sena Medal (January 2002). and the Param Vishisht Seva Medal (January 2018). He was appointed as the honorary air force ADC to the President of India on 1 January 2019. He was inducted into Mirpur Hall of Fame at Defence Services Command and Staff College, Bangladesh.

Param Vishisht Seva Medal		Ati Vishisht Seva Medal	
Vayu Sena Medal	Samanya Seva Medal	Siachen Glacier Medal	Operation Parakram Medal
Operation Vijay Medal	Sainya Seva Medal	High Altitude Service Medal	Videsh Seva Medal
50th Anniversary of Independence Medal	30 Years Long Service Medal	20 Years Long Service Medal	9 Years Long Service Medal

== Dates of rank ==
Insignia	Rank	Component	Date of rank
	Pilot Officer	Indian Air Force	15 June 1980
	Flying Officer	Indian Air Force	15 June 1981
	Flight Lieutenant	Indian Air Force	15 June 1985
	Squadron Leader	Indian Air Force	15 June 1991
	Wing Commander	Indian Air Force	5 May 1997
	Group Captain	Indian Air Force	1 May 2003
	Air Commodore	Indian Air Force	1 January 2008
	Air Vice Marshal	Indian Air Force	29 April 2011 (seniority from 1 January)
	Air Marshal	Indian Air Force	1 August 2014
	Air Chief Marshal (CAS)	Indian Air Force	30 September 2019

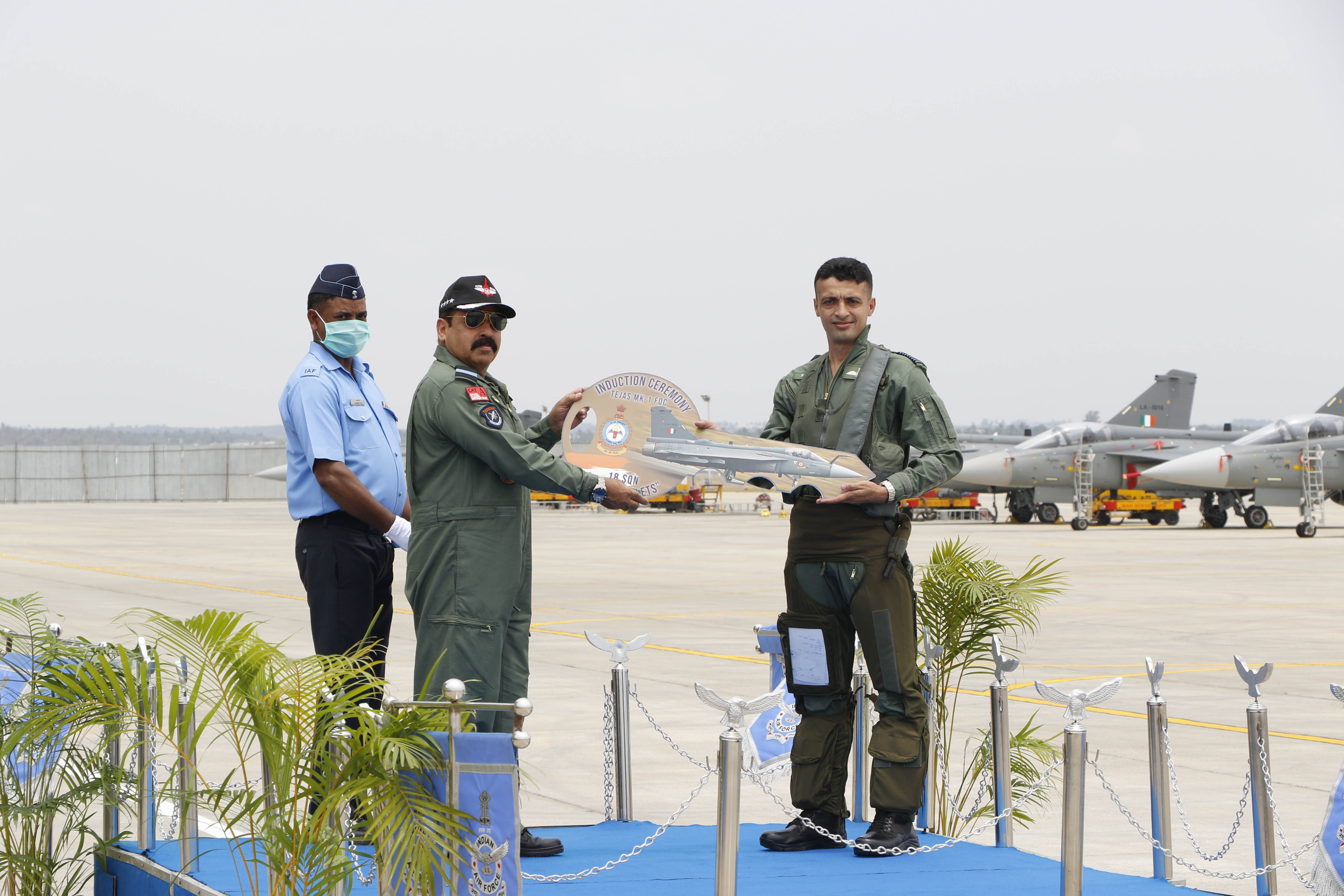
IAF Chief RKS Bhaduria handing over ceremonial key to SQ 18 CO Manish Tolani

Military offices
Preceded by Birender Singh Dhanoa	Chief of Air Staff; 30 September 2019 - 30 September 2021	Succeeded by Vivek Ram Chaudhari
Preceded by Anil Khosla	Vice Chief of Air Staff; 1 May 2019 - 30 September 2019	Succeeded by Harjit Singh Arora
Preceded by S R K Nair	Air Officer Commanding-in-Chief, Training Command; 1 August 2018 - 30 April 2019	Succeeded by Surendra Kumar Ghotia
Preceded by Sunderraman Neelakantan	Air Officer Commanding-in-Chief, Southern Air Command; 1 March 2017 - 31 July 2018	Succeeded by Balakrishnan Suresh
Preceded by Shyam Bihari Prasad Sinha	Deputy Chief of the Air Staff; 1 January 2016 - 28 February 2017	Succeeded by Raghunath Nambiar
Preceded by KS Gill	Commandant of the National Defence Academy; 1 August 2014 - 30 January 2015	Succeeded by G Ashok Kumar
