= Arvindra Singh Butola =

Indian Air Force officer

Air Marshal Arvindra Singh Butola PVSM, VM, VSM
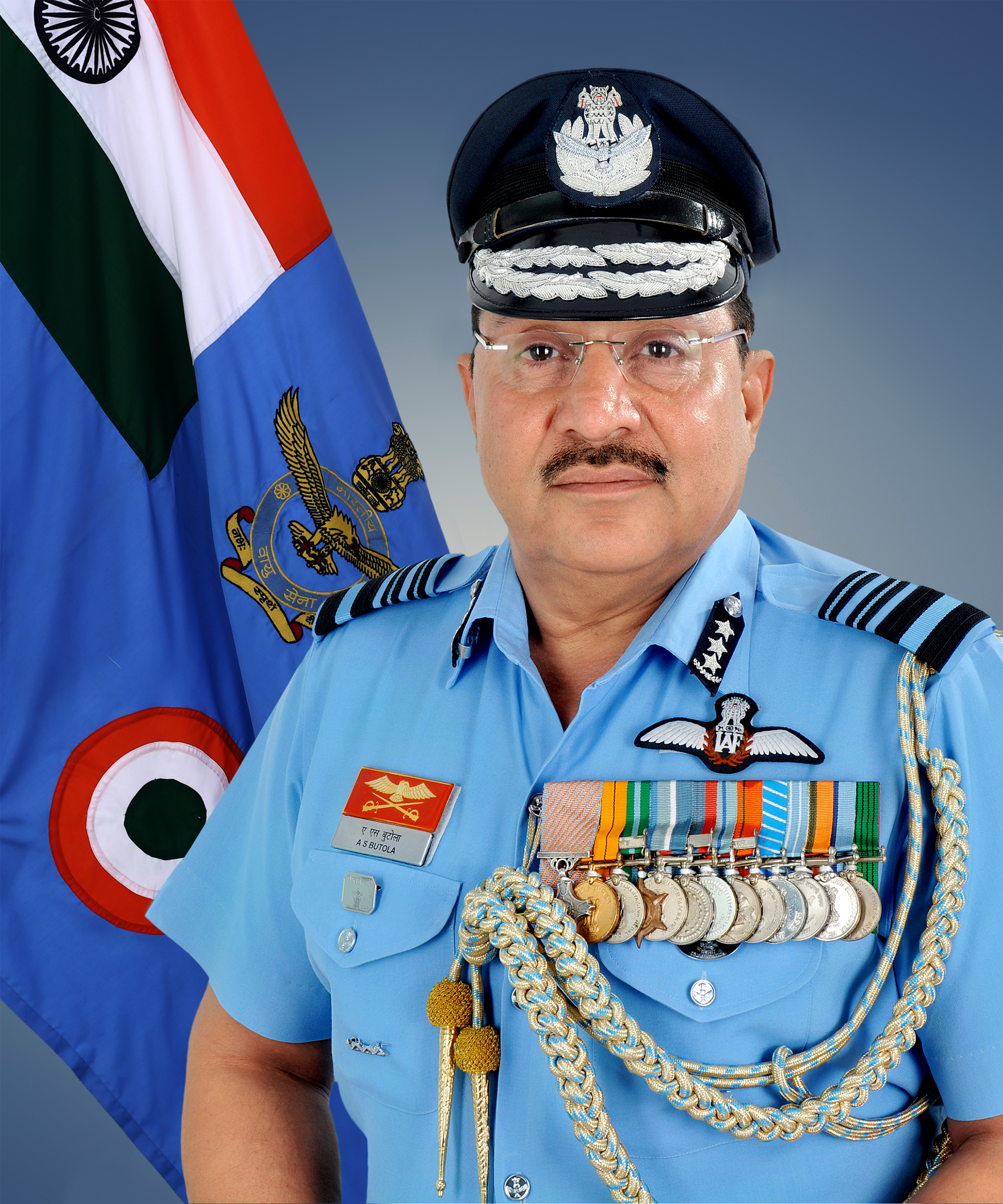
- Military career
- Allegiance: India
- Branch: Indian Air Force
- Service years: June 1982 - 30 September 2020
- Rank: Air Marshal
- Service number: 16789
- Commands: Training Command
- Awards: Param Vishisht Seva Medal; Vayusena Medal; Vishisht Seva Medal

Air Marshal Arvindra Singh Butola, PVSM, VM, VSM is a retired officer of the Indian Air Force. He was the Air Officer Commanding-in-Chief (AOC-in-C), Training Command, and assumed office on 14 October 2019 succeeding Air Marshal Surendra Kumar Ghotia. Air Marshal AS Butola superannuated on 30 September 2020.

== Early life and education ==
Butola graduated from National Defence Academy Khadakwasla in May 1981. He is an alumnus of the Defence Services Staff College, Wellington and the National Defence College, New Delhi.

== Career ==
Butola was commissioned as a helicopter pilot in the Indian Air Force in June 1982. He was a qualified flight instructor and had a flying experience of over 6700 hours on 21 different types of aircraft.

He has commanded a helicopter unit in Jammu and Kashmir, and had also been senior flying instructor and advisor to Namibian Defence Force. His other appointments included chief test pilot at Hindustan Aeronautics Limited, station commander of an air base under Western Air Command, senior officer-in-charge of administration of an operational command, as well as assistant chief of air staff operations (transport and helicopters) at air headquarters.

Butola assumed office of Commandant Air Force Academy on 4 September 2018 and served there till his appointment as AOC-in-C Training Command. Prior to Commandant of Air Force Academy, he served as Senior Air Staff Officer, Central Air Command, taking over on 1 August 2016.

== Honours and decorations ==
During his career of 37 years, Butola has been awarded the Vayusena Medal (VM) and Vishisht Seva Medal (VSM) and the Param Vishisht Seva Medal in 2021 for his service.

Param Vishisht Seva Medal	Vayu Sena Medal	Vishisht Seva Medal

Military offices
Preceded by Surendra Kumar Ghotia	Air Officer Commanding-in-Chief Training Command; 2019 - 2020	Succeeded by Rajiv Dayal Mathur
Preceded by Amit Tiwari	Commandant – Air Force Academy; 2018 - 2019	Succeeded by Jonnalagedda Chalapati
