= Anil Khosla =

Indian Air Force officer

Air Marshal Anil Khosla PVSM, AVSM, VM, ADC
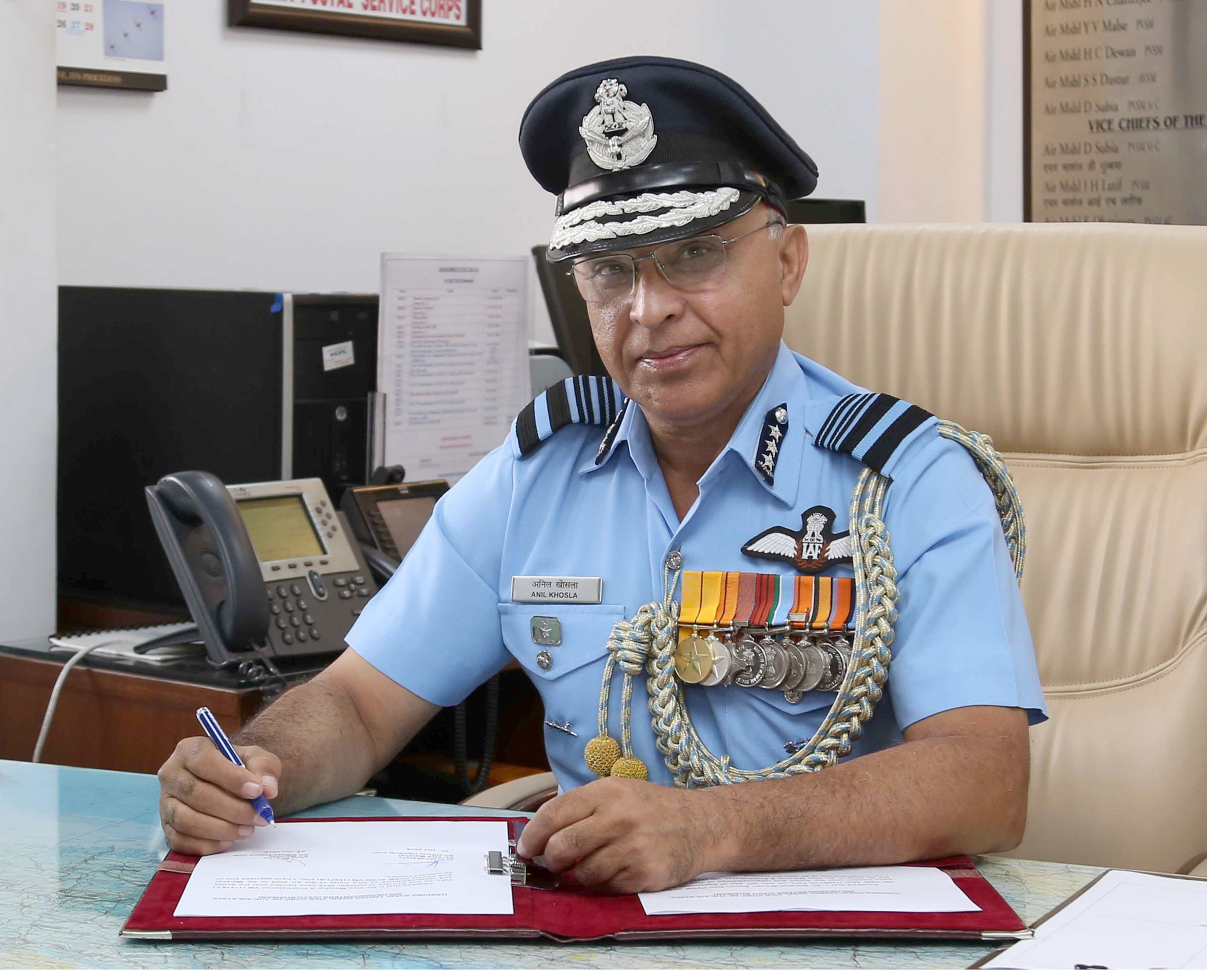
- Born: 9 April 1959 (age 67)
- Spouse: Deepshikha
- Military career
- Allegiance: India
- Branch: Indian Air Force
- Service years: December 1979 - April 2019
- Rank: Air Marshal
- Commands: Vice Chief of the Air Staff; Eastern Air Command; Director General Air Operations; Director General of Inspection and Safety
- Awards: Param Vishisht Seva Medal; Ati Vishisht Seva Medal; Vayu Sena Medal

Air Marshal Anil Khosla, PVSM, AVSM, VM, ADC is a retired Indian air force officer who served as 42nd Vice Chief of the Air Staff (VCAS) of the Indian Air Force. He assumed the office on 1 October 2018 and handed over on 30 April 2019.

== Career ==
Khosla was commissioned into the fighter stream of the Indian Air Force in December 1979. He has clocked over 4000 hours of flying on different aircraft like SEPECAT Jaguar, MiG-21 and HAL Kiran. He has experience in both ground attack and air defence roles and specializes in maritime role. He is also an A2 category flying instructor and a fighter strike leader.

He has commanded a SEPECAT Jaguar squadron assigned to a maritime role and two IAF frontline bases, Jaisalmer AFS and Ambala AFS. He has held other key posts as well including, Principal Director at Directorate of Information and Electronic Warfare; Director in Personnel branch; Joint Director at Directorate of Concept Studies; Air Officer Commanding HQ Maritime Air Operations; Air Officer Commanding J&K Area; Senior Air Staff Officer (SASO), Central Air Command; Director General Air Operations, Air HQ and Director General (Inspection & Safety), Air HQ and Air Officer Commanding-in-Chief (AOC-in-C), Eastern Air Command (1 January 2017 - 30 September 2018).

• Handled DOKLAM and BALAKOT operations.

• Served in all the operational commands of the IAF, In all the sectors. Commanded two important operational Bases (Ambala and Jaisalmer)

• Worked extensively with the Army and Navy. Associated with several Government Ministries and agencies including NTRO, DRDO, ISRO, NDMA and defence PSUs.

• Involved with the formulation of Air Force War Plans, Force structure planning and capability building.

• Handled (planned, monitored and executed) several internal and international Exercises and Disaster Relief situations, both within the country and abroad.

== Awards and medals ==
Khosla has been awarded several medals. He stood first in the order of merit of all the attended courses namely: Flying Instructors course, Fighter Strike leaders course, Junior command course and Staff course. He was also awarded Commandants medal for higher command course at Army war college. He is recipient of AOC-in-C commendation (as flying cadet for force landing HT -2 ac during solo) and CAS commendation. Presidential awards include the Ati Vishisht Seva Medal, the Vayu Sena Medal and the Param Vishisht Seva Medal (2018).

=== Military awards ===

	Param Vishisht Seva Medal	Ati Vishisht Seva Medal	
Vayusena Medal	General Service Medal - Naga Hills Service	Operation Parakram Medal	Sainya Seva Medal
50th Anniversary of Independence Medal	30 Years Long Service Medal	20 Years Long Service Medal	9 Years Long Service Medal

== Education and academic work ==
Khosla is an alumnus of National Defence Academy, Pune and National Defence College, New Delhi. He is a post-graduate from Defense Service Staff College, Wellington. He also attended a higher command course at the Army War College, Mhow and was awarded the Commandants medal. In addition, he attended a senior defence management course at College of Defence Management, Secunderabad.

Holds Two M Phil degrees in defence and strategic studies. Pursuing research on China (How does Dragon's brain work).

Delivered talks on military subjects like Leadership, China, and Pakistan, Air Power, Maritime air operations and IAF, in military academic institutions including the National Defence College (NDC), College of Air Warfare (CAW), Army War College (AWC), College of Naval Warfare (CNW), College of Defence Management (CDM) and Defence Services Staff College (DSSC).

Distinguished fellow at United Services Institute (USI) and Centre of Air Power Studies (CAPS). On the editorial board of the College of Air Warfare Journal and CAPS Journal (Blue Yonder). Strategic Advisor – Aerospace and Defence division of the Synergia Foundation, Advisor Indus International Research Foundation. Instructor at Peninsula Foundation and worked with several think tanks and academic organisations.

Academic work also includes written papers (On air power, geopolitics and security issues), Conduct of Strategic Exercises, book reviews, mentoring and motivational talks.

POST RETIREMENT CONTRIBUTION

Work Done with Organisations

Distinguished fellow at United Services Institute (USI).

Distinguished Fellow at the Center of Air Power Studies (CAPS).

On the editorial board of the College of Air Warfare Journal.

On the editorial board of CAPS Journal (Blue Yonder).

On the editorial board of News Analytics Journal.

Strategic Advisor – Aerospace and Defence division of the Synergia Foundation.

Advisor – Indus International Research Foundation.

Mentor: Chakra Dialogues.

Chief Editorial Advisor – IIRF Yearbook

Affiliated with CENJOWS as a Subject Matter Expert.

Advisor - Bharat TV Now

Forum for Global Studies – on the panel of experts.

Distinguished visiting fellow at CNSS (Center for National Security Studies) at MS Ramaiah University of Applied Sciences (RUAS).

Life member: White Canvas Education Council.

Conferred a title by Gems B School: Distinguished Son of India.

Organisation	Type of Organisation	Type of work
Centre of Air Power Studies (CAPS) Distinguished Fellow On the editorial board of CAPS Journal (Blue Yonder).	Think Tank	Talks (China, Leadership, Joint Strategic support force & Maritime air ops). Articles for the journals (6+). Seminar on Ukraine war. Discussions during the WASP program.
United Services Institute (USI) Distinguished Fellow	Think Tank	Talks, panellists in Seminars/Webinars, Articles for journals, Strategic exercises at IFS, NDC, CAW and 27 Mtn Div, mentoring, strategic game on capability building. Peer review of paper. Strategic exercise at AWC.
Synergia Foundation Strategic Advisor – Aerospace and Defence division of the Synergia Foundation.	Think Tank	Articles, Talk during Aero India, Talk during Def Expo. Talk at Bangalore International Centre.
Shyama Prakash Mukherji Research Foundation (SPMRF)	Think Tank	Suraksha Samvad - Study & Discussion
Delhi Policy Group (DPG)	Think Tank	Panellist in Seminars / Webinars
Vivekanand International Foundation	Think Tank	Panellist in Webinars and Podcasts. Wargame.
CENJOWS Affiliated as Subject Matter Expert	Think Tank	Panellist in Seminars / Webinars (Integrated Capability Development – Sep 21)
CSDR (The Council for Strategic and Defence Research)	Think Tank	Talk / Lecture on Air Power & IAF
CKS – Center for Knowledge Sovereignty	Think Tank	Talk on China – How Does Dragon's Brain Work Talk – Strategic evolution of IAF
Manohar Parikar Institute of Defence Studies and Analysis(MPIDSA)	Think Tank	Participated in Seminars/ webinars
Fair Observer (USA)	Think Tank	Panellist in Seminar/ webinar Making sense of India's stand on Ukraine
CASA (The Current & Strategic Affairs Forum)	Think Tank	Participated in Seminars/ webinars
National Maritime Foundation	Think Tank	Participated in Seminars/ webinars Indo-pacific strategic dialogue
CLAWS	Think Tank	Participated in Seminars/ webinars Articles for the journal. Panellist in AAD seminar on Unmanned Aerial Systems. Seminar on Op Sindoor
SAMDES	Think Tank	Participated in Seminars/ webinars
The Takshashila Institution	Think Tank	Participated in Seminars/ webinars Panellist for discussion on Agniveer scheme
The Peninsula Foundation	Think Tank	Lecture on Air power and IAF Participated in Seminars/ webinars
Chennai Center for China Studies	Think Tank	Panellist in Seminar/ webinar (PLAAF)
Indic Research Forum	Think Tank	Panellist in Seminar/ webinar (PLAAF) Keynote address: IAF and Counterterrorism ops Panelist: Ukraine war.
Chanakya Forum Website	Think Tank	Articles for the website / Journal (17+)
Chanakya Diaries	Journal	Articles: Genesis of airpower theories and their relevance today in the inaugural issue. Indian Quandary About Fifth-Generation Fighter Aircraft
Gyan Chakra (WC of IA)	Think Tank	Article on IAF Strategies past, present and future.
Strive Dialogue (CC of IA)	Think Tank	Discussion on IAF multi-national exercises
Observers Research Foundation (ORF)	Think Tank	Global wars and lessons for Indian airpower
Indus International Research Foundation (IIRF) Advisor – Indus International Research Foundation. & Chief Editorial Advisor	Think Tank	Panellist – Theatre command in the Indian context and Seminar on Indo-US Collaboration Article for the yearbook (3) Articles for the website (20+) Seminar on Op sindoor
Asia Centre Bangalore	Think Tank	Member – talk on China
Forum for Global Studies (on Panel of Experts)	Think Tank	Capsule on AI in Military
DSCI - Data Security Council of India	Security Organisation	Panellist and chair in the seminar on Aerospace security
National Defence College (NDC)	Military Institute	Talks on China, Pakistan, and Afghanistan Panellist – Future Application of Force – joint way ahead.
College of Air Warfare (CAW) Editorial Board of CAW Journal	Military Institute	Talks (China, IAF, Airpower, leadership etc.), Paper reviews (China, grey zone and Airpower, Hypersonic weapons, China military-civil fusion, etc.) and strategic exercise
Flying Training Institute - Air Force Academy	Military Institute	Talks on leadership and motivation, Technology and air power
Flying Training Institute - Bidar	Military Institute	Changing nature of warfare
Flying Training Institute - Hakimpet	Military Institute	Dealing with two inimical neighbours.
College of Defence Management	Military Institute	Talks on China, IAF, airpower, leadership etc.)
Army War College	Military Institute	Talks on (China, Airpower, IAF etc.) Strategic Game Exercise
College of Naval Warfare (CNW)	Military Institute	Talks on (Maritime air operations, Airpower and IAF)
Defence Services Staff College (DSSC)	Military Institute	Talks on (Airpower, China, IAF, maritime air Operations, etc.) Non-Kinetic Warfare – Seminar and mentoring during exercise
Western Air Command, IAF	IAF	Talk on China and Doklam
Eastern Air Command, IAF	IAF	Webinar on China with CAPS – Joint Strategic Support Force, Article for Coffee Table Book
Southern Air Command	IAF	China in IOR, Maritime air ops
Training Command, IAF	IAF	Seminar on the 1971 War. Talk on Multilateralism.
HQ Maritime air ops	IAF	Future maritime air operations
Air Force Association	IAF	Article for Journal on HT-2 Aircraft and Women Air Warriors, Article on women air warriors
Talks at IAF Units, SDI, ASTE, BRDs (Pune & Delhi), Six squadron	IAF	Practical Leadership and Management, Ukraine conflict, IAF, Air power subjects
Air Force Station Adampur	IAF	Talk on China
HQ IDS	HQ IDS	Panellist – ICADS, AP vis-à-vis NKW
ARTRAC, IA	Army	Panellist – Air power and MDW
HQ Southern Command	Army	Panellist in a seminar on Unmanned aerial systems
Union Public Service Commission (UPSC)	Government	Advisor.
Def Talks	Video channel	Video Interviews(Drone threat, IAF roles and tasks, AP in GZ, Tejas and Indigenisation, IAF Fighter ac strength, Theatre commands, collective security, S – 400, Ukraine War, air superiority, Space warfare, Life of a Fighter Pilot
Lt Gen Gurmeet Singh	Video channel	Video Interview (China, IAF and leadership)
Hum Hindustani	Video channel	Video Interview (China, Drone Threat)
Let's Talk It	US-based Channel	Online talk on Good working culture. Talk on Growth Mindset.
Jaideep Saikia	Journalist	Panellist in Webinar on China
The Book Review & Literary Trust	Literary Trust	5 Book Reviews
FPRC (Foreign Policy Research Centre)	Research Institute	Articles India's relations with Russia, USA and China
ABP	News Channel	Commentaries (Republic Day and Air Force Day)
BBC (Jugal Purohit)	News Channel	Interview on Balakot
CNN	News Channel	Video bytes – UFO sighting at Imphal airport
India TV	News Channel	Interview on Balakot, IAF Capability building
NDTV (Vishnu Som)	News Channel	Interview (Rafale)
Sansad TV	News Channel	Interview
India Today	News Channel	Interview on Balakot Interview on China Threat & Indian Military Preparedness. RD Commentary Panel discussions
TV9 Bharatvarsh	News Channel	Video bytes on the TEJAS program, the Israel-Hamas war, the Astra Missile, a New airfield in Pakistan, Nyoma airfield, and the Launch of 50 satellites. Video bytes on SU-30 aircraft.
DD News	News Channel	Aero India 2023 Interview on Tejas aircraft Drone Shakti 2023
Eurasian Times	News Channel Website	Articles (25) Inputs on Articles
Sputnik News Russia	News Channel	Interview on Defence contracts, inputs on Air Defence, S-400, BMD, Oreshnik Missile, and Analakshya.
Bharat TV Now Advisor - Bharat TV Now	News Channel	Advisor Discussion on the Israel-Hamas War Independence day message
Millennium Post	E-newspaper	Article on IAF.
News Analytics On the editorial board of News Analytics Journal	Online Forum	Articles (10)
Life of Soldier	Website and e-Magazine	Articles (15)
News-Times	YouTube News channel	Podcast with Dinesh K Vohra on IAF Challenges and Preparedness. Podcast on Drone threat
Dept of East Asian Studies, DU	University	Panel Discussion: Modernisation of the Chinese Military
Rashtriya Raksha University	University	Talk: PLAAF and its modernisation.
UPES – University of Petroleum and Energy Studies (Dehradun)	University	Talk on Practical leadership and management during FDP – Faculty Development Program
JNU	University	Talk on China
Fletcher South Asia society	University	India's defence preparedness in a new environment.
Vels University, Chennai	University	Chief guest, talk on airpower, technology and motivation, Podcast
Hindustan University, Chennai	University	Keynote address - “International Conference on Autonomous Airborne Systems(ICAAS-2023)”
Christ University, Bangalore	University	Motivational Talk
Reva University, Bangalore	University	Track two Dialogue, Panellist – Indo – Russia Relations National Conference on Cold War 2.0
IIT Hyderabad	University	Panellist – Technology in Defence Services.
Alliance University, Bangalore	University	Technology in the Defence Sector
Karnavati University Gandhinagar	University	Talk on warfare and leadership
Dayanand Sagar University, Bangalore	University	Global Citizenship seminar
Center for National Security Studies at MS University of Applied Sciences	University	Distinguished Visiting Fellow. Round table conference on Agniveer.
MOP Vaishnav College Chennai	College	Military Diplomacy
VJTI (Mumbai)	College	Motivational talk during the tech festival
Stanley College (Hyderabad)	College	Motivational talk during college festival
BITS Pilani (Goa)	College	Motivational talk during college festival
IIT (Delhi)	College	Study on bullet-resistant Material
IIM Trichy	IIM	Leadership and strategic management
Punjab Engineering College Chandigarh	College	Life in IAF, leadership and motivation
GEMS B School Conferred a title by Gems B School: Distinguished Son of India.	College	Convocation motivational Address
ICFAI – Indian Chartered Financial Analysts Institute	Institute	India, Pakistan and China
Empowerment Talks	Motivational group	Motivational Talk
White Canvas India Life member: White Canvas Education Council.	Education company	Chief Guest at India's top 20 under 20. (2021 and 2022) Chief Guest for Book launch – Yes, we did Chief Guest for Young CEO workshop at Gurukul, Ryan International and Scindia School.
BCG – Boston Consulting Company	Consultation Firm	Consultation on C4ISR
The Brand Called You	Media Tech global platform	Interview
Cognet Integrated Business Solutions	Corporate	Talk on Good working Environment.
YPO – Young President's Organisation	Corporate	Interaction – India, Pakistan, China.
Embryonic Foundation	NGO	Defence dialogue interview and interaction
MH Cockpits	Aviation courses	Chief guest, talk on airpower, technology and motivation, Podcast
Blue sky podcasts	Podcasts	Journey through IAF
Pankaj Sharma	Podcast	Independence day special
Between US (Santosh Kumar)	Podcast	Leadership, geopolitics, airpower and security Independence day special
Locomotive welfare association	Welfare Association	Chief guest and motivational talk.
Youth Parliament / Chatra Sansad	Youth Organisation	Motivational talk on discipline and tolerance.
Byjus	Education Company	Live Project on how does an aeroplane fly.
Bangalore International Centre	Social Organisation	Talk on “The Future of Conflict in an Asian Context”
SpkWthGrv	Talk Show	Life in IAF and IAF broader issues
BIAG India (International Aviation Games Board)	Board	Talk on Drones
Gurukul Ryan International The Scindia School, Gwalior	Schools	Chief guest during young CEO workshop - Motivational talk
New Horizon, Bangalore TAFS, Delhi	School	Motivational Talk
Destination India	National Journal	Article: “Airpower in Indian Context” in the special issue – Defence matters.
Peace Prints	South Asian Journal	Women in Armed Forces: Prospects and Challenges.
SP Aviation	Journal	Articles (5)
Chandigarh Military Literary Festival	Lit Fest	Panel Discussant on IMEEEC
Defence PRO/Press Information Bureau of India/ Press Trust of India	Def PRO/PIB/PTI	Podcast on Ex Tarang Shakti. Article: Previewing Aero India 2025. Honouring the Veterans: India remembers its Braves Interviews on contemporary issues
Chatra Sansad	Youth Parliament	Motivational talks (3), Ahmedabad and Baroda
Model UN	Youth Program	Lucknow and Bangalore

Topics Covered

Leadership, Management, Motivation, and Growth Mindset

Decision making
Mental toughness
Earning respect
Good leadership qualities and values
Science of Karma
Good working culture and environment
Listening Skills
Be good, feel good
Healthy working environment
importance of Tolerance
Lessons from Buddha
Difference between strength and courage
Lessons from rich and famous
Leadership lessons from Hollywood movies.
Shark in the tank theory of management
Car wheel theory of management
Aya Ram Gaya Ram syndrome – yes, men.
Calculated Risks
Practical Leadership and Management
Communication skills and body language
Lessons from Nanak
Being Responsible and Tolerant
Growth Mindset
Transferable Skills
Advice to the young generation
Motivational Talks
Importance of self-discipline
Learn from Ganesha
Listen to Krishna
Words of Wisdom
Life in IAF
Convocation Address – lessons from life in IAF
Courage is an essential trait of leadership.
Leadership: A Privilege
Embrace your Journey of Life
Trust and Integrity: The Cornerstones of Authentic Leadership
Growth Mindset: Individuals, Leaders and Organisations.
Five by Five rule: Assured happiness.
Ancient Stoic Wisdom for a Modern World
Leadership/Strategic Management: Lessons from the military
Battlefield to Boardroom: Applying Military Challenges to Corporate Challenges

China

China's Brain is differently wired.
China's strategic thought
China's military modernisation
China's Defence industry
China - Pakistan Collusion
China – Art of deception
China: Kill Pigs List
China: Social Score System
China: Active Defence Policy
China's Joint Strategic Support Force (JSSF)
China – Joint Strategic Support Force.
Dealing with the Dragon
China's grey zone operations
China: Flavours of military Reform
China: Pillars of Military Reform
China's new diplomacy – drawing red lines in the sand.
China – demographic analysis.
China through US Prism
China in the South China Sea
China's Military - Civil Fusion
PLAAF Analysis Strengths and weaknesses
Book review on China Airpower
Dealing with Dragon
Knowing China Better: lie flat and let it rot.
Knowing China, Better social life and customs
Something is not right in Dragon Land.
Q&A India China stand-off
China in IOR
What is cooking in the Chinese military cauldron
Dragon at Shigatse
China aircraft carrier development
China's military reorganisation: a story of evolution and reversion.
China's challenges in developing next-generation fighter engines.
China's LYNX Robot: A broader shift towards unmanned warfare.
China Unveils White Emperor: Sixth Generation Fighter Aircraft
Chinese J10C for Bangladesh: A Strategic Step or Misstep
Decoding China's sixth-generation fighter aircraft
CPC's Weapon of Influence: United Front Work Department
Dragon Tightens Its Grip: China's Military Presence Grows In Larung Gar
China Through US Prism 2024
China Flies Its Sixth-Generation Fighter Aircraft: A Leap Into The Future Of Air Combat
The Digital Silk Road Implication of China's Techno-Political Strategy
Chinese Fighter Aircraft For Bangladesh: Comparative Analysis.
China's Water Wars and Dams
An Ageing Giant: The Demographic Challenge Facing China
Kashmir Through a Chinese Lens
Chinese Airfields in Tibet
Xi Jinping's Magical Purges: Making People Disappear

Pakistan

Pakistan through US Prism
Lesser known facts: 1971 war
Pakistan's National Security Policy
1965 Indo-Pak war (leadership, morale, training & tactics matter)
1965 a western sunrise: India's war with Pakistan
Balakot Strike
The new airfield in Pakistan
Chinese gyrfalcon in Pakistan skies
Pakistan - the Balochistan conundrum
From ally to adversary: US sanctions highlight Pakistan's missile threat.
Paktika on Fire: Pakistani Air Strike in Afghanistan
Pakistan Train Hijack: Start of a Larger Crisis
Op Sindoor – India's Water Canon against Pakistan Sponsored Terrorism: Indus Water Treaty
Op Sindoor -Desperate Men do Desperate Things: Pakistan Army Chief Playing with Fire
Op Sindoor – Diplomatic Earthquake: Shimla Agreement Teeters on the Edge
Op Sindoor - Pakistan's Backwards March: Led by Generals, Paid by the People

Bangladesh

Saint Martin's island: A strategic Gem in the Bay of Bengal
Bangladesh: Shifting alliances, Strategic Projects and India's concerns
Bangladesh's Anti-India Stance and Rhetoric
Bangladesh Playing with Fire
India's Water Canon against Pakistan-Sponsored Terrorism
From Estrangment to Engagement: Pakistan and Bangladesh Recalibrating Ties

Geopolitics

China
Pakistan – National Security Policy, Turmoil
Afghanistan
India's foreign policy
India's neighbourhood
Quad
Indo - Russian relations
State of Airpower Assets in Afghanistan
Indo - US relations
Afghanistan: Taliban run over
World in Transition
US-China Shadowboxing over Taiwan
China spoiling Bhutan's GNH.
Thucydides Trap, – Dragon challenging Eagle
South China sea
Gini Index and implications.
Multilateralism: Flexible Security Cooperation.
India-Pakistan border issue - tunnels and drones
India-China border talks
China Pak Collusivity
SCO Shanghai Cooperation Organisation: Relevance and future trajectory
Sri Lanka Economic crisis: lessons and opportunity
Ukraine Conflict
Bangladeshi tango with China
Economic Sanctions
Djibouti: Tug of war between USA and China
The Future of Conflict in the Asian Context
Israel Palestine standoff
India, Pakistan, China Asian triangle
Indo-US Collaboration in Defence
World in Transit
Indo-Russia relations
Indo-Vietnam Cooperation
Many suitors for strategically located Djibouti
Renewed Impetus to Indo-Russia Relations
Peace and Security in South Asia: Bangladesh and Myanmar
Cold War Redux: Traits and Drivers of Cold War 2.0
Reverse Globalisation: Contemporary Strategic Economic Policies.
Canada-India Tension: Spotlight on the Five Eyes Alliance
India Middle East Europe Economic Corridor
Five Eye Alliance
China+1 Policy: Dragon's Loss is Others' Gain.
Syrian Crisis: Geopolitical uncertainties
Operation Bashan Arrow: Israel's Strategic Necessity or Opportunism.
Imperial Overtstress: Rise and Fall of Empires.
Cold War Redux: Military aspects of cold war 2.0 and Impact on Indian Security
South Korean Crisis: Ripple Effect on India
Chinese J-10c For Bangladesh: Next Big Step Or Strategic Misstep
From Ally To Adversary: US Sanctions Highlight Pakistan Missile Threat
Operation Paperclip: A Moral Paradox
Greenland's rising importance: A strategic asset in global security.
Indo-Taiwan Cooperation: AI and Semi-Conductors
Indo-US Defence and Security Cooperation: Interest-Based to Long-Term Strategic Partnership
The Petro-Renminbi Challenge to the Petro-Dollar
Global Citizenship in the 21st Century
Global Citizenship in Education and Peace-Building
Global Citizenship in Conflict Resolution and Peace Building
Trump-Zelensky Meeting: A Case Study in Diplomatic Disaster.
Indo-US Defence Cooperation: F-35 Offer
NATO's Relevance In Today's World Order
Changing Character Of Conflicts: Challenges To Peace Operations And International Humanitarian Law
Trump's aggressive Stance on Houthis: Deepening of Conflict.
Fear of Honey Traps: US Bans Diplomats from getting in relationship with Chinese Nationals.
Kashmir Through Chinese Lens

Air Power

Airpower in Grey Zone Operations
Airpower in no war, no peace situation
Air Power & Non-Kinetic Warfare
Air Power in Multi-Domain Warfare
Airpower in HADR ops and aid to civil authorities
Drone Threat: The Big Picture
Fighter aircraft classifications by generations
Emerging Technologies and Air Defence
Air Power in Modern-Day Warfare
S-400 SAM AD System
Combat Aviation most desired – least understood.
Changing nature of warfare
Air Defence operations
Air power strategies: multiple threats and limited resources
Airpower in the maritime domain
Air Power and effect-based operations
Air power concepts: Command / control the air, air supremacy, Air superiority and favourable air situation.
Contemporary airpower thought
How does an aeroplane fly
Air power basics revisited.
Air power and war endurance
Global Wars and lessons for Indian airpower
Classification of fighter jets into generations
Centralised planning, decentralised execution
Global Airpower Ranking 2024
Giulio Douhet: Relevance Today
All About Airpower
Airpower in the Indian Context
Airpower Theorists and Their Core Thoughts and Beliefs
Likely 6th Gen features on SU 57 aircraft and its Exportability Challenges
Relevance of John Warden's thoughts on Air Power Application and Air Campaign Planning.
Future trends of fighter aircraft.
Air Campaign Planning
Genesis of airpower theories and their relevance today
Adapting Airpower Lessons from Israel
Loyal Wingman Concept: Advantages & Enablers
Loyal Wingman Concept: International Programs
Loyal Wingman Concept: Challenges and Prospects
Relevance of Bombers in Contemporary Warfare
Decoding China's sixth-generation fighter aircraft
Rise of combat drones: Implications for traditional air power.
Combat Drones: Global Overview
F-35 Stealth Vs. Beast Mode
Role of America's F-47 Sixth-Generation Fighter Jet in a Shifting Defence Landscape
Rafale M for the Indian Navy

Technology and Warfare

Hypersonics and hypersonic weapons
Technology and airpower
Future Trajectory of AI
Artificial intelligence
Future of conflict in new domains (Space, Cyber and deep sea)
Unmanned Platforms and Swarms, Loyal Wingman Concept
AI and Fake News
AI: Digital twins and Surrogate models
Military application of quantum technology.
What next after 6th gen aircraft
Technology in the defence forces.
Mission Divyastra MIRV Technology
Technology and the future of aircraft maintenance
Speed Race: Hypersonic weapons
Countering Hypersonic Threat: Difficult but Manageable Problem
Analkshya Cloaking Technology
MUM-T vis-à-vis Loyal Wingman concept
Military AI Applications Enhancing Decision-Making
Durga and Kaali: India's DEW Program
Difference between Loitering munitions and Kamikaze drones
Blockchain Technology: A Comprehensive Overview
Counter-Stealth Technologies and Their Effectiveness.
AI: Shifting of Balance of Power
Ukraine Unveils Tryzub: A Game-Changing DEW
Stealth Vs. Counter-Stealth: The Evolving Battle In Sixth-Generation Air Warfare
5g Race Between the Dragon And The Eagle: Potential to Enhance Aerial Warfare
India's First Fpv Drone With Kamikaze Anti-Tank Munition.
Leonidas By Epirus: Star Trek Style Shield Of Directed Energy Weapon
Artificial Intelligence In Modern Warfare: Opportunities And Challenges
Counter-Stealth Technologies And Their Effectiveness
India Enters LASER Age: MK-II(A) Ushers in a new era of Defence Technology.

Security

Collective Security
National Security / Military Strategy
Urgent need for National Security Policy
Collective dealing with non-traditional challenges
Aerospace security challenges.
Synergising India's military and diplomatic goals
Cold war 2.0: Military aspects and India
Fear Of Honey Traps: U.S. Bans Its Diplomats From Getting In Any ‘Relationships’ With Chinese Nationals

Cyber Safety and Security

Cyber warfare
Digital addiction
Economic Cyber Frauds
Future of conflict in new domains (Space, Cyber and deep sea)
Cyber Posturing and Cyber Strategic Coercion.

Nuclear

Nuclear trends, threats and challenges 27 Jun 24
Nuclear aspects revisited

Space

Space operations
Space warfare and organisation in India
Space-based ISR
Space warfare in the Korean Peninsula
Launch of 50 surveillance satellites by ISRO in 5 years.
Future of conflict in new domains (Space, Cyber and deep sea)
Anatariksha Abhyas 2024: A New Era for India's Space Security.
Formation Flying in Space
Space power: Shaping the future conflicts
Colonising Space: Opportunities and Challenges
Indian Space Program's Giant Leap: Shubhanshu Shukla Heads To Space Station
NISAR: Mapping the Future and Revolutionising Climate and Disaster Intelligence
India's Persistent Eyes in the Sky: Stratospheric Airship Platforms

Indian Air Force

Capability development
Tejas and AMCA project
IAF's role in HADR and aid to civil and other agencies
Network-centric operations
PLAAF and IAF comparative analysis
IAF Modernisation
Balakot Operations
Maritime air operations in future
Rafale induction and capability enhancement
S-400 Induction
Fire Power Demo: Ex Vayu Shakti
IAF fighter strength drawdown and mitigation plan
IAF Strategies: past, present and future.
Life in the IAF
IAF multi-national exercises
Exercise Bright Star 2023
C-295 ac induction, IAF capability enhancement and benefits
Strategic evolution of IAF
Astra AAR BVR Missile
Journey through IAF
Prachand the Himalayan griffin.
Women air warriors in the IAF
IAF challenges and future trajectory.
Discussion on the book by Jasjit Sinh: Defence from the Skies.
Race and hunt for medium transport aircraft
Multinational Exercise Tarang Shakti hosted by the IAF
All you want to know about ASTE and SDI of IAF
IAF Flight Path@92
IAF Guardians of the sky.
Russia's White Swan Bomber: Game-changer or White Elephant for IAF?
Russia's Su-57 Offer To India: Balancing Needs And Strategic Interests
Jaguar aircraft in the IAF and the relevance of the Bombers
India and Russia will likely deal with the Voronezh Radar System.
Transforming Indian Skies: The MRFA acquisition for a future-ready IAF
Fifth Generation Fighter Aircraft War Over Indian Skies.
Indian Quandary About Fifth-Generation Fighter Aircraft
IAF and Contemporary Air Power Application
F-35 Dilemma Revisited: Balancing, Affordability, Capability and Trade-Offs.
Exercise Iniochos-25: IAF On Board Charioteer
IAF Operation Brahma: HADR to Myanmar
IAF aircraft encounter GPS spoofing over Myanmar.
Precision from Afar: India's Glide Bomb and the Changing Nature of Warfare
GPS Interference of IAF Aircraft over Myanmar

War and Warfare

Types of war
Decoys and Deception
Afghanistan Air Assets
Future Wars
Warfare
Grey Zone Warfare
Classification of warfare into generations (Russian Thoughts)
Domains of warfare
C4ISR
Military Balance in the Region
Ukraine War: Air Power aspects, a case of dog and bone, Air Superiority aspects, decoding the Ukraine war. Lessons.
Operational Logistics
Lesser-known facts about 1971the War
Review of the book on the 1962 war
Review of the book on the 1965 war
India's two-front challenge
Douhet theories
Duration of Conflict
Jasjit Singh on Airpower
Galwan standoff
Asymmetric Threat
Accelerating the Paradigm Shift
Multilateralism: Relevance and changes
Aspect - Long-drawn wars
National Security Strategy
HAMAS attack on Israel
Cognitive warfare
India's readiness for drone warfare
Integrated deterrence
Orchestrating Air Campaigns: Thumb Rules
Russia-Ukraine War: Phase of Engagement with Long-Range Vectors
Kargil War
Hellscape strategy: countering mass with smarter mass.
Kusk incursion: Turning the Tables (Operation Krepost)
Israeli air force intelligence-driven precision strikes on the heart of Lebanon.
Info Warfare: Press Freedom Vis-à-vis Responsibility
Learning from the Israel Defence Forces.
Intelligence drives the precision strikes of Israel.
Russian use of ORESHNIK Missile and its strategic implications.
The Boomerang Effect: When Militant Groups Turn On Their Sponsors
Winds of Change in Global Defence
Contemporary wars through the lens of Galtung's theory
Guerrilla air defence: strategy of the underdog.
Artificial Intelligence in Modern Warfare: Opportunities and Challenges
Epochs of Warfare from Ancient to Contemporary Wars.
Psychological Warfare in Ukraine: Success Or Failure
Understanding UAS Threats & Vulnerabilities
Psychological Warfare in Ukraine: Success or Failure
Integrated Air Defence Systems
Artificial Intelligence-Enabled Air Force: The Future of Aerial Warfare
Human Factors in Technologically Advanced Warfare
Challenges to Peacekeeping Operations and International Humanitarian Laws.
25+ seminars/TV Interviews on Op Sindoor

Military

Military diplomacy
Military spending: trends and analysis.
Collusive Threat and Deterrence: Air and Space Aspects
Integrated Capability Development.
Joint war game training systems
Fighter Pilot: Traits
Agni veer and Agnipath / Tour of duty / making the best of the scheme
Andaman and Nicobar Command and Islands
Defining Military Diplomacy
Women in the Indian Defence Services
Joint Operations and Jointmanship
Trends in International Arms Transfer
Global Military Spending – Trends and Analysis (2023)
Women in defence forces: prospects and challenges.
Intricacies of multinational military exercises.
Apache helicopter delivery delay: The broader issue of trust quotient.
Learning From Israeli Defence Forces
Projecting power from aircraft carriers: enhancing maritime capability
Wings of the Army: Role of Air Arm in Ground Operations.
Honouring the Veterans: India Remembers Its Braves
Wings of the Army: The role of the air arm in ground operations
India's tryst with Combat drones
Exercise Prachand Prahaar: India's Integrated Multi-Domain High-Altitude Tri-Service War Drill
Balancing Cost And Combat Capability In Fighter Jet Procurement

Higher Defence Organisation

Department of military affairs
Theaterisation
Air Defence Command
Civil-military fusion
Theatre Command in the Indian Context
Reorganisation of HDO in India

Flight Safety

Golden rules of safety
Importance of SOPs
A proactive approach to safety
Damage due to Bird Hits and Foreign Objects
Safety and aviation
Good safety Culture
Tool management for safe maintenance
Aircraft Drift – Causes and Concerns
Safety aspects of short landings.
Inculcating a safety culture
Air Ambulance: Potential, challenges and prospects
Harnessing Technology for Innovative Flight Safety in Military Aviation.
Unintended Targets: Accidental Aircraft Shootdowns
Deadly Fortnight - Nine Air Crashes - Several Lessons
From Shock To Action: Managing Startle Effect In Military Flying

Defence Industry

Indigenous defence industry
HAL and DPSUs
Role of the private sector in defence production
Arms Transfer to Afghanistan
Defence Budget Issues
Atmanirbharta
Exportability of LCA and Brahmos combined package
IAF and indigenisation
Indian Initiatives to promote self-reliance
Tejas export options
Russia – India Defence contracts past, present and future.
EU's defence spending
Aero India 2021 & 2023
Arms Trade: Trends and Concerns
Arms trade: flow vis-à-vis hot spots
Expanding the footprint of Boeing in India
Decoding the US presence at Aero India 2023
Global Military Spending: Trends and Catalysts
Tejas: A delayed dream can become a nightmare
Conflicts, Military spending and arms transfer 2024.
Apache Helicopters' delivery is delayed
Aviation MRO Trends and Challenges
The Evolving Aviation MRO Industry And India's Opportunity
Previewing Aero India 2025
India's Journey in Fighter Aircraft Design and Manufacture: Challenges and Successes
Aero India 2025: Showcasing the Future of Aerospace Defence
Aero India 2025 And Key Solutions For IAF's Challenges
Aero India 2025: catalysing Atmanirbharta through Global Collaboration.
Involvement Of The Private Sector In Indian Fighter Jet Production
The Geo-politics of Fighter Exports and Joint Ventures
IAF's Wings of Indigenisation: The IAF-HAL Saga
Navigating the Industrial Revolution: The Role of India's Industrial Policy
Technology Harvesting by Indian Aerospace Industry: A Strategic Imperative.
AMCA Programme execution Model: A New Era for India's Defence Production
Balancing Cost and Combat Capability in Fighter Jet Procurement

India

Understanding Manipur Dynamics
Indian foreign policy and defence diplomacy
Meghalaya Dynamics
Transparency, Accountability and Threats to Independent Institutions of Democracy
Caste-based reservations.
Examining the examination system in India.
Independence Day special – Applicability of the ancient Indian philosophy of 'Vasudhaiva Kutumbakam' (the world is one family) in modern diplomacy and global engagements.
India at the Crossroads of Trump 2.0
Synergising India's Military and Diplomatic Goals.
Important battles of the Indian subcontinent: Significance and lessons
Honouring the Veterans: India remembers its braves.
Youth Power and National Vision 2047
Rare Earth as Rare Weapon: India's Opportunity and Challenge

Book/Peer Reviews and Endorsements

1946: Last War of Independence: Royal Indian Navy Mutiny by Pramod Kapur
1962 Border War: Territorial Dispute and Beyond by Ismail Vergasseri
The Politics of South China Sea Disputes By Nehginpao Kipgen
1965 A Western Sunrise: India's War With Pakistan By Shiv Kunal Verma
The Game Behind Saffron Terror by Kanwar Khatana
Peer Review - “The Rising Aerospace Power: Implications for India”
Peer Review - “MRO as a strategic asset”
Peer Review: Indigenisation of Indian AD
Book Endorsement - "Greatest Air Aces of All Time" by Air Marshal Anil Chopra
Book Endorsement - The 1971 Indo-Pak Air War: Reflections and Projections
Peer review of a paper on the Global challenges of soft power.
Peer review: Making a Case for India's Air Defence Indigenisation: Challenges & Prospects
Peer Review: Mitigating the Irregular and Hybrid Warfare Threats to India
Book Review: The Balochistan Conundrum by Tilak Devasher
Book Review: The Four Ages of American Foreign Policy By Michael Mandelbaum
Peer Review: Need for a Strategic Bomber in India's Security Dynamics
Book Review: The Personal is Political by Aruna Roy
Book Review: Walking Barefoot the Tilonia Way
Book Review: 7 seconds to die by John C Antal
Peer Review of paper on “AI and Future of Aircraft Maintenance.”
Peer Review of paper on “Winning Future Battles With Firepower”
Peer Review of paper on “Dollarisation of the international Financial system.”
Book Review: Tales of the Elite by Vivek Anathakrishnan.
Peer Review of paper on “The India-Middle East-EU Economic Corridor (IMEC): Pipe Dream or a Pathway to Shared Progress”.
Peer Review of Paper on “AI-Driven Multimedia Forensics: A Global Imperative for Journalism and Justice in India and the United States”
Peer Review of paper on “Reimagining Tech-Powered, Military Transformation in the Intelligence Age”

Stories

My Tryst with HT-2 aircraft: The day god flew with me
The day I flew my dad's car.
Malse Lake: Tale of two coursemates
Flying Tales
Tribute to Air Mshl PK Dey “Remembering Dadu: Self-Made Legend
SHIQURDU: 50 + posts of simplified Deep-meaning thoughts in Hurdu (a mix of Hindi and Urdu)
Remembering Dadu: Self-Made Legend
Podcasts
Multi-national Exercise Tarang Shakti with DPR, MOD on “Raksha Sutra”
Independence Day Special with Pankaj Sharma on “Let’s Talk”.
Podcast with Santosh Kumar on “Between US”
Life in IAF and broader issues with Gaurav on “Speak with Gaurav.”
Podcast with Vels University students.
Podcast with Gana on “Blue Skies Podcast”
Podcast with Ashtosh Garg on “The Brand Called You – TBCY”
Podcast with VIF-Vivekanand International Foundation on “Technology and Air Warfare.”
Podcast with VIF-Vivekanand International Foundation on “Use of Airpower in NWNP scenario”
Life of a Fighter Pilot on Empowerment talks
Podcast with Gaurav Arya of Chanakya forum on IAF capability building (2,45,000+ Views).
Podcast with LetsTalkIt on Good Working Culture
Podcast with Let's Talk It on Growth Mindset
Podcast with Dinesh K Vohra of News Times on IAF Challenges and Preparedness

== Personal life ==
Khosla is married to Mrs Deepshikha Khosla and has two sons. He is a keen golfer and billiards/Snooker player. He is an Asia level puzzle solver and has participated in Sudoku nationals for the last fifteen years and puzzle solving nationals for five years.

Military offices
Preceded by Shirish Baban Deo	Vice Chief of Air Staff; 1 October 2018 - 30 April 2019	Succeeded by Rakesh Kumar Singh Bhadauria
Preceded by Chandrashekharan Hari Kumar	Air Officer Commanding-in-Chief, Eastern Air Command; 1 January 2017 - 30 September 2018	Succeeded by Raghunath Nambiar
Preceded by Shirish Baban Deo	Director General Air Operations; 2015 - 2016	Succeeded by Harjit Singh Arora
