= Ravinder Kumar Dhir =

Indian air force officer

Air Marshal Ravinder Kumar Dhir PVSM, AVSM, VM, ADC
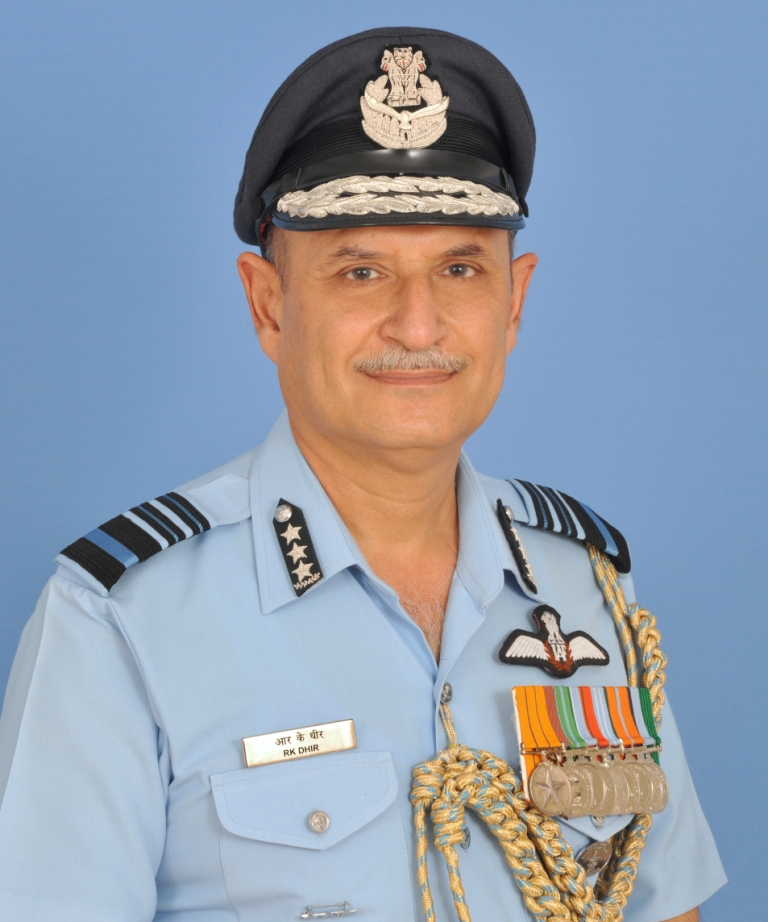
- Spouse: Neelam Dhir
- Military career
- Allegiance: India
- Branch: Indian Air Force
- Service years: 15 June 1979 – 29 September 2018
- Rank: Air Marshal
- Service number: 15678
- Commands: South Western Air Command
- Awards: Param Vishisht Seva Medal; Ati Vishisht Seva Medal; Vayu Sena Medal ADC

Air Marshal Ravinder Kumar Dhir PVSM, AVSM, VM, ADC is an advisor to Gujarat state for 'Defence and Aerospace Industries'. He was Air Officer Commanding-in-Chief (AOC-in-C), South Western Air Command of the Indian Air Force from 1 June 2015 to 29 September 2018. He took over from Air Marshal Birender Singh Dhanoa and was succeeded by Air Marshal Harjit Singh Arora.

== Early life and education ==
Dhir is an alumnus of National Defence Academy, Pune. and Sainik School Kunjpura Karnal Haryana.

== Career ==
Dhir was commissioned into the fighter stream of the Indian Air Force on 15 June 1979. He has clocked over 3200 hours of flying on more than 25 different types of aircraft to date. He held several key operational and administrative appointments at various stages of his service including as a project test pilot in the Bison upgrade project in Russia; Commander of the first Bison Squadron "Cobras" at Ambala; Commander of a frontline operational air base; Principal Director Air Staff Requirements at Air HQ; Technical Manager (Air) at the Acquisition Wing in Ministry of Defence; Air Defence Commander at South Western Air Command; Senior Air Staff Officer at South Western Air Command and Senior Air Staff Officer at Southern Air Command. He is a Qualified Flying Instructor, an experimental test pilot, Commander of the Air Force Test Pilots School and provided input to the Tejas LCA project at Aeronautical Development Establishment.

== Awards and medals ==
During the 39 years of his career, he has been awarded the Param Vishisht Seva Medal, Ati Vishisht Seva Medal (January 2012) and the Vayu Sena Medal (January 2006).

Param Vishisht Seva Medal	Ati Vishisht Seva Medal		Vayusena Medal
Samanya Seva Medal	Operation Parakram Medal	Sainya Seva Medal	Videsh Seva Medal
50th Anniversary of Independence Medal	30 Years Long Service Medal	20 Years Long Service Medal	9 Years Long Service Medal

== Personal life ==
Dhir is married to Neelam Dhir, an educator, and they have two children.

Military offices
Preceded by Birender Singh Dhanoa	Air Officer Commanding-in-Chief, South Western Air Command; 1 June 2015 – 29 September 2018	Succeeded by Harjit Singh Arora
