= Deepika Misra =

Indian officer and helicopter pilot

Deepika Misra is an Indian Air Force (IAF) officer and helicopter pilot. She is the first woman officer to receive a gallantry award in Indian Air Force. She was awarded (Gallantry) the Vayu Sena Medal for as a honour for assistance and disaster relief operations during floods in Madhya Pradesh in 2021.

== Career ==
Deepika Misra graduated from the Air Force Academy in December 2006. In Indian Air Force she was commissioned in helicopter stream. She fly Chetak and Cheetah (single engine helicopters) and gained around 1600 flying hours on the two helicopters.

India Air Force introduced changes in 2010 that allowed women helicopter pilots to convert to twin engine, medium and heavy-lift helicopter types. Misra volunteered for the Sarang helicopter team and after selection, joined the team in 2014.

Deepika Misra and Sandeep Singh became the first women officers to join the Sarang team in February 2015.

== Flood rescue operation ==
Deepika Misra was assigned to conduct Humanitarian Assistance and Disaster Relief operations due to flash floods in northern regions of Madhya Pradesh on 2 August 2021.

The operation included evacuations and winching of people from flooded areas. The rescue operation continued for eight days, during which 47 people were rescued, according to the Ministry of Defence.

== Awards and recognition ==
Deepika Misra was awarded the Vayu Sena Medal (Gallantry). The award was announced by the Smt Droupadi Murmu, President of India in 2022.

She received the medal in New Delhi on 20 April 2023. She is the first woman officer of the service to receive a gallantry award (According to Indian Air Force).
