= Sunderraman Neelakantan =

Indian Air Officer Commanding-in-Chief

Air Marshal Sunderraman Neelakantan PVSM, YSM, VM
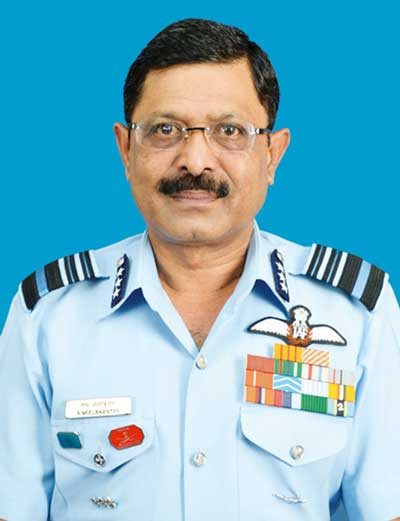
- Spouse: Uma Neelakantan
- Children: 1 son and 1 daughter
- Military career
- Allegiance: India
- Branch: Indian Air Force
- Service years: December 1977 - 1 March 2017
- Rank: Air Marshal
- Service number: 15184
- Commands: Southern Air Command; Air Officer in Charge of Personnel; Director General of Inspection and Safety
- Awards: Param Vishisht Seva Medal; Yudh Seva Medal; Vayu Sena Medal

Air Marshal Sunderraman Neelakantan PVSM, YSM, VM, is a retired officer and was Air Officer Commanding-in-Chief (AOC-in-C), Southern Air Command of the Indian Air Force from 1 August 2016 to 1 March 2017. He was succeeded by Air Marshal Rakesh Kumar Singh Bhadauria.

== Career ==
Neelakantan was commissioned as a fighter pilot in Indian Air Force in December 1977. He is an alumnus of National Defence Academy and Defence Services Staff College, Wellington and Tactics and Air Combat Development Establishment (TACDE). He is a recipient of Presidential awards Param Vishisht Seva Medal the Yudh Seva Medal and the Vayu Sena Medal.

A flight instructor and Fighter Combat Leader, he has flown over 3100 hours on various types of aircraft, and commanded a frontline fighter squadron and two flying bases. During 2006–07, he led the IAF contingent in Congo as part of the United Nations Peace Keeping Force.

He served as Director General of Inspection & Safety at Air Headquarters from 1 July 2014 to 1 February 2015. He also served as Air Officer in charge Personnel (AOP) at Air Headquarters (Vayu Bhawan) from 2 February 2015 to 31 July 2016.

== Personal life ==
Neelakantan is married to Uma Neelakantan. Together they have a daughter and a son. He is an active sportsman who plays golf, cricket and badminton. He is a qualified open water scuba diver. His hobbies include cooking, reading and travel.

== Awards and medals ==
In his 40 years of career, Neelakantan has been awarded several medals: the Param Vishisht Seva Medal (January 2017), the Yudh Seva Medal and the Vayu Sena Medal (Gallantry).

Param Vishisht Seva Medal	Yudh Seva Medal		Vayusena Medal
General Service Medal	Samanya Seva Medal	Operation Vijay Star	Operation Vijay Medal
Sainya Seva Medal	High Altitude Service Medal	Videsh Seva Medal	50th Anniversary of Independence Medal
30 Years Long Service Medal	20 Years Long Service Medal	9 Years Long Service Medal	MONUC

Military offices
Preceded by Jasbir Walia	Air Officer Commanding-in-Chief, Southern Air Command; 1 August 2016 – 1 March 2017	Succeeded by Rakesh Kumar Singh Bhadauria
