= Tactics and Air Combat Development Establishment =

Indian Air Force training unit

Tactics and Air Combat Development Establishment or TACDE is an Indian Air Force unit for training aerial combat to its top one percent fighter pilots. TACDE is based in Gwalior. It was conferred Presidential standard in 2009. The institution evolves tactical procedures for various aircraft, implements standard operating procedures and trains pilots in operational doctrines.

== History ==
On 1 February 1971, TACDE was founded by Wing Commander A. K. Mukherjee alongside Squadron Leader R S Chib as Tactics and Combat Development and Training Squadron (T&CD&TS) at Adampur, Punjab. The formation was re-designated as TACDE in December 1972. The institution has numerous awards and honors including Vir Chakra and Kirti Chakra. TACDE was awarded ‘Battle Honours’ by the President of India in 1995 for its role in the Indo-Pak conflict of 1971.

TACDE was eventually relocated to Gwalior, transforming the airbase into a crucible for refining India’s aerial combat doctrine. The base’s long runways and proximity to restricted airspace made it ideal for hosting live training and advanced fighter tactics development. Today, TACDE and the Mirage squadrons at Gwalior form a critical training and operational axis within the IAF.

=== TACDE fighters collision on 28 January 2023 ===
On the morning of 28 January 2023, three TACDE pilots, including a Mirage 2000H instructor pilot, were involved in a mid-air collision involving a TACDE dual-seat Su-30MKI and a TACDE single-seat Mirage 2000H. The Mirage-2000H pilot, Wing Commander Hanumanth Rao Sarathi, was unable to eject and died in the accident, whilst the two other pilots, flying the Su-30MKI, ejected and were hospitalized with minor injuries. Both fighter jets had taken off from Gwalior for a training mission.

== Inventory ==
- Mirage 2000
- Sukhoi Su-30MKI
- Mikoyan MiG-29

== Notable alumni ==
- Pradeep Vasant Naik
- Anil Yashwant Tipnis
- Srinivasapuram Krishnaswamy
- Jasbir Walia
- Chandrashekharan Hari Kumar
- Sunderraman Neelakantan
- Balakrishnan Suresh
- Diptendu Choudhury
- Bhawana Kanth

== See also ==
- College of Air Warfare
- Combat Commanders' School (Pakistan)
- Indian National Defence University
- Military Academies in India
- Sainik School
- United States Navy Strike Fighter Tactics Instructor program
- Vijeta- 1982 Bollywood movie
