= Vice Chief of the Air Staff (India) =

Deputy to the Chief of the Air Staff of India

- Flag of Air Marshal

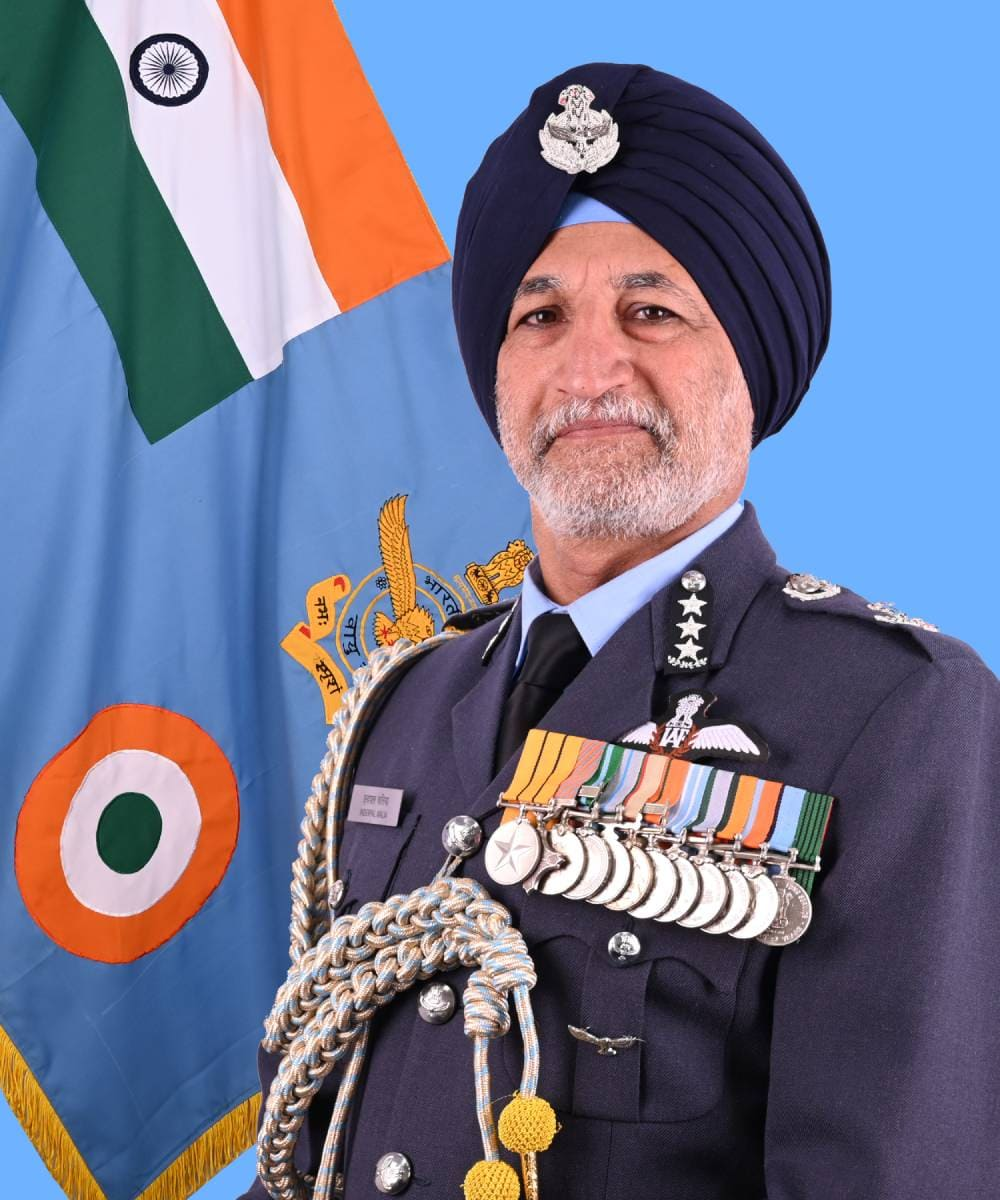
- Incumbent; Air Marshal Inderpal Singh Walia; AVSM VM since 1 November 2026
- Indian Air Force
- Status: Second in Command
- Abbreviation: VCAS
- Reports to: Chief of the Air Staff
- Residence: Bungalow 5, Akbar Road, New Delhi, Delhi 110011, India.
- Seat: Air Headquarters, New Delhi
- Appointer: ACC
- Constituting instrument: Air Forces Act, 1952 (62 of 1952)
- Formation: 1 January 1963; 63 years ago
- First holder: Atma Ram Nanda
- Deputy: Deputy Chief of the Air Staff

The Vice Chief of the Air Staff (VCAS) is a statutory office held by the second-highest ranking officer of the Indian Air Force (IAF). Customarily held by a three-star air marshal, the VCAS is the senior most Principal Staff Officer (PSO) to the Chief of the Air Staff (CAS) - the professional head of the IAF. By duty, the VCAS has dual roles: in wartime, to oversee operational planning, capability build-up and force deployment during wartime; in peacetime, to act as an understudy to the CAS during peacetime.

The current VCAS is Air Marshal Inderpal Singh Walia, who assumed the office on 1 November 2026.

== History ==
At the time of independence of India on 15 August 1947, Air Commodore Subroto Mukerjee was appointed Deputy Air Commander, Royal Indian Air Force, in addition to being Senior Air Staff Officer (SASO) at the newly-formed Air HQ. On 15 November the same year, he was promoted to the acting rank of Air Vice Marshal.

In 1949, the RIAF was reorganised and the post was re-designated Deputy Chief of the Air Staff (DCAS). The DCAS continued to be the Deputy Air Commander. On 1 January 1963, the post of Vice Chief of the Air Staff was created and became the second-highest post of the Indian Air Force.

The office of VCAS was first held by Air Vice Marshal Diwan Atma Ram Nanda. The appointment was then in the two-star rank of air vice marshal. On 15 January 1966, the office was raised to the three-star rank of Air Marshal and Pratap Chandra Lal was promoted to the rank.

== Order of Precedence ==
The VCAS ranks at No. 23 on the Indian order of precedence, along with the Vice Chiefs of the Indian Army and Indian Navy and the Army Commanders (GOC-in-C), Naval Commanders (FOC-in-C) and Air Commanders (AOC-in-C).

The VCAS is at the Apex Pay grade (Grade 17), with a monthly pay of ₹225,000 (US$3,200).

== Appointment ==
The Vice Chief of Air staff is appointed by the Appointments Committee of the Cabinet, chaired by the Prime Minister, from among the senior general officers of the Air Force. Since the appointment is of Commander-in-Chief grade, the appointees are usually one of the Air Commanders of the six operational commands.

Unlike the Chief of Air Staff, there is no fixed term nor term limit to the position of the VCAS, although most of those appointed to the office have typically served for one or two year tenures and serve until the age of 60.

== Appointees ==
The following table chronicles the appointees to the office of the Vice Chief of the Air Staff.

No.	Rank	Portrait	Name	Assumed office	Left office	CAS	References
1	Air Vice Marshal		Diwan Atma Ram Nanda	1 January 1963	4 August 1963	Air Marshal Apsy Engineer	
2	Air Vice Marshal		Arjan Singh	5 August 1963	31 July 1964	Air Marshal Apsy Engineer	
3	Air Vice Marshal		Pratap Chandra Lal	1 October 1964	14 January 1966	Marshal of the Indian Air Force Arjan Singh	
3	Air Marshal		Pratap Chandra Lal	15 January 1966	1 September 1966	Marshal of the Indian Air Force Arjan Singh	
4	Air Marshal		Ramaswamy Rajaram	13 December 1966	18 June 1969	Marshal of the Indian Air Force Arjan Singh	
5	Air Marshal		Shivdev Singh	15 July 1969	31 March 1973	ACM. Lal	
5	Air Marshal		Shivdev Singh	15 July 1969	31 March 1973	ACM. Mehra	
6	Air Marshal		Yeshwant Vinayak Malse	1 April 1973	30 September 1973	ACM. Mehra	
7	Air Marshal		Hari Chand Dewan	1 October 1973	31 March 1976	ACM. Mehra	
7	Air Marshal		Hari Chand Dewan	1 October 1973	31 March 1976	ACM. H Moolgavkar	
8	Air Marshal		Anand Ramdas Pandit	1 April 1976	31 March 1977	ACM. H Moolgavkar	
9	Air Marshal		Devaiah Subia	1 April 1977	19 May 1977	ACM. H Moolgavkar	
10	Air Marshal		Idris Hasan Latif	20 May 1977	31 August 1978	ACM. H Moolgavkar	
11	Air Marshal		Edul Jahangir Dhatigara	4 September 1978	31 January 1980	ACM.Latif	
12	Air Marshal		Lal Singh Grewal	1 February 1980	31 December 1980	ACM.Latif	
13	Air Marshal		Dilbagh Singh	1 January 1981	31 August 1981	ACM.Latif	
14	Air Marshal		Trilochan Singh Brar	22 September 1981	31 December 1983	ACM. Singh	
15	Air Marshal		Jagdish Raj Bhasin	1 January 1984	31 October 1984	ACM. Singh	
15	Air Marshal		Jagdish Raj Bhasin	1 January 1984	31 October 1984	ACM. Katre	
16	Air Marshal		Prem Pal Singh	1 November 1984	7 January 1986	ACM. Katre	
16	Air Marshal		Prem Pal Singh	1 November 1984	7 January 1986	ACM. Fontaine	
17	Air Marshal		Subramaniam Raghavendran	8 January 1986	29 February 1988	ACM. Fontaine	
18	Air Marshal		Nirmal Chandra Suri	1 March 1988	31 July 1991	ACM. Fontaine	
18	Air Marshal		Nirmal Chandra Suri	1 March 1988	31 July 1991	ACM. Mehra	
19	Air Marshal		Palamadai Muthuswamy Ramachandran	14 October 1991	28 February 1993	ACM. Suri	
20	Air Marshal		Pondicherry Jayarao Jayakumar	1 March 1993	30 April 1994	ACM. Suri	
20	Air Marshal		Pondicherry Jayarao Jayakumar	1 March 1993	30 April 1994	ACM. Kaul	
21	Air Marshal		Pratap Rao	6 June 1994	31 July 1995	ACM. Kaul	
22	Air Marshal		Satish Kumar Sareen	1 August 1995	31 December 1995	ACM. Kaul	
23	Air Marshal		Trevor Raymond Joseph Osman	1 January 1996	31 March 1997	ACM. Sareen	
24	Air Marshal		Anil Yashwant Tipnis	1 April 1997	31 December 1998	ACM. Sareen	
25	Air Marshal		Prithvi Singh Brar	4 January 1999	31 July 2000	ACM. Tipnis	
26	Air Marshal		Vinod Patney	1 August 2000	31 July 2001	ACM. Tipnis	
27	Air Marshal		Srinivasapuram Krishnaswamy	1 August 2001	31 December 2001	ACM. Tipnis	
28	Air Marshal		Satish Govind Inamdar	1 January 2002	31 January 2003	ACM. Krishnawamy	
29	Air Marshal		Michael McMahon	1 February 2003	30 September 2004	ACM. Krishnawamy	
30	Air Marshal		Sunil Kumar Malik	1 October 2004	31 July 2005	ACM. Krishnawamy	
30	Air Marshal		Sunil Kumar Malik	1 October 2004	31 July 2005	ACM. Tyagi	
31	Air Marshal		Ajit Bhavnani	22 August 2005	31 October 2006	ACM. Tyagi	
32	Air Marshal		B. N. Gokhale	1 November 2006	31 December 2007	ACM. Tyagi	
32	Air Marshal		B. N. Gokhale	1 November 2006	31 December 2007	ACM. F H Major	
33	Air Marshal		Pradeep Vasant Naik	1 January 2008	31 May 2009	ACM. F H Major	
34	Air Marshal		Pranab Kumar Barbora	1 June 2009	31 December 2010	ACM. P V Naik	
35	Air Marshal		Norman Anil Kumar Browne	1 January 2011	31 July 2011	ACM. P V Naik	
36	Air Marshal		Krishan Kumar Nohwar	1 August 2011	31 May 2012	ACM. Browne	
37	Air Marshal		Dinesh Chandra Kumaria	1 June 2012	30 June 2013	ACM. Browne	
38	Air Marshal		Arup Raha	1 July 2013	31 December 2013	ACM. Browne	
39	Air Marshal		Ravi Kant Sharma	31 December 2013	30 May 2015	ACM. Raha	
40	Air Marshal		Birender Singh Dhanoa	31 May 2015	31 December 2016	ACM. Raha	
41	Air Marshal		Shirish Baban Deo	31 December 2016	30 September 2018	ACM. Dhanoa	
42	Air Marshal		Anil Khosla	1 October 2018	30 April 2019	ACM. Dhanoa	
43	Air Marshal		Rakesh Kumar Singh Bhadauria	1 May 2019	30 September 2019	ACM. Dhanoa	
44	Air Marshal		Harjit Singh Arora	1 October 2019	30 June 2021	ACM. Bhadauria	
45	Air Marshal		Vivek Ram Chaudhari	1 July 2021	30 September 2021	ACM. Bhadauria	
46	Air Marshal		Sandeep Singh	1 October 2021	31 January 2023	ACM. Chaudhari	
47	Air Marshal		Amar Preet Singh	1 February 2023	30 September 2024	ACM. Chaudhari	
48	Air Marshal		Sujeet Pushpakar Dharkar	3 October 2024	30 April 2025	ACM. A P Singh	
49	Air Marshal		Narmdeshwar Tiwari	2 May 2025	31 December 2025	ACM. A P Singh	
50	Air Marshal		Nagesh Kapoor	1 January 2026	30 June 2026	ACM. A P Singh	
51	Air Marshal		Ashutosh Dixit	1 July 2026	31 October 2026	ACM. A P Singh	
52	Air Marshal		Inderpal Singh Walia	1 November 2026	Incumbent	ACM. Dixit	

== Notes ==
1.Later promoted to the post of the Chief of Air Staff.

== See also ==
- Chief of the Air Staff
- Deputy Chief of the Air Staff
- Vice Chief of the Army Staff
- Vice Chief of the Naval Staff
