= Vayu Sena Medal =

Military medal from India

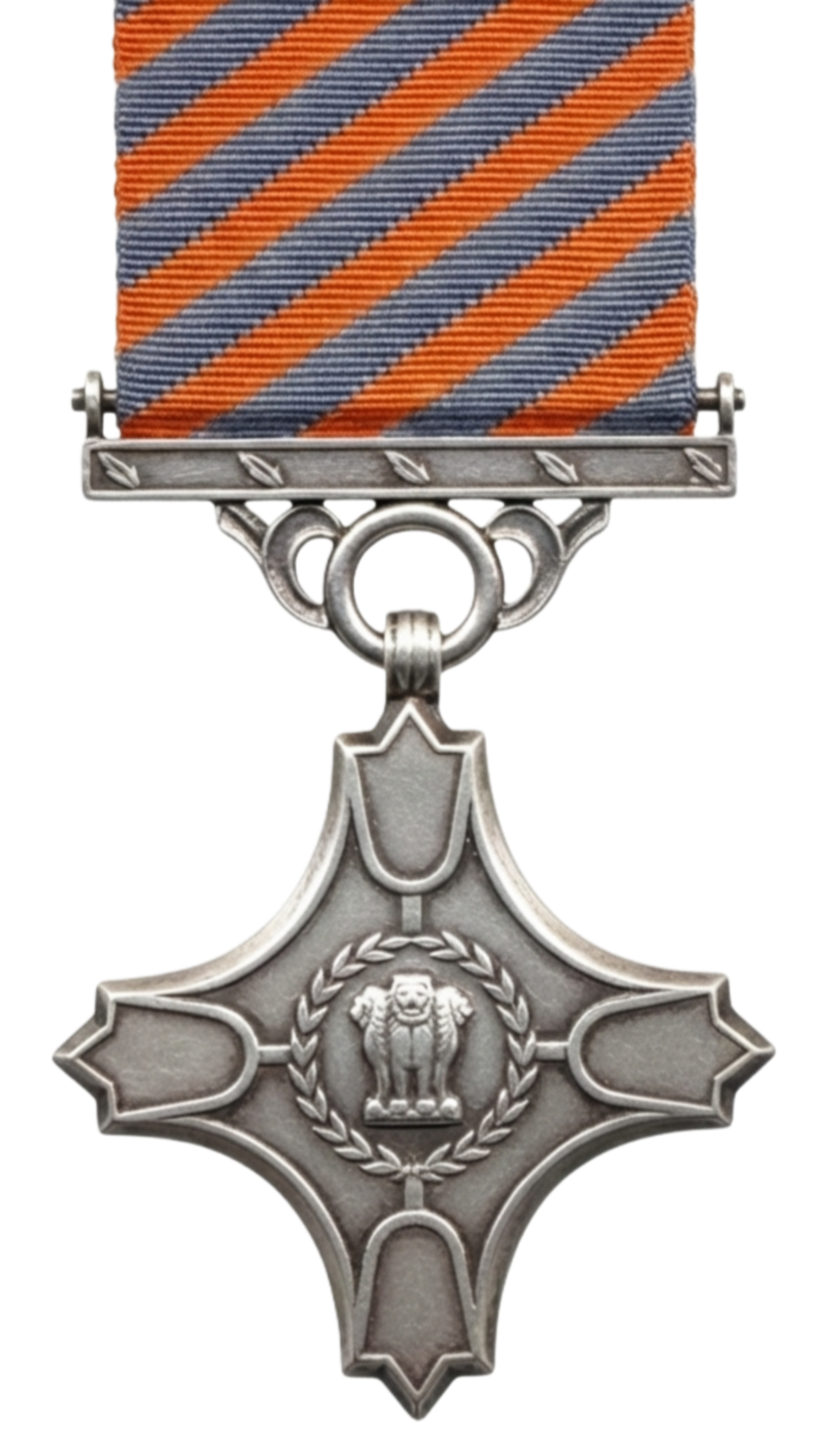
- Medal and its ribbon
- Type: Military medal
- Awarded for: Awarded for such individual acts of exceptional devotion to duty or courage as have special significance for the Air Force.
- Country: India
- Presented by: Indian Air Force
- Eligibility: All ranks of the Air Force
- Post-nominals: VM
- First award: 1960

Highlights
- Total recipients: More than 1000

Order of Wear
- Next (higher): Yudh Seva Medal
- Equivalent: Sena Medal (Army); Nau Sena Medal (Navy)
- Next (lower): Vishisht Seva Medal

The Vayu Sena Medal (lit. 'Air Force Medal') is a military decoration, usually awarded in peacetime for a job well done in the Indian Air Force. However, it has been granted during times of conflict for acts of gallantry in the face of enemy, though not in the same numbers as the Vir Chakra.

Posthumous awards may be made and a bar is authorized for subsequent awards of the Vayu Sena Medal.

The VM was established on 17 June 1960 by the President of India and awards have been made from 1961 onwards. Awards over the past decade or more have been classified into two categories. One is Vayu Sena Medal (Gallantry) and the other for Vayu Sena Medal (Devotion to Duty).

== History ==
The Vayu Sena Medal was instituted on 26 January 1960 by the Government of India, with the approval of the President of India. Five other medals were instituted on the same day - the Vishisht Seva Medal series (Class I, Class II, Class III), (Note: These awards were later renamed Param Vishisht Seva Medal, Ati Vishisht Seva Medal and Vishisht Seva Medal respectively.) Sainya Seva Medal, Videsh Seva Medal, Sena Medal and the Nao Sena Medal.

== Description ==
Obverse: A four-armed silver star with the points shaped like lotus blooms. In the centre, the national emblem. Suspended by a straight bar suspender and normally named and dated on the edge.

Reverse: A Himalayan Eagle with wings spread, and the legend, above and below, in Hindi "Vayu Sena Medal" or "Air Force / Medal".

Ribbon: 30 mm, alternating 2 mm diagonal (lower left to upper right) stripes of grey and orange-saffron. The ribbon has an overall "woven" appearance.

== Examples of recipients ==
To understand the award better, a sample recipient would be that of the second-award bar to Squadron Leader Harchand Singh Gill, Indian Air Force:

In October 1953, a composite column of Assam Rifles and a Civil Administrative party was attacked by armed Tagins and some officers and men were killed. Sqn-Ldr. H. S. Gill was in command of the detachment of Dakotas for the airlanding of troops. The work of airlanding personnel and supplies on the two small available landing grounds was difficult. Notwithstanding the difficulties Sqn.-Ldr. Gill with his keen enthusiasm, boundless energy and courage personally carried out the major portion of the landings at Doporijo. By his tireless work, the airlift which had appeared impossible, became a reality. He showed courage and devotion to duty of the highest order.

—

Sqn-Ldr. H.S. Gill was born in Mullanpur, Punjab, India. He was born on 25 March 1925.

== See also ==
- Sena Medal
- Nao Sena Medal
