= Malarikkal =

Indian village in Kottayam, Kerala

Malarikkal മലരിക്കൽ
- Village
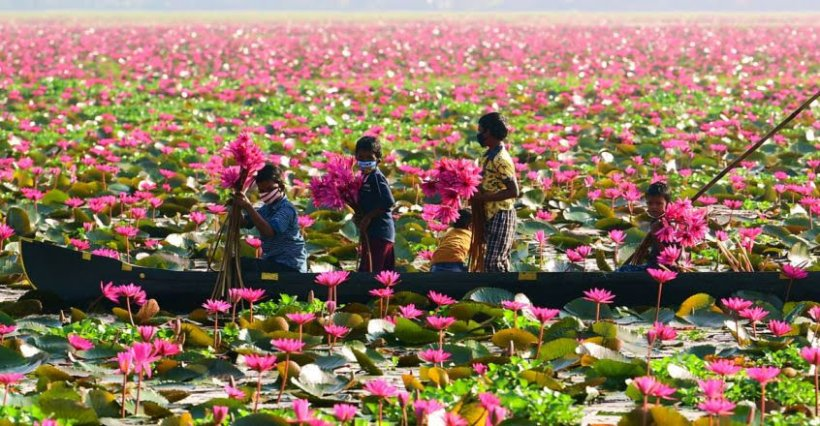
- Malarikkal water lily field

- Location in Kerala, India Malarikkal (India)
- Coordinates: 9.55911°N 76.49138°E
- Country: India
- State: Kerala
- District: Kottayam

Languages
  - Official: Malayalam, English
- Time zone: UTC+5:30 (IST)
- PIN: 686030
- Telephone code: 0481
- ISO 3166 code: IN-KL
- Vehicle registration: KL-05

Malarikkal is a small tourism hamlet located in Thiruvarpu panchayat in Kottayam town of Kerala, India. It is a tourist destination known for its water lily fields.

== Places nearby ==
- Thiruvarppu
- Kumarakom
- Chengalam South
- Vaikom
- Kottayam

== Economy ==
Fishing, agriculture and tourism are the major economic activities. The tropical climate supports cultivation in the area. The area has expanses of mangrove forests, paddy fields and coconut groves. Fruits including Banana, Mango, Jackfruit, Ambazhanga, Puli (Tamarind), Chaambenga, Peraycka (Guava), Aathaycka and Pineapple are grown here. Cocoa, coffee, chena (yam) and chembu (colocasia) are also cultivated, typically under the coconut trees. The area is irrigated by waterways and canals connected to the Meenachil river. The smaller canals are often lined by hibiscus plants, which grow over the canals forming a canopy of foliage and flowers.

== Modes of access ==
One can access Malarikkal by many means:

- By air: via Cochin International Airport approximately 84.3 kilometres (52 mi) or Thiruvananthapuram International Airport, approximately 161 kilometres (100 mi)
- By rail: via Kottayam - approximately 7.6 kilometres (5 mi).
- By road:KSRTC(6.9 kilometres) Buses and taxis are easily available at all times of the day from Kottayam.
