= Gurcharan Singh Bedi =

Indian air marshal

Air Marshal Gurcharan Singh Bedi AVSM, VM, VSM
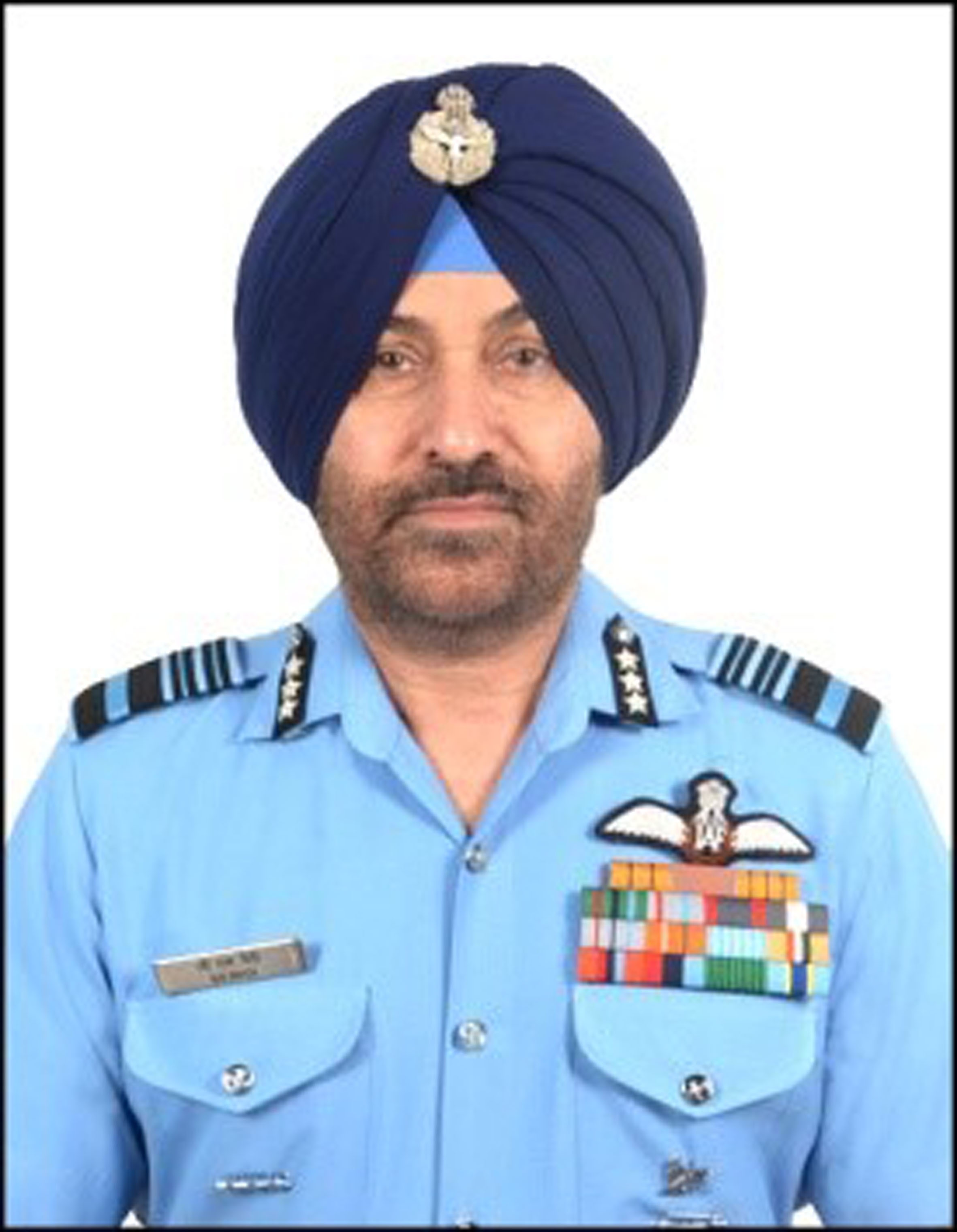
- Military career
- Allegiance: India
- Branch: Indian Air Force
- Service years: 8 June 1984 – 30 April 2022
- Rank: Air Marshal
- Service number: 17448
- Awards: Ati Vishisht Seva Medal; Vayusena Medal; Vishisht Seva Medal

Air Marshal Gurcharan Singh Bedi, AVSM, VM, VSM is a retired officer of the Indian Air Force. He served as the Director General of Inspection and Flight Safety. He assumed the office on 1 February 2021 succeeding Air Marshal Manavendra Singh. Previously, he served as Senior Air Staff Officer of Eastern Air Command.

== Early life and education ==
Gurcharan Singh Bedi is an alumnus of Defence Services Staff College and National Defence College.

== Career ==
Gurcharan Singh Bedi was commissioned in the Indian Air Force as a fighter pilot on 8 June 1984. In a career spanning over 37 years, he has as over 3,700 hours of flying experience and is a qualified flying instructor and served as a fighter combat leader.

He has also commanded various front line bases along with peacekeeping mission in Democratic Republic of Congo.

Prior to his appointment as Director General of Inspection and Flight Safety, he served as Senior Air Staff Officer of Eastern Air Command.

== Honours and decorations ==
During his career, Gurcharan Singh Bedi was awarded Ati Vishist Seva Medal in January 2020, Vayu Sena Medal in August 1999, Vishisht Seva Medal in 2010. for his service.

Ati Vishisht Seva Medal	Vayu Sena Medal	Vishisht Seva Medal

Military offices
Preceded by Manavendra Singh	Director General - Inspection and Flight Safety; 1 February 2021 – 30 April 2022	Succeeded by Sanjeev Kapoor
Preceded by Vivek Ram Chaudhari	Senior Air Staff Officer - Eastern Air Command; 1 August 2020 – 31 January 2021	Succeeded by Amar Preet Singh
Preceded by Manavendra Singh	Senior Air Staff Officer - Southern Air Command; 4 May 2020 – 31 July 2020	Succeeded by Jonnalagedda Chalapati
