= Jasvir =

Jasvir is a given name of Indian origin.

== List of people with the given name ==
- Jasvir Deol (born 1968/1969), Canadian politician
- Jasvir Rakkar (born 1991), Canadian baseball player
- Jasvir Singh (disambiguation), multiple people

== See also ==
- Jasbir (disambiguation)
