= Manavendra Singh =

Air Marshal Manavendra Singh PVSM, AVSM, VrC, VSM, ADC
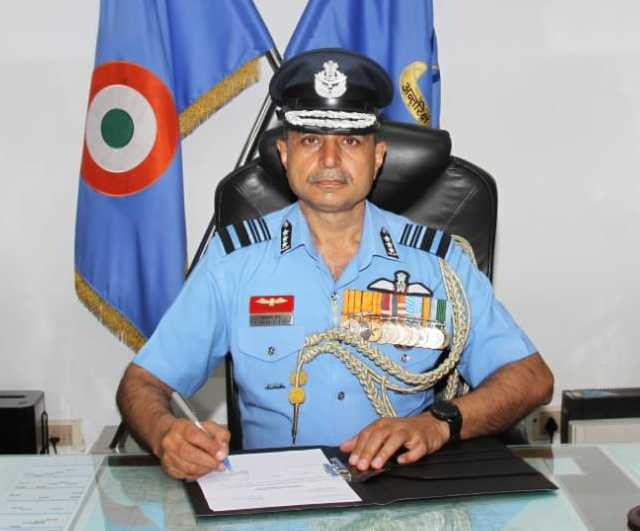

Personal details
- Awards: Param Vishisht Seva Medal; Ati Vishisht Seva Medal; Vir Chakra; Vishisht Seva Medal

Military service
- Allegiance: India
- Branch/service: Indian Air Force
- Years of service: 29 December 1982 – 31 December 2022
- Rank: Air Marshal
- Unit: No. 115 Helicopter Unit
- Commands: Training Command; Southern Air Command
- Service number: 16983

Air Marshal Manavendra Singh, PVSM, AVSM, VrC, VSM, ADC is a retired officer of the Indian Air Force. He served as the Air Officer Commanding-in-Chief (AOC-in-C), Training Command. He assumed the office on 25 September 2021 succeeding Air Marshal Rajiv Dayal Mathur. Previously, he served as Air Officer Commanding-in-Chief, Southern Air Command.

== Early life and education ==
Manavendra Singh is an alumnus of National Defence Academy. He is also a graduate of Army War College, Defence Services Staff College and Joint Forces Staff College, Norfolk, Virginia.

== Career ==
Manavendra Singh was commissioned in the Indian Air Force as a helicopter pilot on 29 December 1982. In a career spanning over 40 years, he has as over 6,600 hours of flying experience and has a service experience in various sectors like the Siachen, the North East, Uttarakhand, the Western desert.

He has commanded front line bases in Bukavu, DRC during peacekeeping mission.

Prior to his appointment as AOC-in-C, Southern Air command, he served as Director General of Inspection and Flight Safety.

In December 2021, he was appointed as the head of the Tri-Services Inquiry to investigate the reason of Coonoor Mi-17 Crash which claimed the life of 14 including CDS Gen. Bipin Rawat and his Wife.

He superannuated on 31 December 2022 after 40 years of service and was succeeded by Air Marshal Jonnalagedda Chalapati as the AOC-in-C, Training Command.

== Honours and decorations ==
During his career, Manavendra Singh has been awarded the Ati Vishisht Seva Medal, Vir Chakra, Vishisht Seva Medal for his service. He was awarded the Param Vishisht Seva Medal in 2022.

Param Vishisht Seva Medal	Ati Vishisht Seva Medal	Vir Chakra Medal	Vishisht Seva Medal

Military offices
Preceded by Rajiv Dayal Mathur	Air Officer Commanding-in-Chief, Training Command; 25 September 2021 – 31 December 2022	Succeeded by Radhakrishnan Radhish
Preceded by Amit Tiwari	Air Officer Commanding-in-Chief, Southern Air Command; 1 February 2021 – 25 September 2021	Succeeded by Jonnalagedda Chalapati
Preceded by Sreekumar Prabhakaran	Director General of Inspection and Flight Safety; 1 November 2019 – 31 January 2021	Succeeded by Gurcharan Singh Bedi
Preceded by Rajeev Sachdeva	Senior Air Staff Officer - Southern Air Command; 14 December 2018 – 31 October 2019	Succeeded by Gurcharan Singh Bedi
