= Sreekumar Prabhakaran =

Air Marshal Sreekumar Prabhakaran AVSM, VM
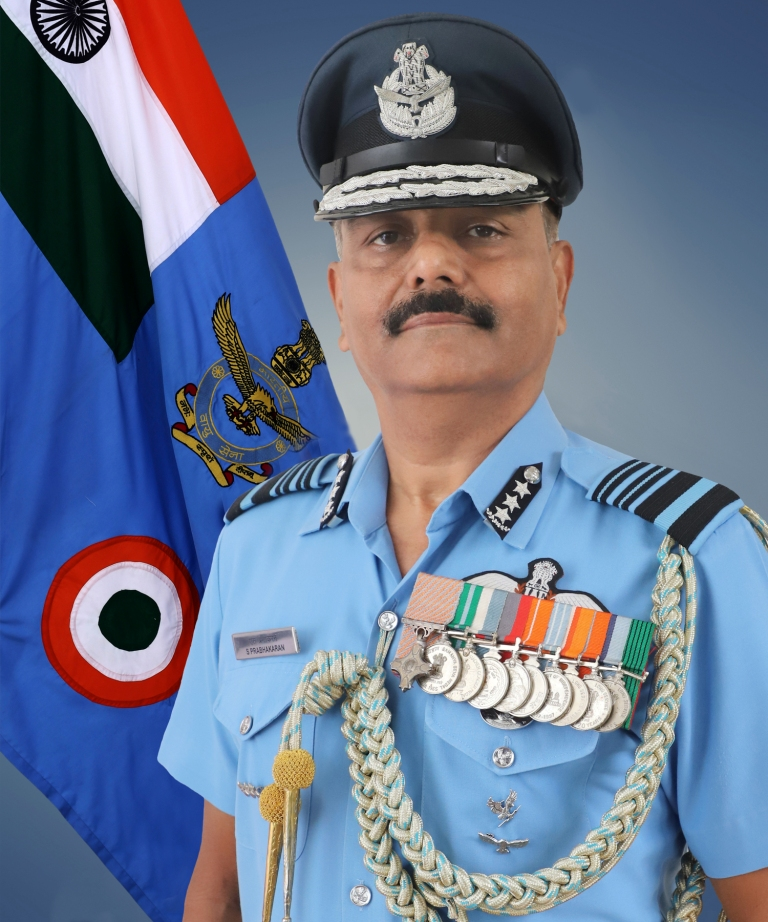
- Born: Kannur, Kerala
- Military career
- Allegiance: India
- Branch: Indian Air Force
- Service years: 22 December 1983 - 31 December 2022
- Rank: Air Marshal
- Service number: 17318
- Unit: No. 45 Squadron
- Commands: Western Air Command; Air Force Academy; Surya Kiran
- Awards: Ati Vishisht Seva Medal; Vayu Sena Medal

Air Marshal Sreekumar Prabhakaran, AVSM, VM is a retired officer of the Indian Air Force. He served as the Air Officer Commanding-in-Chief, Western Air Command. He assumed the office on 1 March 2022 and superannuated on 31 December 2022. Previously, he served as the Commandant of Air Force Academy, Dundigal.

== Early life and education ==
Sreekumar Prabhakaran is a native of Kannur, Kerala. He is a graduate of Defence Services Staff College, Wellington and an alumnus of the prestigious National Defence Academy, Khadagwasla and National Defence College, New Delhi.

== Career ==
Sreekumar Prabhakaran was commissioned as a fighter pilot in the Indian Air Force on 22 December 1983 from Air Force Academy, Dundigal. He has flying experience of over 4,800 hours on a variety of fighter aircraft and has commanded the venerable Surya Kiran display team.

Sreekumar Prabhakaran has commanded the Surya Kiran display team and under him the team has participated in over 150 accident free public display. The team was awarded the Chief of Air Staff's Unit Citation under his command.

With a long career of 37 years. He has served as senior directing staff (Air) at DSSC, Wellington and has commanded two flying bases. He also served as the Defence Attache at Cairo, Egypt from 2007 to 2010.

He served as the Senior Air Staff Officer (SASO) of South Western Air Command. He also served as Director General (Flight Inspection & Safety)

He assumed the charge of Air Officer Commanding-in-Chief, Western Air Command on 1 March 2022 succeeding Air Marshal Amit Dev. He superannuated on 31 December 2022 and was succeeded by Air Marshal Pankaj Mohan Sinha.

== Honours and decorations ==
During his career, Sreekumar Prabhakaran has been awarded the Vayu Sena Medal in 2005 and the Ati Vishisht Seva Medal in 2022 for his services to the nation.

Ati Vishisht Seva Medal	Vayusena Medal

Military offices
Preceded by Amit Dev	Air Officer Commanding-in-Chief, Western Air Command; 1 March 2022 – 31 December 2022	Succeeded by Pankaj Mohan Sinha
Preceded by Sanjeev Kapoor	Commandant – Air Force Academy; 1 November 2021 – 28 February 2022	Succeeded by B Chandra Sekhar
Preceded by Balabhadra Radha Krishna	Senior Air Staff Officer - South Western Air Command; 4 November 2019 – 31 October 2021	Succeeded by Sujeet Pushpakar Dharkar
Preceded by Sardar Harpal Singh	Director General - Inspection and Flight Safety; 1 June 2019 – 31 October 2019	Succeeded by Manavendra Singh
