= Balabhadra Radha Krishna =

Indian Air Force officer

Air Marshal Balabhadra Radha Krishna PVSM, AVSM, SC, ADC
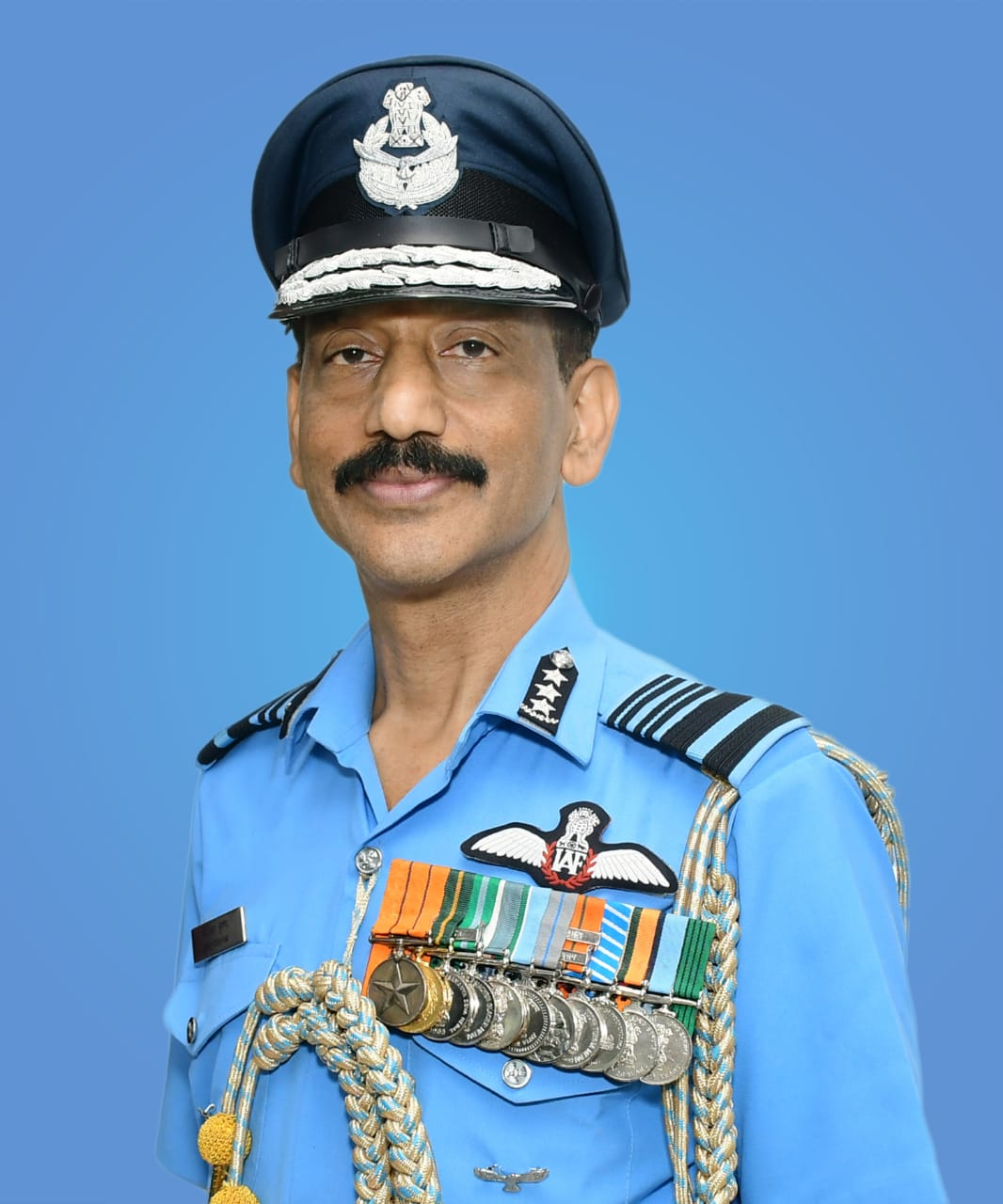
- Official portrait, 2021
- Military career
- Allegiance: India
- Branch: Indian Air Force
- Service years: 22 December 1983 – 31 March 2023
- Rank: Air Marshal
- Service number: 17326
- Unit: No. 37 Squadron
- Commands: Vice Chief of Defence Staff (India); Western Air Command; Director General Air Operations
- Awards: Param Vishisht Seva Medal; Ati Vishisht Seva Medal; Shaurya Chakra

Air Marshal Balabhadra Radha Krishna, PVSM, AVSM, SC, ADC is a retired officer of the Indian Air Force. He served as the Chief of Integrated Defence Staff (the Vice Chief of Defence Staff) from 30 September 2021 till 31 March 2023. He is former Air Officer Commanding-in-Chief (AOC-in-C), Western Air Command. He took over the office on 1 July 2021, following the elevation of Air Marshal Vivek Ram Chaudhari. Previously, he served as the Director General Air Operations and prior to that he served as Senior Air Staff Officer of South Western Air Command.

== Early life and education ==
BR Krishna is an alumnus of National Defence Academy, Defence Services Staff College, Wellington and National Defence College.

== Career ==
BR Krishna was commissioned as a fighter pilot in the Indian Air Force on 22 December 1983. He has flying experience of nearly 5000 hours on a variety of fighter aircraft including operational, instructional and test flying. He is a qualified flying instructor and a test pilot.

With a long career of 38 years, he has commanded a front-line fighter aircraft squadron, and has commanded the Airforce Test Pilot School. He was the Commandant at the Aircraft and Systems Testing Establishment (ASTE). As Air Marshal, he served as the Senior Air Staff Officer of South Western Air Command and prior to his elevation as AOC-in-C, he served as the Director General Air (Operations). As Chief of the IDS, he merged the old Amar Jawan Jyoti at India Gate with the new one at the National War Memorial on 21 January 2022.

== Awards and decorations ==
During his career, BR Krishna for his gallant act in the air, he was awarded Shaurya Chakra in 1986 and for the distinguished service, he was awarded Ati Vishisht Seva Medal in 2017 and the Param Vishisht Seva Medal in 2022.

Param Vishisht Seva Medal		Ati Vishisht Seva Medal	
Shaurya Chakra	Samanya Seva Medal		Siachen Glacier Medal
Operation Parakram Medal	Meritorious Service Medal	Sainya Seva Medal	High Altitude Service Medal
50th Anniversary of Independence Medal	30 Years Long Service Medal	20 Years Long Service Medal	9 Years Long Service Medal

Military offices
Preceded by Atul Kumar Jain	Vice Chief of Defence Staff; 30 September 2021 - 31 March 2023	Succeeded by Johnson P Mathew
Preceded by Vivek Ram Chaudhari	Air Officer Commanding-in-Chief, Western Air Command; 1 July 2021 – 30 September 2021	Succeeded by Amit Dev
Preceded by Amit Dev	Director General Air Operations; 1 November 2019 – 30 June 2021	Succeeded by Pankaj Mohan Sinha
Preceded by Rajiv Dayal Mathur	Senior Air Staff Officer - South Western Air Command; 1 March 2019 – 31 October 2019	Succeeded by Sreekumar Prabhakaran
