= Tarun Chaudhry =

Air Marshal in the Indian Air Force

Air Marshal Tarun Chaudhry AVSM VSM
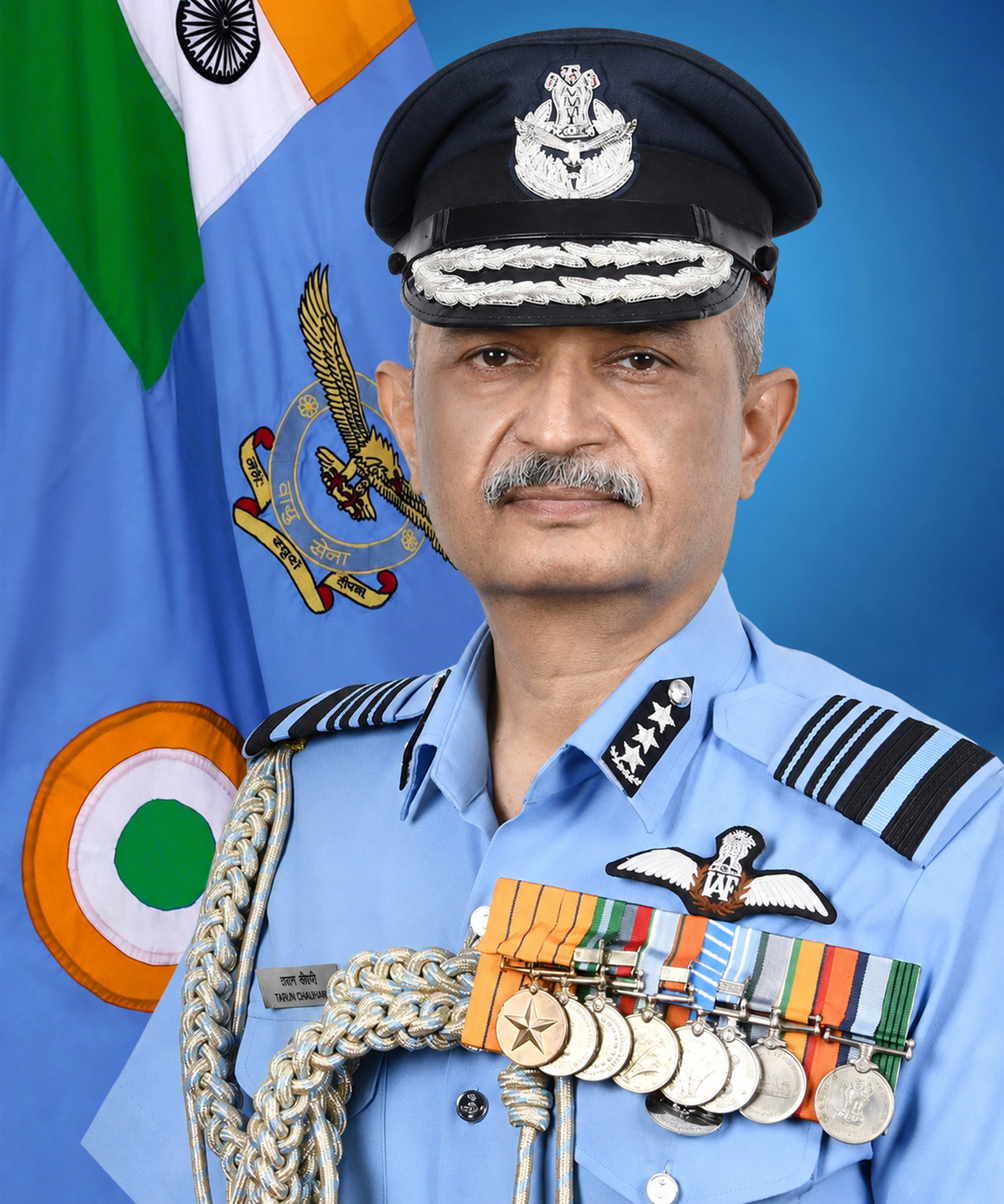
- Official Portrait, 2026

Air Officer Commanding-in-Chief Cenrtal Air Command
- Incumbent
- Assumed office 1 June 2026
- Chief of Air Staff: Amar Preet Singh
- Preceded by: Balakrishnan Manikantan

Military service
- Allegiance: India
- Branch/service: Indian Air Force
- Years of service: 16 December 1989 - Present
- Rank: Air Marshal
- Unit: No. 17 Squadron
- Commands: Central Air Command; 5 Wing; 38 Wing; No. 17 Squadron
- Service Number: 20452
- Awards: Ati Vishisht Seva Medal; Vishisht Seva Medal

Air Marshal Tarun Chaudhry, AVSM, VSM is a serving air officer of the Indian Air Force. He is currently serving as the Air Officer Commanding-in-Chief, Central Air Command. He previously served as the Senior Air Staff Officer, Southern Air Command.

== Early life and education ==
He is an alumnus of the 75th Course of the National Defence Academy, Khadakwasla and the Air Force Academy, Dundigal. He is also an alumnus of College of Air Warfare and National Defence College, New Delhi. He holds an MPhil in Defence and Strategic Studies from Osmania and Madras universities.

== Military career ==
The air officer was commissioned into the fighter stream of the Indian Air Force on 16 December 1989 from the Air Force Academy. In a career spanning over three decades, he has over 4200 hours of flying experience. He has held various command, staff & instructional appointments. The Air Marshal's operational tenures include being the Commanding Officer of No. 17 Squadron (Golden Arrows) and served as Station Commander of No. 38 Wing. As a Group Captain, he served as the Defence Attaché at the Embassy of India, Sweden and as DPO-1(F) at the Air headquarters, New Delhi.

As an Air Commodore, he served as the Air Officer Commanding of No. 5 Wing (Kalaikunda Air Force Station), as Air Cmde (Projects) and later as the Air Cmde (PO-1) at Air headquarters, New Delhi. As an Air Vice Marshal, he served as the Assistant Chief of Air Staff, Projects.

After getting promoted to the rank of Air Marshal on 1 January 2025, he assumed the appointment of Senior Air Staff Officer, Southern Air Command. A year and half later, on 1 June 2026, Air Marshal Chaudhry took over as the Air Officer Commanding-in-Chief, Central Air Command succeeding Air Marshal Balakrishnan Manikantan who superannuated on 31 May 2026.

== Awards and decorations ==
During his career, he has been awarded with the Ati Vishisht Seva Medal in 2026 and the Vishisht Seva Medal in 2012.

| Ati Vishisht Seva Medal | | Vishisht Seva Medal | |
| Samanya Seva Medal | Special Service Medal | | Operation Parakram Medal |
| Sainya Seva Medal | High Altitude Medal | Videsh Seva Medal | 75th Independence Anniversary Medal |
| 50th Independence Anniversary Medal | 30 Years Long Service Medal | 20 Years Long Service Medal | 9 Years Long Service Medal |

== Date of ranks ==
| Insignia | Rank | Component | Date of rank |
|---|---|---|---|
| | Pilot Officer | Indian Air Force | 16 December 1989 |
| | Flying Officer | Indian Air Force | 16 December 1990 |
| | Flight Lieutenant | Indian Air Force | 16 December 1994 |
| | Squadron Leader | Indian Air Force | 16 December 1996 |
| | Wing Commander | Indian Air Force | 16 December 2004 |
| | Group Captain | Indian Air Force | 1 April 2011 |
| | Air Commodore | Indian Air Force | 16 October 2017 |
| | Air Vice Marshal | Indian Air Force | 1 October 2022 |
| | Air Marshal | Indian Air Force | 1 January 2025 (AOC-in-C from 1 June 2026) |

Military offices
| Preceded by Balakrishnan Manikantan | Air Officer Commanding-in-Chief Central Air Command; 2026 - Present | Incumbent |
