= Balakrishnan Manikantan =

Air Officer Commanding-in-Chief, India (Retd.)

Air Marshal Balakrishnan Manikantan PVSM AVSM VM
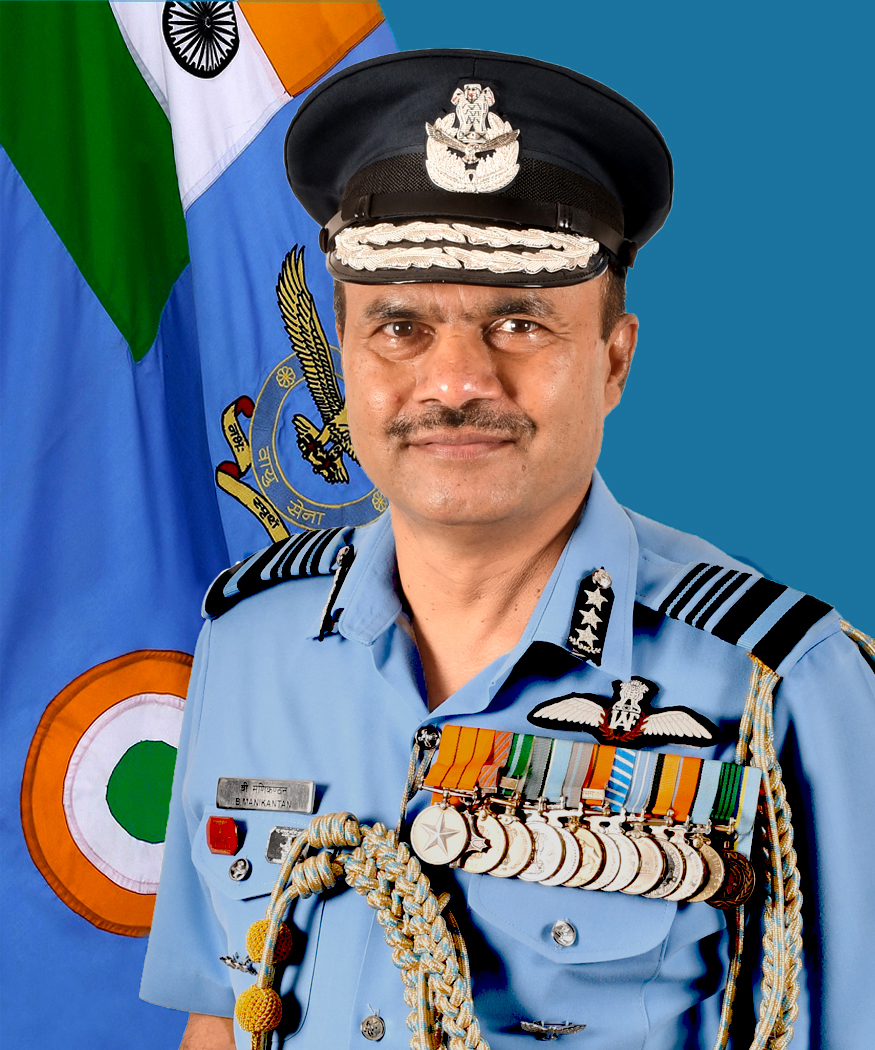

Air Officer Commanding-in-Chief, Central Air Command
- In office 1 May 2025 – 31 May 2026
- Preceded by: Ashutosh Dixit
- Succeeded by: Tarun Chaudhry

Air Officer Commanding-in-Chief, Southern Air Command
- In office 1 May 2023 – 30 April 2025
- Preceded by: Jonnalagedda Chalapati
- Succeeded by: Manish Khanna

Personal details
- Born: Kottayam, Kerala
- Spouse: Group Captain Nirmala Tutakne Manikantan
- Education: Air Force Academy
- Awards: Param Vishisht Seva Medal; Ati Vishisht Seva Medal; Vayu Sena Medal

Military service
- Allegiance: India
- Branch/service: Indian Air Force
- Years of service: 7 June 1986 – 31 May 2026
- Rank: Air Marshal
- Unit: No. 152 Helicopter Unit
- Commands: Central Air Command; Southern Air Command
- Battles/wars: Operation Meghdoot; Operation Pawan
- Service number: 18291

Air Marshal Balakrishnan Manikantan, PVSM, AVSM, VM is a retired officer of the Indian Air Force. He served as the Air Officer Commanding-in-Chief (AOC-in-C), Central Air Command. Previously, he served as the Air Officer Commanding-in-Chief of the Southern Air Command. He assumed the office on 1 May 2023 till 30 April 2025 succeeding Air Marshal Jonnalagedda Chalapati.

== Early life and education ==
Balakrishnan Manikantan, a native Thiruvarppu, a village in Kottayam, Kerala. Born to a teacher couple, Balakrishna Pillai and P K Lakshmi Kutty Amma, Manikantan is an alumnus of Sanik School, Kazhakootam and National Defence Academy, Pune. He holds a Post Graduate degree from Defence Services Staff College, Wellington, Masters in Management Studies (MMS) from College of Defence Management, Secunderabad and M Phil from National Defence College, New Delhi.

== Career ==
Balakrishnan Manikantan was commissioned as the helicopter pilot in the Indian Air Force. In a career spanning over 37 years, he has as more than 5,400 hours of flying experience across various helicopters and fixed wing plane.

He is a Helicopter combat leader and a Cat ‘A’ qualified flying instructor. He served as the commanding officer of No. 152 Helicopter Unit and has taken part in the Indian Air Force contingent at UN Mission in Congo.

As Group Captain, he served as the station commander of Allahabad Airport and later as Air Commodore, he served as the Air Officer Commanding of 21 Wing at AFS Leh in the Western sector. Under his command, the units won trophies for performance at the Command level.

As Air Vice Marshal, he served as the Senior Air & Administration Staff Officer, Maintenance Command at Nagpur. Later, helped in setting up International Defence Cooperation at HQ-IDS and served as the Assistant Chief of Integrated Defence Staff (ACIDS) at Integrated Defence Staff.

He took part in the Operation Pawan, an operation against LTTE by Indian Peace Keeping Force and Operation Meghdoot.

After his promotion to Air Marshal in August 2022, he served as the Senior Air Staff Officer, Eastern Air Command till 30 April 2023.

He took over as the Air Officer Commanding-in-Chief, Southern Air Command on 1 May 2023 from Air Marshal Jonnalagedda Chalapati and served till 30 April 2025.

Later, he was appointed as the Air Officer Commanding-in-Chief, Central Air Command on 1 May 2025.

== Honours and decorations ==
During his career, Balakrishnan Manikantan has received the Commendation card by AOC-in-C, Training Command in 1988 and again by GOC-in-C, Northern Command in 2015. He has been awarded the Param Vishisht Seva Medal in 2025, Ati Vishisht Seva Medal in 2017 and Vayu Sena Medal in 2006 for his service.

Param Vishisht Seva Medal		Ati Vishisht Seva Medal	
Vayu Sena Medal	Samanya Seva Medal		Special Service Medal
Siachen Glacier Medal	Operation Vijay Medal	Operation Parakram Medal	Sainya Seva Medal
High Altitude Medal	Videsh Seva Medal	75th Independence Anniversary Medal	50th Independence Anniversary Medal
30 Years Long Service Medal	20 Years Long Service Medal	9 Years Long Service Medal	MONUSCO

== Personal life ==
A fitness enthusiast and voracious reader, he is married to Group Captain Nirmala Tutakne Manikantan (Retd). The couple has a son Astrith and a daughter Abhishree.

Military offices
Preceded by Ashutosh Dixit	Air Officer Commanding-in-Chief, Central Air Command; 1 May 2025 – 31 May 2026	Succeeded by Tarun Chaudhry
Preceded by Jonnalagedda Chalapati	Air Officer Commanding-in-Chief, Southern Air Command; 1 May 2023 – 30 April 2025	Succeeded by Manish Khanna
Preceded by Amar Preet Singh	Senior Air Staff Officer - Eastern Air Command; 22 August 2022 – 30 April 2023	Succeeded by Tejinder Singh
