= Amit Dev =

Indian retired Air Force air marshal

Air Marshal Amit Dev PVSM, AVSM, VSM, ADC
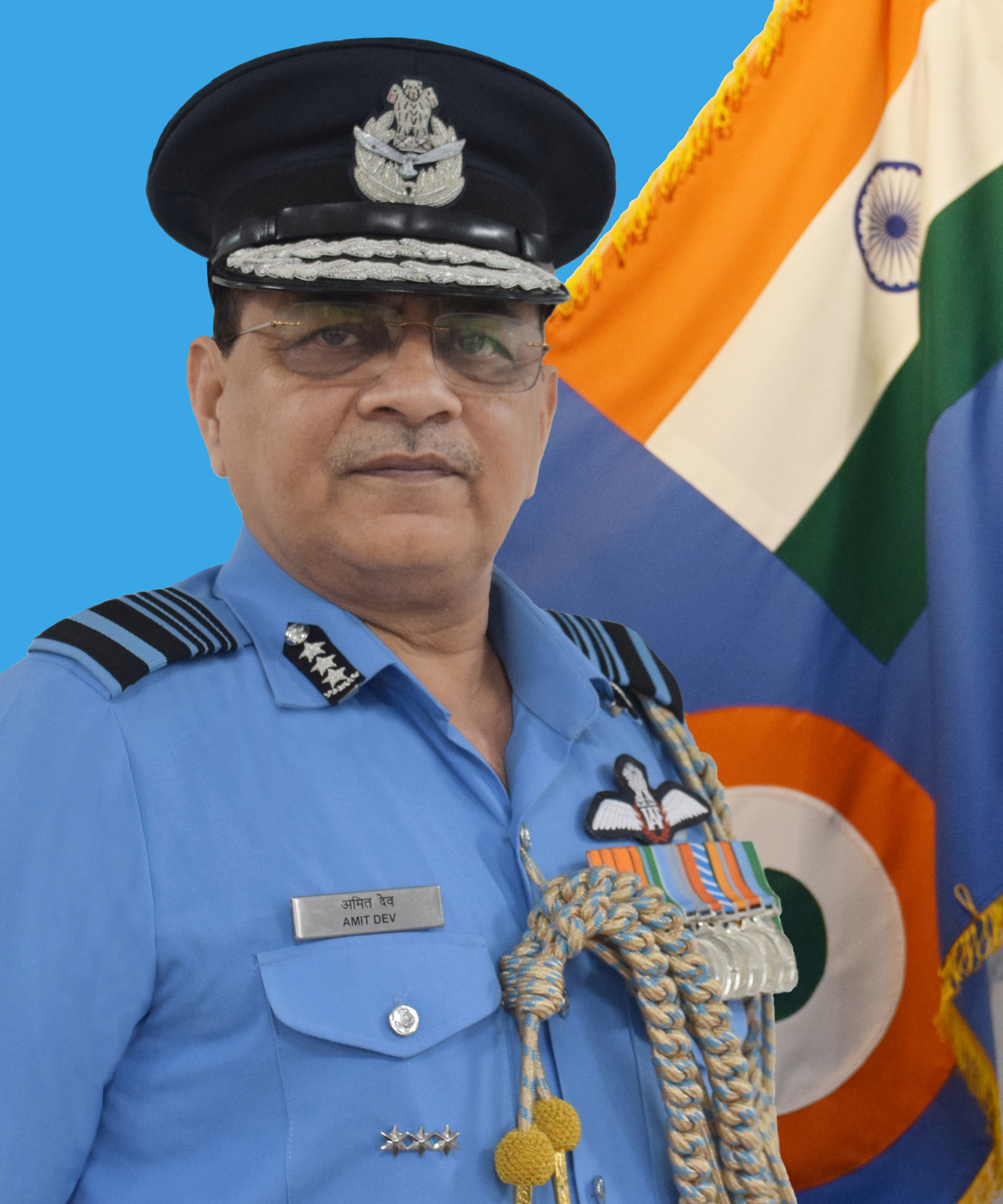
- Military career
- Allegiance: India
- Branch: Indian Air Force
- Service years: 29 December 1982 - 28 February 2022
- Rank: Air Marshal
- Service number: 16972
- Commands: Western Air Command; Eastern Air Command
- Awards: Param Vishisht Seva Medal; Ati Vishisht Seva Medal; Vishisht Seva Medal

Air Marshal Amit Dev, PVSM, AVSM, VSM, ADC is a retired officer of the Indian Air Force. He served as the Air Officer Commanding-in-Chief (AOC-in-C), Western Air Command. He superannuated on 28 February 2022.

== Early life and education ==
Amit Dev did his schooling from St. Michael's High School, Patna. He joined National Defence Academy in 1979. He is an alumnus of the Tactics and Air Combat Development Establishment, Defence Services Staff College, College of Air Warfare and National Defence College. He holds MSc and M Phil degree from Madras University with second M Phil from Osmania University.

== Career ==
Amit Dev was commissioned as a fighter pilot in the Indian Air Force on 29 December 1982. He has flying experience of over 2500 hours on a variety of fighter aircraft including MiG-21 and MiG-27.

With a vast career of 38 years, he has commanded a fighter aircraft squadron, air defense direction centre and an operational fighter base. He has held various post at IAF as Air Headquarter includes Joint Director Tactical Operations, Director Air Staff Inspection, Principal Director Air Staff Inspection, Assistant Chief of Air Staff (Inspection), Director General Air Operations and Air Officer-in-Charge Personnel. He also headed the Air Wing of Strategic Forces Command.

He served as Air Officer in Charge of Personnel from 1 November 2019 to 30 September 2020. He served as Air Officer Commanding in Chief of Eastern Air Command from 1 October 2020 to 30 September 2021.

He superannuated on 28 February 2022 and succeeded by Air Marshal Sreekumar Prabhakaran.

== Honours and decorations ==
During his career, Amit Dev received the Chief of Air Staff commendation card in 1995 and has been awarded the Vishisht Seva Medal (VSM) in 2010, the Ati Vishisht Seva Medal (AVSM) in 2019 and the Param Vishisht Seva Medal in 2022 for his services to the nation.

Param Vishisht Seva Medal	Ati Vishisht Seva Medal	Vishisht Seva Medal

== Personal life ==
Air Marshal Amit Dev is married to Mrs Seema Dev and they have two sons.

== Gallery ==
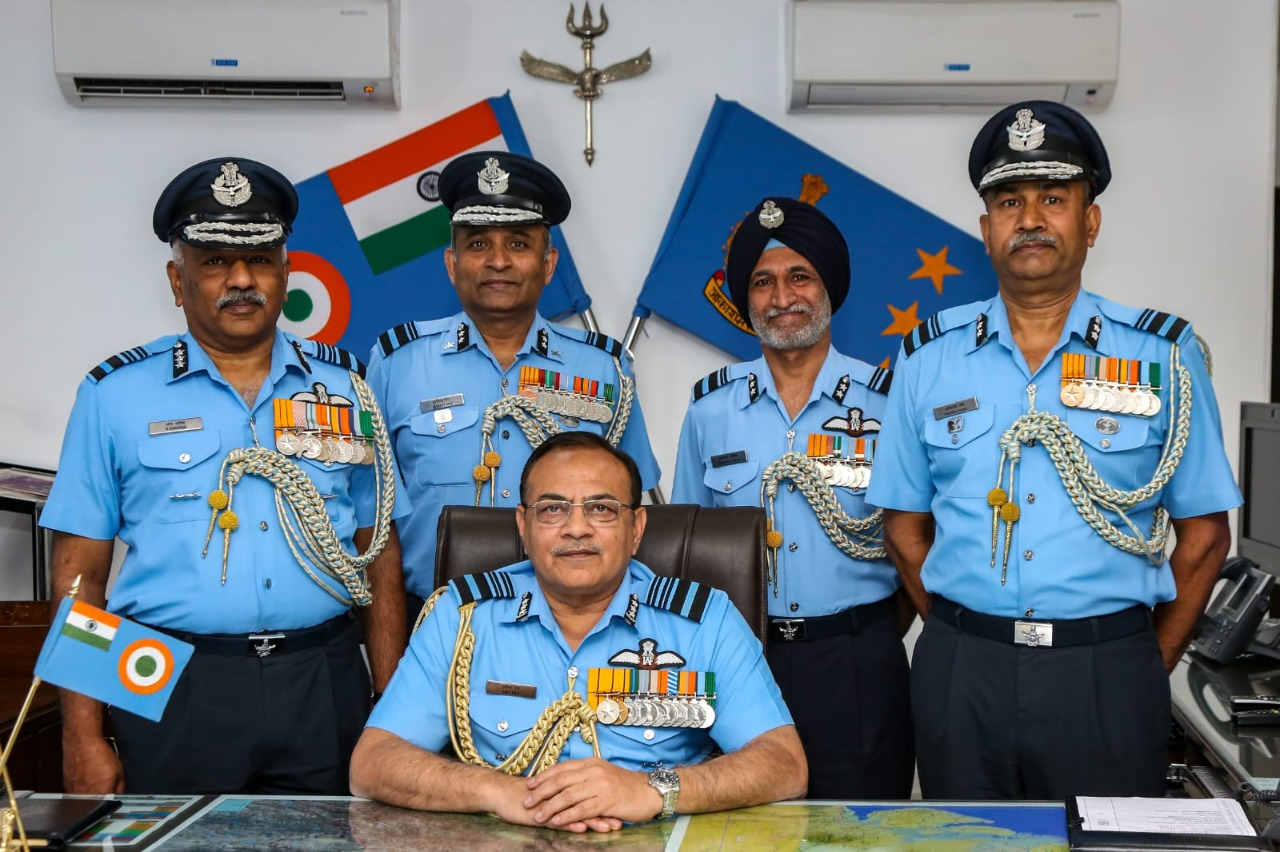
Amit Dev superannuated on 28 Feb 22.

Military offices
Preceded by Balabhadra Radha Krishna	Air Officer Commanding-in-Chief, Western Air Command; 1 October 2021 – 28 February 2022	Succeeded by Sreekumar Prabhakaran
Preceded by Rajiv Dayal Mathur	Air Officer Commanding-in-Chief, Eastern Air Command; 1 October 2020 – 30 September 2021	Succeeded by Dilip Kumar Patnaik
Preceded by Amit Tiwari	Air Officer-in-Charge Personnel; 1 November 2019 – 30 September 2020	Succeeded by Richard John Duckworth
Preceded by Harjit Singh Arora	Director General Air Operations; 2018 - 2018	Succeeded by Balabhadra Radha Krishna
