= Manish Khanna (air marshal) =

Former Indian Air Force air marshal

Air Marshal Manish Khanna UYSM AVSM VM
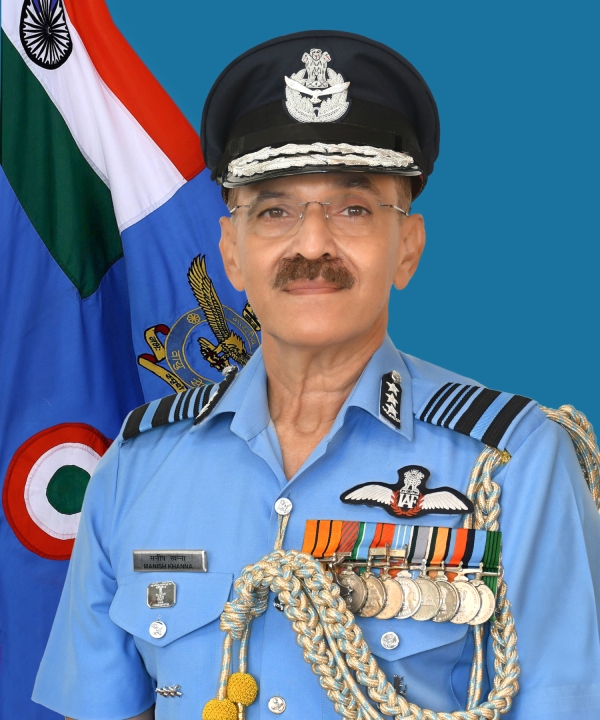

Air Officer Commanding-in-Chief Southern Air Command
- In office 1 June 2025 – 30 June 2026
- Chief of Air Staff: Amar Preet Singh
- Preceded by: Balakrishnan Manikantan
- Succeeded by: Jasvir Singh Mann

Military service
- Allegiance: India
- Branch/service: Indian Air Force
- Years of service: 6 December 1986 – 30 June 2026
- Rank: Air Marshal
- Unit: No. 35 Squadron
- Commands: Southern Air Command; College of Air Warfare; Advance HQ, WAC; AFS Bidar; Aircrew Examination Board; No. 35 Squadron
- Service number: 18554
- Awards: Uttam Yudh Seva Medal; Ati Vishisht Seva Medal; Vayu Sena Medal

Air Marshal Manish Khanna, UYSM, AVSM, VM is a retired officer of the Indian Air Force. He last served as the Air Officer Commanding-in-Chief, Southern Air Command. He was previously serving as the Senior Air Staff Officer, South Western Air Command.

== Early life and education ==
The Air officer is an alumnus of the National Defence Academy, Khadakwasla and the Air Force Academy, Dundigal. He is also an alumnus of Defence Services Staff College, Wellington, National Defence College, New Delhi and College of Air Warfare, Secunderabad. He also holds a PhD degree in Defence and Strategic Studies.

== Career ==
He was commissioned into the fighter stream of the Indian Air Force on 6 December 1986 from the Air Force Academy. In a career spanning over 37 years, he has more than 4,000 hours of flying experience across various fighter jets and trainers and has held numerous training and staff appointments. He is a highly experienced fighter pilot and has flown various aircraft of the Indian Air Force which includes Mirage 2000, MiG-21 (BIS/T-96), MiG-25, F-5 A/B fighters and Hawk MK-132, Kiran Mk I/II trainers. He is a Category A qualified flying instructor and has rich operational experience in Air Defence, Ground Attack, Strategic Reconnaissance and Electronic Warfare. The Air Marshal's operational tenures include being the Commanding Officer of No. 35 Squadron. As a Group Captain, he served as the Commanding Officer of the Aircrew Examination Board.

As an Air Commodore, he served as the Air Officer Commanding, Air Force Station Bidar, as the Principal Director (Intelligence) and Principal Director Personnel Officer (PDPO) and later as the Air Commodore (Air Defence Ops, Weapon System) at the Air Headquarters, New Delhi.

As an Air Vice Marshal, he served as the Air Officer Commanding, Advance HQ, Western Air Command, as the Assistant Chief of Air Staff, Personnel Officers at the Air Headquarters, New Delhi. On 5 September 2022, he took over as the commandant of the College of Air Warfare,Secunderabad.

After being promoted to the rank of Air Marshal on 3 July 2023, he assumed the appointment of Senior Air Staff Officer, South Western Air Command at Gandhinagar. On 1 June 2025, Air Marshal Manish Khanna took over as Air Officer Commanding-in-Chief, Southern Air Command succeeding Air Marshal Balakrishnan Manikantan who moved to Central Air Command as Air Commander.

== Awards and decorations ==
During his career, the air marshal has been awarded the Uttam Yudh Seva Medal on Independence Day 2025, the Ati Vishisht Seva Medal in 2016 and the Vayu Sena Medal in 2010.

Uttam Yudh Seva Medal	Ati Vishisht Seva Medal		Vayu Sena Medal
Operation Parakram Medal	Sainya Seva Medal	Videsh Seva Medal	75th Anniversary of Independence Medal
50th Independence Anniversary Medal	30 Years Long Service Medal	20 Years Long Service Medal	9 Years Long Service Medal

== Dates of ranks ==
Insignia	Rank	Component	Date of rank
	Pilot Officer	Indian Air Force	6 December 1986
	Flying Officer	Indian Air Force	6 December 1987
	Flight Lieutenant	Indian Air Force	6 December 1991
	Squadron Leader	Indian Air Force	6 December 1997
	Wing Commander	Indian Air Force	5 May 2003
	Group Captain	Indian Air Force	1 February 2009
	Air Commodore	Indian Air Force	17 June 2013
	Air Vice Marshal	Indian Air Force	11 June 2019
	Air Marshal	Indian Air Force	3 July 2023 (AOC-in-C from 1 June 2025)

Military offices
Preceded by Balakrishnan Manikantan	Air Officer Commanding-in-Chief; Southern Air Command; 1 June 2025 – 30 June 2026	Succeeded by Jasvir Singh Mann
Preceded by Ashutosh Dixit	Senior Air Staff Officer; South Western Air Command; 3 July 2023 – 31 May 2025	Succeeded by Seethepalli Shrinivas
