= Navkaranjit Singh Dhillon =

Indian general

Air Marshal N J S Dhillon PVSM, AVSM
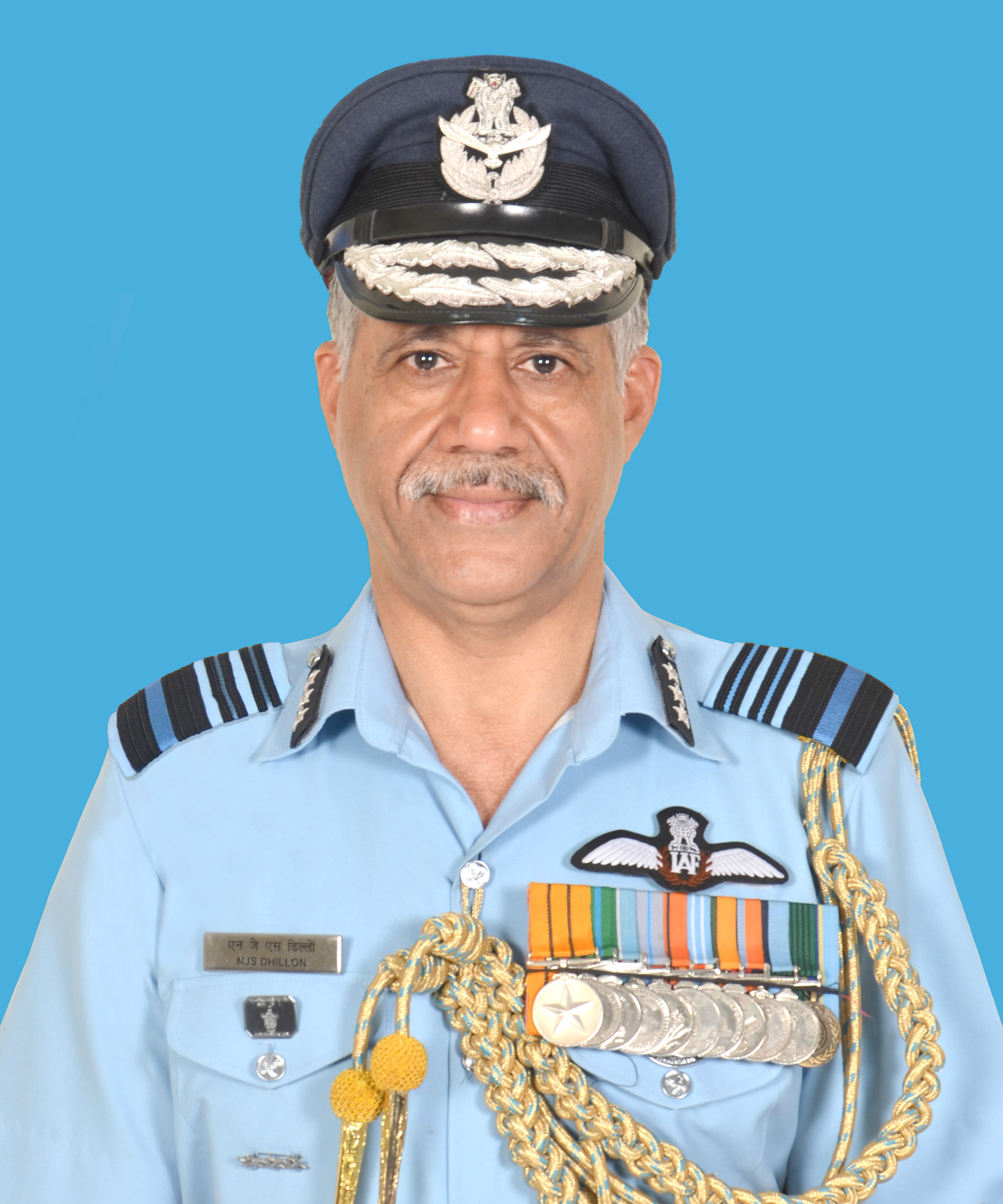
- Born: 2 January 1961 (age 65)
- Military career
- Allegiance: India
- Branch: Indian Air Force
- Service years: 1981 – 31 January 2021
- Rank: Air Marshal
- Service number: 16580
- Commands: Strategic Forces Command
- Awards: Param Vishisht Seva Medal; Ati Vishisht Seva Medal

Air Marshal Navkaranjit Singh Dhillon, AVSM is a former air officer of the Indian Air Force. He last served as the Commander-in-Chief, Strategic Forces Command. He assumed office on 1 April 2019, following the retirement of Air Marshal Jasbir Walia. He superannuated on 31 January 2021.

== Early life and education ==
Dhillon is an alumnus of St. Francis School, Amritsar, Sainik School, Kapurthala and Khalsa College, Amritsar. He is a graduate of the National Defence Academy, Khadakwasla, Defence Services Staff College, Wellington and the National Defence College, New Delhi.

== Career ==
Dhillon has served as Principal Director Air Defence at Air Headquarters (Vayu Bhawan), as well as Assistant Chief of Air Staff (Inspection) at Air Headquarters. Prior to assuming the appointment of Commander-in-Chief, Strategic Forces Command, he was Air Defence Commander at Headquarters, Southern Air Command and Senior Air Staff Officer at Headquarters, Western Air Command.

== Honours and decorations ==
In his career of 38 years, Dhillon has been awarded Ati Vishisht Seva Medal in 2014 and the Param Vishisht Seva Medal in 2021 for his service.

Param Vishisht Seva Medal	Ati Vishisht Seva Medal

== Personal life ==
He is married to Simmar Dhillon and they have a son Pavit Dhillon and a Daughter Puneet Dhillon.

Military offices
Preceded by Jasbir Walia	Commander-in-Chief, Strategic Forces Command; 1 April 2019 – 31 January 2021	Succeeded by Rajesh Kumar
Preceded by Balakrishnan Suresh	Senior Air Staff Officer - Western Air Command; 1 August 2016 – 31 March 2019	Succeeded by Diptendu Choudhury
