= Jasvir Singh Mann =

Indian Air Force Air marshal

Air Marshal Jasvir Singh Mann AVSM VM
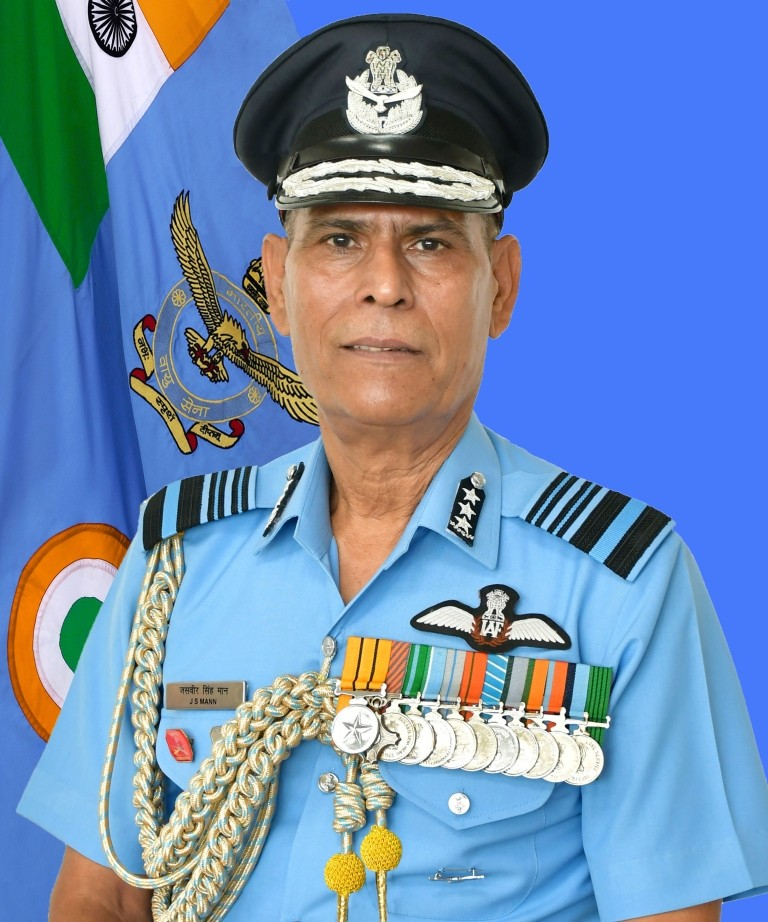
- Official Portrait, 2026

Air Officer Commanding-in-Chief Southern Air Command
- Incumbent
- Assumed office 1 July 2026
- Chief of Air Staff: Amar Preet Singh
- Preceded by: Manish Khanna

Military service
- Allegiance: India
- Branch/service: Indian Air Force
- Years of service: 16 December 1989 - Present
- Rank: Air Marshal
- Unit: No. 15 Squadron
- Commands: Southern Air Command; 16 Wing; No. 15 Squadron
- Service Number: 20491
- Awards: Ati Vishisht Seva Medal; Vayu Sena Medal

Air Marshal Jasvir Singh Mann, AVSM, VM is a serving air officer of the Indian Air Force. He is currently serving as the Air Officer Commanding-in-Chief, Southern Air Command. He previously served as the Senior Air Staff Officer, Western Air Command.

== Early life and education ==
He is an alumnus of the 75th Course of the National Defence Academy, Khadakwasla and the 144 Course of the Air Force Academy, Dundigal. He is also an alumnus of Defence Services Staff College, Wellington and Royal College of Defence Studies, London.

== Military career ==
The air officer was commissioned into the fighter stream of the Indian Air Force on 16 December 1989 from the Air Force Academy. In a career spanning over three decades, he has over 3000 hours of flying experience and has held various command and staff appointments. He is a highly experienced fighter pilot and a Pilot attack instructor who has flown aircraft like Apache, MiG-21, Jaguar, Mig-29, Su-30 and Rafale. The Air Marshal's operational tenures include being the Commanding Officer of No. 15 Squadron (Flying Lances). As a Group Captain, he served as Chief Operations Officer of No. 1 Wing at Srinagar. He has directed Joint Military Training exercises with Republic of Singapore Air Force in 2017 and with the United States Air Force in 2018.

As an Air Commodore, he served as the Air Officer Commanding of 16 Wing (Hasimara Air Force Station). As an Air Vice Marshal, he served as the Air Defence Commander & Senior Officer-in-Charge Administration at Central Air Command and later as the Assistant Chief of Air Staff, Ops Offensive at Air headquarters, New Delhi.

On promotion to the rank of Air marshal, he assumed the appointment of Director General of Weapon Systems. After a short stint, he was appointed as Senior Air Staff Officer, Western Air Command. On 1 July 2026, Air Marshal Mann took over as the Air Officer Commanding-in-Chief, Southern Air Command at Thiruvananthapuram succeeding Air Marshal Manish Khanna when the latter supperannuated on 30 June 2026.

== Awards and decorations ==
During his career, he has been awarded with the Ati Vishisht Seva Medal in 2024 and the Vayu Sena Medal in 2009.

Ati Vishisht Seva Medal	Vayu Sena Medal	Samanya Seva Medal	Operation Vijay Medal
Operation Parakram Medal	Sainya Seva Medal	High Altitude Medal	75th Independence Anniversary Medal
50th Independence Anniversary Medal	30 Years Long Service Medal	20 Years Long Service Medal	9 Years Long Service Medal

== Date of ranks ==
Insignia	Rank	Component	Date of rank
	Pilot Officer	Indian Air Force	16 December 1989
	Flying Officer	Indian Air Force	16 December 1990
	Flight Lieutenant	Indian Air Force	16 December 1994
	Squadron Leader	Indian Air Force	16 December 1996
	Wing Commander	Indian Air Force	16 December 2004
	Group Captain	Indian Air Force	1 May 2011
	Air Commodore	Indian Air Force	26 December 2017
	Air Vice Marshal	Indian Air Force	1 January 2023
	Air Marshal	Indian Air Force	21 Mar 2025 (AOC-in-C from 1 July 2026)

Military offices
Preceded by Manish Khanna	Air Officer Commanding-in-Chief Southern Air Command; 1 July 2026 - Present	Incumbent
Preceded by Praveen Keshav Vohra	Senior Air Staff Officer; Western Air Command; 1 June 2025 – 30 June 2026	Succeeded by Ashish Singh
