= Richard John Duckworth =

Indian Air Force Officer

Air Marshal Richard John Duckworth AVSM, VSM
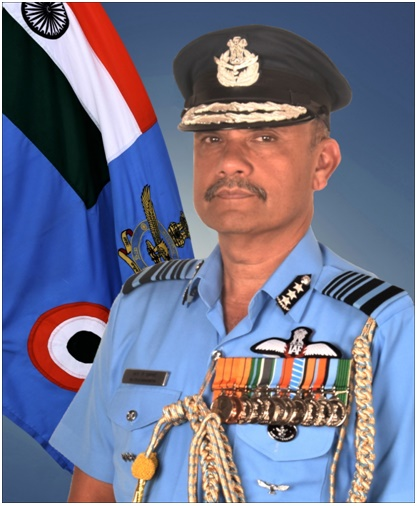
- Military career
- Allegiance: India
- Branch: Indian Air Force
- Service years: 28 May 1983 - 30 June 2022
- Rank: Air Marshal
- Service number: 17136
- Unit: No. 23 Squadron
- Commands: Central Air Command; Air Officer-in-Charge Personnel
- Awards: Ati Vishisht Seva Medal; Vishisht Seva Medal

Air Marshal Richard John Duckworth, AVSM, VSM is a retired officer of the Indian Air Force. He served as the Air Officer Commanding-in-Chief (AOC-in-C), Central Air Command. He assumed the office on 1 July 2021 succeeding Air Marshal Amit Tiwari. Previously he served as Air Officer in charge Personnel at Air Headquarters Vayu Bhawan in New Delhi and Senior Air Staff Officer for the Western Air Command and Central Air Command.

== Career ==
Richard John Duckworth was commissioned as a fighter pilot in the Indian Air Force on 29 May 1983. In a distinguished career spanning 38 years, he has flown a variety of fighter and trainer aircraft with more than 3000 hours of operational flying.

With a long career of 38 years, he has commanded a front line fighter aircraft squadron and a fighter base. As an Air Vice Marshal, he served as the Assistant Chief of Integrated Defence Staff (Technical Intelligence). He is an alumnus of Defence Services Staff College, Wellington.

He is a Qualified Flying Instructor and has flown MiG-21 and MiG-29 fighter aircraft and has commanded a Mig-21 squadron on a front line base.

He superannuated on 30 June 2022 and was succeeded by Air Marshal Amar Preet Singh.

== Honours and decorations ==
During his career, Richard John Duckworth was awarded the Vishisht Seva Medal (VSM) in 2008 and Ati Vishisht Seva Medal in 2021.

| Ati Vishisht Seva Medal | Vishisht Seva Medal |

Military offices
| Preceded by Amit Tiwari | Air Officer Commanding-in-Chief, Central Air Command; 1 July 2021 - 30 June 2022 | Succeeded by Amar Preet Singh |
| Preceded by Amit Dev | Air Officer-in-Charge Personnel; 1 October 2020 - 30 June 2021 | Succeeded by Suraj Kumar Jha |
| Preceded by Diptendu Choudhury | Senior Air Staff Officer - Western Air Command; 16 Dec 2019 - 30 Sep 2020 | Succeeded by Vikram Singh |
| Preceded by Devendra Singh Rawat | Senior Air Staff Officer - Central Air Command; 1 May 2019 - 15 Dec 2019 | Succeeded by Vipin Indira Panabhan Nayar |
