= Commander-in-Chief, Strategic Forces Command =

Indian military appointment

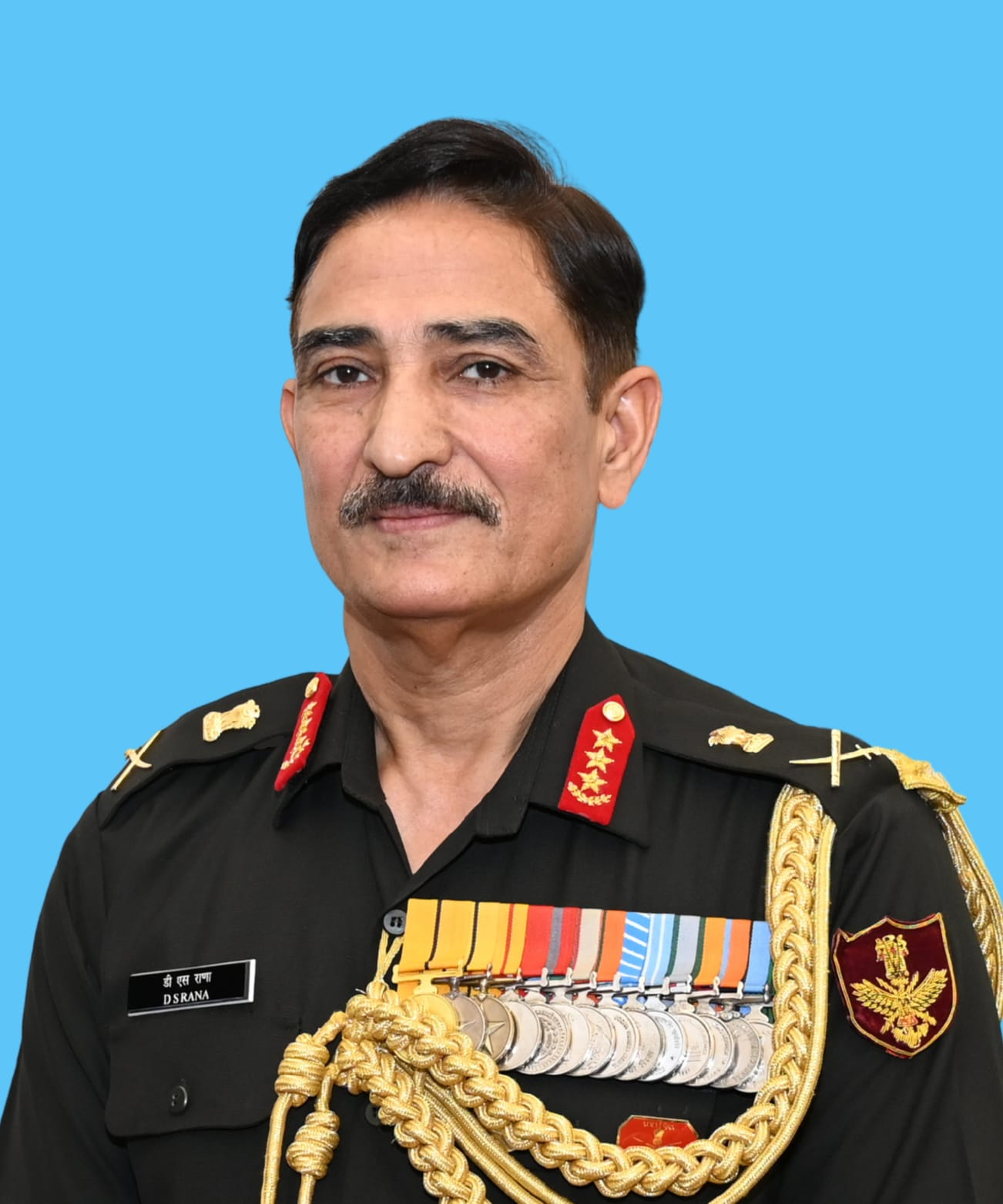
- Incumbent; Lieutenant General Dinesh Singh Rana; PVSM AVSM YSM SM since 1 October 2025
- Reports to: Chief of the Defence Staff
- Seat: New Delhi
- Appointer: Appointments Committee of the Cabinet
- Formation: 2003
- First holder: Air Marshal Tej Mohan Asthana; PVSM AVSM VM

The Commander-in-Chief, Strategic Forces Command is the head of the Strategic Forces Command, the integrated tri-service command responsible for the management and administration of India's tactical and strategic nuclear weapons stockpile.

The current Commander-in-Chief is Lieutenant General Dinesh Singh Rana who took command on 1 October 2025 as the 14th CinC, SFC.

== History ==
The Strategic Forces Command (SFC) was created on 4 January 2003 by the Government of India under Prime Minister Atal Bihari Vajpayee. Part of the Nuclear Command Authority, the SFC manages and administers all strategic forces by exercising complete command and control over nuclear assets.

The Cabinet Committee on Security approved the appointment of a Commander-in-Chief, Strategic Forces Command, to manage and administer all Strategic Forces. Air Marshal Teja Mohan Asthana was appointed the first commander-in-chief on 10 January 2013.

== Organisation ==
The CinC SFC is a Three-star rank officer from the three Services in rotation. The CinC reports directly to the Chief of Defence Staff (India) (CDS). He is assisted by the Deputy Commander-in-Chief of the command, also a three-star officer.

== List of commanders ==
List of Commanders-in-Chief of Strategic Forces Command
S.No	Name	Branch	Assumed office	Left office	Notes
1	Air Marshal Tej Mohan Asthana PVSM, AVSM, VM	Indian Air Force	10 January 2003	30 June 2004	First C-in-C.
2	Air Marshal Ajit Bhavnani PVSM, AVSM, VM	Indian Air Force	12 July 2004	18 August 2005	Later served as Vice Chief of the Air Staff.
3	Air Marshal Avinash Deodata Joshi PVSM, VM	Indian Air Force	22 August 2005	31 December 2006	
4	Vice Admiral Vijay Shankar PVSM, AVSM	Indian Navy	December 2006	30 September 2008	Later served as Commander-in-Chief, Andaman and Nicobar Command.
5	Lieutenant General Balraj Singh Nagal PVSM, AVSM, SM	Indian Army	30 September 2008	December 2010	
6	Air Marshal K. J. Mathews PVSM, AVSM, YSM	Indian Air Force	1 January 2011	31 October 2012	
7	Vice Admiral S. P. S. Cheema PVSM, AVSM, NM	Indian Navy	1 November 2012	June 2014	Later served as Flag Officer Commanding-in-Chief Southern Naval Command and as Flag Officer Commanding-in-Chief Western Naval Command.
8	Lieutenant General Amit Sharma PVSM, AVSM, VSM	Indian Army	13 June 2014	31 July 2016	
9	Air Marshal Jasbir Walia PVSM, VM, VSM	Indian Air Force	1 August 2016	30 March 2019	
10	Air Marshal Navkaranjit Singh Dhillon PVSM, AVSM	Indian Air Force	30 March 2019	31 January 2021	
11	Air Marshal Rajesh Kumar PVSM, AVSM, VM	Indian Air Force	31 January 2021	31 August 2021	
12	Vice Admiral R. B. Pandit PVSM, AVSM	Indian Navy	31 August 2021	30 September 2023	
13	Vice Admiral Suraj Berry PVSM, AVSM, NM, VSM	Indian Navy	6 October 2023	30 September 2025	
14	Lt Gen Dinesh Singh Rana PVSM, AVSM, YSM, SM	Indian Army	1 October 2025	Incumbent	

List of CinC by branches of service
Branch	Count
Indian Army	3
Indian Navy	4
Indian Air Force	7

== See also ==
- Commander-in-Chief, Andaman and Nicobar Command
- Chief of Integrated Defence Staff
