= Lucknow Air Force Station =

- IATA: none; ICAO: VIBL

Summary
- Airport type: Military
- Owner: Indian Air Force
- Operator: Central Air Command
- Location: Bakshi Ka Talab, Lucknow, Uttar Pradesh
- Elevation AMSL: 417 ft / 127 m
- Coordinates: 26°59′19″N 080°53′29″E
- Interactive map of Lucknow Air Force Station

Runways
Direction	Length		Surface
Direction	ft	m	Surface
	10,300	3,139

Lucknow Air Force Station, also known as Bakshi Ka Talab Air Force Station, is located at Bakshi Ka Talab on the outskirts of Lucknow, Uttar Pradesh, India. It comes under the Central Air Command of the Indian Air Force. The No. 35 Squadron IAF (Rapiers), an electronic warfare and air superiority unit, was based at the station till March 2019.

The airstrip was established during the Second World War, and was expanded later. It is used for air traffic control and emergency landings.
