= Jonnalagedda Chalapati =

Air Officer Commanding-in-Chief, India

Air Marshal Jonnalagedda Chalapati PVSM AVSM VSM ADC
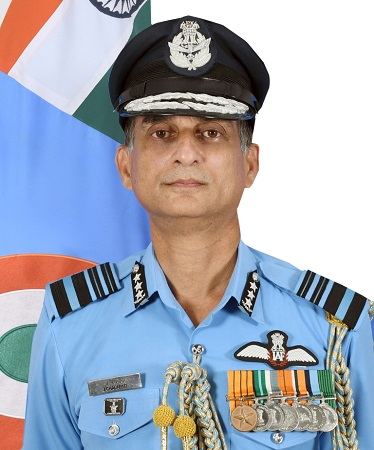
- Born: Andhra Pradesh, India
- Military career
- Allegiance: India
- Branch: Indian Air Force
- Years of service: 1983–2023
- Rank: Air Marshal
- Service number: 17358
- Commands: Southern Air Command; Air Force Academy; AFS Bagdogra
- Awards: Param Vishisht Seva Medal; Ati Vishisht Seva Medal; Vishisht Seva Medal

Air Marshal Jonnalagedda Chalapati, PVSM, AVSM, VSM, ADC is a retired officer of the Indian Air Force. He served as the Air Officer Commanding-in-Chief (AOC-in-C), Southern Air Command. He assumed the office on October 3, 2021, succeeding Air Marshal Manavendra Singh.

== Early life and education ==
Jonnalagedda Chalapati graduated from the Hyderabad Public School in 1980. He is an alumnus of National Defence Academy, Khadagwasla and Air Force Academy, Hyderabad. He has completed his National Defence Course from Bangladesh and master's degree in Military Studies from King's College London.

== Career ==
Jonnalagedda Chalapati was commissioned as a fighter pilot in the Indian Air Force on December 22, 1983. He has flying experience on various aircraft including HAL Tejas.

Chalapati is a Qualified Flying Instructor and an Experimental Test Pilot and has about 3311 hrs of operational flight experience. He had served as a test pilot at Hindustan Aeronautics Limited working with DRDO on various projects. He has held various appointments including Command of an Operational Squadron, commanded the AFS Bagdogra. He served as the Project Director (Flight Test) at National Flight Test Center, Aeronautical Development Agency. He was the Commandant at Air Force Academy, Dundigal.

In August 2020, he served as the Senior Air Staff Officer for the Southern Air Command.

He superannuated on March 31, 2023 and was succeeded by Air Marshal Balakrishnan Manikantan as AOC-in-C, Southern Air Command.

== Awards and decorations ==
During his career, Jonnalagedda Chalapati has been awarded the Param Vishisht Seva Medal in 2024, Ati Vishisht Seva Medal in 2022, Vishisht Seva Medal in 2012 for his service.

Param Vishisht Seva Medal	Ati Vishisht Seva Medal	Vishisht Seva Medal	
Samanya Seva Medal	Siachen Glacier Medal	Sainya Seva Medal	75th Independence Anniversary Medal
50th Independence Anniversary Medal	30 Years Long Service Medal	20 Years Long Service Medal	9 Years Long Service Medal

== Personal life ==
Jonnalagedda Chalapati is married to Smitha Gayatri Jonnalagedda who was previously the President of Air Force Wives Welfare Association (Regional). The couple is blessed with 2 children.

Military offices
Preceded by Manavendra Singh	Air Officer Commanding-in-Chief, Southern Air Command; 3 October 2021 – 31 March 2023	Succeeded by Balakrishnan Manikantan
Preceded by Gurcharan Singh Bedi	Senior Air Staff Officer – Southern Air Command; 1 August 2020 – 2 October 2021	Succeeded by Surendra Kumar Indoria
Preceded by Arvindra Singh Butola	Commandant – Air Force Academy; 14 October 2019 – 31 July 2020	Succeeded by Vipin Indira Panabhan Nayar
