= Dilip Kumar Patnaik =

Air Officer Commanding-in-Chief, India

Air Marshal Dilip Kumar Patnaik AVSM, VM
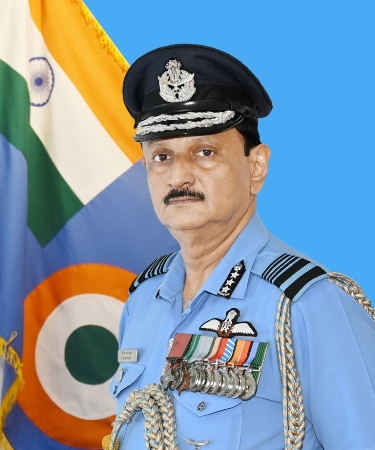

Personal details
- Spouse: Anuradha Patnaik
- Awards: AVSM, VM

Military service
- Allegiance: India
- Branch/service: Indian Air Force
- Years of service: 8 June 1984 - 30 September 2022
- Rank: Air Marshal
- Commands: Eastern Air Command
- Battles/wars: Kargil War
- Service number: 17464

Air Marshal Dilip Kumar Patnaik, AVSM, VM is a retired officer in the Indian Air Force. He served as the Air Officer Commanding-in-Chief (AOC-in-C), Eastern Air Command. He took over the office on 3 October 2021, succeeding of Air Marshal Amit Dev and superannuated on 30 September 2022. He was succeeded by Air Marshal Sujeet Pushpakar Dharkar.

== Early life and education ==
He is an alumnus of National Defence Academy Khadakwasla and Defence Services Staff College, Tamil Nadu and has done the Higher Air Command Course.

== Career ==
Dilip Kumar Patnaik was commissioned as a fighter pilot in the Indian Air Force on 8 June 1984. He has flying experience of 2500 hours various aircraft including Mig-21 and Mirage 2000.

Patnaik has served as a mission commander for Remotely Piloted Aircraft Unit and has 800 hours experience as on Searcher MK-II & Heron unmanned aircraft.

He has held various appointments including commander of an Air Defence Station, Commandant of Electronic Warfare Range and as a commander of a front-line fighter base. He had served as the Principal Director (Information & Electronic Warfare) at Air HQ, Assistant Chief of Air Staff Operations (Air Defence), Commandant of the prestigious College of Air Warfare, Telangana.

Previous to his present assignment, he had served as Senior Air Staff Officer for the Central Air Command from 1 August 2020 to 2 October 2021.

Patnaik has conducted many live bombing missions during Kargil conflict.

== Honours and decorations ==
During his career, Dilip Kumar Patnaik has been awarded the Vayu Sena Medal (Gallantry) for his contribution in Kargil War and Ati Vishisht Seva Medal in 2020.

Ati Vishisht Seva Medal	Vayu Sena Medal

== Personal life ==
Dilip Kumar Patnaik is married to Mrs Anuradha Patnaik who was the regional President of the Air Force Wives Welfare Association.

== Political career ==
Patnaik along with former IAS topper Hrusikesh Panda and former Joint Secretary of Rajya Sabha Ramakanta Das joined the Bharatiya Janata Party in Odisha ahead of 2024 Indian general election as well as 2024 Odisha Legislative Assembly election.

Military offices
Preceded by Amit Dev	Air Officer Commanding-in-Chief, Eastern Air Command; 3 October 2021 – 30 September 2022	Succeeded by Sujeet Pushpakar Dharkar
Preceded by Vipin Indira Panabhan Nayar	Senior Air Staff Officer - Central Air Command; 1 August 2020 – 2 October 2021	Succeeded by Ravi Gopal Krishana Kapoor
