= Commandant of the National Defence College =

Commandant of Indian defence college

- Incumbent; Air Marshal Manish Kumar Gupta AVSM
- Type: Military
- Status: Active
- Formation: July 1959
- First holder: Lieutenant General Kanwar Bahadur Singh, MBE
- Website: https://ndc.nic.in/

The Commandant of the National Defence College in India is the overall in-charge of all the functioning of the National Defence College including academics and administration. The Commandant of the college is a Three-star rank officer from the three Services in rotation for a term of two years.

== History ==
In July 1959, Lieutenant General Kanwar Bahadur Singh was appointed the first Commandant of the college. By the end of the year, he formulated detailed plans including the aim and the charter of NDC as well as the scope of studies at the college. The Chiefs of Staff cleared approved them on 25 December 1959.

== Organisation ==
The Commandant is supported by seven Senior Directing Staff (3 from the Indian Army and 1 each from the Indian Navy, Indian Air Force, Civil Service and the Foreign Service). Administration is looked after by the Secretary under the Commandant and is supported by a number of Staff Officers.

== List of Commandants ==
S.No	Name	Branch	Assumed office	Left office	Notes
1	Lieutenant General Kanwar Bahadur Singh MBE	Indian Army	July 1959	January 1964	First Commandant of NDC
2	Vice Admiral A K Chatterji	Indian Navy	January 1964	January 1966	Later served as the Chief of the Naval Staff
3	Air Marshal R Rajaram DFC	Indian Air Force	January 1966	December 1966	Later served as Vice Chief of the Air Staff. Died in harness while VCAS.
4	Lieutenant General M M Khanna MVC	Indian Army	December 1966	November 1968	
5	Vice Admiral S N Kohli PVSM	Indian Navy	November 1968	April 1971	Served as Western Naval Commander during the Indo-Pakistani War of 1971 and later served as Chief of the Naval Staff of the Indian Navy
6	Air Marshal H Moolgavkar PVSM, MVC	Indian Air Force	April 1971	April 1973	Served as the Central Air Commander and Western Air Commander before taking over as the 9th Chief of the Air Staff of the Indian Air Force
7	Lieutenant General M N Batra PVSM	Indian Army	April 1973	January 1975	First ex-NDC Commandant
8	Vice Admiral S H Sarma PVSM	Indian Navy	January 1975	January 1977	Served as Flag Officer Commanding Eastern Fleet (FOCEF) during the Indo-Pakistani War of 1971 and later served as Eastern Naval Commander
9	Air Marshal T N Ghadiok PVSM, AVSM, VrC	Indian Air Force	February 1977	December 1978	
10	Lieutenant General WAG Pinto PVSM	Indian Army	January 1979	January 1980	Later served as the Central Army Commander
11	Air Marshal D G Kinglee PVSM, AVSM	Indian Air Force	September 1980	September 1982	Later served as the Central Air Commander
12	Vice Admiral R V Aarte AVSM	Indian Navy	September 1982	August 1984	
10	Lieutenant General Himmeth Singh PVSM	Indian Army	September 1984	June 1986	
13	Air Marshal P K Puri PVSM, AVSM	Indian Air Force	July 1986	August 1988	
14	Vice Admiral S P Govil PVSM, AVSM	Indian Navy	September 1988	September 1990	Later served as Vice Chief of Naval Staff
15	Lieutenant General K S Khajuria PVSM	Indian Army	September 1990	June 1992	
16	Air Marshal S Kulkarni PVSM, VM	Indian Air Force	July 1992	January 1995	
17	Vice Admiral Vinod Pasricha PVSM, AVSM, NM	Indian Navy	January 1995	December 1996	Later served as Eastern Naval Commander and Western Naval Commander
18	Lieutenant General S R R Aiyengar PVSM, AVSM, VSM	Indian Army	January 1997	April 1999	Later served as Commandant of Defence Services Staff College
19	Air Marshal V G Kumar PVSM, AVSM, VM	Indian Air Force	April 1999	March 2001	
20	Vice Admiral Yashwant Prasad PVSM, AVSM, VSM	Indian Navy	April 2001	December 2002	Later served as Southern Naval Commander and thereafter the Vice Chief of Naval Staff
21	Lieutenant General S S Chahal PVSM, AVSM, VSM	Indian Army	December 2002	June 2004	
22	Lieutenant General Tej Pathak AVSM, YSM & Bar	Indian Army	July 2004	December 2004	
23	Air Marshal P P Raj Kumar PVSM, AVSM	Indian Air Force	January 2005	December 2006	Later served as the Commander-in-Chief, Andaman and Nicobar Command and thereafter Central Air Commander
24	Vice Admiral Pradeep Kaushiva UYSM, VSM	Indian Navy	December 2006	September 2007	
25	Vice Admiral Sanjeev Bhasin PVSM, AVSM, VSM	Indian Navy	September 2007	December 2008	Later served as the Western Naval Commander
26	Lieutenant General Prakash Menon AVSM, VSM	Indian Army	January 2009	December 2010	
27	Air Marshal P K Roy AVSM, VM, VSM	Indian Air Force	January 2011	November 2012	Later served as Commander-in-Chief, Andaman and Nicobar Command
28	Vice Admiral Sunil Lanba AVSM	Indian Navy	December 2012	June 2014	Later served as the Chief of the Naval Staff
29	Lieutenant General N S Ghei PVSM, AVSM & Bar	Indian Army	June 2014	December 2016	
30	Lieutenant General Y V K Mohan SM, VSM	Indian Army	January 2017	January 2018	Later served as Commandant of Defence Services Staff College
31	Vice Admiral Srikant AVSM	Indian Navy	January 2018	16 December 2019	Later died in harness of COVID-19.
32	Air Marshal Diptendu Choudhury AVSM, VM, VSM	Indian Air Force	16 December 2019	30 October 2021	
33	Lieutenant General Manoj Kumar Mago YSM, SM & Bar	Indian Army	31 October 2021	31 December 2022	
34	Lieutenant General Sukriti Singh Dahiya SM and Bar, VSM	Indian Army	1 January 2023	30 April 2024	
35	Air Marshal Hardeep Bains AVSM, VSM	Indian Air Force	1 May 2024	30 September 2025	
36	Air Marshal Manish Kumar Gupta AVSM	Indian Air Force	1 October 2025	Included	

=== List of Commandants by branches of service ===
Branch	Count
Indian Army	14
Indian Navy	11
Indian Air Force	11

== See also ==
- Commandant of the Indian Military Academy
- Commandant of the National Defence Academy
- Commandant of Indian Naval Academy
