= Jasbir =

Jasbir may refer to:

- Jasbir Singh Bajaj, Indian Physician and Diabetologist has been conferred with the Padma Vibhushan award
- Jasbir Jassi, Punjabi singer and actor
- Jasbir Singh (cricketer), former Indian cricketer and umpire
- Jasbir Sandhu, Canadian politician
- Jasbir Walia, serving Air Marshal of the Indian Air Force and present AOC-in-C of the Southern Air Command
- Jasbir Puar, U.S.-based queer theorist who is currently an associate professor in the Department of Women's and Gender Studies at Rutgers University
