= Pankaj Mohan Sinha =

Air Officer Commanding-in-Chief, India

Air Marshal Pankaj Mohan Sinha PVSM UYSM AVSM VSM
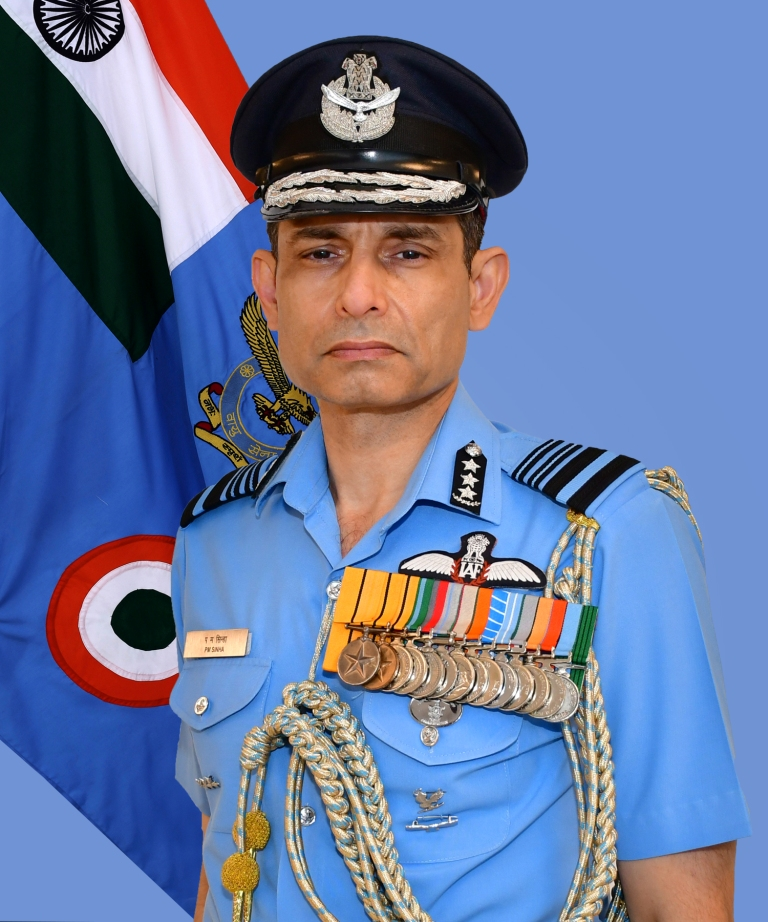

Personal details
- Awards: Param Vishisht Seva Medal; Ati Vishisht Seva Medal; Vishisht Seva Medal

Military service
- Allegiance: India
- Branch/service: Indian Air Force
- Years of service: 14 June 1985 - 31 December 2024
- Rank: Air Marshal
- Unit: No.2 Squadron
- Commands: Western Air Command
- Service number: 17842

Air Marshal Pankaj Mohan Sinha, PVSM, AVSM, VSM is a retired officer of the Indian Air Force. He served as the Air Officer Commanding-in-Chief (AOC-in-C), Western Air Command. He took over the office on 1 January 2023, succeeding of Air Marshal Sreekumar Prabhakaran and superannuated on 31 December 2024.

== Early life and education ==
Pankaj Mohan Sinha is a graduate of National Defence Academy. He is an alumnus of the Defence Services Staff College, Wellington.

== Career ==
Pankaj Mohan Sinha was commissioned as the fighter pilot in June 1985 in the Indian Air Force. In a career spanning over 37 years, he has as more than 4,500 hours of flying experience across various aircraft.

He is a Category ‘A’ Qualified Flying Instructor, Fighter Striker Leader, Instrument Rating Instructor & Examiner. He served as the Commanding Officer of No.2 Squadronin the Eastern Sector. He was also the Training Coordination Officer at the Royal Air Force College Cranwell, UK during the induction of the Hawk 132 Advanced Jet Trainers (AJT) into the Indian Air Force.

As Air Commodore, he served as the Air Assistant to Chief of Air Staff. Later, served as the Air Officer Commanding of the 40 Wing in Gwalior under Central Air Command.

As Air Vice Marshal, he served as the Air Officer Commanding of the Composite Battle Response and Analysis Group (CoBRA-G) a key unit of Indian Air Force deals with the doctrine development, force employment and strategy. After this stint, he served as the Assistant Chief of Air Staff, Ops Offensive and then oversaw the operations of Western sector as Air Officer Commanding of the Jammu & Kashmir region.

After his promotion to Air Marshal in July 2021, he served as the Director General Air Operations till 31 December 2022.

He took over as the Air Officer Commanding-in-Chief, Western Air Command on 1 January 2023, succeeding of Air Marshal Sreekumar Prabhakaran on his superannuation.

== Honours and decorations ==
During his career, Pankaj Mohan Sinha has been awarded the Param Vishisht Seva Medal in 2023, Ati Vishisht Seva Medal in 2014 and Vishisht Seva Medal in 2007.

Param Vishisht Seva Medal	Ati Vishisht Seva Medal	Vishisht Seva Medal

Military offices
Preceded by Sreekumar Prabhakaran	Air Officer Commanding-in-Chief, Western Air Command; 1 January 2023 – Present	Succeeded by Jeetendra Mishra
Preceded by Balabhadra Radha Krishna	Director General Air Operations; 1 July 2021 – 31 December 2022	Succeeded by Surat Singh
