= Rajesh Kumar (air marshal) =

Former officer in the Indian Air Force

Air Marshal Rajesh Kumar PVSM, AVSM, VM, ADC
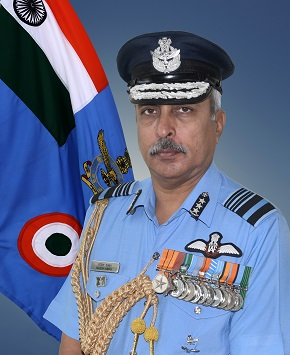
- Spouse: Jaya Kumar
- Military career
- Allegiance: India
- Branch: Indian Air Force
- Service years: 4 June 1982 – 31 August 2021
- Rank: Air Marshal
- Service number: 16770
- Commands: Strategic Forces Command; Central Air Command
- Awards: Param Vishisht Seva Medal; Ati Vishisht Seva Medal; Vayusena Medal

Air Marshal Rajesh Kumar, PVSM, AVSM, VM, ADC is a former officer in the Indian Air Force. He last served as the Commander-in-Chief, Strategic Forces Command. He assumed office on 31 January 2021 following the retirement of Air Marshal Navkaranjit Singh Dhillon. Previously he served as AOC-in-C in Central Air Command and SASO in Eastern Air Command. He superannuated on 31 August 2021.

== Early life and education ==
Kumar is an alumnus of Mayo College, Ajmer and National Defence Academy, Khadakwasla. He is a graduate from Air Command and Staff College at Montgomery, Alabama. He has also undergone the Higher Defence Management Course at the College of Defence Management at Secunderabad.

== Career ==
Kumar was commissioned into the fighter stream of the Indian Air Force on 4 June 1982. He has commanded a fighter aircraft squadron and a front-line air base. He is a category A flying instructor, instrument rating instructor and an air crew examiner. His other appointments include team leader of project monitoring team for AWACS project in Israel, director of the Indian Air Force project management team at Aeronautical Development Agency, Bangalore and Senior Air Staff Officer of Eastern Air Command, Shillong.

== Awards and medals ==
During 36 years of his career, Kumar has been awarded the Param Vishisht Seva Medal in 2021, Ati Vishisht Seva Medal in 2019, and the Vayu Sena Medal for gallantry in operation parakram.

Param Vishisht Seva Medal	Ati Vishisht Seva Medal	Vayu Sena Medal

== Personal life ==
Rajesh Kumar is married to Jaya Kumar. They have 2 sons.

Military offices
Preceded by Navkaranjit Singh Dhillon	Commander-in-Chief, Strategic Forces Command; 1 February 2021 – 31 August 2021	Succeeded by R. B. Pandit
Preceded by Shyam Bihari Prasad Sinha	Air Officer Commanding-in-Chief, Central Air Command; 1 January 2019 – 31 January 2021	Succeeded by Amit Tiwari
Preceded by Raghunath Nambiar	Senior Air Staff Officer - Eastern Air Command; 1 March 2017 – 31 December 2018	Succeeded by Sandeep Singh
