= Diptendu Choudhury =

Air Marshal, India

Air Marshal Diptendu Choudhury PVSM AVSM VM VSM
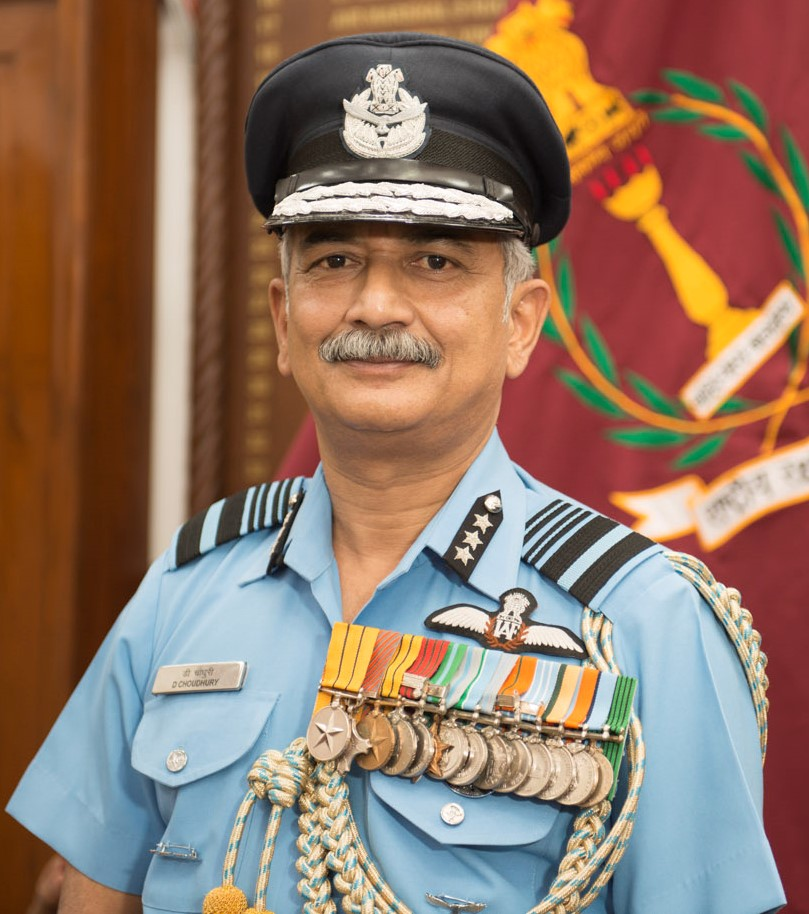

Commandant, National Defence College
- In office 16 December 2019 – 30 November 2021
- Preceded by: Srikant
- Succeeded by: Manoj Kumar Mago

Personal details
- Awards: Param Vishisht Seva Medal; Ati Vishisht Seva Medal; Vayu Sena Medal; Vishisht Seva Medal

Military service
- Allegiance: India
- Branch/service: Indian Air Force
- Years of service: 22 December 1983 – 30 November 2021
- Rank: Air Marshal
- Unit: No. 15 Squadron
- Commands: National Defence College; Tactics and Air Combat Development Establishment; No. 15 Squadron; No. 24 Squadron
- Battles/wars: Kargil War; Operation Parakram
- Service number: 17335

Air Marshal Diptendu Choudhury, PVSM, AVSM, VM, VSM is a retired officer of the Indian Air Force. He served as the 32nd Commandant, National Defence College. He assumed the office on 16 December 2019 succeeding Vice Admiral Srikant and served till his superannuation on 30 November 2021.

== Early life and education ==
Diptendu Choudhury's father was an officer in the Indian Air Force and he did his schooling from The Air Force School, Delhi Cantt. Choudhury is an alumnus of National Defence Academy, Pune and The Air Force Academy (India), Dundigal. He is also an alumnus of Royal College of Defence Studies, UK. He is a Post Graduate in Strategy and International Security from King's College, London and Master of Philosophy in Defence and Strategic Studies.

== Career ==
Diptendu Choudhury was commissioned as a fighter pilot in the Indian Air Force. In a career spanning over 37 years, he has as more than 5000 hours of flying experience across various fighter aircraft. He is fully operational on MiG-21, MiG-27, MiG-29 and Su-30 aircraft.

He is a qualified Fighter Combat Leader, an Instrument Rating Instructor and an Examiner. He has served two tenures at TACDE first as an Instructor and then as its Commandant. He has led three International exercises – Red Flag, Desert Eagle and Garuda exercise.

As Group Captain, he served as the Commandant of Tactics and Air Combat Development Establishment at Gwalior. Later, he served as Director (Joint Planning) at the Air Headquarters (Air HQ), New Delhi.

As Air Commodore, he served as the Air Officer Commanding (AOC) of 35 Wing at Suratgarh, Rajasthan under the South Western Air Command. He subsequently attended the Royal College of Defence Studies, London. His Indian course mates at the RCDS were Brigadier Ranbir Singh and Commodore Philipose George Pynumootil. Later, he served as the AOC of 1 Wing at Srinagar under the Western Air Command.

As Air Vice Marshal, he served as the Air Defence Commander at Central Air Command. Later, he served as the Air Officer Commanding (AOC) at the Composite Battle Response and Analysis Group (CoBRA) at Maharajpur. He also served as Air Defence Commander at the South Western Air Command situated in Gandhinagar. He has served as the Assistant Chief of Air Staff, Inspection at the 'Air Headquarters (Air HQ)' in Delhi.

After his promotion to Air Marshal in April 2019, he served as the Senior Air Staff Officer (SASO), Western Air Command till 15 December 2019.

He took over as the Commandant, National Defence College on 16 December 2019 from Vice Admiral Srikant. Under his command, a Chair of Excellence on National Security was set up at the National Defence College.

After his retirement he is on the Visiting Faculty of various defence institutions. He is currently pursuing Ph.D. in air power and has also authored a large number of service papers. He is serving as a Distinguished Fellow, at Vivekananda International Foundation. He has authored a book on 'Indian Air Power.' He was also the Indian Air Force Advisor on the Hindi feature film Fighter.

== Honours and decorations ==
During his career, Diptendu Choudhury has been awarded the Commendation card by the Chief of the Air Staff in 1992, Param Vishisht Seva Medal in 2022, Ati Vishisht Seva Medal in 2018, Vayu Sena Medal in 2011 and Vishisht Seva Medal in 2007 for his service.

| Param Vishisht Seva Medal | Ati Vishisht Seva Medal | Vayu Sena Medal | |
| Vishisht Seva Medal | General Service Medal 1947 | Samanya Seva Medal | Operation Vijay Star |
| Operation Parakram Medal | Operation Vijay Medal | Sainya Seva Medal | Videsh Seva Medal |
| 50th Independence Anniversary Medal | 30 Years Long Service Medal | 20 Years Long Service Medal | 9 Years Long Service Medal |

Military offices
| Preceded by Srikant | Commandant, National Defence College; 16 December 2019 – 30 November 2021 | Succeeded by Manoj Kumar Mago |
| Preceded by Navkaranjit Singh Dhillon | Senior Air Staff Officer - Western Air Command; 1 April 2019 – 15 December 2019 | Succeeded by Richard John Duckworth |
