= Rajiv Dayal Mathur =

Indian Air Force officer

Air Marshal Rajiv Dayal Mathur PVSM, AVSM, VSM, ADC
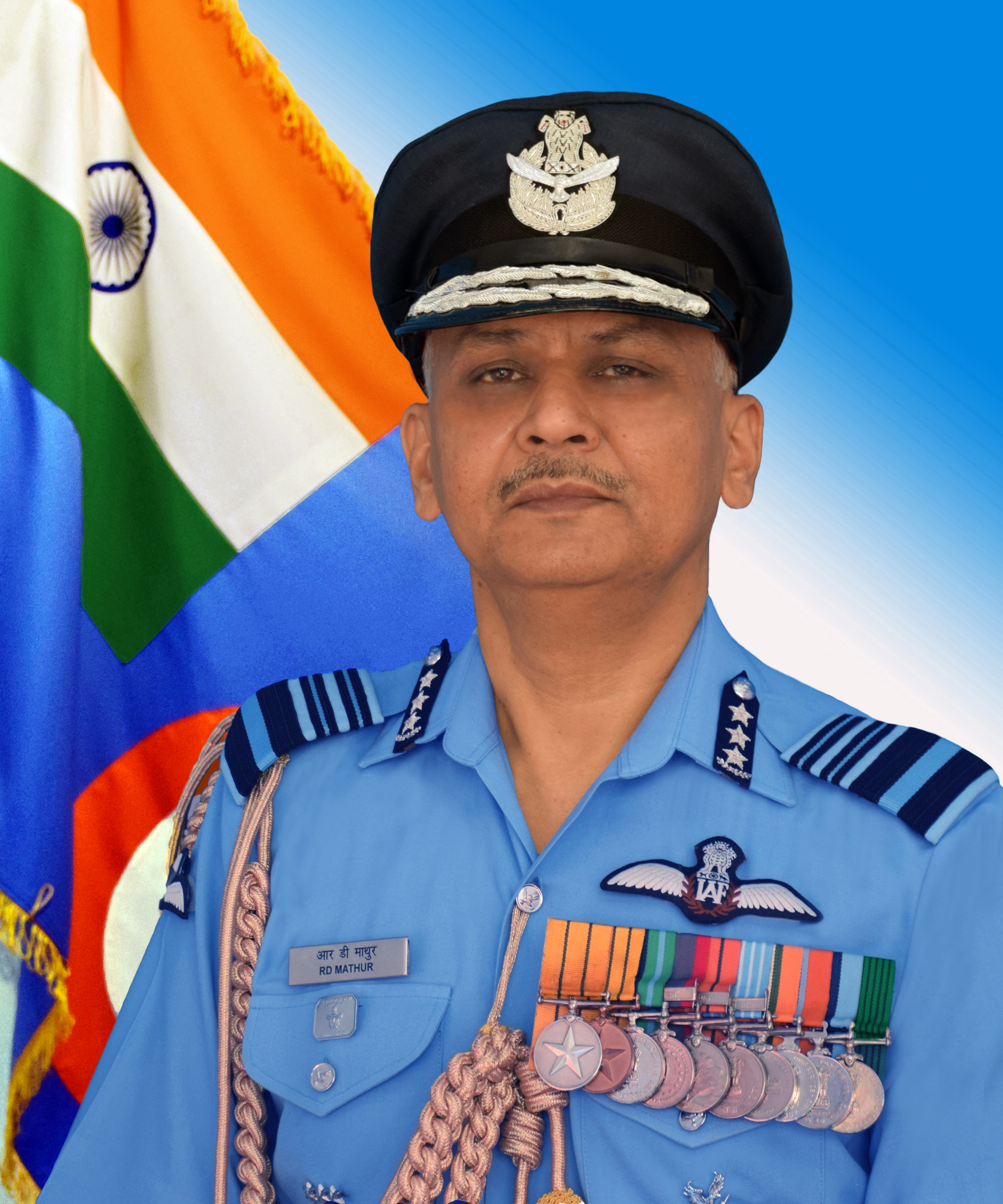
- Military career
- Allegiance: India
- Branch: Indian Air Force
- Service years: 4 June 1982 – 31 July 2021
- Rank: Air Marshal
- Service number: 16772
- Unit: No. 15 Squadron
- Commands: Training Command; Eastern Air Command
- Awards: Param Vishisht Seva Medal; Ati Vishisht Seva Medal; Vishisht Seva Medal

Air Marshal Rajiv Dayal Mathur, PVSM, AVSM, VSM, ADC is a former officer in the Indian Air Force. He was the Air Officer Commanding-in-Chief (AOC-in-C), Training Command. He assumed the office on 1 October 2020 succeeding Air Marshal Arvindra Singh Butola. He served as Air Officer Commanding-in-Chief (AOC-in-C), Eastern Air Command from 1 March 2019 to 30 September 2020. He superannuated on 31 July 2021.

== Early life and education ==
Mathur did his schooling from St Joseph's Academy, Dehradun. He joined National Defence Academy in 1978. He is an alumnus of the Defence Services Staff College, Wellington and the National Defence College, New Delhi. He also holds M.Sc and M Phil degrees in Defence and Strategic Studies from Madras University.

== Career ==
Mathur was commissioned as a fighter pilot in the Indian Air Force on 4 June 1982. He is a qualified flight instructor and has flying experience of over 5000 hours on a variety of fighter aircraft and helicopters.

He has commanded a fighter aircraft squadron and a front-line air base. He has held various other appointments including Principal Director of information and electronics warfare, Assistant Chief of Air Staff (space) at air headquarters New Delhi, and air defence commander at headquarters Eastern Air Command. He has also been in-charge of air force's Air Warfare Strategy Cell as well as space, cyber, air traffic services and media and public relations directorate. He took over the position of Senior Air Staff Officer, South Western Air Command in August 2018.

== Honours and decorations ==
During his career, Mathur has been awarded the Vishisht Seva Medal (VSM) in 2003, the Ati Vishisht Seva Medal (AVSM) in 2014, and the Param Vishisht Seva Medal (PVSM) in 2021 for his service.

Param Vishisht Seva Medal	Ati Vishisht Seva Medal	Vishisht Seva Medal

== Personal life ==
Air Marshal Mathur is married to Shipra Mathur who is the president of Air Force Wives Welfare Association (Regional).

Military offices
Preceded by Arvindra Singh Butola	Air Officer Commanding-in-Chief, Training Command; 1 October 2020 – 31 July 2021	Succeeded by Manavendra Singh
Preceded by Raghunath Nambiar	Air Officer Commanding-in-Chief, Eastern Air Command; 1 March 2019 – 30 September 2020	Succeeded by Amit Dev
