= Jasvir Singh =

Jasvir Singh may refer to:

- Jasvir Singh (kabaddi) (born 1984), Indian kabaddi player
- Jasvir Singh (weightlifter) (born 1977), Canadian weightlifter
- Jasvir Singh (barrister) (born 1980), British family law barrister
