= No. 35 Squadron IAF =

35 Squadron
- Active: 10 August 1958 — 2019
- Country: India
- Branch: Indian Air Force
- Role: EW, Air superiority
- Garrison/HQ: AFS Bakshi Ka Talab (Lucknow)
- Motto: Drutpraharnayudha "Armed to Strike Fast"
- Battle honours: Liberation of Goa; Western air ops, 1965; Liberation war,1971

Insignia
- Identification symbol: Erect Rapier

Aircraft flown
- Fighter: Mikoyan-Gurevich MiG-21

No. 35 Squadron IAF (Rapiers) was an electronic warfare and air superiority squadron of the Indian Air Force (IAF). It was based at Bakshi Ka Talab Airforce Station, No. 35 Squadron came under the Central Air Command; and along with No. 108 Squadron formed an operational wing of the IAF. As of 2017, it was equipped with MiG-21M aircraft. The squadron was number plated in 2019.

== Crest ==
No. 35 Squadron has as its emblem an erect Rapier. Below this crest, on a scroll is inscribed Drutpraharnayudha.

== History ==
No 35 squadron was raised in Pune on 10 August 1958 equipped with Canberra B(I) 58 under the command of Wg Cdr NB Naik. It became the fourth unit to operate the Canberra bomber in the Indian Air Force and was initially tasked with high altitude bombing and interdiction as well as reconnaissance roles. The unit also appears to have had a secondary responsibility of high altitude weather research. No. 35 Sqn has been involved in all of India's major military operations, from the liberation of Goa to Operation Safed Sagar during the Kargil War, when it was deployed Kashmir Valley and the Rann of Kutch.

A Canberra of the No. 35 Squadron. The Rapier emblem is clearly visible

=== Goa Operations ===
The squadron's first operation was in 1961 during the annexation of Goa when it flew against Dabolim Airport in Portuguese-held Goa. Flying from Pune, No. 35 was deployed along with No. 16 in the opening missions against the airfield on 18 December when 12 Canberras of No. 35 led by Wg. Cdr. N.B. Menon struck the runway at Dabolim with 1000lbers. The flight was, however, under orders not to strike terminals and facilities. There appears to have been plans for strikes against Diu Airport, but appears to have been called off due to proximity of friendly forces.

No.35 Sqn's Canberras were first moved north during the confrontation with China. In the event that no air action was authorized during the conflict in November 1962, no combat sorties were flown by any Canberra units.

=== 1965 Indo-Pak War ===
The squadron's first sustained combat operations occurred during the Indo-Pakistani War of 1965. The squadron then based at Halwara under Wg Cdr AS Bakshi went on alert in late August 1965. Over a ten-day period, beginning 1 September 1965, the squadron flew 69 operational sorties. The most intense missions against Mauripur, Kasur, and Sargodha being flown between 7 and 13 September. The Squadron flew with distinction (Sqn Ldr JP Gupta earning a Mention-in-Despatches for bombing Kasur).

=== 1971 Bangladesh Liberation War ===
The war in 1971 provided this young squadron an opportunity to perform to its full potential. During the war, No.35 Sqn's Canberras flew day and night missions on both fronts. A total of 92 operational sorties amounting to 900 hours were undertaken by the squadron during the conflict. The highlight of war was its bombing of the oil refinery at Karachi - resulting in, according to a recce pilot, "the biggest blaze ever seen over South Asia." While the squadron lost an aircraft and two pilots (Flt Lt SC Sandal and Flt Lt KS Nanda) over Karachi, the raid earned Wg Cdr KK Badhwar a Vir Chakra. Over the course of the conflict the squadron earned one Ati Vishisht Seva Medal, five Vir Chakras, six Vishisht Seva Medals, one Vayu Sena Medal and three Mention-in-Despatches.

=== Later operations ===
The Squadron went on alert during Operation Safed Sagar in the summer of 1999. The squadron deployed a flight each to support offensive and defensive operations by Western and South Western Air Command (SWAC). No.35 Sqn's aircraft deployed to bases in Kashmir as well as to the Rann of Kutch.

It was re-equipped with modified Canberra B(I) 58 and MiG-21Ms for dedicated EW role. In 1978, the unit was moved to AFS Bareilly. Since the 1980s, No.35 Squadron has played an important role in collaborating with DRDO in the evaluation of Electronic Warfare (EW) systems and armaments. The unit's Canberra flight was withdrawn in 1997 and re-equipped with EW-equipped MiG-21Ms. The unit also fills an important training role. In 2001 the Squadron phased out it Canberra B(I) 58. The squadron is currently in the process of upgrading its equipment from the MIG21 BIS aircraft.

In addition to providing support to offensive air operations, the Rapiers play a crucial role in providing flying effort towards EW related training for the IAF's own air defense units and currently operates from Bakshi-Ka-Talab. The squadron was number plated in 2019. Currently, only 2 MiG-21 Bison squadron remains in service.No 35 Sqn was last in news as the unit, which took over the Mig-25 Fleet when No. 102 Squadron IAF (Trisonics) was disbanded. The Canberra Flight of 35 Sqn has been dissolved and the Mig21-bis will also be retired over a period of time. No 35 Sqn has been reduced to paper status and the unit will acquire new aircraft and a new role in the near future.

== Aircraft ==
Aircraft	From	To	Air Base
English Electric Canberra B(I).58	10 August 1958	February 1990	AFS Lohegaon
MiG-25 R	February 2003	February 2006	
MiG-21 M	February 1978	2001	AFS Bareilly
MiG-21 M	2001	2019	AFS Bakshi Ka Talab (Lucknow)

== Notes and references ==
This squadron has been currently moved to Rajasthan sector.
