= Amit Tiwari (air marshal) =

Indian air marshal

Air Marshal Amit Tiwari PVSM, AVSM, VM
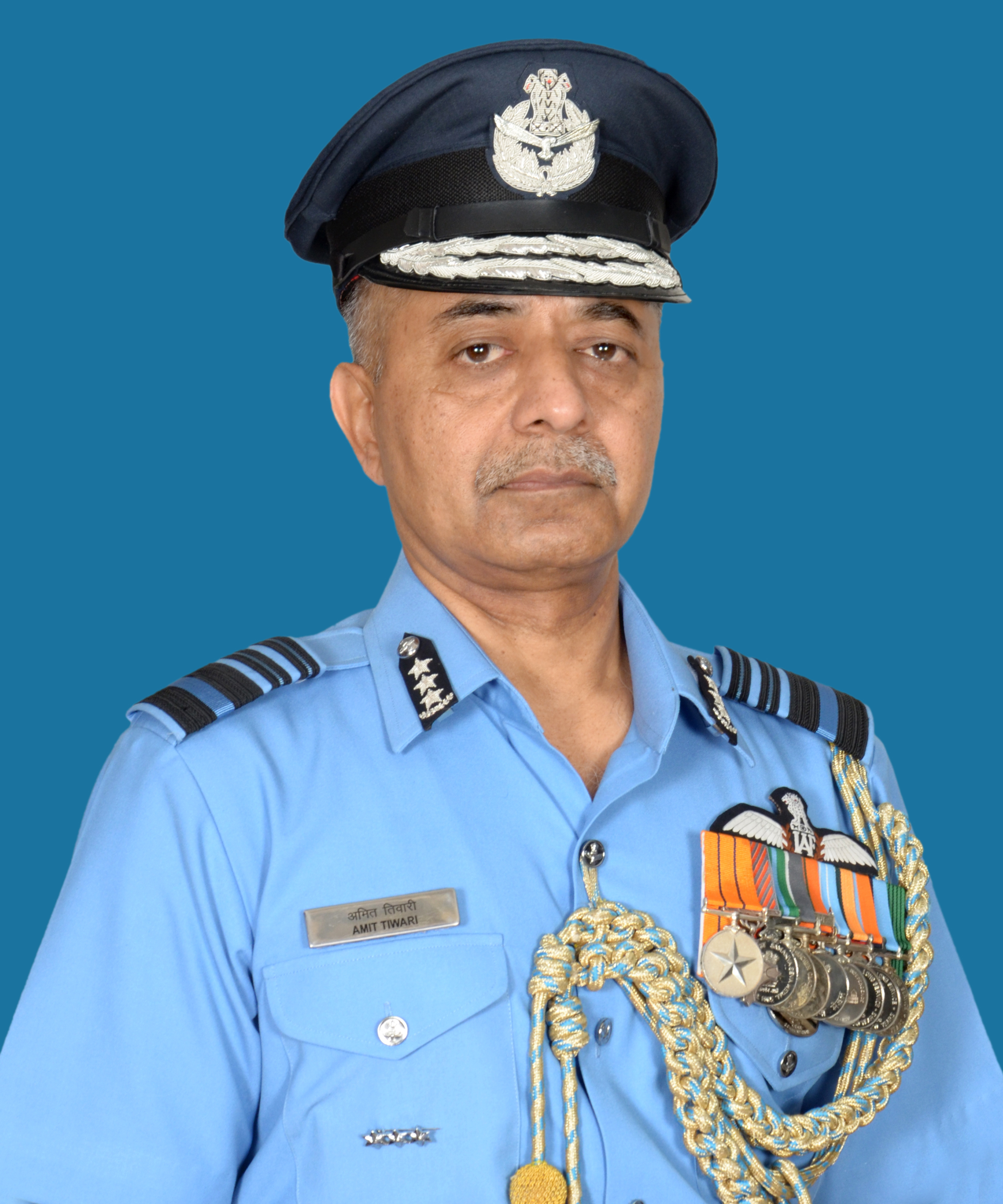
- Military career
- Allegiance: India
- Branch: Indian Air Force
- Service years: June 1982 - 31 May 2021
- Rank: Air Marshal
- Service number: 16806
- Commands: Central Air Command; Southern Air Command
- Awards: Param Vishisht Seva Medal; Ati Vishisht Seva Medal; Vayu Sena Medal

Air Marshal Amit Tiwari, PVSM, AVSM, VM is a retired officer of the Indian Air Force. He served as the Air Officer Commanding-in-Chief (AOC-in-C), Central Air Command. He assumed the office on 1 February 2021 succeeding Air Marshal Rajesh Kumar and served till 31 May 2021. He is succeeded by Air Marshal Richard John Duckworth. Previously, he served as AOC-in-C of Southern Air Command.

== Early life and education ==
Amit is an alumnus of National Defence Academy. He is also a graduate of Defence Services Staff College, College of Defence Management and National Defence College.

== Career ==
Amit was commissioned in the Indian Air Force as a fighter pilot in June 1982. He is a qualified flight instructor, and has a flying experience of over 3500 hours on various fighter aircraft.

In his career, he has held several positions including team leader of Surya Kiran aerobatic squadron, station commander of a forward base, air attache at Indian embassy in Afghanistan, as well as air defence commander and senior officer-in-charge of administration at an operational command. His other appointments include assistant chief of air staff (training) at air headquarters and commandant air force academy.

Prior to his appointment as AOC-in-C, Southern Air command, Amit served as Air Officer in charge of Personnel at air headquarters, VayuSena Bhawan in New Delhi.

== Honours and decorations ==
During his career, Amit has been awarded the VayuSena Medal (VM) and the Ati Vishisht Seva Medal (AVSM) and the Param Vishisht Seva Medal in 2021 for his service.

Param Vishisht Seva Medal	Ati Vishisht Seva Medal	Vayu Sena Medal

== Personal life ==
Amit is married to Poonam Tiwari.

== See also ==
- A.K. Bharti

Military offices
Preceded by Rajesh Kumar	Air Officer Commanding-in-Chief, Central Air Command; 1 February 2021 – 31 May 2021	Succeeded by Richard John Duckworth
Preceded by Balakrishnan Suresh	Air Officer Commanding-in-Chief, Southern Air Command; 1 November 2019 – 31 January 2021	Succeeded by Manavendra Singh
Preceded by Gurinder Pal Singh	Commandant – Air Force Academy; 2016 - 2018	Succeeded by Arvindra Singh Butola
