= Jasbir Walia =

Air Marshal Jasbir Walia PVSM, VM, VSM, ADC
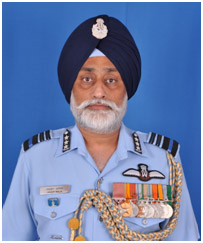
- Spouse: Harbinder Walia
- Military career
- Allegiance: India
- Branch: Indian Air Force
- Service years: 15 June 1979 – 31 March 2019
- Rank: Air Marshal
- Service number: 15684
- Commands: Strategic Forces Command; Southern Air Command
- Awards: Param Vishisht Seva Medal; Vayu Sena Medal; Vishisht Seva Medal

Air Marshal Jasbir Walia PVSM, VM, VSM, ADC is a former air officer of the Indian Air Force. He last served as the Commander-in-Chief, Strategic Forces Command from 1 August 2016 to 31 March 2019. Commissioned into the Indian Air Force in 1979, Walia has held several important appointments as a commanding officer, at Air Headquarters, at the headquarters of various commands of the Indian Air Force (IAF), as an attaché, and has also served as an instructor and as a deputy commandant of various training academies.

== Personal life and education ==
Walia graduated from the National Defence Academy (NDA), Khadakwasla. He attended a staff course at Defence Services Staff College, Wellington Cantonment, and also attended the Air War Course at the Air War College, Montgomery, Alabama, USA.

He is married to Harbinder Walia; the couple has a son and a daughter.

== Military career ==
Walia was commissioned in the flying branch (fighter stream) of the Indian Air Force on 15 June 1979. He flew various types of aircraft from the inventory of the Indian Air Force including the MiG-21, SEPECAT Jaguar, and training aircraft. As well as being a qualified flying instructor, he is also a pilot attack instructor and a fighter combat leader.

His operational assignments have included commanding officer of Jaguar squadron, held for a maritime strike role, and he has also served as station commander. His appointments at Air Headquarters included director of tactical operations. He held various apex positions at Indian Air Force training academies including as a member of the directing staff, and as deputy commandant at Tactics and Air Combat Defence Establishment, as deputy commandant of the College of Air Warfare (CAW), Secunderabad. He also served as the air attaché at the Indian Embassy located in Washington, D.C., and as the air officer commanding (AOC) of the Jammu and Kashmir Area.

Walia served as the senior air staff officer at the headquarters of the Eastern Air Command before assuming the office of AOC-in-C of the Southern Air Command, the 24th officer to hold the post. He held the post of AOC-in-C Souther Air Command from 1 June 2015 to 31 July 2016, succeeded by Air Marshal Sunderraman Neelakantan.

== Awards and medals ==
Walia was conferred the Param Vishisht Seva Medal in January 2017, Vayu Sena Medal in 2000 and the Vishisht Seva Medal in 2005 by the President of India.

Param Vishisht Seva Medal	Vayusena Medal		Vishisht Seva Medal
General Service Medal	Operation Vijay Star	Operation Parakram Medal	Operation Vijay Medal
Sainya Seva Medal	30 Years Long Service Medal	20 Years Long Service Medal	9 Years Long Service Medal

Military offices
Preceded by Lt General Amit Sharma	Commander-in-Chief, Strategic Forces Command; 1 August 2016 – 31 March 2019	Succeeded by Air Marshal Navkaranjit Singh Dhillon
Preceded by Arun Purushottam Garud	Air Officer Commanding-in-Chief, Southern Air Command; 1 June 2015 – 31 July 2016	Succeeded by Sunderraman Neelakantan
