= Chengalam South =

Chengalam south
- village
- Location in Kerala, India Chengalam south (India)
- Coordinates: 9°35′0″N 76°28′0″E
- Country: India
- State: Kerala
- District: Kottayam

Languages
  - Official: Malayalam, English
- Time zone: UTC+5:30 (IST)
- Telephone code: 0481
- Vehicle registration: KL-5
- Nearest city: Kottayam

Chengalam South is a small hamlet located in Thiruvarpu panchayath in Kottayam town of Kerala, India.

== History ==
It is believed that the name Chengalam came from the word chenkulam (Red soiled ponds). Chempakaseri family and Pattathanam family were staying in this place. Pattathanam family is still a well known family in this area. The place was once completely paddy fields. Now so many houses and buildings are in this village. The place is now easier to build big buildings since paddy fields were converted to land. During flood time this village was completely under water. Now the road has been rebuilt and floods are not affecting transportation.

== Geography ==
The Branch of Meenachil River flows through this village. The village consists of two type of terrestrials. The area near Kumarakom is a part of north Kuttanad full of paddy fields. The north area is a hilly area and it is known as Kunnumpuram. The southern area is always threatened by flood. The river goes directly to Vemabanad Lake but it is very narrow in this region. That is the main reason for the floods in this area.

The major occupation in Chenagalam was farming. Rice is the important agricultural product. Farmers follow the traditional two crops per year. But because of the continuous floods farmers are dropping the monsoon crops.

The nearest city with over a million people to Chenagalam South is Kochi, which is approximately 75 kilometres to the north-west of Chengalam South. However, due to Chenagalam South not having its own train station, any journeys to Kochi would have to go to Kottayam, a city with 800,000 people, to go to it

== Demographics ==
The main religions followed by the villagers in Chengalam are Hinduism, Islam and Christianity.

According to the 2011 Census, Chengalam South has a population of 16,111 with a sex ratio of 1,034 females per 1,000. The 2011 census also tells us that around 52% of the population are Hindus, 28.2% are Muslims, 19.6% are Christians and the remaining 0.13% are made up of other religions or none. This means that there are several places of worship for all these different religions, such as the Chengalathu Kavu Devi Temple for Hindus, the St. Mary's Knanaya Jacobite Church for Christians and the Thableegul Islam Masjid for Muslims.

By road, Chengalam is about 8 km on the Kottayam–Kumarakom route. The nearest railway station is Kottayam Railway Station,.

Kumarakom (3 km) is a nearby tourist attraction.

== Culture ==
Chengalathu Kavu Devi Temple (Chengalath Kavu) and Madhathil Bhagavathi Temple (ooranma temple of kumaranallor devi temple) are the most famous and major Hindu worship places in the village. Meena Bharani is the mostly celebrated festival in Chengalathu kavu temple and Thrikkarthika is the festival time of Madhathil Bhagavathi Temple. People across all the quarters of society take part in it irrespective of their religion.

St Mary's Knanaya Jacobite Church Chengalam is one of the Christian churches in Chengalam. There are other Christian denomination's churches, too, situated at Chengalam Kunnupuram. St. Thomas Jacobite church is the oldest church in Chengalam. St. Joseph Catholic Church of Vijyapuram diocese is also situated at Chengalam Kunnupuram. Situated Seventh-Day Adventist Church, North Kerala Section of SDA, since 1932. Then other Pentecostal denomination prayer halls also have a place in Chengalam Kunnupuram's area.
