= Thiruvarppu =

Thiruvarppu തിരുവാർപ്പ്
- Village
- Location within India Location within Kerala
- Coordinates: 9°34′51.955″N 76°28′29.533″E
- Country: India
- State/Province: Kerala
- District: Kottayam

Government
  - Type: Grama Panchayat
  - Body: Thiruvarppu Grama Panchayat
  - Party: (CPI)

Population (2011)
  - Total: 13,324

Languages
  - Official: Malayalam, English
- Time zone: IST
- Postal code: 686020
- Telephone Code: 0481
- Vehicle registration: KL-05
- Nearest city: Kottayam
- Lok Sabha constituency: Ettumanoor
- Climate: Tropical monsoon (Köppen)
- Avg. summer temperature: 35 °C (95 °F)
- Avg. winter temperature: 20 °C (68 °F)

Thiruvarppu is a village in Kottayam district in the state of Kerala, India. 7 kilometres away from Kottayam Town. Thiruvarppu is famous for the famous Krishna temple.

== Demographics ==
As of 2011 India census, Thiruvarppu had a population of 13,324 with 6,531 males and 6,793 females.

== Transportation ==
The nearest railway stations is Kottayam railway station, located almost 8 km away. The nearest International Airport is Cochin International Airport, located 89.4 km from Thiruvarppu. Multiple bus services also run between Thiruvarppu and other villages in Kottayam district.

== See also ==
- Chengalam South
