= Inspector General of Flight Safety =

An Inspector General of Flight Safety, also known as Director General (Inspection and Safety) [DG I&S] is an Air Marshal in rank and is one of the Principal Staff Officers of Air Headquarters. He is responsible to the CAS for Inspection of Air Force Bases, Flight Safety and Quality Assurance of Air Force Stores.

Six principal staff officers, the vice chief of air staff, the deputy chief of air staff, the air officer in charge of administration, the air officer in charge of personnel, the air officer in charge of maintenance, and the inspector general of flight safety assist the Chief of Air Staff, who is also an Air Chief Marshal.

The IG of Flight Safety is a 3 star officer of the rank of Air Marshal.
