= Southern Air Command (India) =

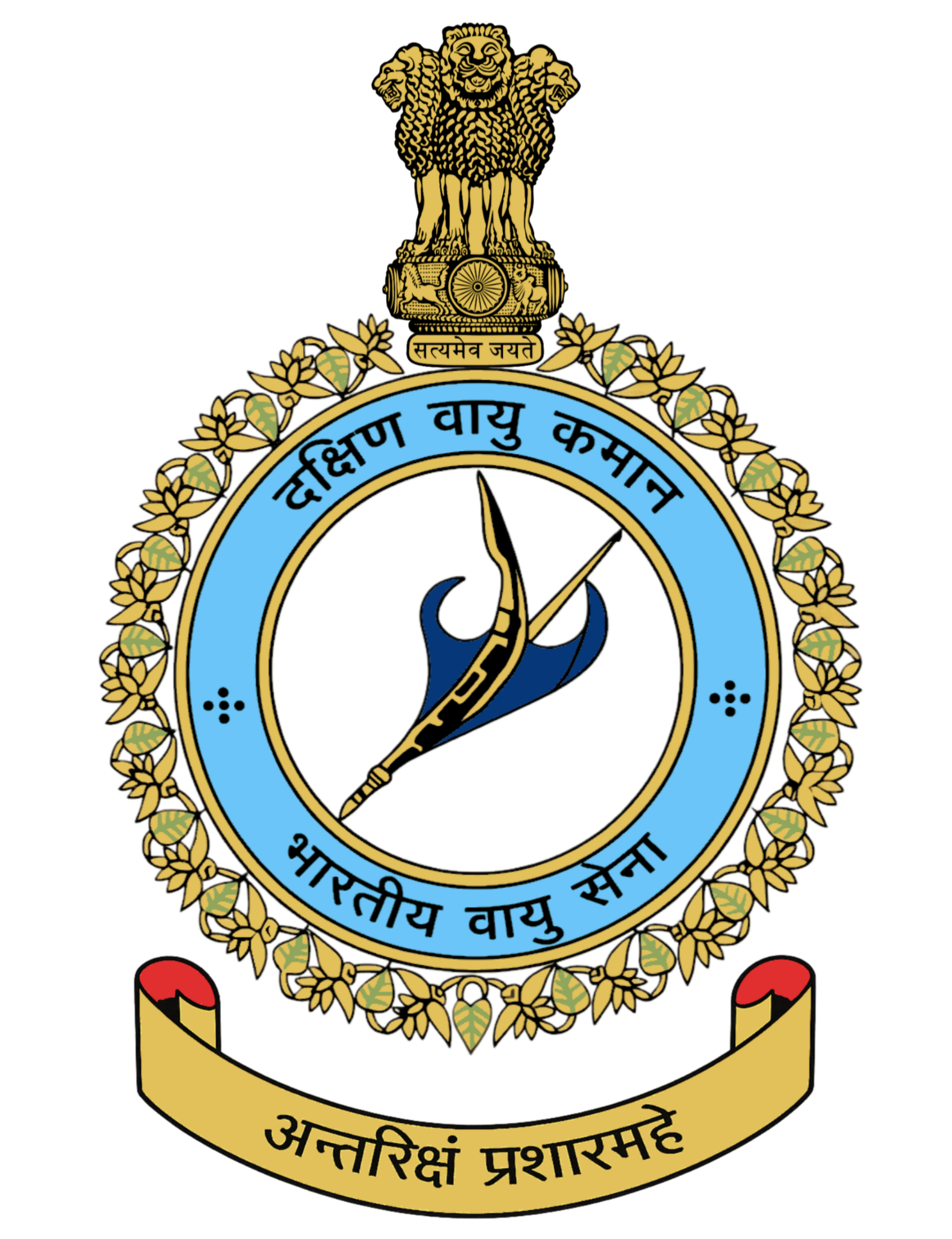
- Emblem of the Southern Air Command
- Founded: 19 July 1984
- Country: India
- Allegiance: India
- Branch: Indian Air Force
- Type: Operational Air Command
- Headquarters: Thiruvananthapuram, Kerala
- Mottos: Sanskrit: Antariksham Prashasmahe; We Command the space

Commanders
- Air Officer Commanding-in-Chief: Air Marshal Jasvir Singh Mann AVSM, VM

The Southern Air Command (SAC) of the Indian Air Force (IAF) is headquartered in Thiruvananthapuram, which is on the southwestern side of India. This is one among the seven commands of IAF. This command was started on 19 July 1984 and is relatively new among the other commands. The conflicts in Sri Lanka and the need for establishing a strong base over the Indian Ocean resulted to the formation of this new command. The SAC was inaugurated by Prime Minister Indira Gandhi.

From 1984 to 1999, the command grew from 5 lodger units to 17 lodger units under its jurisdiction. Air-sea rescue in the Indian Ocean may be among the command's tasks.

== Organization ==
Squadrons include:

Squadron	Base	Equipment	Notes
No. 121 Helicopter Flight, IAF	Car Nicobar Air Force Station	Mi-17	No. 37 Wing
No. 122 Helicopter Flight, IAF	Car Nicobar Air Force Station	Mi-17 V5	No. 37 Wing
No. 33 Squadron IAF	Sulur Air Force Station	Antonov An-32	No. 43 Wing
No. 109 Helicopter Unit, IAF	Sulur Air Force Station	Mi-17 V5	No. 43 Wing
No. 45 Squadron IAF	Sulur Air Force Station	HAL Tejas	No. 43 Wing
No. 222 Squadron IAF	Thanjavur Air Force Station	Sukhoi Su-30 MKI	No. 47 Wing

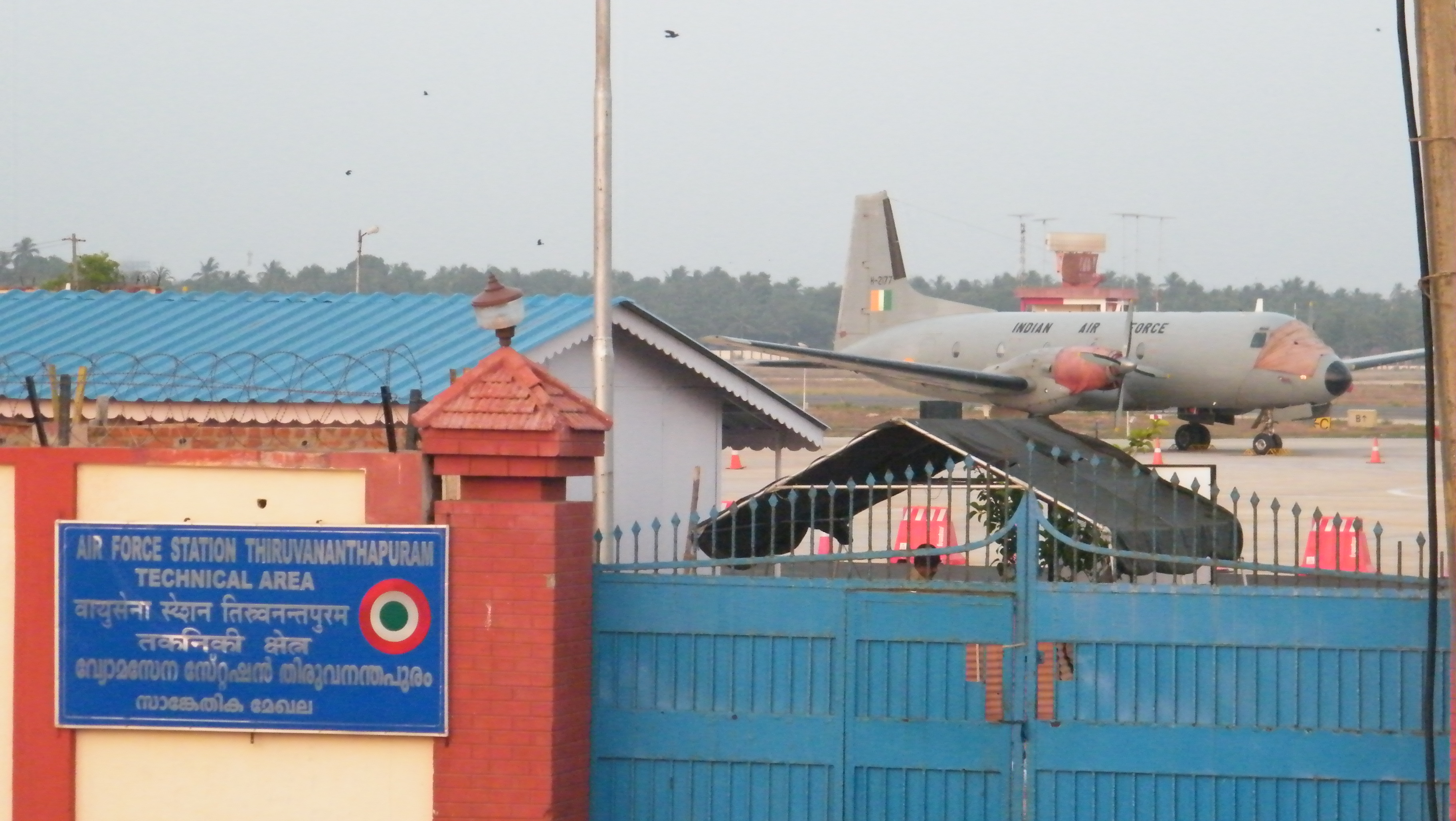
Technical area of the air command in Shangumukham near the Trivandrum International Airport

== Air Officer Commanding-in-Chief ==
List of Air Officer Commanding-in-Chief
Rank	Name	From	To
Air Marshal	Joseph Desa	18 June 1984	30 November 1986
Air Marshal	Rajagopal Sriramulu Naidu	1 January 1986	30 September 1987
Air Marshal	Gandharva Sen	21 December 1987	31 October 1989
Air Marshal	Suresh Chand	7 November 1989	31 March 1991
Air Marshal	Sukh Dev Mohan	13 May 1991	30 April 1992
Air Marshal	Ravinder Nath Bharadwaj	1 May 1992	31 July 1993
Air Marshal	Sherwin Derek Leslie Tully	3 September 1993	31 March 1995
Air Marshal	Bharat Kumar	1 May 1995	30 April 1997
Air Marshal	Krishnan Narayan Nair	1 May 1997	2 June 1999
Air Marshal	Darshan Singh Basra	15 January 1999	31 August 2000
Air Marshal	Manjit Singh Sekhon	1 September 2000	12 March 2002
Air Marshal	Tej Mohan Asthana	18 March 2002	31 December 2002
Air Marshal	Anil Kumar Trikha	1 January 2003	31 December 2003
Air Marshal	Sunil Kumar Malik	2 January 2004	30 September 2004
Air Marshal	Sharad Yeshwant Savur	1 August 2004	31 August 2006
Air Marshal	Padamjit Singh Ahluwalia	1 September 2006	31 January 2007
Air Marshal	Yashwant Rao Rane	1 February 2007	31 March 2008
Air Marshal	Suresh Chandra Mukul	1 April 2008	30 September 2008
Air Marshal	Sadasivan Radhakrishnan	1 October 2008	31 August 2009
Air Marshal	Sumit Mukerji	1 September 2009	30 June 2011
Air Marshal	Satish Pal Singh	1 July 2011	31 July 2012
Air Marshal	Rakesh Kumar Jolly	1 August 2012	31 December 2013
Air Marshal	Arun Purushottam Garud	1 January 2014	31 May 2015
Air Marshal	Jasbir Walia	1 June 2015	31 July 2016
Air Marshal	Sunderraman Neelakantan	1 August 2016	1 March 2017
Air Marshal	Rakesh Kumar Singh Bhadauria	1 March 2017	1 August 2018
Air Marshal	Balakrishnan Suresh	1 August 2018	30 October 2019
Air Marshal	Amit Tiwari	1 November 2019	31 January 2021
Air Marshal	Manavendra Singh	1 February 2021	25 September 2021
Air Marshal	Jonnalagedda Chalapati	4 October 2021	31 March 2023
Air Marshal	Balakrishnan Manikantan	1 May 2023	30 April 2025
Air Marshal	Manish Khanna	1 June 2025	30 June 2026
Air Marshal	Jasvir Singh Mann	1 July 2026	Incumbent
