= Nagesh Kapoor =

Former Vice Chief of the Air Staff, India

Air Marshal Nagesh Kapoor SYSM PVSM AVSM VM
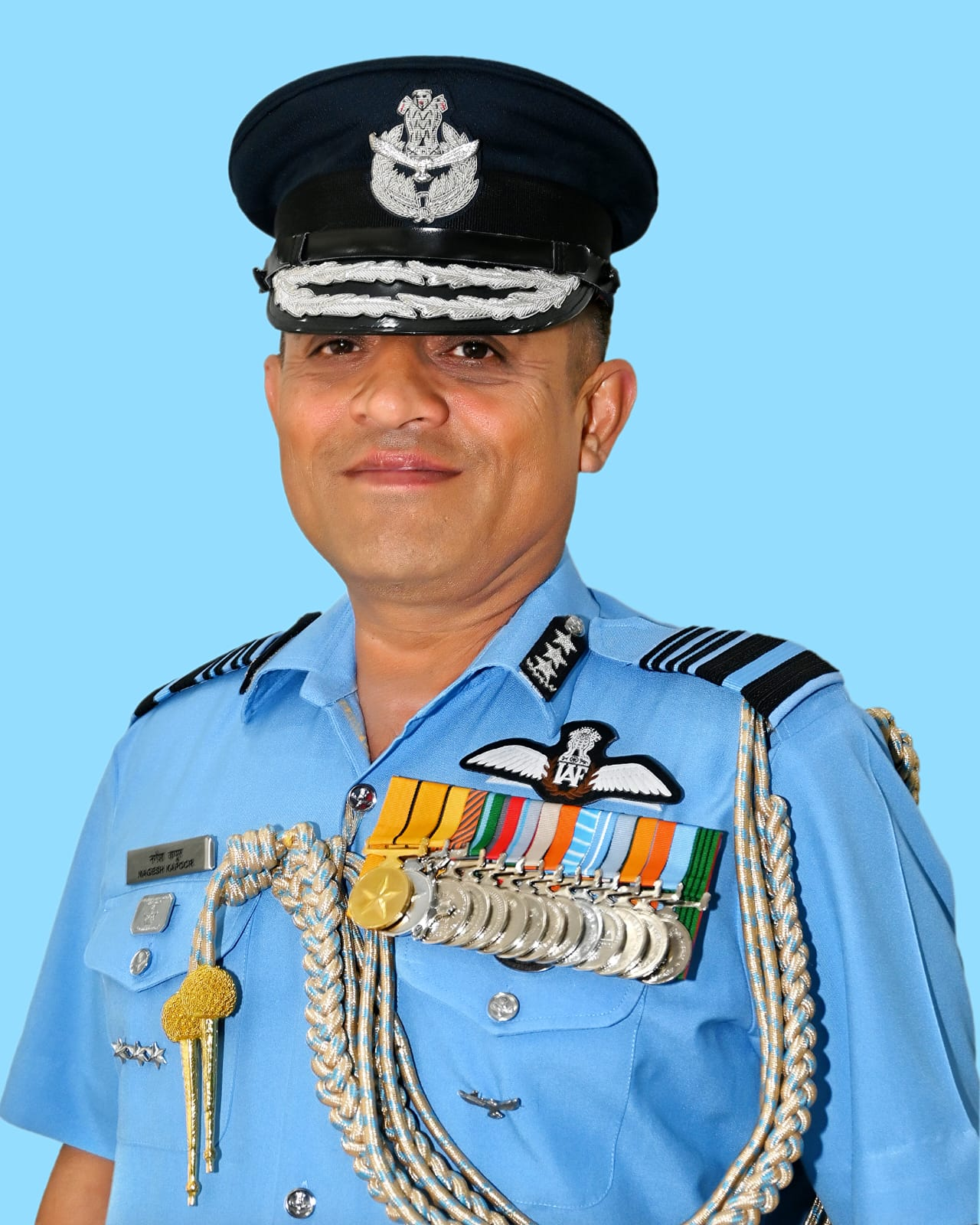

50th Vice Chief of the Air Staff
- In office 1 January 2026 – 30 June 2026
- Chief of Air Staff: Amar Preet Singh
- Preceded by: Narmdeshwar Tiwari
- Succeeded by: Ashutosh Dixit

Air Officer Commanding-in-Chief South Western Air Command
- In office 1 May 2025 – 31 December 2025
- Chief of Air Staff: Amar Preet Singh
- Preceded by: Narmdeshwar Tiwari
- Succeeded by: Tejinder Singh

Air Officer Commanding-in-Chief Training Command
- In office 1 May 2024 – 30 April 2025
- Preceded by: Radhakrishnan Radhish
- Succeeded by: Tejinder Singh

Military service
- Allegiance: India
- Branch/service: Indian Air Force
- Years of service: 6 December 1986 – 30 June 2026
- Rank: Air Marshal
- Unit: No. 35 Squadron
- Commands: South Western Air Command; Training Command; Composite Battle Response and Analysis Group; 2 Air Defence Control Centre; 28 Wing; 27 Wing; No. 35 Squadron
- Service number: 18557
- Awards: Sarvottam Yudh Seva Medal; Param Vishisht Seva Medal; Ati Vishisht Seva Medal; Vayu Sena Medal

Air Marshal Nagesh Kapoor, SYSM, PVSM, AVSM, VM is a retired air officer of the Indian Air Force. He last served as the 50th Vice Chief of the Air Staff. He previously served as the Air Officer Commanding-in-Chief, South Western Air Command, and prior to that he served as the Air Officer Commanding-in-Chief, Training Command. He earlier served as the Air Officer-in-Charge Personnel and as the Senior Air Staff Officer, Central Air Command. He is currently the director general of Centre for Aerospace Power and Strategic Studies (CAPSS), a prominent think tank in New Delhi.

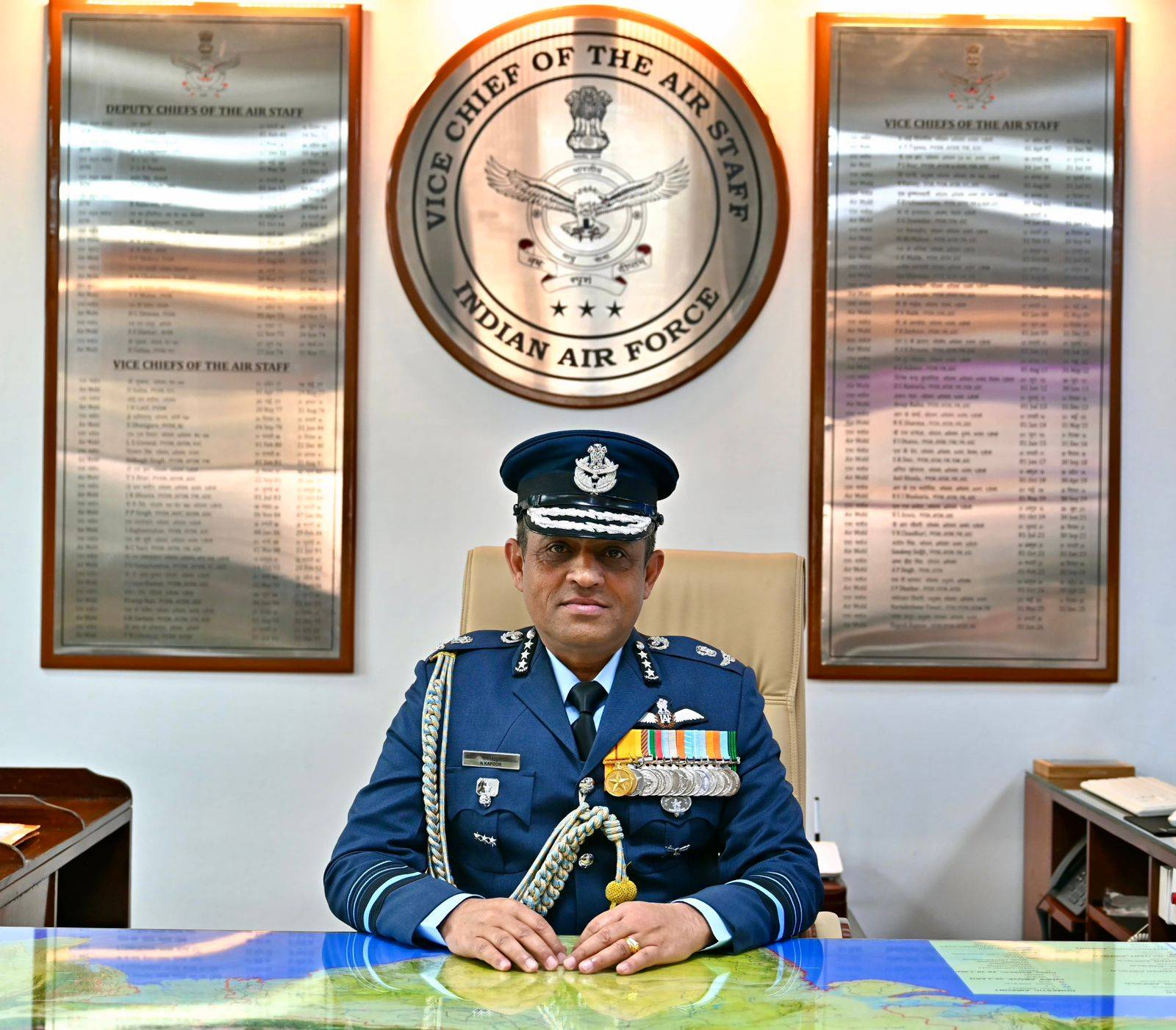
Air Marshal Nagesh Kapoor as the Vice Chief of the Air Staff

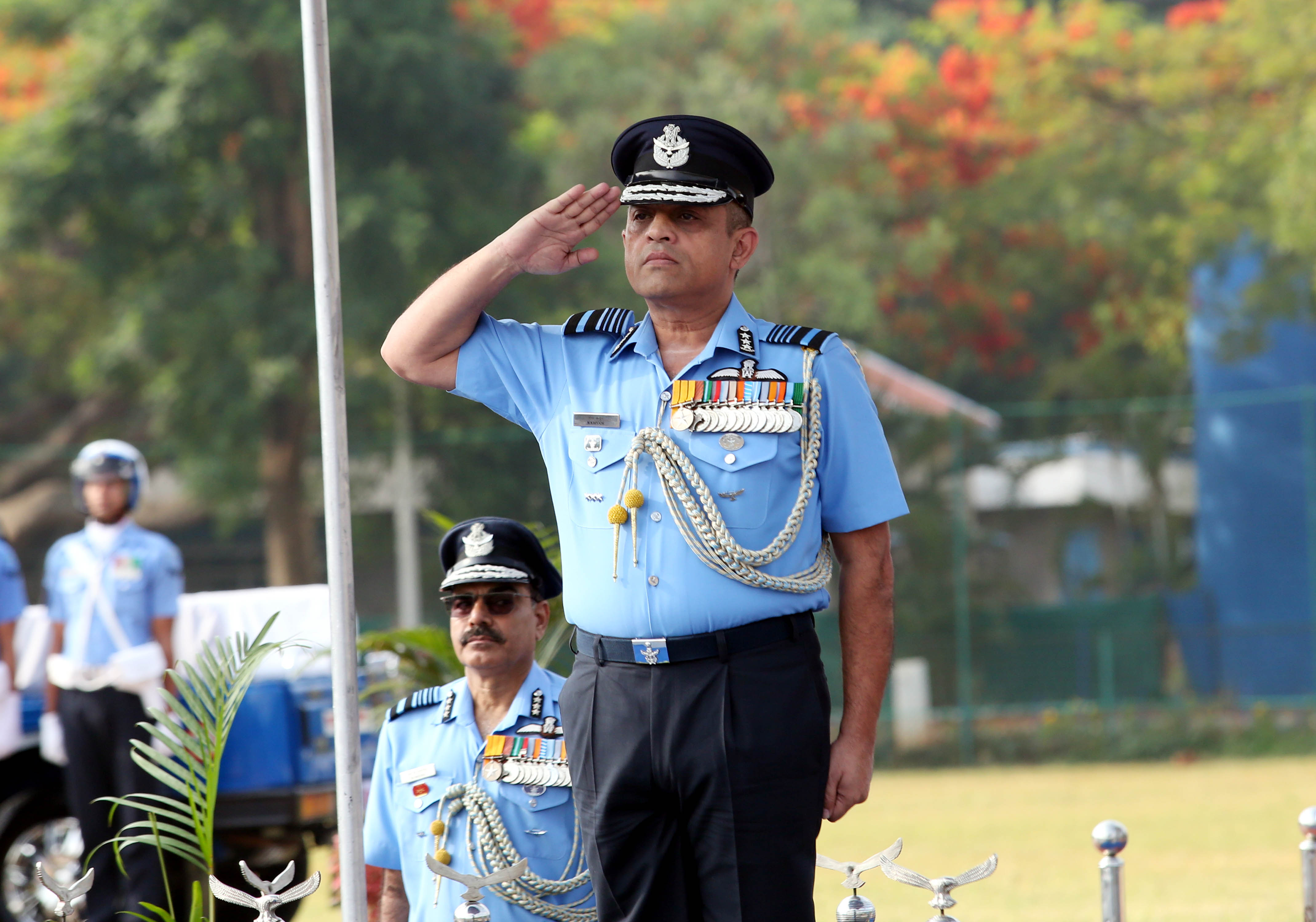
Air Marshal Nagesh Kapoor assuming charge as the Air Officer Commanding-in-Chief, Training Command

== Early life and education ==
The Air officer is an alumnus of the National Defence Academy, Khadakwasla and the Air Force Academy, Dundigal. He is also an alumnus of the Defence Services Staff College, Wellington and the National Defence College, New Delhi.

== Military career ==
He was commissioned into the fighter stream of the Indian Air Force on 6 December 1986 from the Air Force Academy. In a career spanning over three decades, he has more than 3400 hours of flying experience across various fighter jets and has held numerous field & instructional appointments. He is a highly experienced fighter pilot, qualified flying instructor and a fighter combat leader who has flown a variety of combat and trainer aircraft and has flown all variants of MiG-21 and the MiG-29. The Air Marshal's operational tenures include being the Commanding Officer of a fighter squadron in the Central Sector, Station Commander of a flying base in the Western Sector and Air Officer Commanding of a premier air base. He has done instructional tenures as Chief Instructor (Flying) at Air Force Academy and Directing Staff at the Defence Services Staff College, Wellington. During his tenure at Air Force Academy, the Air Officer was instrumental in the induction and operationalisation of PC-7 MK Il aircraft in the IAF. He has also undertaken a diplomatic assignment as Defence Attaché, Pakistan.

As an Air Vice Marshal, he served as the Assistant Chief of Air Staff (Ops, Strategy) at the Air headquarters, New Delhi, as the Air Officer Commanding of 2 Air Defence Control Centre at Gandhinagar and as the Air Officer Commanding of the Composite Battle Response and Analysis Group.

After being promoted to the rank of Air Marshal, he was appointed as the Senior Air Staff Officer of the Central Air Command at Prayagraj. A year later on 1 September 2023, he took over as the Air Officer-in-Charge Personnel. On 1 May 2024, Air Marshal Nagesh Kapoor took over as the Air Officer Commanding-in-Chief, Training Command. A year later, on 1 May 2025, he took over as the Air Officer Commanding-in-Chief, South Western Air Command succeeding Air Marshal Narmdeshwar Tiwari who moved to the Air Headquarters as the Vice Chief of the Air Staff. He relinquished the command of South Western Air Command on 31 December 2025.

On 1 January 2026, Air Marshal Nagesh Kapoor took over as the 50th Vice Chief of the Air Staff succeeding Air Marshal Narmdeshwar Tiwari when the latter superannuated on 31 December 2025.

== Awards and decorations ==
During his career, the air marshal has been awarded the Sarvottam Yudh Seva Medal on Independence Day 2025 for his role during Operation Sindoor, the Param Vishisht Seva Medal on Republic Day 2025, the Ati Vishisht Seva Medal in 2022 and the Vayu Sena Medal in 2008.

Sarvottam Yudh Seva Medal	Param Vishisht Seva Medal	Ati Vishisht Seva Medal	Vayu Sena Medal
Samanya Seva Medal	Special Service Medal	Operation Vijay Medal	Operation Parakram Medal
Sainya Seva Medal	High Altitude Medal	Videsh Seva Medal	75th Independence Anniversary Medal
50th Independence Anniversary Medal	30 Years Long Service Medal	20 Years Long Service Medal	9 Years Long Service Medal

== Dates of ranks ==
Insignia	Rank	Component	Date of rank
	Pilot Officer	Indian Air Force	6 December 1986
	Flying Officer	Indian Air Force	6 December 1987
	Flight Lieutenant	Indian Air Force	6 December 1991
	Squadron Leader	Indian Air Force	6 December 1997
	Wing Commander	Indian Air Force	5 May 2003
	Group Captain	Indian Air Force	1 March 2009
	Air Commodore	Indian Air Force	17 June 2013
	Air Vice Marshal	Indian Air Force	11 June 2019
	Air Marshal	Indian Air Force	22 August 2022

== Post-retirement ==
After retirement from IAF, Kapoor took over as the director general of Centre for Aerospace Power and Strategic Studies (CAPSS), a think tank in New Delhi.

Military offices
Preceded by Narmdeshwar Tiwari	Vice Chief of Air Staff; 1 January 2026 – 30 June 2026	Succeeded by Ashutosh Dixit
Preceded by Narmdeshwar Tiwari	Air Officer Commanding-in-Chief; South Western Air Command; 1 May 2025 – 31 December 2025	Succeeded by Tejinder Singh
Preceded by Radhakrishnan Radhish	Air Officer Commanding-in-Chief; Training Command; 1 May 2024 – 30 April 2025	Succeeded by Tejinder Singh
Preceded by Suraj Kumar Jha	Air Officer-in-Charge Personnel; 1 September 2023 - 30 April 2024	Succeeded by Sunil Kashinath Vidhate
Preceded by Ravi Gopal Krishana Kapoor	Senior Air Staff Officer; Central Air Command; 22 August 2022 – 31 August 2023	Succeeded by Awadhesh Kumar Bharti
