= Bapora =

- Village
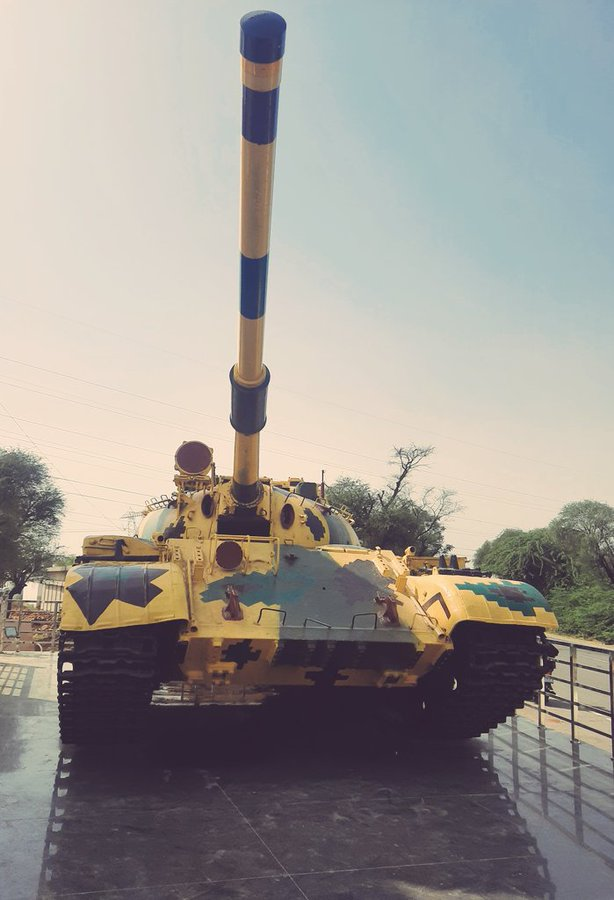
- T-55 tank at Bapora

- Location in Haryana, India Bapora (India)
- Coordinates: 28.815°N 76.063°E
- Country: India
- State: Haryana
- District: Bhiwani
- Mandal: Bhiwani
- Founder: Thakur Jagsi Singh

Government
  - Body: Village panchayat

Population (2011)
  - Total: 35,000

Languages
  - Official: Haryanvi
- Time zone: UTC+5:30 (IST)

Bapora is a village in the Bhiwani district of the Indian state of Haryana. It lies approximately 7 kilometres (4.3 mi) west of the district headquarters town of Bhiwani. As of the 2011 Census of India, the village had 1,657 households with a total population of 34,332 of which 17,651 were male and 16,681 female. The major population of area is Rajput.For political representational purposes the village is part of Tosham Assembly constituency and the Bhiwani-Mahendragarh Lok Sabha constituency.

== History ==
Thikana of Bapora was founded by rajput Named Baba jagsi singh tanwar Thakur Jagsi Ram Singhji came to this place together and then founded this Village Bapora. Thakur Jagsi Ram Singh is also known as Baba Jagsi. Baba Jagsi was great-great-great grandson of Rao Raja Jatmal Singhji (also known as Jatuji) who came from Patan to rule the present-day areas of southern Haryana (Bhiwani-Mahendragrah and some area of Hisar). The descendants of Rao Jatuji are known as the Jatu Tanwar. They have ruled over 1440 villages in their times

== Battle of Bapora ==
A battle was fought at Bapora with a locally famous Nawab Mulla Farid Ladai in the 17th century. Nawab's army was twice or thrice times bigger than the Rajputs of Bapora, but the Rajputs of Bapora bravely fought and won that battle. A nagada is kept in the Shivala Mandir, near Government Primary School of Bapora, which was used in that battle. General V.K. Singh describes his village in his autobiography as given below -

There's something incredibly romantic about Bapora, the village where the present Chief of Army Staff, Gen. Vijay Kumar Singh, was born, spent his childhood, and still has a home,

It might be Bapora's location, on the far side of the town of Bhiwani in Haryana (famed for its prize-winning boxers), on the fringe of the Thar Desert. It could be the dusty lanes that wind past big old houses, including havelis, some of them now abandoned and sunk a foot or more below the surface. It could be Bapora's age, which is approaching 700 years. It could be the legends that surround its foundation, studded with sadhus and Rajput kings. It could be Totawala Baba, an ash-covered sadhu who has just begun his rigorous summer schedule of tapasya at the big Shiv Mandir near the government school. It could be the tang of steel in the air, owed not just to the presence of hundreds of retired servicemen here (and generations of soldiers before them) but also to the historical memory of the locally famous Mulla-Nawab Ladai, when stolen taxes (carried, the elders say, on three camels and two horses) led a nearby nawab to wage bloody war against Bapora in the 16th century.

— (Singh 2005, pp. 6–17)

== Antiquities of attraction ==
=== Bapora Waterworks ===
The water works outside the village that was set up in 1969 with World Bank funds to provide clean water to 184 villages (but now serves just a handful). World bank Chairman paid a visit village Bapora in those times. A special helipad was constructed for him temporarily. BR Farm House based in Bapora one of best organic farm.

=== T-55 Tank ===
A retired T-55 tank was inaugurated by General VK Singh at Bapora on village's entry gate. The tank was in operation during 1971 Indo-Pakistani war. In past many of military personnel from Bapora were recruited in either cavalry or armoured regiments. Most of them were in 1st Horse (Skinner's Horse) and 17th Horse (Poona Horse), but in present most of youth from village is recruited into Infantry regiments. General VK Singh in his inauguration speech at Bapora said that this tank at Bapora would motivate the youth and remarks the glorious services of veterans of Bapora who were in cavalry.

== Notable individuals ==
=== Public Figures ===
- General V.K. Singh PVSM, AVSM, YSM, former Chief of the Army Staff. and Minister of State in the Union Government of India.

=== Armed Forces of India ===
- Air Marshal Prithi Singh PVSM, AVSM, VM & Bar, former AOC-in-C Western Air Command. He had piloted most number of aircraft (more than 102+) in Indian Air Force. Both his son, Air Marshal Vikram Singh and his son-in-law, Air Marshal Sandeep Singh rose to ranks of Air Marshal (Commander-in-Chief & Vice Chief of Air Staff respectively).
- Air Marshal Vikram Singh AVSM, VSM, former AOC-in-C South-Western Air Command.
- Colonel Brijpal Singh, recipient of Vir Chakra during1947-48 Indo-Pakistani War. After retirement he joined new established Border Security Force as DIG and served until June 1972. He was a well known personality of his time, and had so much influence that his bungalow in his village became the center for recruitment for the newly established Border Security Force in his times.
- Rifleman Mathan Singh, recipient of Vir Chakra during Indo-Pakistani war of 1965. During a counter-attack on the enemy on the bridge over the river Ravi near Dera Baba Nanak Sector, Rifleman Mathan Singh was the leader of an LMG unit in one of the sections of Rajputana Rifles. After the battalion had captured its objective, the portion which Rifleman Mathan Singh's section was holding was severely counter-attacked by the enemy Rifleman Mathan Singh bore the brunt of this attack and kept the enemy at bay. He was severely wounded, but did not leave his gun. When the enemy force attacked again, Rifleman Mathan Singh prevented it from advancing. When the enemy retreated, Rifleman Mathan Singh was found dead with his gun still to his shoulder.
- Brigadier Veerpal Singh

=== Paramilitary Forces of India ===
- DIG S.P.S Tanwar, recipient of President Police Medal for Distinguished and Meritorious Services. He is credited for inspiring youth of his village to join Indian Armed Forces. By his efforts the village Bapora came to known as 'Bapora Security Force' a.k.a. 'The Mini BSF' or the BSF of Haryana.
- DIG Vijender Pal Singh Tanwar, recipient of Sena Medal (gallantry) 1971 Bangladesh Liberation War. He joined the 11 Rajputana Rifles (RajRif) in 1963 as an Emergency Commissioned officer. After completing 5 years in the Army, he joined the BSF in 1968. In 1971, he was 2IC of 18 Bn BSF (Commando) and operated with Mukti Bahini on the eastern front prior to the commencement of the formal war. After the declaration of war, 18 Bn was deployed in the Jaiselmer sector, where it captured some Pak territory and remained at Islamgarh till the Shimla Agreement in 1972. For his bravery and exemplary leadership on the eastern front, he was awarded the Sena Medal for gallantry. He retired from BSF in the year 2000 as DIG.
- Commandant Bhim Singh Tanwar, recipient of President Police Medal for Meritorious Services

=== Martyers ===
- Shaheed Mathan Singh, VrC
- Shaheed Girvar Singh
- Shaheed Pratap Singh
- Shaheed Sanajy Singh
- Shaheed Surajpal Singh
- Shaheed Kehar Singh
- Shaheed Bhanwar Singh
- Shaheed Rajendra Singh
- Shaheed Chandrabhan Singh
- Shaheed Dafedar Ram Kumar

=== British Awards ===
- Sardar Bahadur Captain Umda Singh, Member of Royal Victorian Order and Aide-de-camp (ADC) to King of United Kingdom Edward VII during his time. Later, he remained Magistrate of Tehsil Bhiwani.
- Rao Bahadur Lieutenant Thakur Sukhpal Singh, recipient of Indian Distinguished Service Medal and administrator at Bhaji State. He had actively fought in both World Wars I and II.

== In Media ==
=== Armed Forces of India ===
- Bapora girl does Haryana proud
- Bapora, Haryana's Subedar Bir Singh Tanwar. both of his sons and daughter got commission in our Air Force .
- केंद्रीय मंत्री वीके सिंह के पैतृक गांव बापोड़ा का लाडला बना लेफ्टिनेंट
- भीम सिंह तंवर का राष्ट्रपति पुलिस पदक के लिए हुआ चयन
- वायुसेना उप प्रमुख एयर मार्शल संदीप सिंह का बापोड़ा से क्या सम्बंध ?

=== Events ===
- New Army Chief Bapora's crowning glory
- The General goes home
