= Ravi Gopal Krishana Kapoor =

Retired officer of the Indian Air Force

Air Marshal Ravi Gopal Krishana Kapoor PVSM AVSM VM
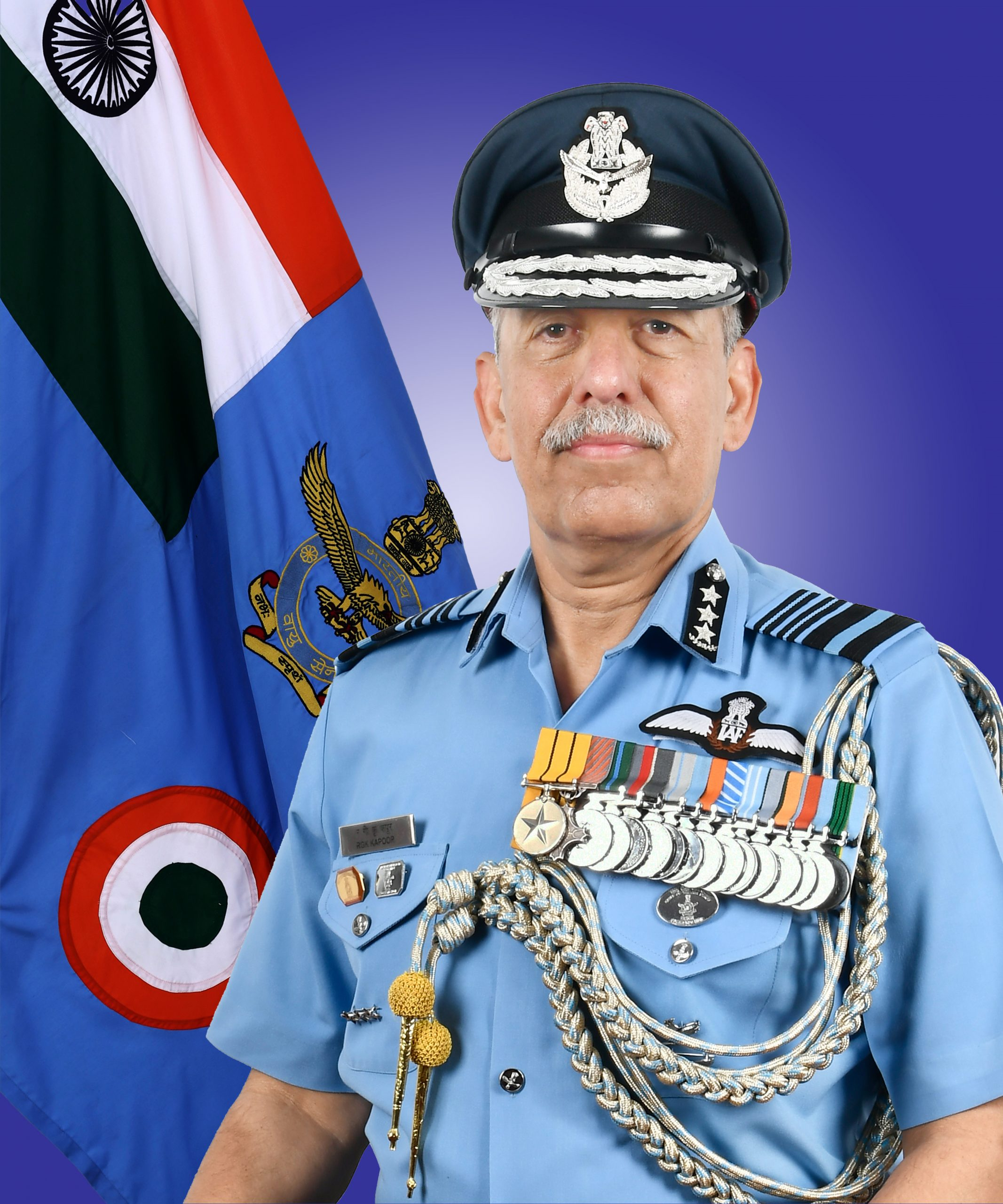

Personal details
- Awards: Param Vishisht Seva Medal; Ati Vishisht Seva Medal; Vayu Sena Medal

Military service
- Allegiance: India
- Branch/service: Indian Air Force
- Years of service: 7 June 1986 – 31 August 2024
- Rank: Air Marshal
- Unit: No. 15 Squadron
- Commands: Central Air Command
- Service number: 18253

Air Marshal Ravi Gopal Krishana Kapoor, PVSM, AVSM, VM is a retired officer of the Indian Air Force. He is served as the Air Officer Commanding-in-Chief (AOC-in-C), Central Air Command. He assumed the office on 1 February 2023 succeeding Air Marshal Amar Preet Singh and superannuated on 31 August 2024. He was succeeded by Air Marshal Ashutosh Dixit.

== Early life and education ==
Ravi Gopal Krishana Kapoor is an alumnus of the prestigious Defence Services Staff College, Wellington and College of Air Warfare, Secunderabad.

== Career ==
Ravi Gopal Krishana Kapoor was commissioned as the fighter pilot in the Indian Air Force. In a career spanning over 37 years, he has as more than 5,000 hours of flying experience across full gamut of fighter aircraft of the Indian Air Force.

He is a Cat ‘A’ qualified flying instructor and served as the Chief Flying Instructor at Air Force Academy, Dundigal. He served as the commanding officer of MiG Operational Flying Training Unit - MOFTU and commanded the Indian Air Force contingent at UN Mission in Congo.

As Air Commodore, he served as the Air Officer Commanding of 9 Wing at AFS Halwar in the Western sector and later as Air Attaché in the Indian Embassy at Washington, USA.

As Air Vice Marshal, he served as the Assistant Chief of Air Staff, Intelligence at New Delhi. During the 2019 India–Pakistan border skirmishes, he presented the evidence of F-16 usage by Pakistan Air Force and subsequent shoot down of the same by the Indian Air Force MiG-21. However, US count of PAF's F-16 fleet and Independent media reports confirmed that no F-16 was shot down during aerial dogfight between IAF and PAF. According to The National Bureau of Asian Research, such claims of an F-16 being shot down by India are said to be "debunked".

Later, he served as the Air Defense Commander Central Air Command.

After his promotion to Air Marshal, he served as the Senior Air Staff Officer, Central Air Command and later as the Deputy Commander-in-Chief at Strategic Forces Command.

He took over as the Air Officer Commanding-in-Chief, Central Air Command on 1 February 2023 from Air Marshal Amar Preet Singh on his elevation to Vice Chief of Air Staff.

== Honours and decorations ==
During his career, Ravi Gopal Krishana Kapoor has received the Commendation by the Chief of the Air Staff twice and has been awarded the Param Vishisht Seva Medal in 2024, Ati Vishisht Seva Medal in 2022 and VM in 2006 for his service.

Param Vishisht Seva Medal	Ati Vishisht Seva Medal	Vayu Sena Medal

Military offices
Preceded by Amar Preet Singh	Air Officer Commanding-in-Chief, Central Air Command; 1 February 2023 – 31 August 2024	Succeeded by Ashutosh Dixit
Preceded by Post Established	Deputy Commander-in-Chief - Strategic Forces Command; 1 April 2022 – 31 January 2023	Succeeded by Rakesh Sinha
Preceded by Dilip Kumar Patnaik	Senior Air Staff Officer - Central Air Command; 26 October 2021 – 31 March 2022	Succeeded by Nagesh Kapoor
