= Narmdeshwar Tiwari =

Former Vice Chief of Air Staff

Air Marshal Narmdeshwar Tiwari SYSM PVSM AVSM VM
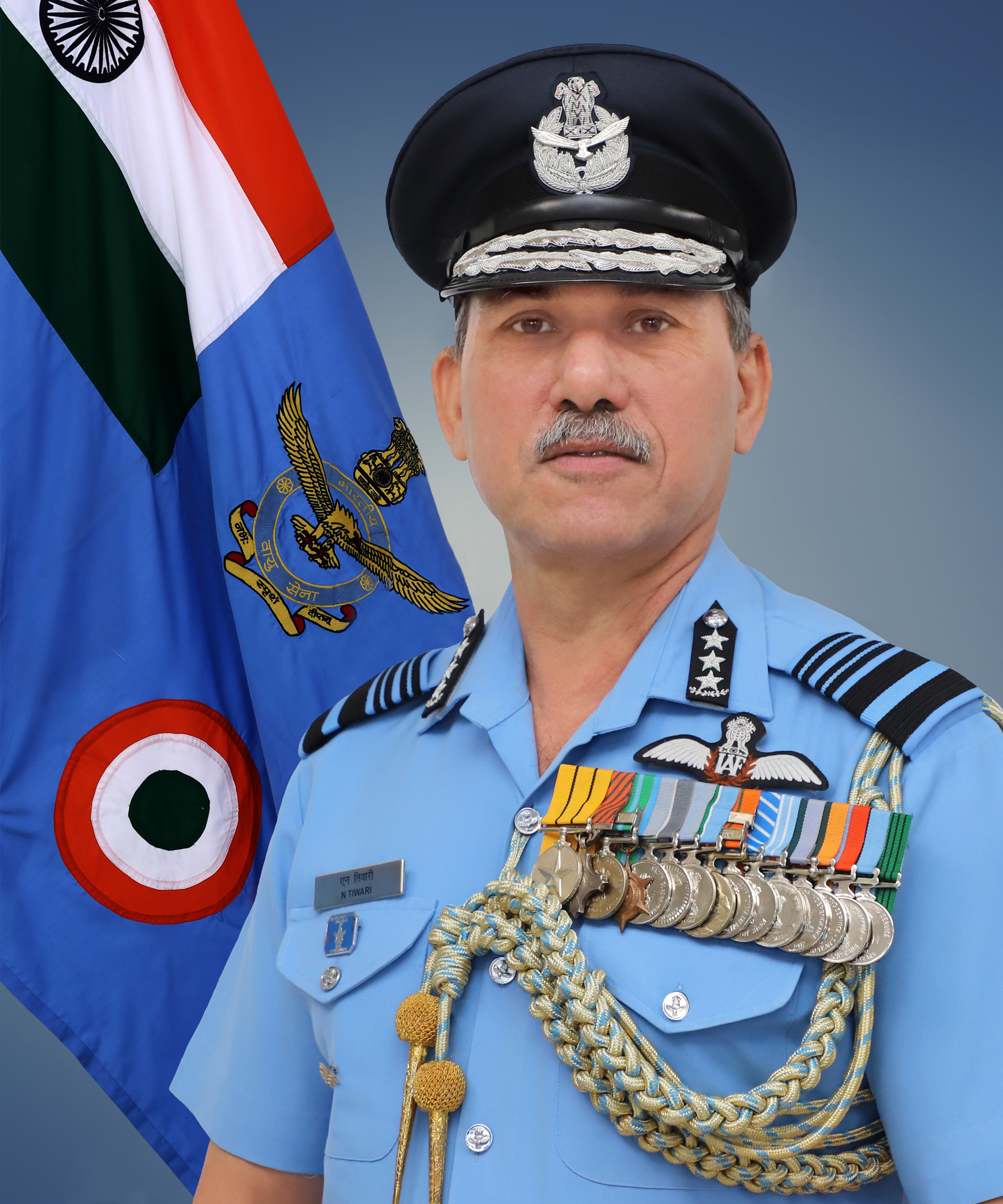

49th Vice Chief of the Air Staff
- In office 2 May 2025 – 31 December 2025
- Chief of Air Staff: Amar Preet Singh
- Preceded by: Sujeet Pushpakar Dharkar
- Succeeded by: Nagesh Kapoor

Air Officer Commanding-in-Chief South Western Air Command
- In office 1 May 2023 – 30 April 2025
- Chief of Air Staff: Vivek Ram Chaudhari; Amar Preet Singh
- Preceded by: Vikram Singh
- Succeeded by: Nagesh Kapoor

Deputy Chief of the Air Staff
- In office 1 October 2021 – 30 April 2023
- Preceded by: Suraj Kumar Jha
- Succeeded by: Ashutosh Dixit

Personal details
- Born: Sikalpur, Siwan, Bihar
- Education: Rashtriya Indian Military College

Military service
- Allegiance: India
- Branch/service: Indian Air Force
- Years of service: 7 June 1986 – 31 December 2025
- Rank: Air Marshal
- Unit: No. 1 Squadron
- Commands: South Western Air Command; 32 Wing; 5 Forward Base Support Unit; No. 1 Squadron
- Battles/wars: Kargil War
- Service number: 18270
- Awards: Sarvottam Yudh Seva Medal; Param Vishisht Seva Medal; Ati Vishisht Seva Medal; Vayu Sena Medal

Air Marshal Narmdeshwar Tiwari, SYSM, PVSM, AVSM, VM is a retired officer of the Indian Air Force. He last served as the Vice Chief of the Air Staff. He was previously serving as the Air Officer Commanding-in-Chief, South Western Air Command, prior to that he was the Deputy Chief of the Air Staff.

== Early life and education ==
The Air officer was born in Siakalpur, Siwan, Bihar. He is an alumnus of the Rashtriya Indian Military College, Dehradun, the National Defence Academy, Khadakwasla and the Air Force Academy. In National Defence Academy, he was awarded the President's Gold Medal. The Air marshal is also an alumnus of the National Defence College, New Delhi and the Air Command and Staff College, USA.

== Military career ==
He was commissioned as a fighter pilot in the Indian Air Force on 7 Jun 1986 from the Air Force Academy. In a career spanning over 37 years, he has more than 3,600 hours of flying experience across various fighter jets. He is a qualified flying instructor and experimental test pilot and has extensive weapons testing experience primarily on Mirage 2000. He played a key role in operationalising the ‘Litening’ laser designation pod during the Kargil Operations in 1999. As a Wing Commander, he served as the commanding officer of No. 1 Squadron and has been instrumental in test flying HAL Tejas. Upon his promotion to the rank of Group Captain, the air officer served as the chief test pilot at Aircraft and Systems Testing Establishment (ASTE) and was instrumental in flight testing various aircraft of the Indian Air Force including HAL Tejas.

On getting promoted as Air Commodore, he served as the Air Attaché at the Embassy of India in France from 2013 to 2016 and later served as the Air Officer Commanding of 32 Wing at the Jodhpur sector in the South Western Air Command.

As Air Vice Marshal, he served as the Project Director at National Flight Test Center, Aeronautical Development Agency at Bangalore. Later, he served as the Assistance Chief of Air Staff (Projects) and Assistance Chief of Air Staff (Plans), spearheading the acquisition and plans for the Indian Air Force.

After his promotion to the rank of Air Marshal, on 1 October 2021 the Air officer took over as the Deputy Chief of the Air Staff at the Air Headquarters, New Delhi. On 1 May 2023, Air Marshal Narmdeshwar Tiwari took over as the Air Officer Commanding-in-Chief, South Western Air Command succeeding Air Marshal Vikram Singh.

On 2 May 2025, Air Marshal Narmdeshwar Tiwari took over as the 49th Vice Chief of the Air Staff succeeding Air Marshal Sujeet Pushpakar Dharkar, who superannuated on 30 April 2025. The Air officer superannuated on 31 December 2025.

== Awards and decorations ==
During his career, the air marshal has been awarded the Sarvottam Yudh Seva Medal on Independence Day 2025 for his role in Operation Sindoor, the Param Vishisht Seva Medal on Republic Day 2025, the Ati Vishisht Seva Medal in 2022 and the Vayu Sena Medal in 2008 for his service.

Sarvottam Yudh Seva Medal		Param Vishisht Seva Medal	
Ati Vishisht Seva Medal	Vayu Sena Medal		Samanya Seva Medal
Operation Vijay Star	Siachen Glacier Medal	Operation Vijay Medal	Operation Parakram Medal
Sainya Seva Medal	High Altitude Medal	Videsh Seva Medal	75th Anniversary of Independence Medal
50th Independence Anniversary Medal	30 Years Long Service Medal	20 Years Long Service Medal	9 Years Long Service Medal

== Dates of rank ==
Insignia	Rank	Component	Date of rank
	Pilot Officer	Indian Air Force	7 June 1986
	Flying Officer	Indian Air Force	7 June1987
	Flight Lieutenant	Indian Air Force	7 June 1991
	Squadron Leader	Indian Air Force	7 June 1997
	Wing Commander	Indian Air Force	5 May 2003
	Group Captain	Indian Air Force	3 November 2008
	Air Commodore	Indian Air Force	24 September 2012
	Air Vice Marshal	Indian Air Force	1 October 2018
	Air Marshal	Indian Air Force	1 October 2021 (AOC-in-C from 1 May 2023)

Military offices
Preceded by Sujeet Pushpakar Dharkar	Vice Chief of Air Staff; 1 May 2025 – 31 December 2025	Succeeded by Nagesh Kapoor
Preceded by Vikram Singh	Air Officer Commanding-in-Chief; South Western Air Command; 1 May 2023 – 30 April 2025	Succeeded by Nagesh Kapoor
Preceded by Suraj Kumar Jha	Deputy Chief of the Air Staff; 1 October 2021 – 30 April 2023	Succeeded by Ashutosh Dixit
