= Radhakrishnan Radhish =

Indian Air Force officer

Air Marshal Radhakrishnan Radhish PVSM AVSM VM
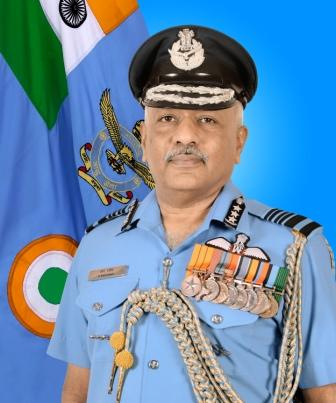

Personal details
- Awards: Param Vishisht Seva Medal; Ati Vishisht Seva Medal; Vayu Sena Medal

Military service
- Allegiance: India
- Branch/service: Indian Air Force
- Years of service: 14 June 1985 – 30 April 2024
- Rank: Air Marshal
- Unit: No. 224 Squadron
- Commands: Training Command
- Service number: 17853

Air Marshal Radhakrishnan Radhish, PVSM, AVSM, VM is a retired officer of the Indian Air Force. He served as the Air Officer Commanding-in-Chief (AOC-in-C), Training Command. He assumed the office on 1 January 2023 succeeding Air Marshal Manavendra Singh.

== Early life and education ==
Radhakrishnan Radhish is an alumnus of Sainik School, Kazhakootam and National Defence Academy. He was commissioned in the fighter stream on 14 June 1985. He is a graduate of the Joint Services Command and Staff College, Shrivenham, UK and the Royal College of Defence Studies, London, UK.

== Career ==
Radhakrishnan Radhish was commissioned as the fighter pilot in the Indian Air Force. In a career spanning over 38 years, he has as close to 2,500 hours on various aircraft including MiG-23 and MiG-27.

He served as a Fighter Strike Leader and Instrument Rating Instructor and Examiner. He has served as the Commanding officer of No. 224 Squadron. He has also served as the Station Commander of the Signal unit, 507 Signal Unit in Jharkhand and Air Officer Commanding of 5 Wing both in the Eastern Sector.

As an Air Vice Marshal, he served as the Commandant of the College of Air Warfare, Secunderabad and later served as the Air Defense Commander at Central Air Command.

Prior to his appointment as AOC-in-C, Training command, he served as Senior Air Staff Officer of the Western Air Command.

== Honours and decorations ==
During his career, Radhakrishnan Radhish has been awarded the Param Vishisht Seva Medal in 2024, the Ati Vishisht Seva Medal in 2013 and the Vayu Sena Medal in 2006 for his service.

| Param Vishisht Seva Medal | Ati Vishisht Seva Medal | Vayu Sena Medal |

== Personal life ==
He is married to Mrs Hyacinth May Radhish and the couple is blessed with two children.

Military offices
| Preceded by Manavendra Singh | Air Officer Commanding-in-Chief, Training Command; 1 January 2023 – 30 April 2024 | Succeeded by Nagesh Kapoor |
| Preceded by Vikram Singh | Senior Air Staff Officer - Western Air Command; 26 October 2021 – 31 December 2022 | Succeeded by Makarand Ranade |
