= Mehtab Singh Deswal =

Air Marshal in the Indian Air Force

Air Marshal Mehtab Singh Deswal AVSM VM

Air Officer Commanding-in-Chief Western Air Command
- Incumbent
- Assumed office 1 November 2026
- Chief of Air Staff: Ashutosh Dixit
- Preceded by: Inderpal Singh Walia

Military service
- Allegiance: India
- Branch/service: Indian Air Force
- Years of service: 14 June 1989 - Present
- Rank: Air Marshal
- Unit: No. 8 Squadron
- Commands: Eastern Air Command; 33 Wing; 45 Wing; No. 8 Squadron
- Service Number: 20131
- Awards: Ati Vishisht Seva Medal; Vayu Sena Medal

Air Marshal Mehtab Singh Deswal, AVSM, VM is a serving air officer of the Indian Air Force. He is currently serving as the Air Officer Commanding-in-Chief, Eastern Air Command. He was previously serving as the Senior Air Staff Officer, South Western Air Command, prior to that he was the Director General of Weapon Systems.

== Early life and education ==
The air officer is an alumnus of the 74th Course of the National Defence Academy, Khadakwasla and the Air Force Academy, Dundigal. He is also an alumnus of National Defence College, New Delhi.

== Military career ==
He was commissioned into the fighter stream of the Indian Air Force on 14 June 1989 from the Air Force Academy. In a career spanning over three decades, he has over 3200 hours of flying experience across various fighter jets and has held various command & staff appointments. He is a specialist in strike aircraft and air defence roles and a qualified Pilot Attack Instructor. The air marshal's operational tenures include being the Commanding Officer of No. 8 Squadron (Eight Pursoots). He has also undertaken a diplomatic assignment as Defence Attaché, Pakistan.

As an Air Commodore, he served as the Air Officer Commanding of No. 45 Wing (Sirsa Air Force Station) and later as the Air Officer Commanding of No. 33 Wing at Jamnagar. As an Air Vice Marshal, he served as the Assistant Chief of Air Staff, Inspection at the Air headquarters and as the Chief Staff Officer (Air Vector Strategy) at Strategic Forces Command.

On getting promoted to the rank of Air Marshal, he assumed the appointment of Director General of Weapon Systems on 1 June 2025. After his stint as DG WS, on 1 January 2026, he assumed the appointment of Senior Air Staff Officer, South Western Air Command. On 1 November 2026, Air Marshal Mehtab Deswal took over as Air Officer Commanding-in-Chief, Eastern Air Command succeeding Air Marshal Inderpal Singh Walia, upon latter's elevation as the Vice Chief of the Air Staff.

== Awards and decorations ==
During his career, he has been awarded with the Ati Vishisht Seva Medal in 2026 and the Vayu Sena Medal in 2011.

Ati Vishisht Seva Medal		Vayu Sena Medal	
Special Service Medal	Operation Vijay Medal		Operation Parakram Medal
Sainya Seva Medal	High Altitude Medal	Videsh Seva Medal	75th Independence Anniversary Medal
50th Independence Anniversary Medal	30 Years Long Service Medal	20 Years Long Service Medal	9 Years Long Service Medal

== Date of ranks ==
Insignia	Rank	Component	Date of rank
	Pilot Officer	Indian Air Force	14 June 1989
	Flying Officer	Indian Air Force	14 June 1990
	Flight Lieutenant	Indian Air Force	14 June 1994
	Squadron Leader	Indian Air Force	14 June 1996
	Wing Commander	Indian Air Force	16 December 2004
	Group Captain	Indian Air Force	1 February 2011
	Air Commodore	Indian Air Force	1 October 2017
	Air Vice Marshal	Indian Air Force	29 August 2022
	Air Marshal	Indian Air Force	1 June 2025
