= Prithi Singh =

Indian Air Force officer (1934-2012)

Air Marshal Prithi Singh PVSM, AVSM, VM**, ADC
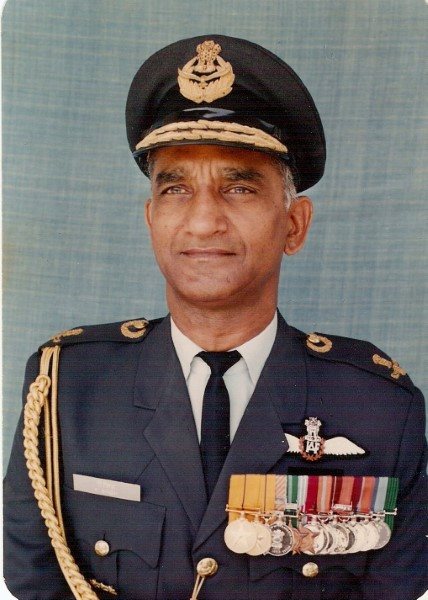
- Born: 9 April 1934; Bapora, Haryana, India
- Died: 16 October 2012 (aged 78)
- Alma mater: Mayo College; National Defence College (India); Empire Test Pilots' School. UK; Flying Instructors School (India)
- Children: Air Marshal Vikram Singh (son)
- Relatives: Air Marshal Sandeep Singh (son-in-law)
- Military career
- Allegiance: India
- Branch: Indian Air Force
- Service years: 1 April 1953 - 30 April 1992
- Rank: Air Marshal
- Service number: 4480
- Unit: No. 101 Squadron IAF
- Commands: No. 101 Squadron IAF; Western Air Command; Deputy Chief of Air Staff
- Awards: Param Vishisht Seva Medal; Ati Vishisht Seva Medal; Vayu Sena Medal (Bar); Vayu Sena Medal

Air Marshal Prithi Singh PVSM, AVSM, VM & Bar, ADC was an officer of the Indian Air Force. He served as Air Officer Commanding in Chief (AOC-in-C), Western Air Command from 1 August 1988 to 30 April 1992. During his 40 years in the Indian Air Force, Singh flew about 102 different types of aircraft and their 120+ versions setting a record in IAF of flying most number of aircraft.

== Early life ==
He was born into the Tanwar clan of Rajputs, with roots in the Bapora village in the Bhiwani district of Haryana. to Sakat Singh who was sarpanch of Bapora.

== Career ==
Air Marshal Pirthi Singh was commissioned in the Indian Air Force in 1953. During his distinguished service of 39 years, he has held important command and staff appointments such as Command of the Aircraft and System Testing Establishment, Director Offensive Operations, Director Training, Assistant Chief of the Air Staff (Operations), Deputy Chief of Air Staff at Air Headquarters and Air Officer Commanding-in-Chief Western Air Command. He is a graduate of National Defence College.

In 1960 Prithi was categorized a Cat A1 instructor by Reggie Upot and was posted to 17 Sqn at Poona on Hunters under the CO ‘Johnny’ Bhasin and Flt Cdr ‘Johny’ Greene both to become towering professionals in the IAF.

As a test pilot, he conducted evaluation trials of combat aircraft operated by the Air Force. In 1979, he was appointed Commandant of the Aircraft System and Testing Establishment (ASTE), where he was involved in the testing and development of new equipment. During his tenure, he participated in aeronautical development activities and was involved with the Test Pilot School at ASTE.

As Deputy Chief of Air Staff, Air Marshal Singh continued to display qualities of dedication and professional excellence. His planning and perception of the long term operational requirements of the Air Force was a contributory factor to finalization of some long term plans.

Perhaps no other test pilot evaluated as many aircraft types as Prithi Singh to be considered for service in IAF. These included the Sukhoi Su-7, 160 of which type saw IAF service and flew over 1600 sorties in the 1971 War. He evaluated all new combat aircraft offered to IAF, including those for meeting the Deep Penetration Strike Aircraft (DPSA) requirement such as the Anglo-French Jaguar, French Mirage F1, British Buccaneer and the Swedish Viggen. By the time Air Marshal Prithi Singh finished his flying career in IAF, he had piloted around 120 aircraft types and their various versions, perhaps an unmatched IAF record. For his many remarkable contributions to IAF, flying over 6300 hours without a single avoidable accident and setting a shining example to younger officers. Of this he had flown almost 5200 hrs on single engine aircraft. In fact in the last month of his service career he flew 26 sorties and 51:15 hrs.

== The Final Innings ==
In February 2003, marking 50 years of military flying, Prithi flew the Aero Vodochody and Boeing L-159 at the Aero India 2003 air show at Yelahanka. By that time, he had piloted 105 aircraft types.

== Personal life ==
He was married to Shiv Kanwar, daughter of Lt. Colonel Rai Bahadur Thakur Devi Singhji, last jagirdar of thikana Chittora of erstwhile Jaipur State. His son Air Marshal Vikram Singh is also a Test Pilot who had worked extensively on the Light Combat Aircraft. Prithi’s daughter is married to Air Marshal Sandeep Singh, Vice Chief of the Air Staff. Prithi Singh was a tea-totaller and non-smoker. He kept himself very fit and was hardly ever beaten at squash by youngsters even as the AOC-in-C Western Air Command.

== Honors and decorations ==
During his career, Prithi Singh has been awarded the Param Vishist Seva Medal, Ati Vishisht Seva Medal, Vayu Sena Medal (BAR) for his service

Param Vishisht Seva Medal	Ati Vishisht Seva Medal	Vayu Sena Medal
