= Inderpal Singh Walia =

52nd Vice Chief of the Air Staff, Indian Air Force

Air Marshal Inderpal Singh Walia AVSM VM
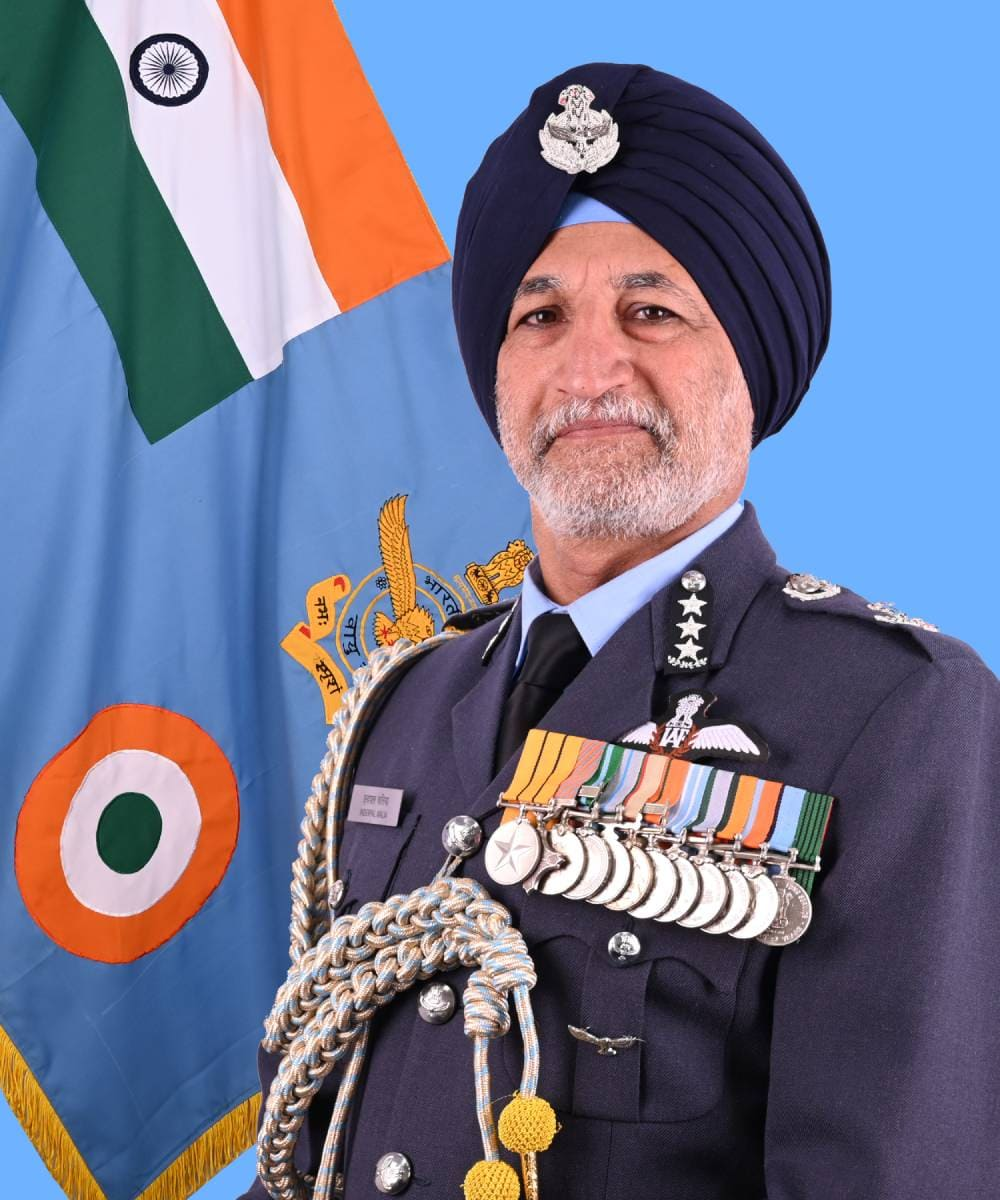

52nd Vice Chief of the Air Staff
- Incumbent
- Assumed office 1 November 2026
- President: Droupadi Murmu
- Minister of Defence: Rajnath Singh
- Preceded by: Ashutosh Dixit

Air Officer Commanding-in-Chief Eastern Air Command
- In office 1 February 2026 – 31 October 2026
- Chief of Air Staff: Amar Preet Singh
- Preceded by: Surat Singh
- Succeeded by: Mehtab Singh Deswal

Military service
- Allegiance: India
- Branch/service: Indian Air Force
- Years of service: 11 June 1988 - Present
- Rank: Air Marshal
- Unit: No. 222 Squadron
- Commands: Eastern Air Command; 1 Air Defence Control Centre; 15 Wing; TACDE; No. 222 Squadron
- Service Number: 19518
- Awards: Ati Vishisht Seva Medal; Vayu Sena Medal

Air Marshal Inderpal Singh Walia, AVSM, VM is a serving air officer of the Indian Air Force. He is currently serving as the 52nd Vice Chief of the Air Staff. He previously served as the Air Officer Commanding-in-Chief, Eastern Air Command, and as Senior Air Staff Officer, Eastern Air Command.

== Early life and education ==
The air officer is an alumnus of the National Defence Academy, Khadakwasla and the Air Force Academy, Dundigal. He is also an alumnus of the Advanced Command and Staff Course, United Kingdom and the National Defence College, Bangladesh. He holds three post-graduate degrees in Defence and Strategic Studies.

== Military career ==
He was commissioned into the fighter stream of the Indian Air Force on 11 June 1988 from the Air Force Academy. In a career spanning over three decades, he has more than 3200 hours of flying experience across various fighter jets and has held numerous command & staff appointments. He is a highly experienced fighter pilot and an Instrument Rating Instructor & Examiner (IRIE). He has flown various fighter aircraft of the Indian Air Force which include variants of the MiG-21, MiG-23, MiG-27, Jaguar and Su-30 MKI. The Air Marshal's operational tenures include being the Commanding Officer of No. 222 Squadron and was the Commandant of Tactics and Combat Development Establishment (TACDE). He also served as the Defence Attaché at the Embassy of India in Japan.

As an Air Commodore, he served as the Air-1 at Eastern Air Command, as the Air Officer Commanding of 15 Wing, Bareilly and later as the Air Commodore (Air Staff Inspection) at the Air headquarters, New Delhi. As an Air Vice Marshal, he served as the Assistant Chief of Air Staff, Training and as the Air Officer Commanding of 1 Air Defence Control Centre.

After being promoted to the rank of Air Marshal, on 9 September 2024 he took over as Senior Air Staff Officer of the Eastern Air Command at Shillong. On 1 February 2026, Air Marshal Inderpal Singh Walia took over as the Air Officer Commanding-in-Chief, Eastern Air Command succeeding Air Marshal Surat Singh when the latter superannuated on 31 January 2026.

On 1 November 2026, he took over as the 52nd Vice Chief of the Air Staff succeeding Air Chief Marshal Ashutosh Dixit, upon the latter's elevation as the Chief of the Air Staff.

== Awards and decorations ==
During his career, the air marshal has been awarded the Ati Vishisht Seva Medal in 2018 and the Vayu Sena Medal in 2008.

Ati Vishisht Seva Medal	Vayu Sena Medal	Samanya Seva Medal	Operation Vijay Medal
Operation Parakram Medal	Sainya Seva Medal	Videsh Seva Medal	75th Anniversary of Independence Medal
50th Independence Anniversary Medal	30 Years Long Service Medal	20 Years Long Service Medal	9 Years Long Service Medal

== Dates of ranks ==
Insignia	Rank	Component	Date of rank
	Pilot Officer	Indian Air Force	11 June 1988
	Flying Officer	Indian Air Force	11 June 1989
	Flight Lieutenant	Indian Air Force	11 June 1993
	Squadron Leader	Indian Air Force	11 June 1995
	Wing Commander	Indian Air Force	18 October 2004
	Group Captain	Indian Air Force	1 April 2010
	Air Commodore	Indian Air Force	1 March 2016
	Air Vice Marshal	Indian Air Force	31 August 2021
	Air Marshal	Indian Air Force	9 September 2024

Military offices
Preceded by Ashutosh Dixit	Vice Chief of Air Staff; 1 November 2026 – Present	Succeeded by Incumbent
Preceded by Surat Singh	Air Officer Commanding-in-Chief; Eastern Air Command; 1 February 2026 – 31 October 2026	Succeeded by Mehtab Singh Deswal
Preceded by Tejinder Singh	Senior Air Staff Officer; Eastern Air Command; 9 September 2024 - 31 January 2026	Succeeded by Devendra P Hirani
