= Suraj Kumar Jha =

Air Marshal Suraj Kumar Jha PVSM, AVSM
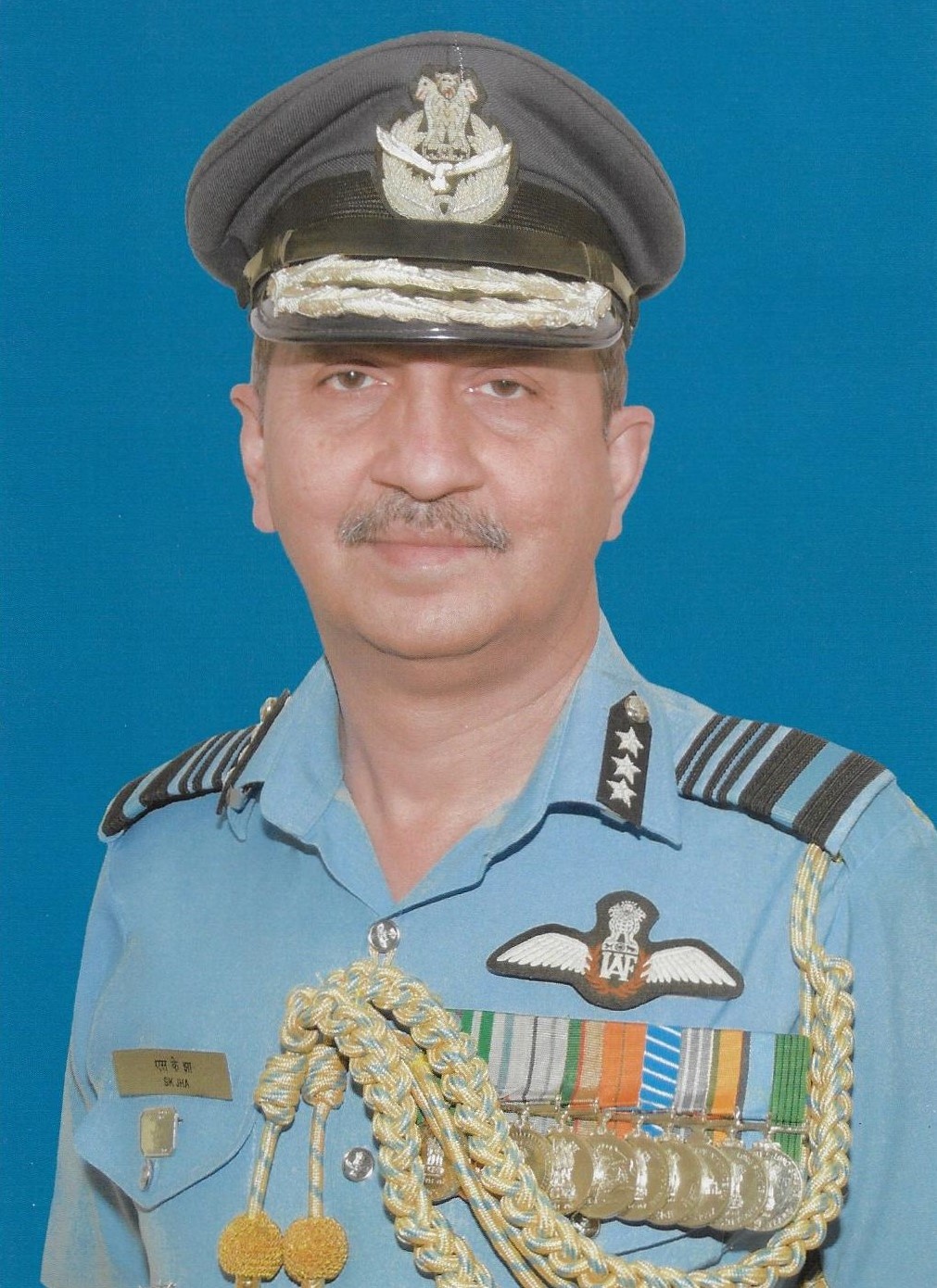
- Military career
- Allegiance: India
- Branch: Indian Air Force
- Service years: 8 Jun 1984 – 31 August 2023
- Rank: Air Marshal
- Service number: 17445
- Unit: No. 7 Squadron
- Commands: Air Officer-in-Charge Personnel; Deputy Chief of the Air Staff
- Conflicts: Kargil War
- Awards: Param Vishisht Seva Medal; Ati Vishisht Seva Medal

Air Marshal Suraj Kumar Jha, PVSM, AVSM is a retired officer in the Indian Air Force who last served as the Air Officer-in-Charge Personnel. He assumed the office on 1 August 2021 succeeding Air Marshal Richard John Duckworth. Previously, he served as Deputy Chief of the Air Staff at Air Headquarters Vayu Bhawan in New Delhi succeeding Air Marshal Sandeep Singh.

== Early life and education ==
Suraj Kumar Jha was born in Madhubani, Bihar, on 15 August 1963. He joined Sainik School Tilaiya and from there he joined the National Defence Academy. There he was the all India UPSC topper in 1980. Suraj Kumar Jha is an alumnus of Defence Services Staff College.

== Career ==
Suraj Kumar Jha was commissioned as a fighter pilot in the Indian Air Force on 8 June 1984. In a distinguish career spanning 37 years, he has flown a variety of fighter and trainer aircraft with more than 2900 hours of operational flying.

With a career of 37 years in the IAF, he was the commanding officer of a front line fighter aircraft squadron and a fighter base. As an Air Vice Marshal, he served as the Air Officer Commanding Advance Headquarters, was the Commandant of College of Air Warfare, Assistant Chief of Integrated Defence Staff. He is an alumnus of the Air Force Academy and the Defence Services Staff College, Wellington.

== Honours and decorations ==
During his career, Suraj Kumar Jha was awarded the Param Vishisht Seva Medal in 2023, Ati Vishisht Seva Medal in 2021 and was Mention-in-Despatches by Chief of the Air Staff in 1999 for his actions in Kargil War.

Param Vishisht Seva Medal	Ati Vishisht Seva Medal

Military offices
Preceded by Richard John Duckworth	Air Officer-in-Charge Personnel; 1 August 2021 – 31 August 2023	Succeeded by Nagesh Kapoor
Preceded by Sandeep Singh	Deputy Chief of the Air Staff; 1 May 2021 – 31 July 2021	Succeeded by Narmdeshwar Tiwari
