= Ashutosh Dixit =

29th Chief of the Air Staff, Indian Air Force

Air Chief Marshal Ashutosh Dixit PVSM AVSM VM VSM
- Official portrait, 2026

29th Chief of the Air Staff
- Incumbent
- Assumed office 31 October 2026
- President: Droupadi Murmu
- Minister of Defence: Rajnath Singh
- Preceded by: Amar Preet Singh

51st Vice Chief of the Air Staff
- In office 1 July 2026 – 31 October 2026
- President: Droupadi Murmu
- Chief of Air Staff: Amar Preet Singh
- Preceded by: Nagesh Kapoor
- Succeeded by: Inderpal Singh Walia

Chief of Integrated Defence Staff
- In office 1 May 2025 – 30 June 2026
- Preceded by: Johnson P Mathew
- Succeeded by: Tejinder Singh

Air Officer Commanding-in-Chief Central Air Command
- In office 1 September 2024 – 30 April 2025
- Preceded by: Ravi Gopal Krishana Kapoor
- Succeeded by: Balakrishnan Manikantan

Personal details
- Born: 9 December 1966 (age 59)
- Spouse: Archana Dixit

Military service
- Allegiance: India
- Branch/service: Indian Air Force
- Years of service: 6 December 1986 – Present
- Rank: Air Chief Marshal
- Unit: No. 9 Squadron
- Commands: Central Air Command; AFS Bidar; No. 9 Squadron
- Battles/wars: Operation Rakshak; Kargil War; Operation Safed Sagar
- Service number: 18558
- Awards: Param Vishisht Seva Medal; Ati Vishisht Seva Medal; Vayu Sena Medal; Vishisht Seva Medal

Air Chief Marshal Ashutosh Dixit, PVSM, AVSM, VM, VSM (born 9 December 1966) is a serving four star officer of the Indian Air Force. He is current and the 29th Chief of the Air Staff. He was previously serving as the 51st Vice Chief of the Air Staff. He earlier served as the Chief of Integrated Defence Staff, as Air Officer Commanding-in-Chief, Central Air Command, as Deputy Chief of the Air Staff and as Senior Air Staff Officer, South Western Air Command.

== Early life and education ==
He spent his early years in Lucknow, where he received his early education and has ancestral roots in Maholi, Sitapur district, Uttar Pradesh. He is an alumnus of 69th course of the National Defence Academy, Khadakwasla where he was part of Foxtrot squadron along with Chief of Army Staff General Dhiraj Seth and subsequently joined the Air Force Academy, Dundigal. He is also an alumnus of Defence Services Command and Staff College, Bangladesh and National Defence College, New Delhi.

== Military Career ==
The air officer was commissioned as a fighter pilot in the Indian Air Force on 6 December 1986 from the Air Force Academy. In a career spanning over three decades, he has more than 3300 hours of flying experience across various fighter jets and has held various command & staff appointments. He is an experimental test pilot, qualified flying instructor and a fighter combat leader who has flown the HPT-32, AN-32, AVRO, Kiran, Jaguar, IL-78 and HAWK. The air marshal's operational tenure include being the Commanding Officer of No. 9 Squadron 'Wolfpack Squadron'. He re-equipped No. 9 Sqn with Mirage-2000 and later commanded a front line fighter air base in Western Sector and Flight Test Squadron, ASTE in Bengaluru. He has participated in Operation Rakshak & Operation Safed Sagar during the Kargil War.

As an Air Commodore, Dixit served as the Principal Director, Air Staff Requirements at Air Headquarters, New Delhi and later served as the Air Officer Commanding, Air Force Station Bidar, Karnataka. As Air Vice Marshal, he served as the Air Defence Commander, Southern Air Command, as the Assistant Chief of Air Staff, Projects and as Assistant Chief of Air Staff, Plans at the Air Headquarters, New Delhi.

After being promoted to the rank of Air Marshal on 1 October 2022, he assumed the appointment of Senior Air Staff Officer, South Western Air Command. On 15 May 2023, Air marshal Dixit took over as the Deputy Chief of the Air Staff succeeding Air Marshal Narmdeshwar Tiwari. He has headed several projects with the adaption of future technologies and worked towards ensuring that IAF achieves modernization while maintaining a steady focus on 'Aatmanirbharta' i.e. self reliance. A number of indigenous aircraft projects including LCA Mark-1A, Mark-2 and AMCA have seen significant forward movement during his tenure as Deputy Chief.

On 1 September 2024, Air marshal Dixit took over as the Air Officer Commanding-in-Chief, Central Air Command succeeding Air Marshal Ravi Gopal Krishana Kapoor. He relinquished the command of Central Air Command on 30 April 2025. On 1 May 2025, he assumed the appointment of Chief of Integrated Defence Staff succeeding Lieutenant General Johnson P Mathew, who superannuated on 30 April 2025.

On 1 July 2026, Air marshal Dixit took over as the 51st Vice Chief of Air Staff succeeding Air Marshal Nagesh Kapoor when the latter superannuated on 30 June 2026.

=== Chief of the Air Staff ===
On 6 October 2026, the Government of India appointed Air marshal Ashutosh Dixit as the next Chief of the Air Staff. On 31 October 2026, Air Chief Marshal Ashutosh Dixit took over as the 29th Chief of the Air Staff succeeding Air Chief Marshal Amar Preet Singh who superannuated after more than four decades of service. On assuming charge as the CAS, he outlined his vision of 'VAYU' (Note: V stands for Vigilance and readiness, A for Atmanirbharta, Y for Yukti which denotes ingenuity and U for Unity of effort.) comprising four elements for the Indian Air Force.

== Personal life ==
He is married to Mrs. Archana Dixit, who also serves as President of Air Force Families Welfare Association (AFFWA). The couple is blessed with two children.

== Awards and decorations ==
During his career, he has been awarded the Param Vishisht Seva Medal in 2026, the Ati Vishisht Seva Medal in 2023, the Vayu Sena Medal in 2006 and Vishisht Seva Medal in 2011.

Param Vishisht Seva Medal	Ati Vishisht Seva Medal		Vayu Sena Medal
Vishisht Seva Medal	Operation Vijay Star	Operation Vijay Medal	Operation Parakram Medal
Sainya Seva Medal	High Altitude Medal	Videsh Seva Medal	75th Independence Anniversary Medal
50th Independence Anniversary Medal	30 Years Long Service Medal	20 Years Long Service Medal	9 Years Long Service Medal

== Dates of ranks ==
Insignia	Rank	Component	Date of rank
	Pilot Officer	Indian Air Force	6 December 1986
	Flying Officer	Indian Air Force	6 December 1987
	Flight Lieutenant	Indian Air Force	6 December 1991
	Squadron Leader	Indian Air Force	6 December 1997
	Wing Commander	Indian Air Force	5 May 2003
	Group Captain	Indian Air Force	1 March 2009
	Air Commodore	Indian Air Force	17 June 2013
	Air Vice Marshal	Indian Air Force	11 June 2019
	Air Marshal	Indian Air Force	1 October 2022
	Air Chief Marshal (CAS)	Indian Air Force	31 October 2026

== Notes ==
Military offices
Preceded by Amar Preet Singh	Chief of Air Staff; 31 October 2026 – Present	Succeeded by Incumbent
Preceded by Nagesh Kapoor	Vice Chief of Air Staff; 1 July 2026 – 31 October 2026	Succeeded by Inderpal Singh Walia
Preceded by Johnson P Mathew	Chief of Integrated Defence Staff; 1 May 2025 – 30 June 2026	Succeeded by Tejinder Singh
Preceded by Ravi Gopal Krishana Kapoor	Air Officer Commanding-in-Chief; Central Air Command; 1 September 2024 – 30 April 2025	Succeeded by Balakrishnan Manikantan
Preceded by Narmdeshwar Tiwari	Deputy Chief of the Air Staff; 15 May 2023 – 31 August 2024	Succeeded by Tejinder Singh
Preceded by Sujeet Pushpakar Dharkar	Senior Air Staff Officer; South Western Air Command; 1 October 2022 – 14 May 2023	Succeeded by Manish Khanna
