= Brijpal Singh =

Colonel Brijpal Singh VrC
- Born: Bapora, Haryana, India
- Military career
- Allegiance: Republic of India
- Branch: Indian Army
- Rank: Colonel
- Service number: IC-2016
- Unit: 1 RAJPUT
- Conflicts: Indo-Pakistani War of 1947–1948
- Awards: Vir Chakra

Colonel Brijpal Singh was an officer of Indian Army who served with the Rajput Regiment. He was awarded Vir Chakra for his bravery in Indo-Pakistani War of 1947–1948.

== Personal life ==
He was Tanwar Rajput with roots in Bapora village in Bhiwani district of Haryana. He was born to Rao Bahadur Lieutenant Thakur Sukhpal Singh who, was a recipient of Indian Distinguished Service Medal and administrator at erstwhile Bhajji State. Prior to his retirement in 1940, his father, who was a member of the British Indian Army, had actively fought in both World Wars I and II. His grandfather Sardar Bahadur Captain Umda Singh was a Member of Royal Victorian Order and Aide-de-camp to King of United Kingdom Edward VII during his time. Later, he remained Honorary Magistrate of Tehsil Bhiwani.

== Education ==
After graduating from high school in Bhiwani, Major Singh enrolled in St Stephens College Delhi to pursue a senior secondary degree. He was commissioned into 1 RAJPUT on 16 September 1941.

== Military career ==
During the battle of Major Brijpal Singh was Second in Command of 1 RAJPUT. On o6 February, he was informed about the near annihilation of the forward most section of his battalion by the enemy but some men were still resisting the enemy’s advance and the post had not yet fallen. Since the reinforcement had not yet arrived, Major Singh collected some twelve men from the Battalion Headquarters and rushed forward immediately. After having regrouped, the enemy launched another attack on the post with more vigour. Though heavily outnumbered, the twelve men held on and broke the momentum of the enemy’s attack. Major Singh moved from trench to trench, inspiring the men. He kept on inspiring his men to fight the enemy to the last man, which broke the enemy morale, and eventually the enemy had to retreat leaving many casualties behind.^{[1]}

Major Brijpal Singh displayed gallantry, inspiring leadership, and exemplary tenacity throughout the action and was awarded Vir Chakra for his dauntless courage.

=== Vir Chakra Citation ===
CITATION

MAJOR BRIJPAL SINGH (IC-2016)

1ST BATTALION THE RAJPUT REGIMENT

On 6 February 1948, the enemy in overwhelming numbers attacked one of our key positions in Naushera in J&K. Major Brijpal Singh, who was in charge of a picquet with only two platoons under him, repulsed the attacks several times inflicting heavy casualties on the enemy.

Regardless of his personal safety, Major Brijpal Singh kept on inspiring his men to fight the enemy to the last man, which broke the enemy morale, and eventually the enemy had to retreat leaving many casualties behind.

— Ministry of Defence, India, https://www.gallantryawards.gov.in/awardee/1536
