= Sandeep Singh (air marshal) =

Indian Air Force officer (born 1963)

Air Marshal Sandeep Singh PVSM, AVSM, VM
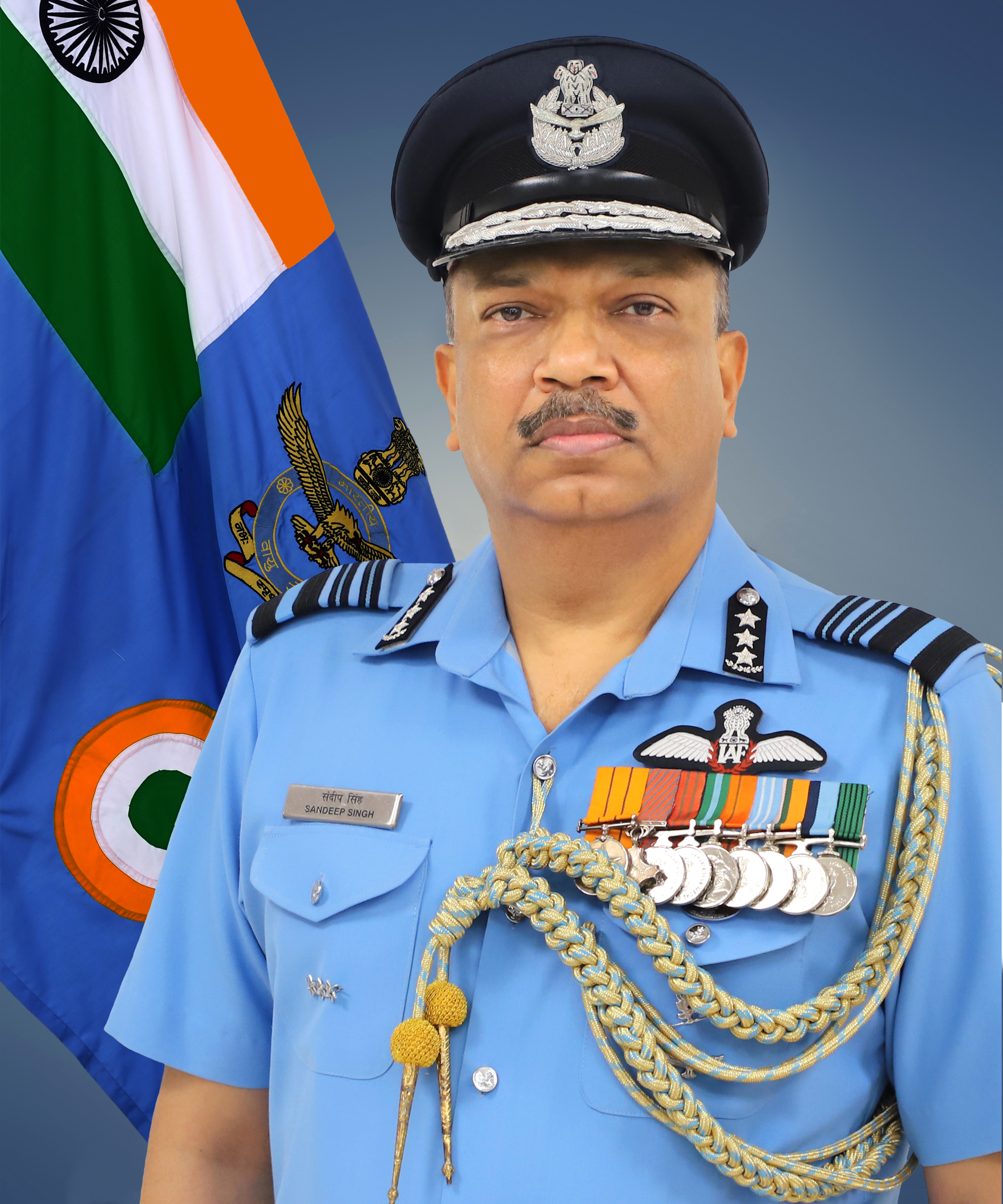

46th Vice Chief of the Air Staff
- In office 1 October 2021 – 31 January 2023
- Preceded by: Vivek Ram Chaudhari
- Succeeded by: Amar Preet Singh

Personal details
- Born: 15 January 1963 (age 63)
- Relations: Air Marshal Prithi Singh (father-in-law); Air Marshal Vikram Singh (brother-in-law)
- Awards: Param Vishisht Seva Medal; Ati Vishisht Seva Medal; Vayu Sena Medal

Military service
- Allegiance: India
- Branch/service: Indian Air Force
- Years of service: 22 December 1983– 31 January 2023
- Rank: Air Marshal
- Unit: No. 30 Squadron
- Commands: Vice Chief of the Air Staff; South Western Air Command; Deputy Chief of the Air Staff
- Service number: 17312

Air Marshal Sandeep Singh, PVSM, AVSM, VM, (born 15 January 1963) is a retired officer of the Indian Air Force currently serving as the Military Advisor in the National Security Council Secretariat. He served as the Vice Chief of the Air Staff, succeeding Vivek Ram Chaudhari. Previously, he served as the Air Officer Commanding-in-Chief (AOC-in-C), South Western Air Command.

== Career ==
Sandeep Singh was commissioned as a fighter pilot in the Indian Air Force on December 22, 1983. He has flying experience of over 4780 hrs of operational and test flying experience on Su-30 MKI, MiG-29, MiG-21, Kiran, An-32, AVRO, Jaguar and Mirage 2000.

A recipient of the Sword of Honor, Sandeep Singh is a qualified training instructor (A2 category). He was instrumental in the induction of Su-30MKI in the Indian Air Force.

With a long career of 37 years, he has commanded a fighter aircraft squadron, was an instructor at Air Force test pilot school and project test pilot for the Su-30MKI. Due to his proficient knowledge of the Su-30MKI platform, Sandeep Singh has been the mainstay liaison for implementation of various weapons and systems by DRDO.

He served as the Deputy Chief of Air Staff from 1 October 2019 to 30 April 2021. He has also served as Senior Air Staff Officer for the Eastern Air Command from 1 January 2019 to 30 September 2019.

He superannuated on 31 January 2023 and was succeeded by Air Marshal Amar Preet Singh.

He is currently Military Advisor in the National Security Council (India).

== Honours and decorations ==
During his career, Sandeep Singh was commended by the Chief of Air Staff and has been awarded the Vayu Sena Medal (VM), the Ati Vishisht Seva Medal (AVSM) in 2013 and the Param Vishisht Seva Medal in 2022.

Param Vishisht Seva Medal	Ati Vishisht Seva Medal	Vayusena Medal

== Personal life ==
He is married to Kamini Singh who is President of Air Force Wives Welfare Association (Regional). The couple is blessed with two daughters.

Military offices
Preceded by Vivek Ram Chaudhari	Vice Chief of Air Staff; 1 October 2021 - 31 January 2023	Succeeded by Amar Preet Singh
Preceded by Surendra Kumar Ghotia	Air Officer Commanding-in-Chief, South Western Air Command; 1 May 2021 - 30 September 2021	Succeeded by Vikram Singh
Preceded by Vivek Ram Chaudhari	Deputy Chief of the Air Staff; 1 October 2019 - 30 April 2021	Succeeded by Suraj Kumar Jha
Preceded by Rajesh Kumar	Senior Air Staff Officer - Eastern Air Command; 1 January 2019 - 30 September 2019	Succeeded by Vivek Ram Chaudhari
