= Sarvottam Yudh Seva Medal =

Military award in India given for exceptional service of the highest order in wartime

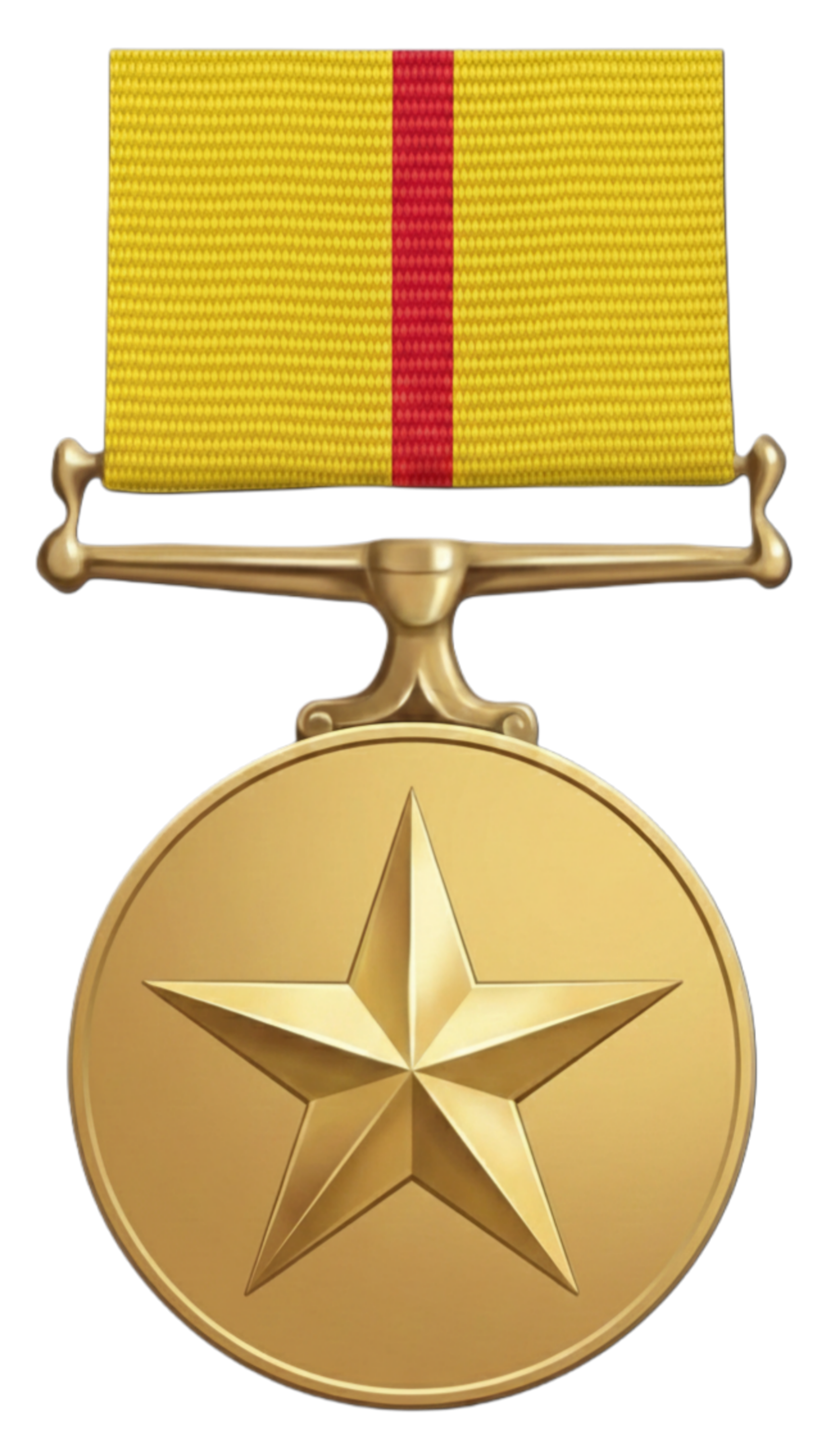
- Medal
- Type: Military medal Service medal
- Awarded for: Wartime distinguished service
- Country: India
- Presented by: Government of India
- Established: 26 January 1980
- First award: 26 January 1989
- Final award: 15 August 2025

Highlights
- Total: 10
- Total recipients: 10
- Ribbon

Precedence
- Next (higher): Padma Bhushan
- Equivalent: Param Vishisht Seva Medal (Note: Though the Param Vishisht Seva Medal is placed below the Sarvottam Yudh Seva Medal in the precedence, it is considered as a peacetime equivalent of Sarvottam Yudh Seva Medal.)
- Next (lower): Uttam Yudh Seva Medal

The Sarvottam Yudh Seva Medal (Ultimate War Service Medal) is India's highest wartime distinguished service decoration. It is awarded for the highest degree of distinguished service in an operational context, which includes times of war, conflict, or hostilities. The award is a war-time equivalent of the Param Vishisht Seva Medal, which is India's highest peacetime distinguished service decoration. The medal has been awarded to only 10 officers of the Indian Armed Forces.

== History ==
The medal was instituted on 26 January 1980 and gazetted on 26 June that year. Two other medals for distinguished service during war/conflict/hostilities were also instituted on the same day, the Uttam Yudh Seva Medal and the Yudh Seva Medal.

== Eligibility ==
The Sarvottam Yudh Seva Medal may be awarded posthumously. It is awarded for "distinguished service of the most exceptional order during war/conflict/hostilities." It may be awarded to all ranks of the Army, the Navy and the Air Force including those of Territorial Army Units, Auxiliary and Reserve Forces and other lawfully constituted Armed Forces when embodied, as well as Nursing Officers and other members of the Nursing Services in the Armed Forces.

== Design ==
The medal is circular in shape, 35 mm in diameter and fitted to a plain horizontal bar with standard fittings. It is made of gold gilt. On its obverse is the State Emblem and the inscriptions "SARVOTTAM YUDH SEVA MEDAL" (in English). On its reverse, it has a five pointed star. Ribbon: Golden colour with one red vertical stripe in the centre dividing it into two equal parts. The riband is of gold colour with one red stripe down the centre dividing it into two equal parts. If a recipient of the medal is subsequently awarded the medal again, every such further award shall be recognized by a bar to be attached to the riband by which the medal is suspended. For every such bar, a miniature insignia of a pattern approved by the Government shall be added to the riband when worn alone.

== List of recipients ==
No.	Name	Branch	Conflict	Appointment at the time of award	Date of Award	References
1	Lieutenant General Amarjit Singh Kalkat AVSM VSM	Indian Army	Operation Pawan	GOC-in-C Southern Command	26 January 1989	
2	Air Marshal Vinod Patney PVSM AVSM VrC	Indian Air Force	Kargil War	AOC-in-C Western Air Command	15 August 1999	
3	Lieutenant General Hari Mohan Khanna PVSM AVSM	Indian Army	Kargil War	GOC-in-C Northern Command	26 January 2000	
4	Lieutenant General Pratik Sharma PVSM AVSM SM	Indian Army	Operation Sindoor	GOC-in-C Northern Command	15 August 2025	
5	Lieutenant General Rajiv Ghai UYSM AVSM SM***	Indian Army	Operation Sindoor	Director General Military Operations	15 August 2025	
6	Vice Admiral Sanjay Jasjit Singh PVSM AVSM NM	Indian Navy	Operation Sindoor	FOC-in-C Western Naval Command	15 August 2025	
7	Air Marshal Narmdeshwar Tiwari PVSM AVSM VM	Indian Air Force	Operation Sindoor	Vice Chief of the Air Staff	15 August 2025	
8	Air Marshal Nagesh Kapoor PVSM AVSM VM	Indian Air Force	Operation Sindoor	AOC-in-C South Western Air Command	15 August 2025	
9	Air Marshal Jeetendra Mishra AVSM VSM	Indian Air Force	Operation Sindoor	AOC-in-C Western Air Command	15 August 2025	
10	Air Marshal Awadhesh Kumar Bharti AVSM VM	Indian Air Force	Operation Sindoor	Director General Air Operations	15 August 2025	
