= Vikram Singh (air marshal) =

Indian Air Force officer (born 1963)

Air Marshal Vikram Singh AVSM, VSM
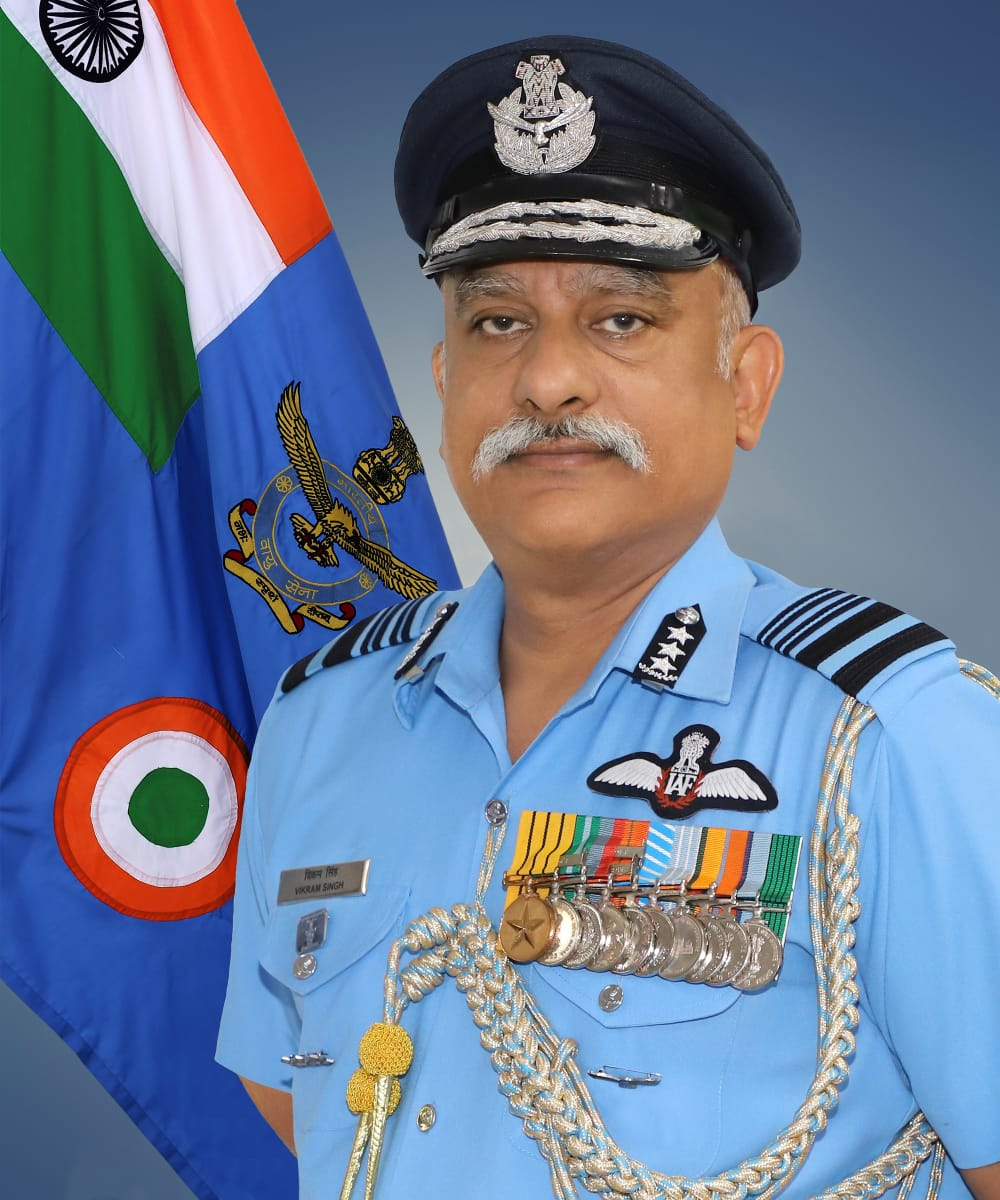

Personal details
- Born: April 9, 1963 (age 63) Bapora, Haryana, India
- Spouse: Dr. Arathi Singh
- Relations: Air Marshal Sandeep Singh
- Parent: Air Marshal Prithi Singh
- Awards: Ati Vishisht Seva Medal; Vishisht Seva Medal

Military service
- Allegiance: India
- Branch/service: Indian Air Force
- Years of service: 21 December 1984 - 30 April 2023
- Rank: Air Marshal
- Unit: No.7 Squadron
- Commands: South Western Air Command
- Service number: 17699

Vikram Singh, AVSM, VSM is a retired officer of the Indian Air Force. He served as the Air Officer Commanding-in-Chief (AOC-in-C), South Western Air Command. He took over the office on 1 October 2021, following the appointment of Air Marshal Sandeep Singh as the Vice Chief of the Air Staff.

== Career ==
Vikram Singh was commissioned as a fighter pilot in the Indian Air Force on December 21, 1984. He has flying experience on MiG-21 and Mirage 2000.

Vikram Singh undertook the Flying Instructor's Course, Experimental Flight Test Course and Staff Course at Pretoria, South Africa. He has performed Flight Test duties at the National Flight Test Centre at Aeronautic Development Agency. He had commanded an Air Force Station and served as the Air Attaché at Moscow, Russia.

He has also served at the Integrated Defence Staff Headquarters and was Assistant Chief of the Air Staff (Plans) at Air Headquarters. Previous to his present assignment, he had served as Senior Air Staff Officer for the Western Air Command from 1 October 2020 to 30 September 2021.

== Honours and decorations ==
Singh has been awarded the Vishisht Seva Medal (VSM) in 2009, the Ati Vishisht Seva Medal in 2022. ^{[7]}

Ati Vishisht Seva Medal	Vishisht Seva Medal	Samanya Seva Medal	Special Service Medal
Sainya Seva Medal	High Altitude Medal	Videsh Seva Medal	75th Independence Anniversary Medal
50th Independence Anniversary Medal	30 Years Long Service Medal	20 Years Long Service Medal	9 Years Long Service Medal

== Personal life ==
He is the son of Air Marshal Prithi Singh who served as the Air Officer Commanding-in-Chief, Western Air Command.

Singh is married to Arathi Singh who is President of Air Force Wives Welfare Association (Regional). The couple has children.

Military offices
Preceded by Sandeep Singh	Air Officer Commanding-in-Chief, South Western Air Command; 1 October 2021 - 30 April 2023	Succeeded by Narmdeshwar Tiwari
Preceded by Richard John Duckworth	Senior Air Staff Officer - Western Air Command; 1 October 2020 - 30 September 2021	Succeeded by Radhakrishnan Radhish
