= No. 9 Squadron IAF =

No. 9 Squadron Wolfpack
- Insignia of The No. 9 Squadron "Wolfpack"
- Active: 16 March 1964 – present
- Country: Republic of India
- Allegiance: Indian Armed Forces
- Branch: Indian Air Force
- Role: Fighter
- Garrison/HQ: Gwalior AFS
- Nickname: "Wolfpack"
- Mottos: Sahase Wasati Jayashrih; In Courage resides Victory

Aircraft flown
- Fighter: Dassault Mirage 2000H/TH Past aircraft :- Folland Gnat; HAL Ajeet; MiG-27; Hawker Hurricane

No. 9 Squadron also known as The Wolfpack Squadron nicknamed as Wolfpack is a fighter squadron and is equipped with Mirage 2000 and based at Gwalior AFS under Central Air Command.

It is home to the Indian Air Force's elite Tactics and Air Combat Development Establishment (TACDE), a premier unit for advanced fighter pilot training in aerial tactics, comparable to the US Navy's TOPGUN, focusing on operational doctrines and tactics for aircraft

== History ==
No. 9 Squadron IAF was formed on 16 March 1964 with Wing Commander Reginald John Manual Upot as its first commanding officer.

=== Indo-Pakistani War of 1965 ===
During the 1965 conflict, No. 9 Squadron operated as a frontline interceptor unit equipped with the Folland Gnat Mk. 1. Having been reformed only in March 1964 at Air Force Station Hindon, the "Wolfpack" was quickly mobilised to provide air defence and fighter escort for the Indian Air Force's offensive strike missions across the Punjab and Jammu sectors.

==== Air Defence and Combat Readiness ====
As one of the earliest squadrons to operationalise the Gnat, No. 9 Squadron was tasked with protecting vital Indian airbases and industrial hubs from pre-emptive strikes by the Pakistan Air Force (PAF). The squadron maintained high-readiness alerts at its home base and forward operating locations, including Ambala, to intercept intruding F-86 Sabres and F-104 Starfighters.

==== Escort and Aerial Engagement ====
Throughout the 22-day war, the "Wolfpack" conducted numerous Combat Air Patrols (CAP) and provided essential fighter cover for IAF strike aircraft, such as the Mystère IVAs and Canberras, which were targeting enemy armour and supply lines. The Gnat's superior agility and small visual profile allowed No. 9 Squadron pilots to engage in high-speed dogfights, successfully neutralising the technological edge of the PAF's radar-equipped adversaries.

The squadron's performance in 1965 was instrumental in establishing the Gnat’s reputation as the "Sabre Slayer." Although the unit was in its formative stages following its reformation, the tactical discipline displayed by its pilots contributed to the IAF’s broader objective of achieving air parity and, eventually, superiority over the contested battlefields of the western front.

=== Indo-Pakistani War of 1971 ===
During the 1971 conflict, No. 9 Squadron was a frontline interceptor unit equipped with the Folland Gnat F.1, a lightweight fighter aircraft celebrated for its agility in dogfights. Stationed at Air Force Station Hindon under the Western Air Command, the squadron's primary mandate was to provide Point Air Defence for the National Capital Region (NCR) and conduct tactical interceptions against encroaching Pakistani aircraft.

==== Air Defence and Interception ====
The squadron maintained a high state of operational readiness throughout the 14-day war, frequently launching Combat Air Patrols (CAP) to intercept intruders from the Pakistan Air Force (PAF). Due to its base location, the "Wolfpack" served as a critical shield for high-value targets in northern India.

The Gnat's small radar cross-section and high rate of climb made No. 9 Squadron a formidable opponent for the PAF's F-86 Sabres. Pilots from the unit were tasked with engaging enemy strikes before they could reach their inland objectives, utilizing the aircraft’s twin 30mm ADEN cannons in close-quarters aerial combat.

==== Escort and Strike Support ====
Beyond its defensive role, No. 9 Squadron also provided fighter escort for IAF bomber and transport missions. Their presence ensured that slower strike aircraft could deliver their payloads over enemy installations with a reduced risk of interception. The squadron's tactical expertise in the Gnat contributed significantly to the IAF achieving total air superiority in the Western theatre by the second week of the war.

The experience gained by the "Wolfpack" in 1971 cemented the squadron’s reputation for air-to-air combat excellence, a legacy that continued through its later transitions to the MiG-27 and eventually the Mirage 2000.

=== Operation Safed Sagar (1999 Kargil War) ===
During the 1999 Kargil conflict, No. 9 Squadron, then stationed at Air Force Station Hindon and equipped with the MiG-27ML, played a significant role in the IAF's offensive air operations. Codenamed Operation Safed Sagar, the campaign required the squadron to execute high-altitude strike missions against entrenched infiltrators in the rugged terrain of the Batalik and Dras sectors.

==== Operational Challenges and Tactics ====
The squadron faced unprecedented technical challenges due to the extreme altitudes (often exceeding 18,000 feet) and the rarified atmosphere, which affected engine performance and weapon trajectory. To counter the threat of man-portable air-defence systems (MANPADS) like the Stinger missile, No. 9 Squadron pilots adapted their tactics, transitioning from low-level strikes to high-altitude bombing.

The MiG-27s of the "Wolfpack" were utilised for:

- Close Air Support (CAS): Providing direct fire support to Indian Army infantry units attempting to recapture strategic peaks.
- Interdiction Strikes: Targeting enemy supply lines, ammunition dumps, and administrative hubs located behind the immediate front lines.
- Photo Reconnaissance: Conducting high-speed runs to gather visual intelligence on enemy positions despite the difficult contrast of the snow-covered rocky terrain.

==== Key Engagements ====
No. 9 Squadron was one of the primary units involved in the initial wave of airstrikes starting on 26 May 1999. Their MiG-27s were noted for their stability as weapon platforms during steep-dive attacks. Pilots from the squadron frequently operated out of forward bases such as Awantipur and Srinagar to maximise their time over the target zones.

The experience gained by No. 9 Squadron during the Kargil War—specifically in high-altitude precision and the delivery of unguided munitions with high accuracy—laid the foundational expertise for the squadron’s later transition to the Mirage 2000 and its eventual role in the 2019 Balakot strike.

==== Operation Bandar (2019 Balakot Airstrike) ====
In February 2019, No. 9 Squadron played a pivotal role in Operation Bandar, the Indian Air Force's pre-emptive strike against a Jaish-e-Mohammed (JeM) terror camp in Balakot, Pakistan. Operating the upgraded Mirage 2000I (standardised from the Mirage 2000H), the "Wolfpack" served as the lead kinetic element of the mission.

On the morning of 26 February, several aircraft from the squadron crossed the Line of Control (LoC) into Pakistani airspace. They successfully deployed SPICE 2000 precision-guided munitions against designated targets on a wooded hilltop in the Mansehra District. The squadron's Mirage 2000s were selected for this high-stakes mission due to their advanced electronic warfare (EW) suites and their unique capability to integrate the Israeli-made SPICE 2000 bombs, which allow for "stand-off" ranges and high-impact accuracy.

In recognition of their "stunning precision" and operational success, the Chief of the Air Staff, Air Chief Marshal R.K.S. Bhadauria, awarded a Unit Citation to No. 9 Squadron on the 87th Air Force Day (8 October 2019). The citation highlighted the squadron's role in maintaining the highest levels of operational readiness and executing a complex mission in contested airspace.

=== Assignments ===
- Indo-Pakistani War of 1965
- Indo-Pakistani War of 1971
- Operation Safed Sagar – Kargil War (Indo-Pak War of 1999)
- Balakot Strike 2019

== Aircraft ==
Aircraft	From	To	Air Base
Folland Gnat I	April 1964	March 1978	
HAL Ajeet	April 1978	June 1987	
MIG-27	October 1987	January 2003	
Dassault Mirage 2000H	January 2004	Present	AFS Gwalior
