= MiG Operational Flying Training Unit =

The MiG Operational Flying Training Unit or MOFTU is a unit of the Indian Air Force. It was formed on 15 December 1986 at Tezpur to impart Stage 3 training on the Mikoyan-Gurevich MiG-21 fighter aircraft.

The primary role of the unit is to provide operational flying training to pilots inducted into the fighter stream. MOFTU is the largest fighter-flying establishment in the Indian Air Force and consists of two squadrons, namely Alpha and Bravo.
