= No. 224 Squadron IAF =

No. 224 Squadron Warlords
- Insignia of The No. 224 Squadron IAF "Warlords"
- Active: 4 July 1983 – 31 March 2007; 31 March 2008 – present
- Country: India Republic of India
- Allegiance: Indian Armed Forces
- Branch: Indian Air Force
- Role: Ground attack Precision Strike
- Base: Jamnagar AFS
- Nickname: Warlords
- Motto: The Main Winger of Troopleader
- Engagements: Operation Meghdoot

Aircraft flown
- Attack: Jaguar IS Darin II

No. 224 Squadron IAF nicknamed as Warlords is a ground attack squadron based at Jamnagar Air Force Station. It was temporarily disbanded in 2007 after the retirement of MiG-23MF aircraft. The unit was resurrected in 2008 with Jaguar Darin II aircraft and continues to operate from Jamnagar.

== The crest ==
No.224 Sqn crest depicts a warrior on a chariot proceeding to war. The chariot signifies the weapon platforms which are highly lethal and flexible, the horse signifying the power and strength and the warrior is at high state of readiness and aiming his weapons on the enemies.

== History ==
No. 224 Sqn, IAF was raised on 4 July 1983 at Airforce Station Adampur under the command of Wg Cdr RA Massey, Vr C, as a part of Western Air Command. The unit was equipped with the Mig 23MF and assigned the Air defence role and later an additional peacetime role of Banner Target Towing. Later it moved to Jamnagar, its MiG-23s modified to tow targets.

No.224 Sqn was the last operator of the MiG-23MF before their retirement from the Indian Air Force in 2007. The final fly past of the closing ceremony was done by Wing Commander M. K. Singh flying a banner titles "End of an Era", Wing Commander Tapas Sahu, Squadron Leader Vijay Shelke and Wing Commander RS Jamdar.

== Operations ==
1. Operation Meghdoot from 1985 to 1986.
2. Operation Safed Sagar during May 1999.

== Awards and honours ==
No 224 Sqn was adjudged the best over all fighter squadron in Western Air Command during 1986-1987

1. Wg Cdr Radhakrishnan Radhish Vayusena Medal 2006
2. Sqn Ldr SV Bal Vayusena Medal 1991
3. WO L Jha Commendation by CAS 1997
4. WO HS Saini Commendation by CAS 1989
5. Sgt Tanwar RS Commendation by CAS 1988
6. Sgt K Damodaran Commendation by CAS 1988
7. WO Ravi Nandan Commendation by CAS 1987
8. Sgt Sagar SC Commendation by CAS 1986

== Aircraft ==
Aircraft types operated by 224 Squadron
Aircraft type	From	To	Air base
MiG-23 MF	4 July 1983	31 March 2007	AFS Adampur
Jaguar IS Darin II	31 March 2008	Present	AFS Jamnagar
