= Amar Preet Singh =

28th Chief of the Air Staff (India)

Air Chief Marshal Amar Preet Singh PVSM AVSM
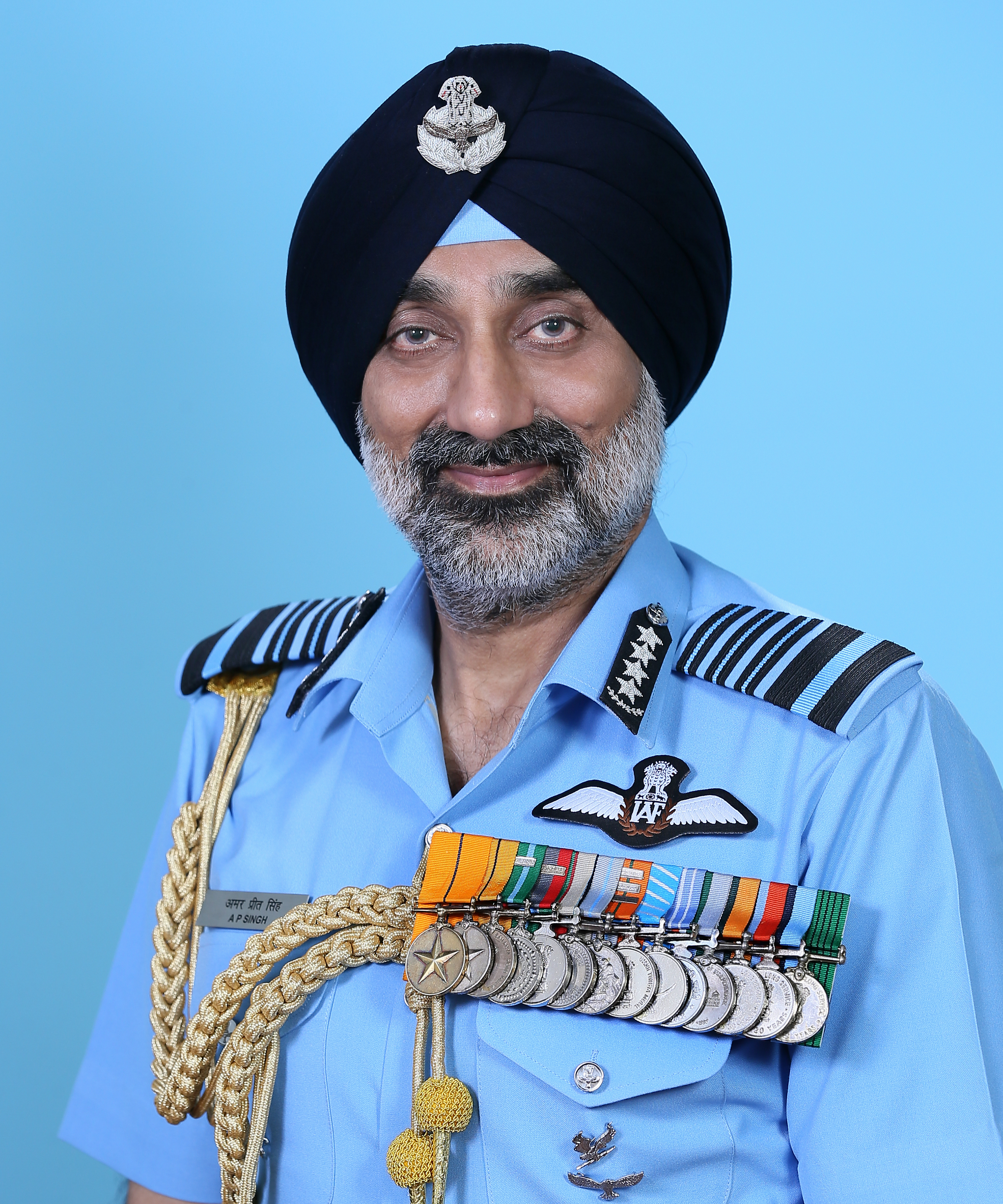
- Official portrait, 2024

28th Chief of the Air Staff
- In office 30 September 2024 – 31 October 2026
- President: Droupadi Murmu
- Minister of Defence: Rajnath Singh
- Preceded by: Vivek Ram Chaudhari
- Succeeded by: Ashutosh Dixit

47th Vice Chief of the Air Staff
- In office 1 February 2023 – 30 September 2024
- Chief of Air Staff: Vivek Ram Chaudhari
- Preceded by: Sandeep Singh
- Succeeded by: Sujeet Pushpakar Dharkar

Air Officer Commanding-in-Chief Central Air Command
- In office 1 July 2022 – 31 January 2023
- Chief of Air Staff: Vivek Ram Chaudhari
- Preceded by: Richard John Duckworth
- Succeeded by: Ravi Gopal Krishana Kapoor

Personal details
- Born: 27 October 1964 (age 62) New Delhi, India
- Spouse: Sarita Singh
- Education: National Defence Academy; Indian Air Force Academy

Military service
- Allegiance: India
- Branch/service: Indian Air Force
- Years of service: 21 December 1984 - 31 October 2026
- Rank: Air Chief Marshal
- Unit: No. 22 Squadron
- Commands: Central Air Command; 2 Air Defence Control Centre; No. 22 Squadron
- Battles/wars: Kargil War; Operation Parakram; Operation Sindoor
- Service Number: 17695
- Awards: Param Vishisht Seva Medal; Ati Vishisht Seva Medal

Air Chief Marshal Amar Preet Singh, PVSM, AVSM is a retired four star air officer of the Indian Air Force who last served as the 28th Chief of the Air Staff. He was previously serving as the 47th Vice Chief of the Air Staff. He earlier served as the Air Officer Commanding-in-Chief Central Air Command and as the Senior Air Staff Officer at the Eastern Air Command.

== Early life and education ==
He is an alumnus of S.B.M. School, Delhi and later the National Defence Academy, Khadakwasla and the Air Force Academy, Dundigal. He is also an alumnus of Defence Services Staff College, Wellington and National Defence College, New Delhi.

== Military career ==
The air officer was commissioned into the fighter stream of the Indian Air Force on 21 December 1984 from the Air Force Academy, Dundigal. In a distinguished career spanning across 38 years, he has tenanted various staff and instructional appointments. He has flown a variety of fighter and trainer aircraft with more than 5000 hours of operational flying. He is a Qualified Flying Instructor and an experimental test pilot with service flying on a variety of fixed wing and rotary wing aircraft. As Wing Commander, he commanded the No. 22 squadron, then made up of the MiG-27 fighter aircraft. He spearheaded the MiG-29 Upgrade Project Management Team at Moscow, Russia and was instrumental in flight testing of the HAL Tejas. He served as the Chief Test Pilot at Aircraft and Systems Testing Establishment.

After being promoted to the rank of Air Vice Marshal, he served as the Project Director at National Flight Test Center, Aeronautical Development Agency and as the Air Officer Commanding of 2 Air Defence Control Centre at Gandhinagar.

After being promoted to the rank of Air Marshal, he was appointed as the Senior Air Staff Officer of the Eastern Air Command at Shillong. A year later, on 1 July 2022, he took over as the Air Officer Commanding-in-Chief Central Air Command succeeding Air Marshal Richard John Duckworth who superannuated from service on 30 June 2022.

On 1 February 2023, Air Marshal Amar Preet Singh took over as the 47th Vice Chief of the Air Staff succeeding Air Marshal Sandeep Singh when the latter superannuated from service on 31 January 2023. As VCAS, he was at the forefront of the largest ever multinational Air Exercise Tarang Shakti held in India that was concluded in September 2024. In a significant message on the importance and the efficiency of India's indigenous Light Combat Aircraft Tejas, he flew extensively during the drill including a sortie with VCOAS Lieutenant General N. S. Raja Subramani and VCNS Vice Admiral Krishna Swaminathan.

=== Chief of the Air Staff ===
On 21 September 2024, the Government of India appointed Air Marshal Amar Preet Singh as the next Chief of the Air Staff. On 30 September 2024, Air Chief Marshal Amar Preet Singh took over as the 28th Chief of the Air Staff succeeding Air Chief Marshal Vivek Ram Chaudhari who superannuated after more than four decades of service. In February 2025, during Aero India 2025, he had criticised Hindustan Aeronautics Limited (HAL) for delays in delivering of the Tejas fighter aircraft. He has also supported the procurement of indigenously designed defence systems over imports from international companies.

He superannuated on 31 October 2026 after more than four decades of service to the nation and was succeeded by Air Chief Marshal Ashutosh Dixit.

== Personal life ==
He is married to Sarita Singh and the couple has a son and a daughter. He is a keen squash player.

== Awards and decorations ==
During his career, he has been awarded the Param Vishisht Seva Medal in 2023. and the Ati Vishisht Seva Medal in 2019.

	Param Vishisht Seva Medal	Ati Vishisht Seva Medal	
Samanya Seva Medal	Special Service Medal	Operation Vijay Medal	Operation Parakram Medal
Sainya Seva Medal	High Altitude Medal	Videsh Seva Medal	75th Independence Anniversary Medal
50th Independence Anniversary Medal	30 Years Long Service Medal	20 Years Long Service Medal	9 Years Long Service Medal

== Dates of rank ==
Insignia	Rank	Component	Date of rank
	Pilot Officer	Indian Air Force	21 December 1984
	Flying Officer	Indian Air Force	21 December 1985
	Flight Lieutenant	Indian Air Force	21 December 1989
	Squadron Leader	Indian Air Force	21 December 1995
	Wing Commander	Indian Air Force	14 May 2001
	Group Captain	Indian Air Force	5 November 2007
	Air Commodore	Indian Air Force	30 December 2010
	Air Vice Marshal	Indian Air Force	1 August 2016
	Air Marshal	Indian Air Force	1 February 2021
	Air Chief Marshal (CAS)	Indian Air Force	30 September 2024

Military offices
Preceded by Vivek Ram Chaudhari	Chief of Air Staff; 30 September 2024 - 31 October 2026	Succeeded by Ashutosh Dixit
Preceded by Sandeep Singh	Vice Chief of Air Staff; 1 February 2023 - 30 September 2024	Succeeded by Sujeet Pushpakar Dharkar
Preceded by Richard John Duckworth	Air Officer Commanding-in-Chief; Central Air Command; 1 July 2022 – 31 January 2023	Succeeded by Ravi Gopal Krishana Kapoor
Preceded by Gurcharan Singh Bedi	Senior Air Staff Officer; Eastern Air Command; 1 February 2021 – 30 June 2022	Succeeded by Balakrishnan Manikantan
