= Param Vishisht Seva Medal =

India military award for peacetime service

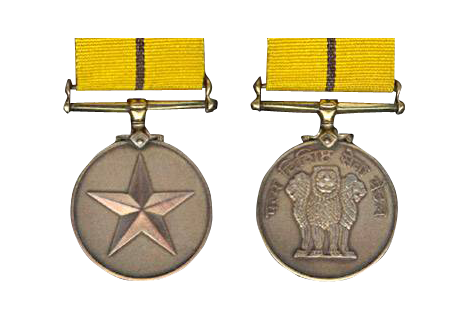
- Type: Military medal Service medal
- Awarded for: Peace-time service of the most exceptional order
- Country: India
- Presented by: Government of India
- Ribbon
- Established: 26 January 1960 (as "Vishisht Seva Medal Class I", renamed 27 January 1967)
- First award: 26 January 1961

Precedence
- Next (higher): Padma Bhushan
- Equivalent: Sarvottam Yudh Seva Medal (Note: Though the Param Vishisht Seva Medal is placed below the Sarvottam Yudh Seva Medal in the precedence, it is considered as a peacetime equivalent of Sarvottam Yudh Seva Medal.)
- Next (lower): Maha Vir Chakra

Param Vishisht Seva Medal (PVSM) (IAST: Parama Viśiṣṭa Sēvā, lit. 'Supreme Distinguished Service Medal') is a military award of India. It is the highest peacetime medal of the Indian Armed Forces, and is awarded for "distinguished service of the most exceptional order." The medal is awarded for "distinguished service rendered by personnel of the Armed Forces."

All ranks of the Armed Forces, including Territorial Army, Auxiliary and Reserve forces, Nursing officers and other members of the Nursing services and other lawfully constituted Armed Forces are eligible for the medal, which may be awarded multiple times as well as posthumously.

== History ==
The Param Vishisht Seva Medal was originally instituted as the "Vishisht Seva Medal, Class I" on 26 January 1960. Five other medals were instituted on the same day: the Sainya Seva Medal, Sena Medal, Nau Sena Medal and the Vayu Sena Medal. It was renamed on 27 January 1967, and the badge signed. Until 26 January 1980, when the Sarvottam Yudh Seva Medal (SYSM) was instituted, it was also awarded for distinguished war service.

== Design ==
The medal is round in shape, made of gold gilt, is 35 mm in diameter, and fitted to a plain horizontal bar with standard fitting. On its obverse is embossed a five-pointed star and on its reverse is the Indian state emblem and the inscription embossed along the upper rim. The golden riband is 32 mm in diameter with one dark blue stripe down the centre dividing it into two equal parts. On 27 January 1967, a miniature of the medal was authorised for certain occasions.

== Medal bar ==
If a recipient of the medal is subsequently awarded the medal again, every such further award shall be recognized by a bar to be attached to the riband by which the medal is suspended. For every such bar, a miniature insignia of a pattern approved by the Government of India shall be added to the riband when worn alone. The following individuals have received multiple awards of the PVSM:

No.	Rank	Name	Branch	First Award	Second Award
1	Rear Admiral	Bansh Raj Singh	Indian Navy	26 January 1970	20 January 1972
2	Major General	Naresh Kumar	Indian Army	26 January 1983	26 January 1989

== Lists of recipients ==
- List of Param Vishisht Seva Medal recipients (1960–1969)
- List of Param Vishisht Seva Medal recipients (1970–1979)
- List of Param Vishisht Seva Medal recipients (1980–1989)
- List of Param Vishisht Seva Medal recipients (1990–1999)
- List of Param Vishisht Seva Medal recipients (2000–2009)
- List of Param Vishisht Seva Medal recipients (2010–2019)
- List of Param Vishisht Seva Medal recipients (2020–2029)
