= President's Colour Award =

Military award of India

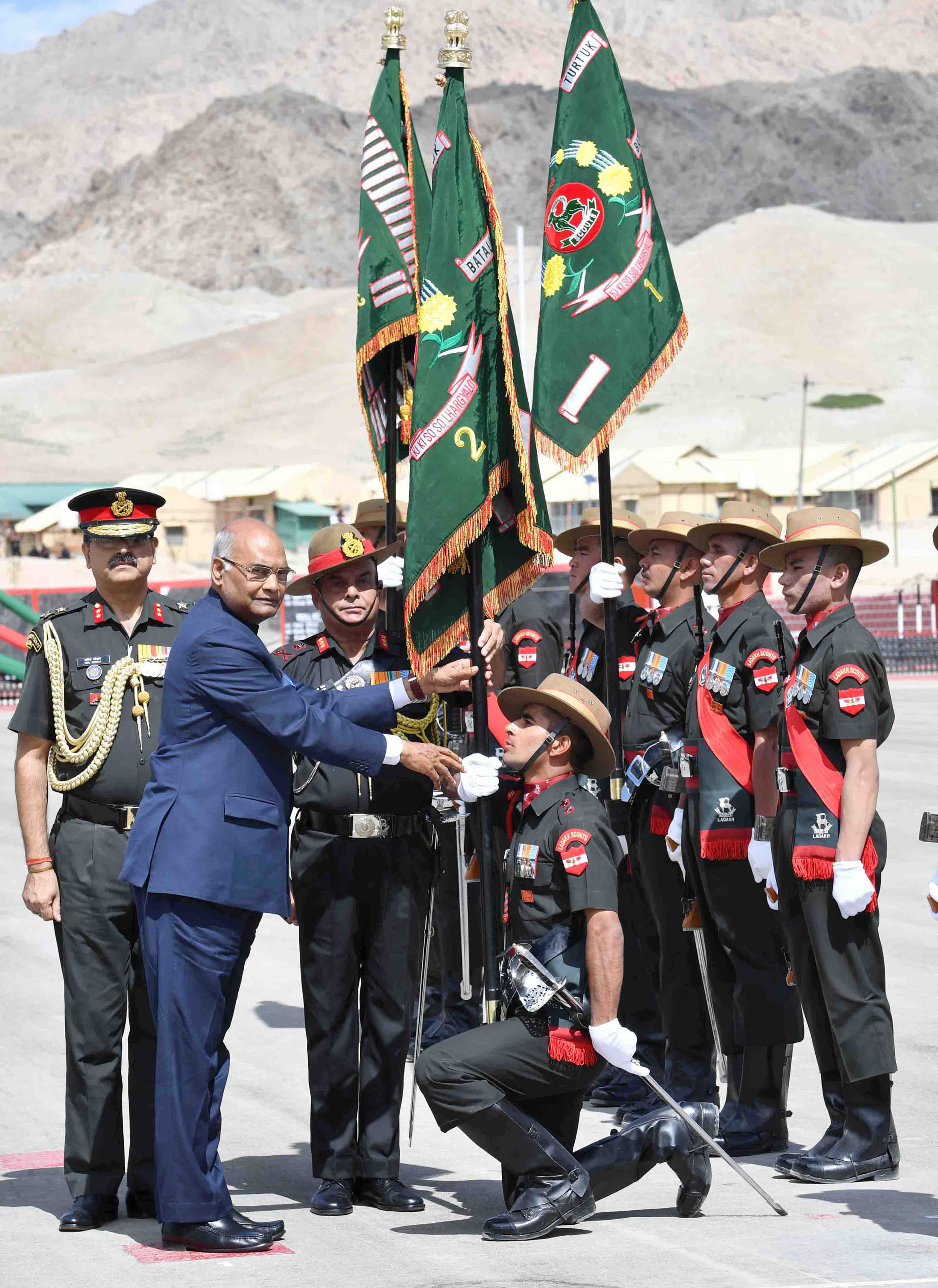
- Former President, Shri Ramnath Kovind presenting the prestigious President's Colours to all five Ladakh Scouts Battalions and Ladakh Scouts Regimental Centre, at Leh on 21 August 2017
- Type: Military, police decoration
- Description: Highest Military Honour, awarded to military unit.
- Country: India
- Presented by: President of India
- Eligibility: Minimum 25 years of service
- Established: 27 May 1951
- First award: 27 May 1951

The President's Colour Award is the highest honour that can be bestowed upon any military unit of India. It is also known as Nishaan, which is an emblem that is worn by all unit officers on the left-hand sleeve of their uniform.

The presentation of the award or standards by the Supreme Commander of the Armed Forces of India (President of India) is an acknowledgement of the unit's meritorious service. While the practice of carrying the Colour into battle has stopped, the tradition of receiving, holding and parading the Colour continues even today in the Armed forces. To this day, the President's Colours is very significant, if the unit lose their colours, it is a disgrace for that unit and, if the unit captured the enemy's colours then it is a great honour for that unit.

The 'Standards' are awarded to Heavy Cavalry and the 'Guidons' are awarded to Light Cavalry.

== History ==
In military organizations, the practice of carrying colours, standards or guidons, both to act as a rallying point for troops and to mark the location of the commander, is thought to have originated in Egypt some about 5,000 years ago.

In Indian context, 'Colours or Standards' are also known as 'Dhwajs or Patakas'. The concept of dhwajs has also roots in the 'Vedas' and 'Puranas'. The armies of the king or emperor were also carries the 'Dhwajs'. If the army lost its dhwaj to the hands of enemy, then it means disgrace and if the army capture the dhwaj of the enemy, then it means an honour. If the army accept the dhwajs of the King/Emperor, then it means that the army has accepted the supremacy of that King/Emperor.

In regiments of infantry of British Army and other armies of commonwealth nations, each battalion carries two colours, which collectively are called as stand. These are large flags 36in × 45in and mounted on a pike which is 8ft7½ in long; the king's/queen's version is usually the version of country's national flag, often trimmed with gold fabric, and with the regiment's insignia placed in the centre. The Regimental colour is a flag of a single colour, usually the colour of the uniform facing (collar/lapels/cuffs) of the regiment, again often trimmed and with the insignia in the centre. Most of the regiments that are designated as 'royal' regiments (that is either have the word 'Royal' or have the sponsorship of a royal personage in their name) have a navy blue colour Regimental Colour. Irish Regiments, today the Royal Irish Regiment, have a dark green Regimental Colour.

With East India Company coming under the control of the English, the regiments in India started as carrying colours of the British Crown. Later, it became the President's Colours.

India became a republic on 26 January 1950. One day earlier on 25 January, all 33 of the King's Colours which had been presented to the Indian Army, Royal Indian Navy, Royal Indian Air Force and their respective commands were "laid up" at the Indian Military Academy, Dehradun. From, 26 January 1950 onwards, the use of the prefix 'Royal' was discontinued. Later, they became the colours of the President of Republic of India.

On 27 February 1951, the Commander-in-Chief of the Indian Navy, Vice Admiral Sir Edward Parry, wrote to the defence minister Baldev Singh: "As you know that India became a Republic, Naval Custom was to parade the King's Colours ashore on the special ceremonial occasions. On and after 26 January 1950, however this practice was ceased and the ordinary Naval Ensign has been paraded instead. It would be a privilege of which the service would be extremely proud if the President of India would honour the Indian Navy by presenting to it a special flag which would be paraded on important occasions in the same manner as the King's Colours used to be."

Following the British tradition of the Navy being the senior of the three branches of the Indian Armed Forces, the Indian Navy was the first to presented with the President's Colours on 27 May 1951. In the years that followed, as the Navy grew in size and the function, President's Colours were presented to the Naval Commands and the Fleets.

The President's Colours/Standard/Guidon is one of the greatest honours bestowed upon in recognition of exceptional service rendered by it to the nation, both during war and peace.

== Design of the Colour ==
=== Army Unit Presidential Colour ===
The President's Colours of Indian Army infantry battalions (both regular line and rifle and scout infantry) follow the format of the line infantry regimental colours of the armies of the Commonwealth (and the King's/Queen's Colours of the Foot Guards of the British Army, in the case of the Brigade of the Guards). Each Colour is gold fringed and is brought out on major ceremonies. In the center, the heraldic badge and distinctive unit insignia of the reporting regiment is stationed, surrounded by wreaths in which the battalion motto can be seen. On the sides of the colour, which is in the facing colour of the regiment, are the recognized battle honours won by the battalion and the whole of the regiment. Some battle honours of the regiments of line, light and rifle infantry, granted prior to independence to units for battles or campaigns in India against the local rulers or nationalist forces, have been declared as 'repugnant' and are not celebrated or held in esteem, and as in the case of the President's Colours, are not displayed. The recognized battle honours are displayed on gold scrolls that surround the unit badge. Unlike the British Army, which does not have colours for the light infantry and rifle regiments, the Indian Army also has President's Colours present in some of these units (following the Russian precedent adopted after the 1971 Bangladesh Liberation War), with the first light infantry battalion colour being presented in 1968. These colours follow a similar design to that of the line infantry. The regimental centre colour, regardless of regiment, follows the same design as the battalion colour but with the heraldic arms of the regiment, and carries all the recognized battle honors of that regiment and the regimental motto instead of the battalion's.

The same design of colours is used by the combat and service support formations of the Army with the service or unit badge, motto and the battle honours.

=== Army Unit President's Standard/Guidon ===
The President's Standards and Guidons of Indian Army armoured and cavalry formations of the Indian Army Armoured Corps, smaller than the colours of the Infantry, have a similar design. All have gold fringe surrounding them, and the unit badge and its motto at the centre of it, surrounded by the recognized battle honors of the unit, all in the facing colour of the unit. The same case for repugnant honours goes for all of these formations of the Armoured Corps. The Standard of the Armoured Corps Centre carries all the Armoured Corps' recognized battle honours.

Units awarded the President's Standard have a design similar to the heavy cavalry regiments of the Commonwealth. Units however granted with the President's Guidon carry a similar design to those of the light cavalry regimental guidons, which are swallow-tailed.

=== Navy President's Colour ===
President's Colour of the Indian Navy

It was the Indian Navy that was the first branch of the Armed Forces to receive the President's Colour in May 1951, one year after India became a republic of the Commonwealth. This colour, the President's Colour of the Navy, is the basis of the President's colours of all commands and services of the Navy. It is also awarded to ground naval bases and, as the President's Standard, to all naval combat and service support formations.

Similar to the case of the Royal Navy, all colours share the identical design of the President's Colour, which in turn, is based on the former design of the Indian Naval Ensign. Unlike the RN Ensign the old design was unique that it has a golden elephant, symbol of the nation, on the bottom left side of the colour. It as always been in white and fringed in gold, with the national flag on the canton with the St. George's Cross, symbolizing the roots of the Navy in the Royal Indian Marine, with the State Emblem of India at the center, in gold, under which, written in Devanagari script, is the national motto Satyameva Jayate (Truth Alone Triumphs). There are no battle honours in the President's Colours unlike those in the other services.

In 2022 a new design of the President's Colours and Standards for the Navy and all naval commands, services and bases and formations was released to replace the old design. It retains much the design of the 2001-04 ensign and the gold fringe, but instead of the arms of that emblem, its feature on the fly is an octagonal navy blue shield—the official new heraldic emblem of the force—based on Chhatrapati Shivaji Maharaj's's royal seal surrounding the heraldic arms in gold, which also corrects a long omission from that ensign as well—the addition of, in Devanagari, the official motto of the Navy—May the Lord of Waters Be Auspicious Unto Us (Shaṁ No Varunaḥ). The shield is also gold fringed with two gold borders. The octagon represents the Navy's missions of national maritime defense and its multi-directional reach. The new design of the arms is the State Emblem atop a clear anchor in gold. Atop the emblem is the State Emblem and the national motto from the old design.

=== Air Force President's Colour/Standard ===
President's Colour of the Indian Air Force

All Indian Air Force air combat and combat support formations carry the President's Standard, which is in sky blue with the squadron or helicopter unit heraldic arms with the recognized battle honours given to these formations similar to those of the Army. Since it was established in 1932, there are no repugnant battle honours in these Standards, as the battle honours for these formations date beginning to the Second World War, the force's baptism of fire, and onwards.

The President's Colour is carried by Indian Air Force service support, education and training institutions and it uses the same design as in the President's Standard. It is also carried by air base and air station personnel and carries the same battle honours.

The Air Force itself has its own President's Colour—a gold fringed version of the official service ensign with the gold elephant on top of the air force roundel.

== The ceremony of presentation of colours ==
The formation for the ceremonial parade is a battalion-sized (100–500 soldiers) formation of military units of an armed forces formation (from either the navy, army and air force) or a law enforcement formation. Four to eight companies is the usual size of the parade and a military band combined with a pipe band providing the ceremonial music is present. The parade commander, the Field Officer holding the rank of a major or lieutenant colonel (commander or lieutenant commander in the navy, wing commander or squadron leader in the air force), takes his place in the center of the parade field, assisted by the Second-in-Command and the Parade Adjutant. All wear full dress uniform.

The President of India, the ceremony's guest of honour, arrives as the parade renders a full National Salute as the National Anthem Jana Gana Mana is played by the band and a 21-gun salute is fired (occasionally by the Indian Army Regiment of Artillery). After the anthem, the parade is inspected, as the band plays a slow march. If any old colours are present, they are marched out of the field for the final time as the new colours of the unit are about to replace these colours, and the parade renders a salute as the audience in the grandstand stands in respect and the President, together with the service chiefs, salutes it one final time.

Then, the Sarvadharma Samaroh begins. A drum altar had been formed by members of the band and the unit pipe band, and the new colour, which had already been removed of its cloth case, is brought there by the quartermaster of the unit. Afterwards, the Nishaan is consecrated by military chaplains of religions represented in the Armed Forces (Hinduism, Sikhism, Christianity and Islam). Then, the President's Colour is received by an officer designated as Nishan Adhikari on behalf of the military or police unit (in question) during the parade by the President or any other designated person on behalf of him or her, who serves as the unit ensign (holding rank of lieutenant in the Army, sublieutenant in the Navy and flying officer in the Air Force). Then, the ceremony ends with the National Anthem as the colour is marched into the parade formation, which salutes the colour. The drummers then return to their places in the band. Following that, the battalion marches past in quick time with the new colours before returning to their places. (If in the Navy, the Colour is dipped in the President's presence while marching past, and is recovered after passing the grandstand). If the parade marches past in slow time before the quick march segment the same pattern is observe with the sole exception of the Navy's colour which is also dipped in a slow time march.

With this portion being complete, the President or delegated reviewing officer will briefly address the regiment of which he/she presented the colours to, which will be concluded with the speaker expressing confidence in the unit, before that the unit commander makes his address of gratitude thanking the reviewing officer for their words and for their presence in the ceremony. After that, an Advance in Review Order is done, and one final National Salute is rendered. After the final salute, the battalion, together with the band and pipes and drums, marches off in quick time, and the colour guard squad marches off the field.

=== For Indian Armed Forces if the President is absent ===
In the absence of the President of India, the Vice President of India does not present colours to regiments, ships or air squadrons. The responsibility of being the guest of honour in his or her absence is prerogative of the Services Chiefs and as such, a General Salute is performed as the band plays appropriate music.

=== For federal and state police forces and organizations if the President is absent ===
When the president is absent, the federal Minister of Home Affairs or at times the Vice President or Prime Minister serves as delegate in any colour presentation ceremony to federal and/or state police forces. As such, a General Salute is performed by the parade assembled as the band plays appropriate music unless the National Anthem is played in the Vice President's presence.

Salutes are also given in a presentation ceremony to state governors who are acting on behalf of the President and in the name of their state governments.

== President's Colours awarded to the State and UT Police Forces ==
List of President's Colours awarded to the State and UT Police Forces
Sr no.	Police	Date and place	Awarded by	Info
1	Uttar Pradesh Police	23 November 1952, at Lucknow	Prime Minister Jawaharlal Nehru	UP Police celebrates the flag day every year on 23 November.
2	Delhi Police	1954, at Delhi	President Dr. Rajendra Prasad	
3	Maharashtra Police	1961, at Mumbai	Prime Minister Jawaharlal Nehru	
4	Nagaland Police	15 May 1985	Governor Gen K. V. Krishna Rao (Retd.)	
5	Jammu and Kashmir Police	26 June 2003, at Udhampur	President A. P. J. Abdul Kalam.	
6	Tripura Police	11 January 2012, at Agartala	Vice President Mohammad Hamid Ansari	On behalf of the President.
7	Gujarat Police	15 December 2019, at Gandhinagar	Vice President Venkaiah Naidu	
8	Himachal Pradesh Police	1 December 2021, at Shimla	Governor of Himachal Pradesh Shri Rajendra Vishwanath Arlekar	Status: Approved on 17 March 2019, 'Colours' presented on behalf of the President of India Shri Ramnath Kovind, first time a state governor has presented Colours
9	Assam Police	10 May 2022, at Guwahati	Union Home Minister Shri Amit Shah	On behalf of the President of India Shri Ramnath Kovind
10	Tamil Nadu Police	31 July 2022, at Chennai	Vice President Shri M. Venkaiah Naidu	Status: Approved on 19 August 2009
11	Haryana Police	14 February 2023	Union Home Minister Shri Amit Shah	Approved on 17 January 2022 and Awarded on 14 February 2023
12	Chhattisgarh Police	15 December 2024, at Raipur	Home Minister Amit Shah	
13	Sikkim Police	23 January 2026	Union Home Minister Shri Amit Shah	Status: Approved.
14	Meghalaya Police	02 April 2026	Home Minister Amit Shah	Status: Approved.
15	Odisha Police	02 April 2026	Home Minister Amit Shah	Status: Approved.
16	Uttarakhand Police	02 April 2026	Home Minister Amit Shah	Status: Approved.
17	Bihar Police	02 April 2026	Home Minister Amit Shah	Status: Approved.

=== Police commissionerates ===
List of President's Colours awarded to the Police Commissionerates
Sr no.	Police	Date and place	Awarded by	Info
1	Mumbai Police	1 December 1954	Morarji Desai, Chief Minister of then Bombay State.	

=== State Armed Police Forces ===
List of President's Colours awarded to the State Armed Police Forces
Sr no.	Police	Date and place	Awarded by	Info
1	Uttar Pradesh Provincial Armed Constabulary (UPPAC)	23 November 1952	Prime Minister Jawaharlal Nehru	
2	Maharashtra State Reserve Police Force (MSRPF)	6 March 2003, at Pune	Governor of Maharashtra Mohammed Fazal	"Regimental Colours"

== President's Colours awarded to the Forces of various Ministries of the Government of India ==
1. Ministry of Railways
  1. Railway Protection Force (RPF).
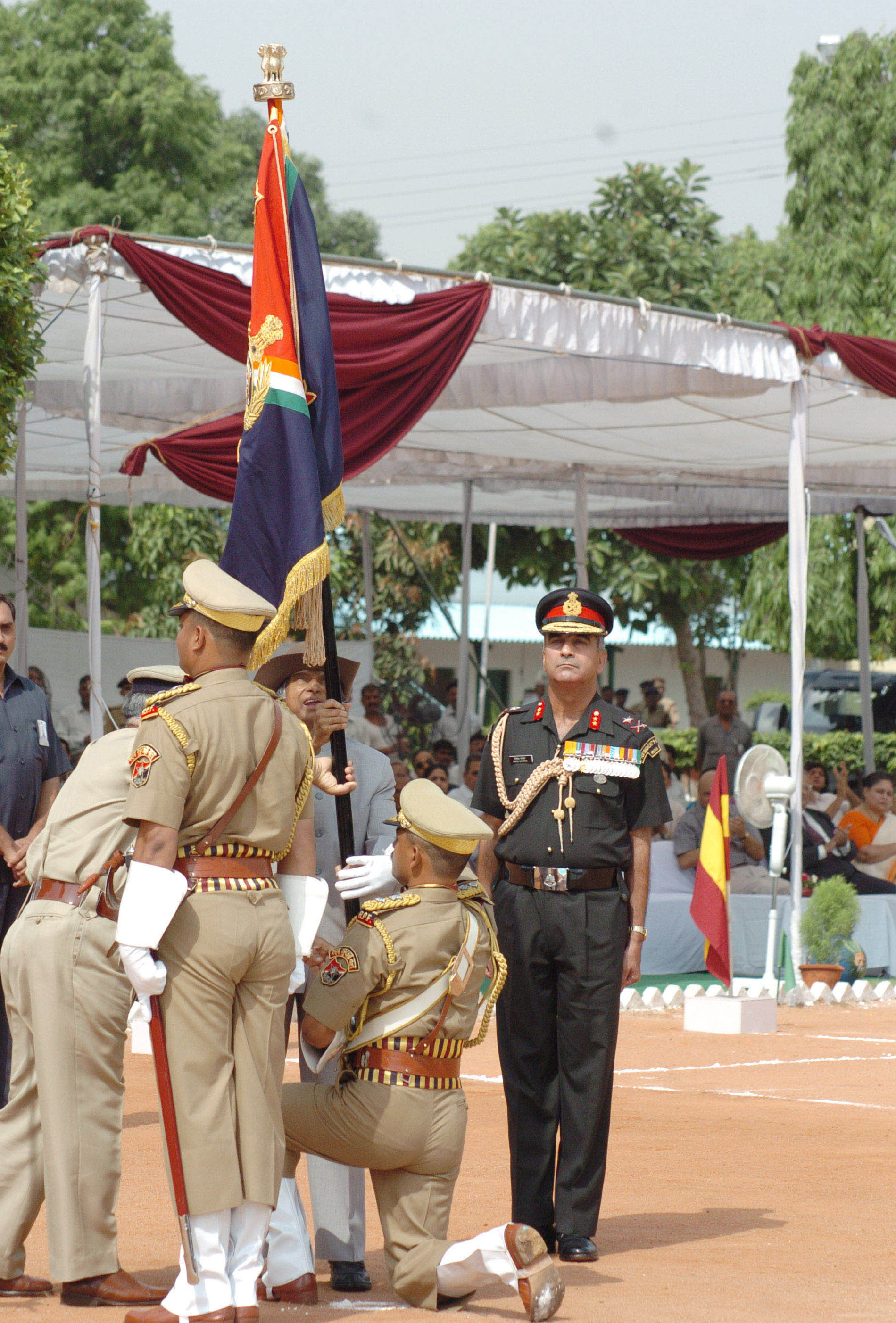
    The President, Dr. A.P.J. Abdul Kalam presenting the 'Colour' to the Railway Protection Force (RPF) at a Ceremonial Parade, in New Delhi, on May 22, 2006
    On 22 March 2006, the President of India A. P. J. Abdul Kalam awarded the President's Colours to the RPF, at New Delhi.
2. Ministry of Home Affairs (India)
  1. Central Armed Police Forces
    1. Central Reserve Police Force (CRPF).On 19 March 1950, Sardar Vallabhbhai Patel, the Home Minister of India presented the President's Colours to the CRPF. CRPF was the first CAPF which was awarded with the 'Colours'.
      1. Rapid Action Force (RAF).
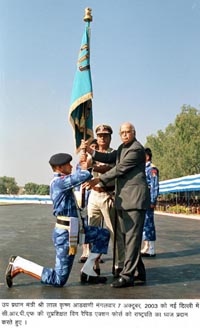
        The Deputy Prime Minister L. K. Advani presenting the prestigious 'Colours' to the RAF
        On 7 October 2003, L. K. Advani, the Deputy Prime Minister of India and the Home Minister of India presented the President's Colours to the RAF.
    2. Sashastra Seema Bal (SSB).
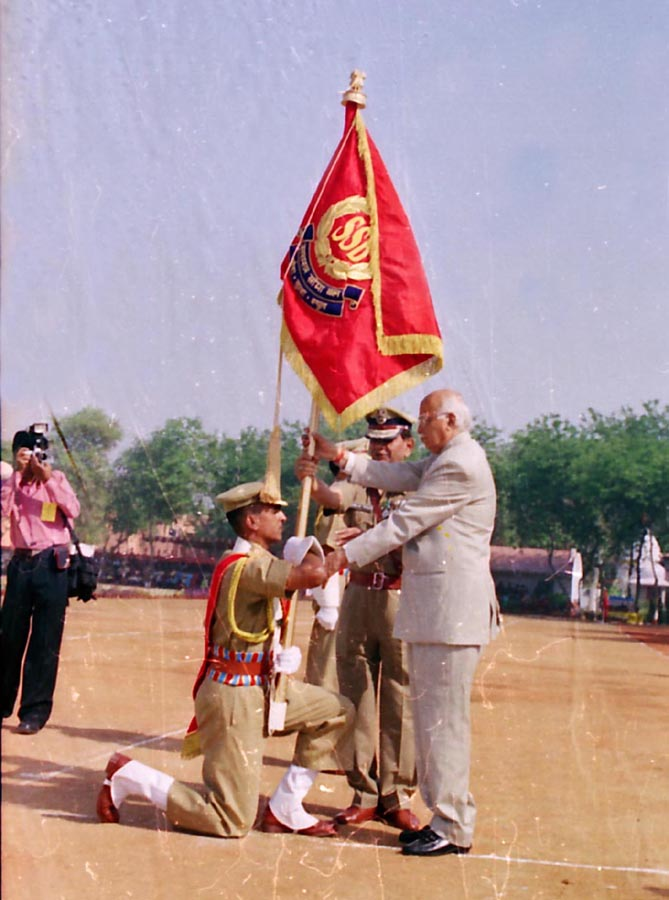
      The Deputy Prime Minister Shri L.K. Advani presenting the President's Colour to the Sashastra Seema Bal on the occasion of the 41st Anniversary of the Bal, in New Delhi, on March 27, 2004
      On 27 March 2004, the President's Colours were awarded to the SSB by the Deputy Prime Minister Shri L.K. Advani .
    3. Indo-Tibetan Border Police.
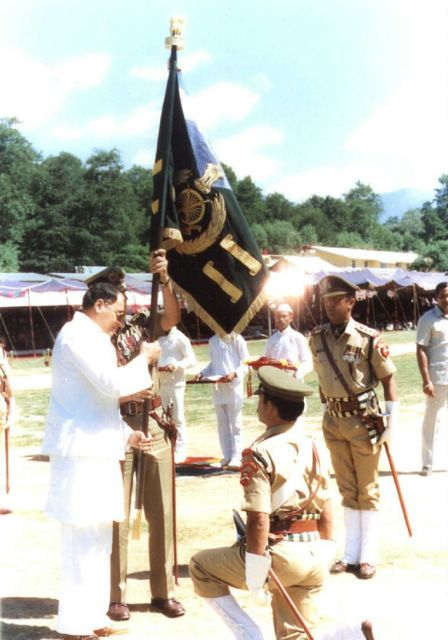
      PM Rajiv Gandhi presenting the 'colours' to the ITBP
      On 20 June 1987, Prime Minister Rajiv Gandhi presented the 'colors' to the ITBP.
    4. Central Industrial Security Force (CISF). was raised on 10 March 1969 and CISF celebrates its raising day every year on 10 March. The Prime Minister P. V. Narsimha Rao also presented the 'Colours' to the CISF on 10 March 1994, at Ghaziabad.
    5. Border Security Force. In March 1984, The 'colours' was presented by the Home Minister Prakash Chandra Sethi to the BSF.
  2. Assam Rifles. Assam Rifles was awarded with the 'COLOURS' by the Hon'ble President Giani Zail Singh on 29 Mar 1985.
  3. National Security Guards (NSG) (Special Forces of India).
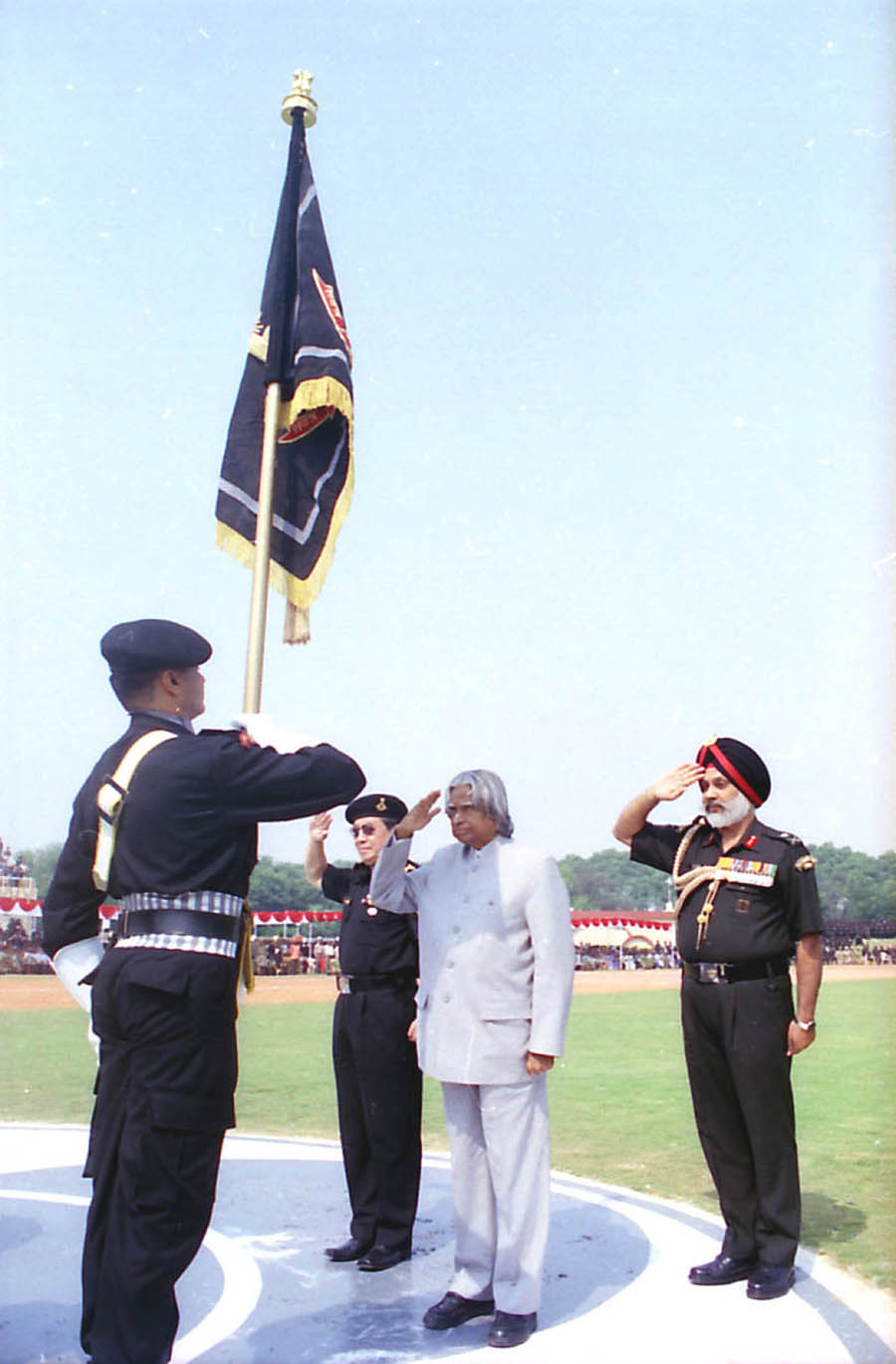
    President A. P. J. Abdul Kalam presenting the President's Colours to the NSG
    On 16 October 2004, the President's Colours were awarded to the NSG by the President A. P. J. Abdul Kalam at New Delhi.
  4. Sardar Vallabhbhai Patel National Police Academy (SVPNPA) On 15 September 1988, SVPNPA was awarded with the President's Colours.
  5. National Disaster Response Force On 14 May 2026, the President's Colours were awarded to the NDRF by the Home Minister Amit Shah at Ghaziabad, Uttar Pradesh.
3. Ministry of Defence
  1. Interservice Institutions of Defence
    1. Defence Services Staff College, Wellington, Tamil Nadu.
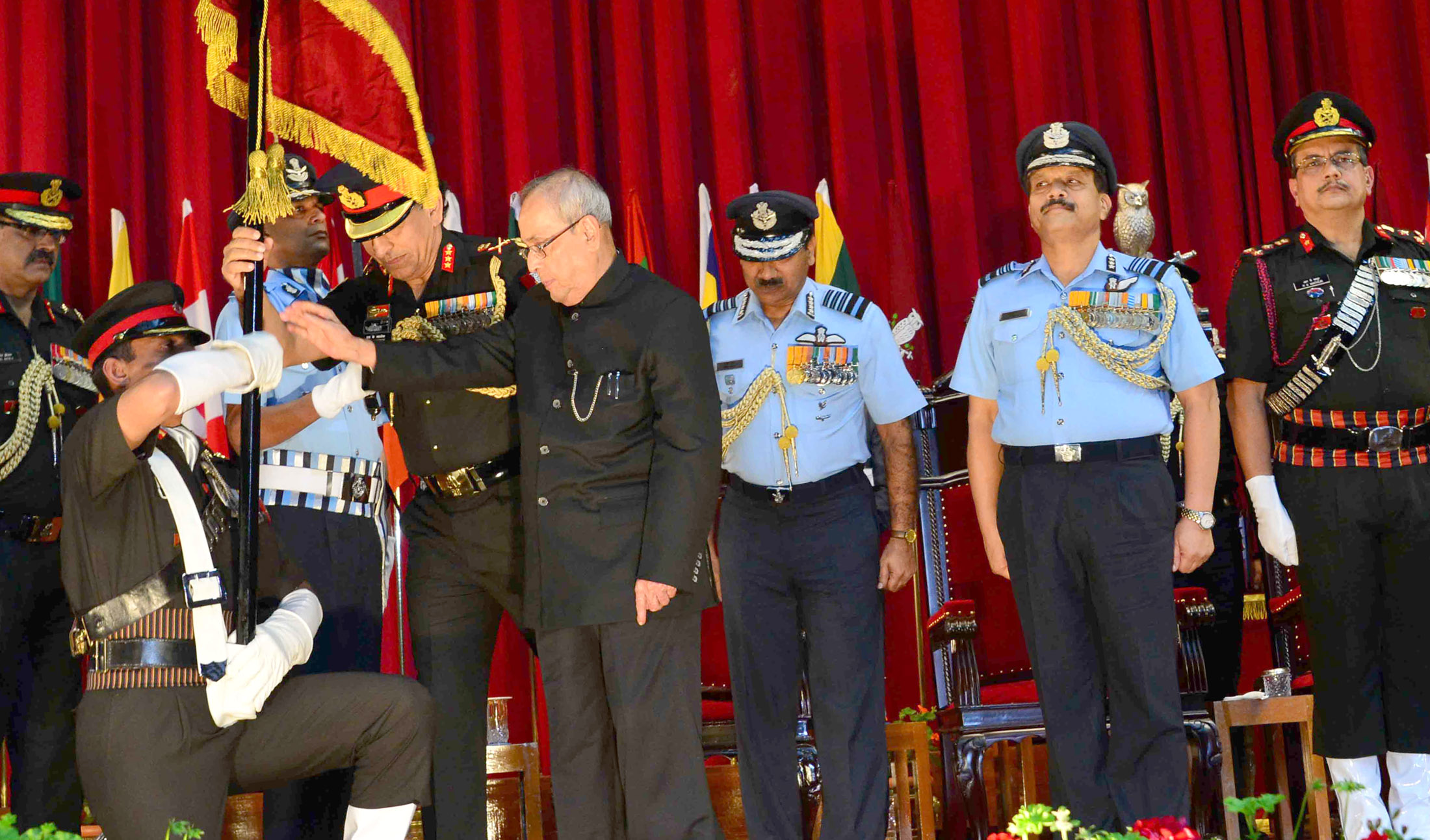
      The President, Shri Pranab Mukherjee presenting the Presidential Colours to the Defence Services Staff College, Wellington, Tamil Nadu
      Defence Services Staff College was awarded on 9 September 2016, by the President Pranab Mukherjee.

== President's Colours awarded to the Indian Armed Forces ==
=== Indian Coast Guard ===
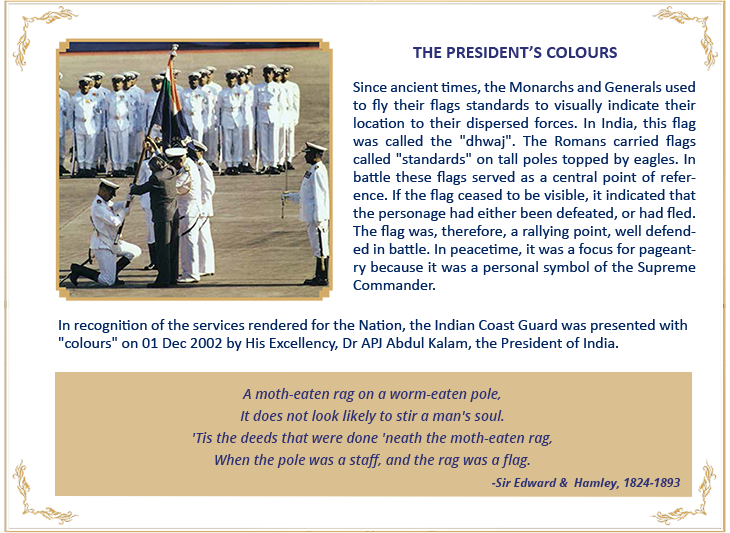
The President's Colour awarded to the Indian Coast Guard

On 1 December 2002, the President of India A. P. J. Abdul Kalam awarded the prestigious President's Colours to the Indian Coast Guard, at the Indian Coast Guard Air Station Daman.

=== Indian Army ===
- Infantry Regiments of the Indian Army
1. Madras Regiment.
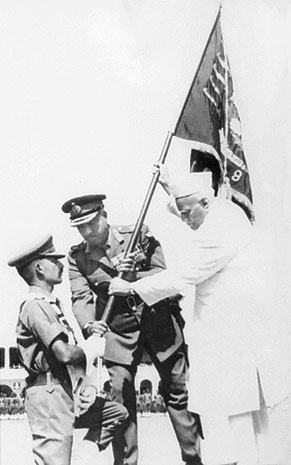
  President V. V. Giri presenting the 'Colours' to the 9th Battalion of the Madras Regiment
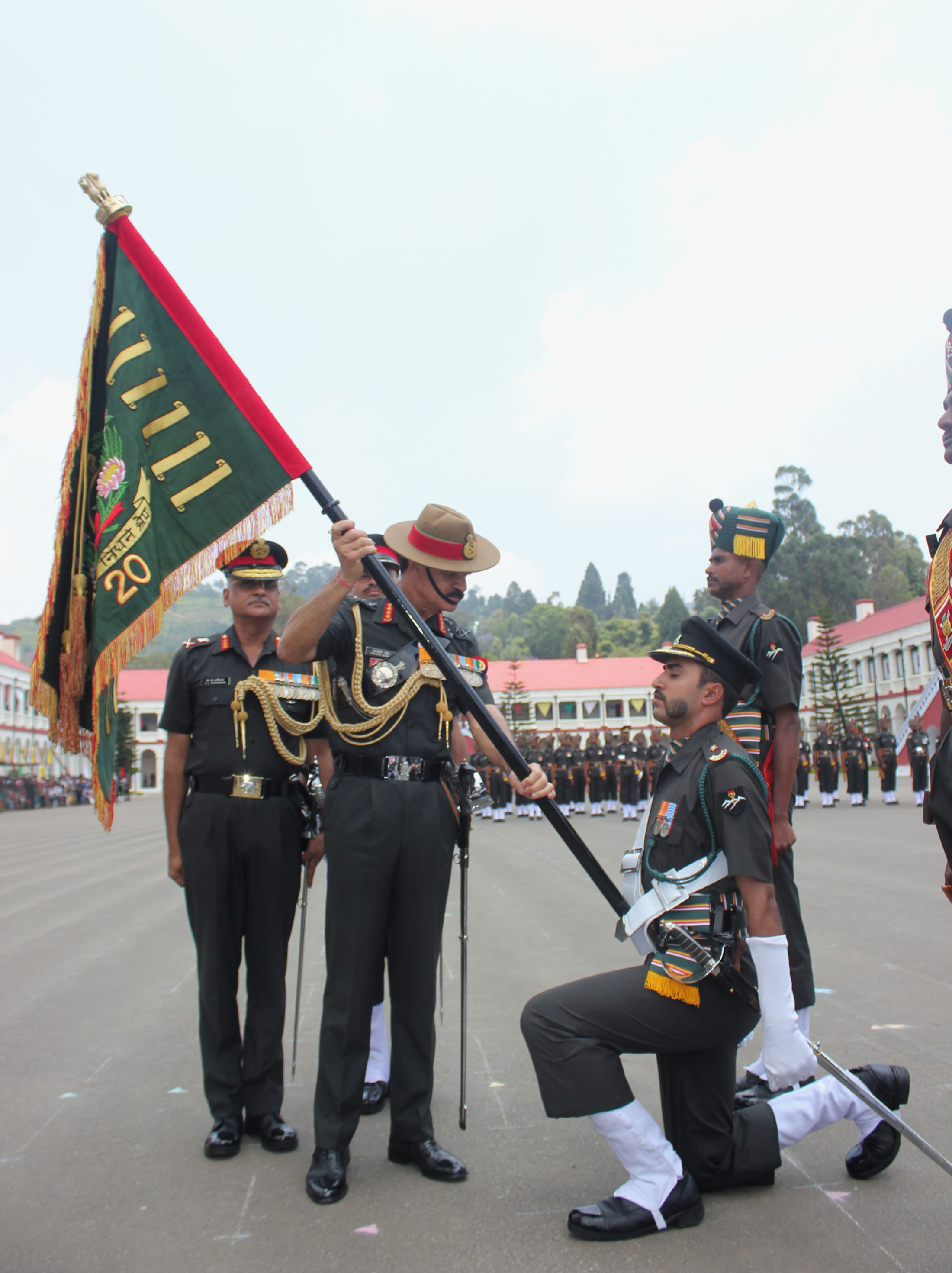
  The Chief of Army Staff, General Dalbir Singh presenting the President's Colours to 20 Madras Battalions of the Madras Regiment, in Tamil Nadu on 5 April 2015
  - Madras Regimental Centre with 15 Units of Madras Regiment were awarded on 23 May 1970, by the President V. V. Giri.
  - 27 Madras and 28 Madras were awarded on 23 September 1978, by the COAS Om Prakash Malhotra.
  - 11 Madras and 12 Madras on 19 May 1982, were awarded by the COAS Kotikalapudi Venkata Krishna Rao.
  - 10 Madras was awarded on 15 April 1988, by the COAS Krishnaswamy Sundarji.
  - 20 Madras Battalion and 21 Madras Battalion of Madras Regiment were awarded on 5 April 2015, at Wellington Military Station by General Dalbir Singh, Chief of Army Staff, on behalf of the President.
2. Punjab Regiment.
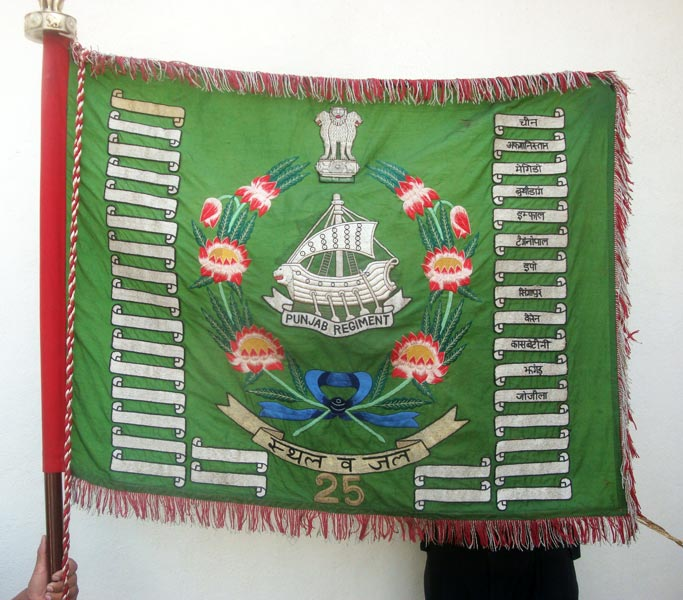
  Regimental Colours of the 25th Battalion of Punjab Regiment
  - On 18 Mar 1969, Dr Zakir Husain, the President of India, presented the new colours to the Punjab Regiment at Meerut.
  - On 16 Feb 1985, Gen AS Vaidya, Chief of the Army Staff presented colours to the three Battalions of the Punjab Regiment.
  - The 28 Punjab Regiment was presented colours on 3 February 2004 at a ceremony at the Kila Hari Drill Square at the Punjab Regimental Centre, Ramgarh Cantt by Gen NC Vij, Chief of the Army Staff.
  - On 25 September 2019, Army Chief General Bipin Rawat presented the 'President's Colours' to 29th and 30th battalions of the Punjab Regiment, on the behalf of the President of India, at the Punjab Regimental Centre, Ramgarh, Jharkhand .
3. Bihar Regiment.
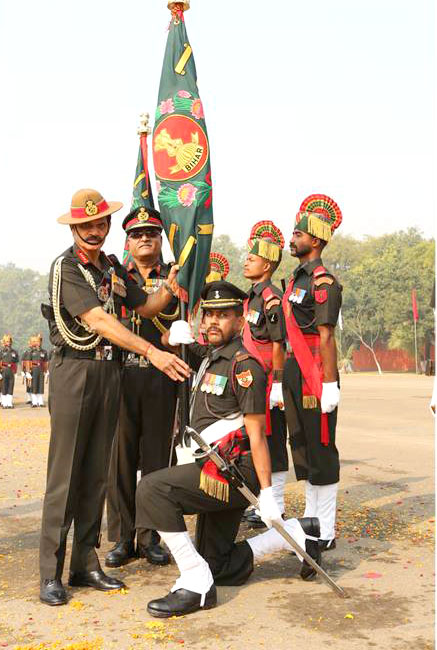
  The Chief of Army Staff, General Dalbir Singh presenting the President's Colours, at Bihar Regimental Centre, in Danapur on November 19, 2016
  - The first Colour presentation of the Regiment was held on 26 November 1970. G S Pathak, Vice President of India, during an impressive ceremonial parade presented new Colours to the centre and ten battalions.
  - On 29 November 1991, 16 BIHAR and 17 BIHAR were Presented Colours by the Chief of the Army Staff General SF Rodrigues.
  - General Dalbir Singh, the Chief of the Army Staff, on 19 November 2016, presented the President's Colours to the 18th, 19th and 20th battalions of the Bihar Regiment at the Bihar Regimental Centre, Danapur.
4. Kumaon Regiment.
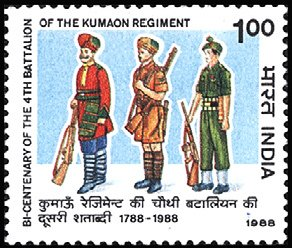
  Stamp of India—1988—Colnect 165236—4th Battalion of the Kumaon Regiment
  - 4 Kumaon was the first battalion of the Indian Army to be presented with the 'Colours' on 7 April 1961, by the first President of India, Dr Rajendra Prasad.
  - On 27 October 1970, in a ceremony where old colours were laid down and the new 'Colours' were presented by the President Varahagiri Venkata Giri, at Ranikhet.
5. Assam Regiment.
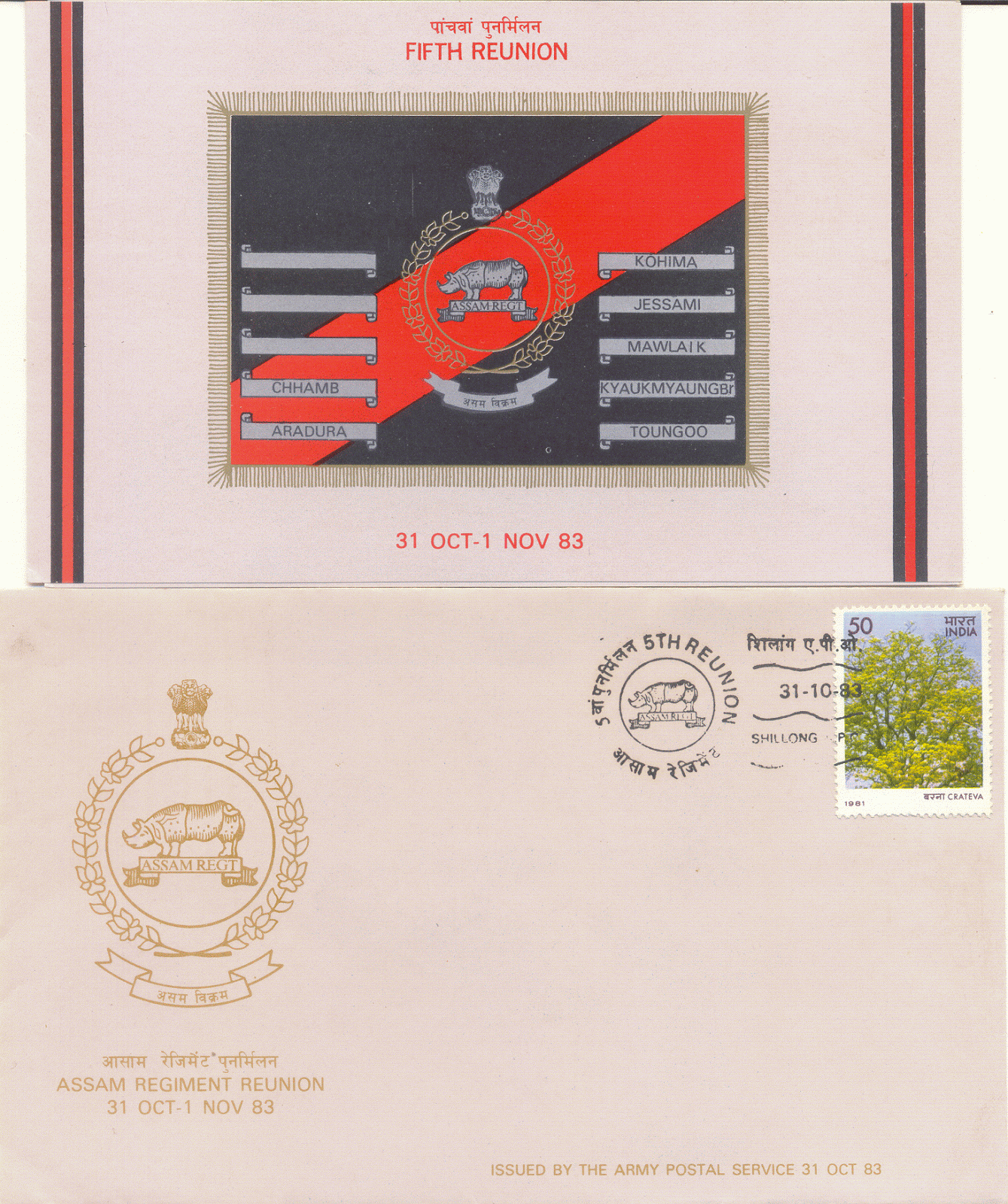
  Postcard: Assam Regiment 5th Reunion in Shillong (1983)
  - On 4 February 1976, President Fakhruddin Ali Ahmed presented new 'colours' to the Assam Regiment, at Jorhat.
  - General Dalbir Singh, COAS presented the 'colours' to the 16 & 17 ASSAM on 16 November 2016, at ARC Shillong.
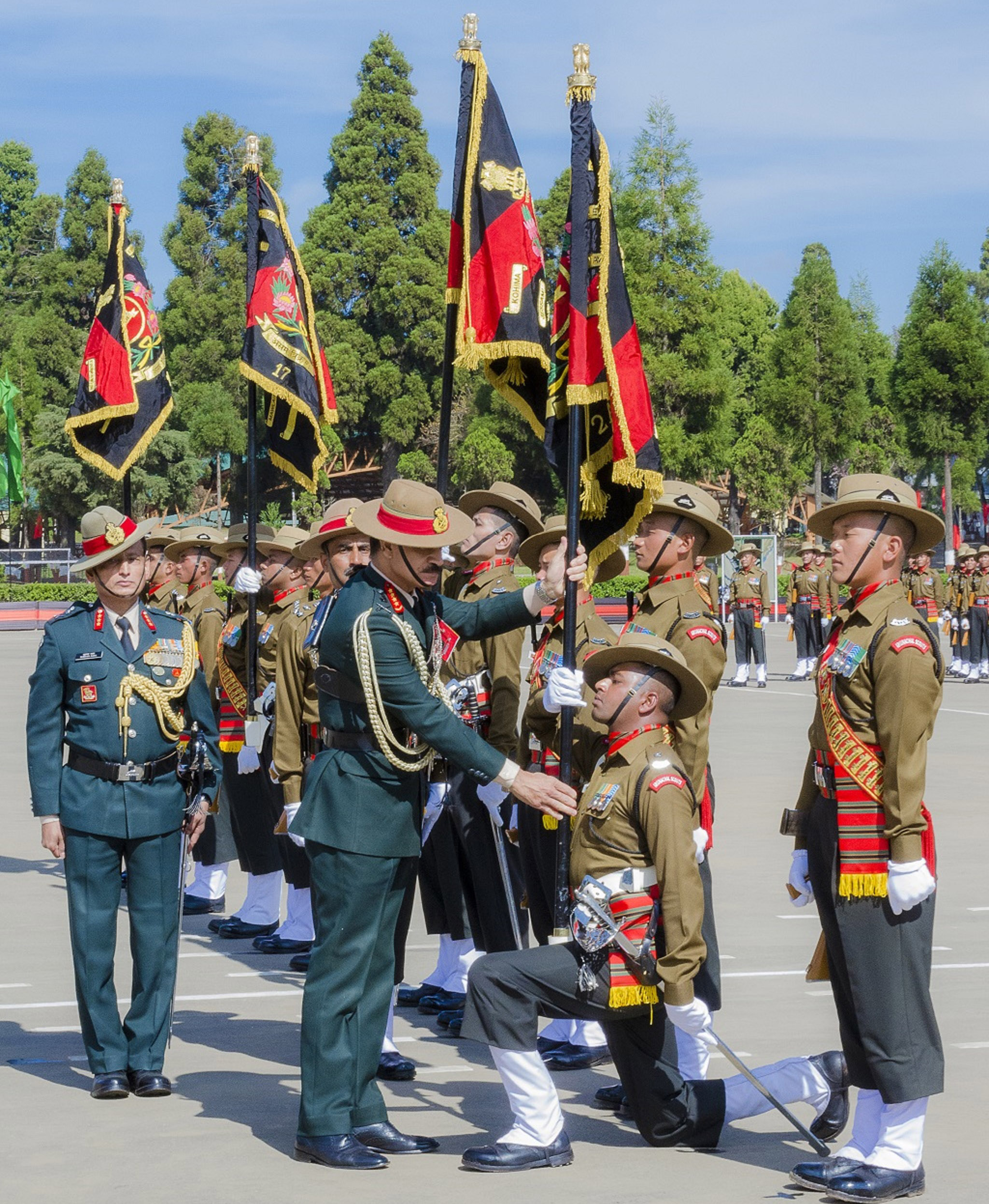
    The Chief of Army Staff, General Dalbir Singh presenting the colours to 16 ASSAM, 17 ASSAM, 1 & 2 Arunachal Scouts, at the Assam Regimental Center, Shillong, Meghalaya on 16 November 2016
6. Arunachal Scouts.
  - General Dalbir Singh, COAS presented the 'colours' to the 1 & 2 Arunachal Scouts on 16 November 2016, at ARC Shillong.
7. Ladakh Scouts.
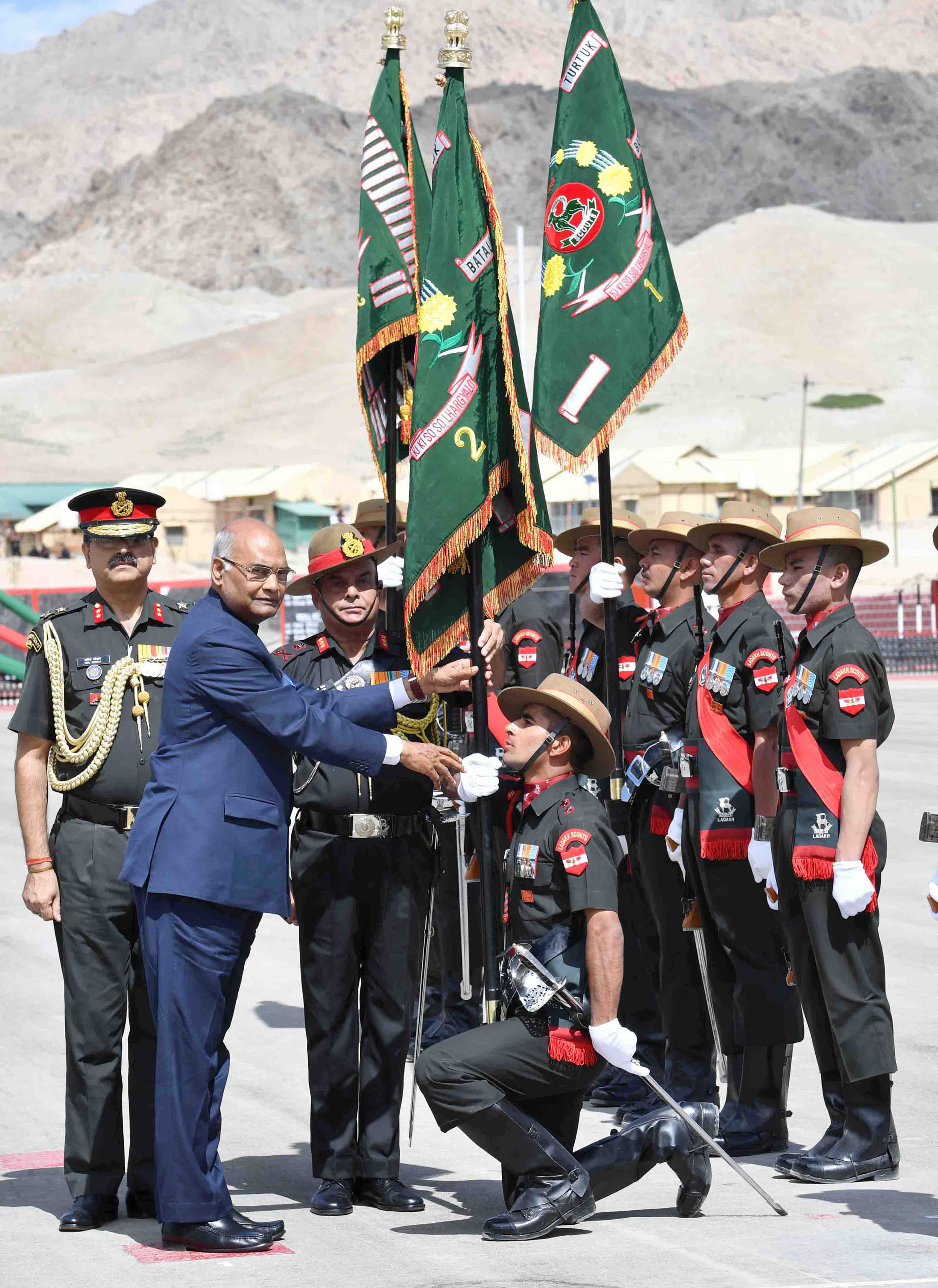
  The President, Shri Ram Nath Kovind presenting the President's Colours to all five Ladakh Scouts Battalions and Ladakh Scouts Regimental Centre, in Leh
  - Ladakh Scouts Regimental Centre and all five battalions of the Regiment were awarded on 27 August 2017, at Leh, Ladakh by President Ramnath Kovind.
8. Jat Regiment.
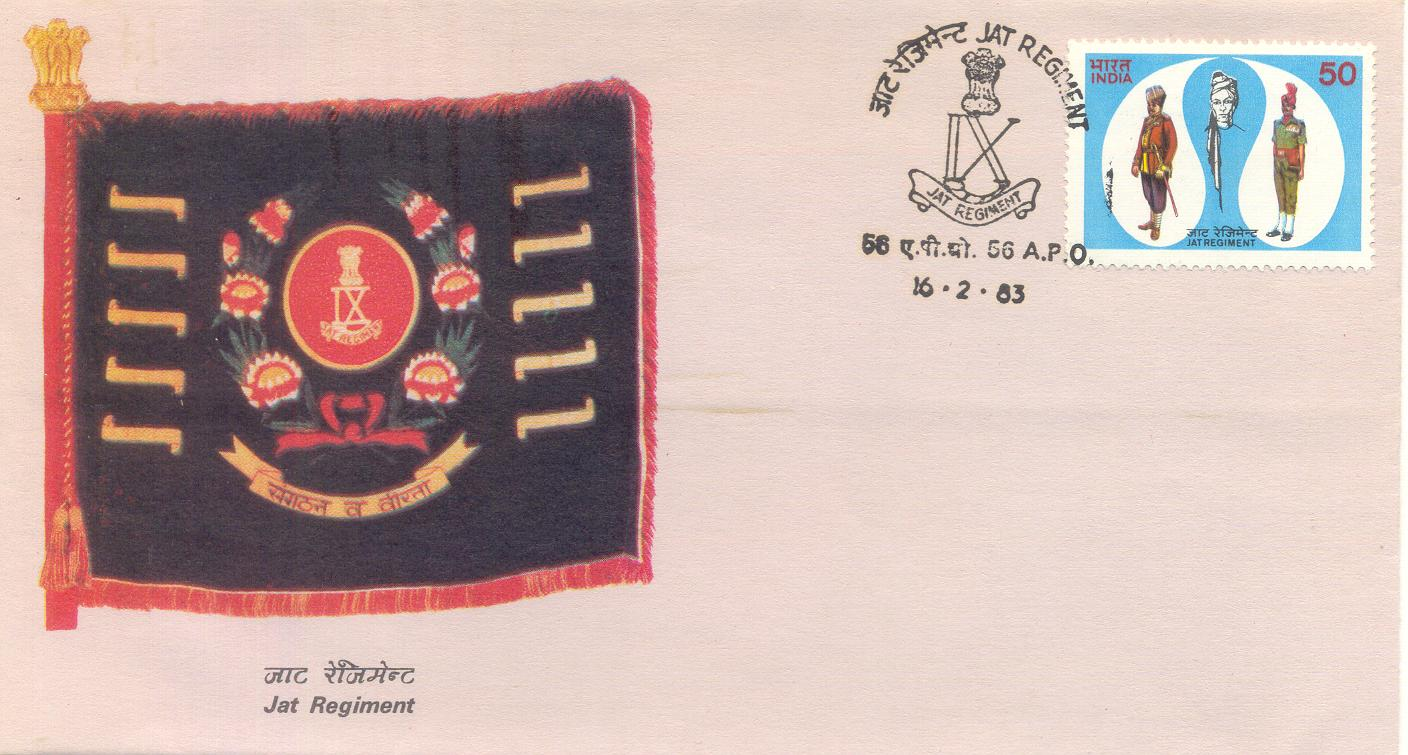
  Regimental Colours of the Jat Regiment
  - The First Indian Colours were presented to fourteen bns and the centre by President Dr Zakir Hussain on 23 Nov 1967 at the Jat Regt Centre, Bareilly. This also holds the record for the maximum number of colours given to Units during one Colour presentation ceremony.
    - The Units those awarded – 1st Bn, 2nd Bn, 3rd Bn, 4th Bn, 5th Bn, 6th Bn, 7th Bn, 8th Bn, 9th Bn, 11th Bn, 14th Bn, 16th Bn, 17th Bn & 18th Bn.
  - The second set of Colours was presented to three more bns of the Regt by Chief of Army Staff Gen KV Krishna Rao, PVSM, ADC on 23 Nov 1983 at The Jat Regt Centre, Bareilly.
    - The Units those awarded – 12th Bn, 15th Bn & 19th Bn.
  - The third set of Colours was given to the Regt during the bicentenary celebrations by Chief of Army Staff Gen Shankar Roy Choudhury, PVSM, ADC on 20 Nov 1995 at The Jat Regt Centre, Bareilly, with this set of colour presentations all the eighteen regular bns had received the President's Colours.
    - The Units those awarded – 20th Bn & 21st Bn.
  - 1 JAT (LI) which traces its history back to 1803 laid to rest its sixth colour (first after independence) given by President Dr Zakir Hussain on 23 Nov 1967 at JRC and received its seventh colour as 2 Mech Inf (1 JAT LI) on 22 Feb 1988 at Ahmednagar from President Dr R Venkatraman.
9. Rajput Regiment.
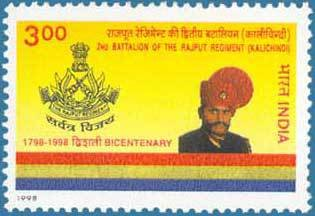
  Stamp of India - 1998 - Colnect 161889 - 2nd Battalion Rajput Regiment Kalichindi
  - On 17 November 1966, in a ceremony at Fatehgarh, Uttar Pradesh, old colours were laid down and the new 'colours' were awarded to the Rajput Regiment by then President Dr. S. Radhakrishnan.
10. Dogra Regiment.
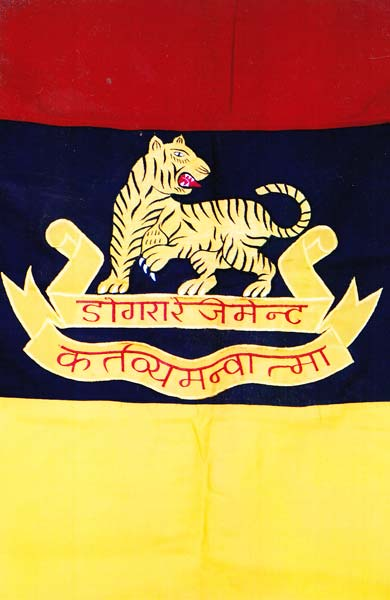
  Regimental Flag of the Dogra Regiment
  - On 8 November 1968, the President Dr. Zakir Husain presented new 'colours' to all battalions of the Dogra Regiment, and old colours received on 15 February 1930 were laid to rest at the Dogra Regimental Centre, Meerut.
  - On 24 November 1979, the COAS, General Om Prakash Malhotra presented the 'colours' to the 11th & 12th Battalion of the Dogra Regiment.
  - On 18 February 1984, the COAS, General A S Vaidya presented the 'colours' to the 17th Dogra Battalion at Faizabad.
  - On 3 March 1993, the COAS, General Sunith Francis Rodrigues presented the 'colours' to the 18th Dogra Battalion.
  - On 22 February 2003, the COAS, General N C Vij presented the 'colours' to the 16th Battalion.
  - On 24 March 2022, the COAS, General Manoj Mukund Naravane presented the 'colours' to the 20 DOGRA & 21 DOGRA battalions, at Faizabad, UP, in the presence of Former COAS General (Retd.) NC Vij.
11. Sikh Regiment.
  - On 2 March 1968, the Sikh Regiment was awarded with new colours by then President Zakir Hussain, at Meerut.
12. Mahar Regiment.
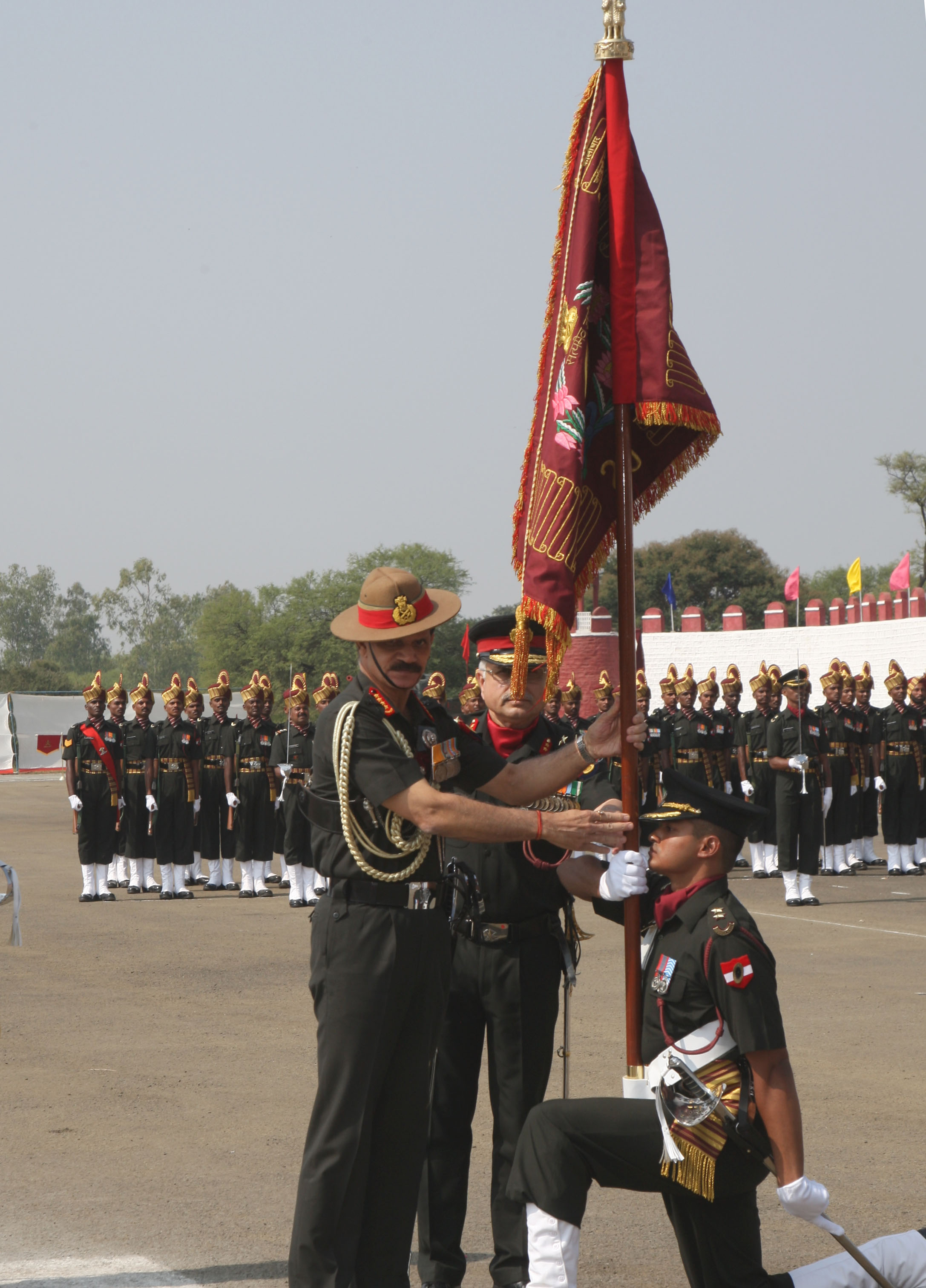
  The Chief of Army Staff, General Dalbir Singh presenting the 'President's Colours' to 20 Mahar Battalion of the Mahar Regiment, on the occasion of Platinum Jubilee of the Regiment, at Saugor Military Station, in Sagar
  - On 3 February 1970, President V. V. Giri presented the new 'colours' to the Mahar Regiment, at Sagar.
  - 20 MAHAR and 21 MAHAR Battalions of the Mahar Regiment were awarded on 4 November 2016, at Saugor Military Station by General Dalbir Singh, Chief of Army Staff, on behalf of the President.
13. Naga Regiment.
  - 1 Naga was presented with the 'Colours' on 6 May 1978 at Dehradun by Shri Neelam Sanjiva Reddy, the President of India.
  - 2 Naga was presented with the 'Colours' on 10 May 1990 by Gen Vishwa Nath Sharma, the Chief of the Army Staff.
14. Jammu and Kashmir Light Infantry.
  - On 9 October 1998, the President K. R. Narayan presented the'colours'to the Jammu and Kashmir Light Infantry.
  - On 4 November 2006, the COAS General J. J. Singh presented the President's 'colours' to the 17th battalion of the Jammu and Kashmir Light Infantry (JAKLI) Regiment.
15. Sikh Light Infantry.
  - The President of India, Dr Neelam Sanjeeva Reddy, presented the "Colours" to the 2 Sikh LI on 14 December 1981.
16. Maratha Light Infantry.
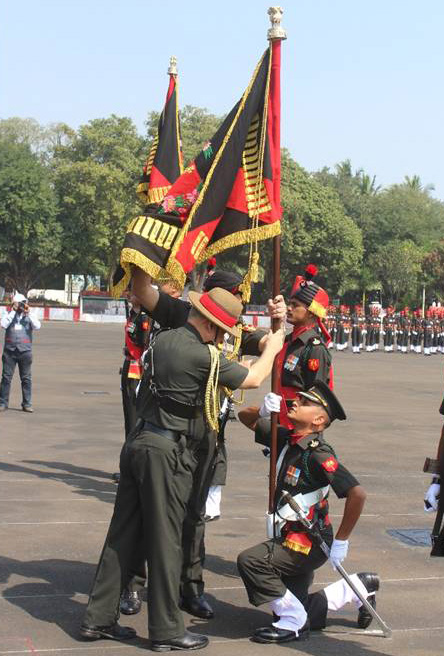
  The Chief of Army Staff, General Bipin Rawat presenting the president's colour, at Belgaum, Karnataka
  - In 1968, the new 'colours' were presented to the regiment by President Zakir Hussain.
    - In 1968, 9th Maratha LI was awarded with the President's Colours by the President Zakir Hussain and was received by Gen JJ Singh (later COAS).
  - 23 Maratha Light Infantry and 24 Maratha Light Infantry were presented the President's Colours at the Maratha Light Infantry Regimental Centre on 4 November 2017 by the COAS, General Bipin Rawat on behalf of the President Ramnath Kovind.
17. The Grenadiers.
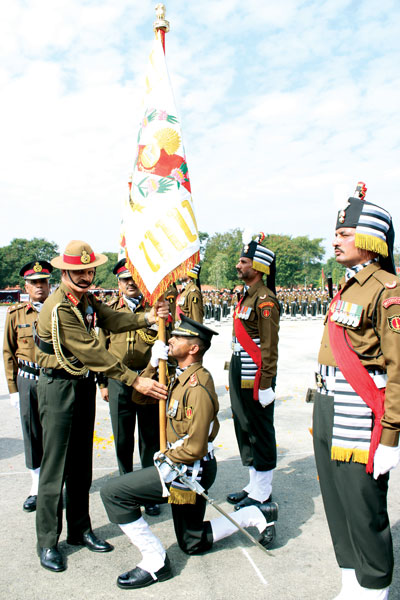
  COAS Dalbir Singh presenting the 'colours' to the 24 Grenadiers
  - On 19 December 1964, President Dr. S. Radhakrishnan presented new Regimental Colours to all battalions of the Grenadiers Regiment of the Indian Army at a ceremonial parade at the Regimental Centre at Nasirabad.
  - On 10 December 2015, The COAS, General Dalbir Singh awarded the 'colours' to the 23 Grenadiers and the 24 Grenadiers, at Jabalpur.
18. Parachute Regiment (SF).
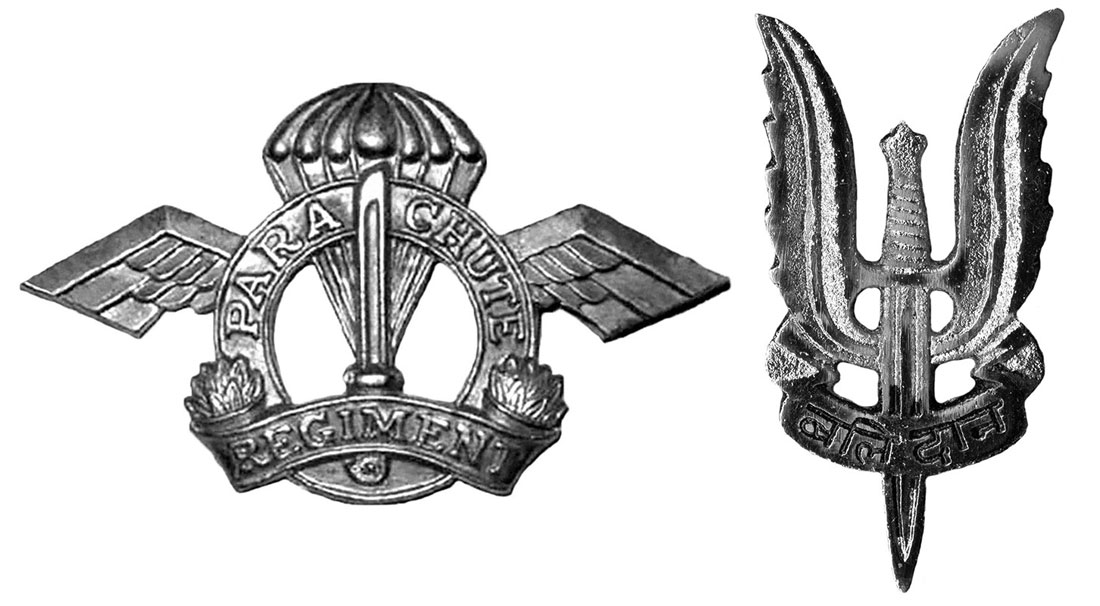
  Indian Parachute Regiment Insignia and PARA (SF) Battalion Insignia
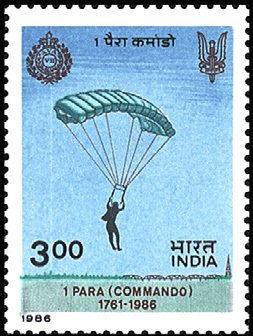
  Stamp of India – 1986 – Colnect 167166 – 1 Para Commando Parachute Regiment
  - On 6 October 1967, President Zakir Hussain presented the new 'colours' to the Parachute Regiment, at Gwalior, MP.
  - COAS General MM Naravane presented the 'President's Colours' to four parachute battalions – 11 PARA (Special Forces), 21 PARA (Special Forces), 23 PARA and 29 PARA – at the Parachute Regiment Training Centre in Bengaluru on 23 February 2022.
- Mechanised Regiments
1. Mechanised Infantry Regiment
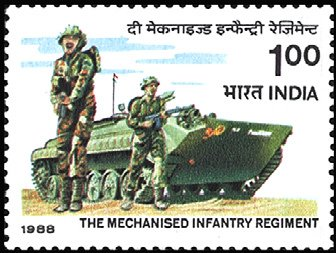
  Stamp of India – 1988 – Colnect 165238 – The Mechanised Infantry Regiment
  - The President Colours were awarded to the Regiment on 24 February 1988 at Mechanised Infantry Regimental Centre (MIRe), Ahmednagar, in a unique parade where 14 Colours were laid down and 24 Colours presented.
    - 2 Mech Inf (1 JAT LI) was awarded with colours on 22 Feb 1988 at Ahmednagar from President Dr R Venkatraman.
  - Mech Inf was presented Colours on 4 Dec 1996 at Jodhpur by General Shankar Roy Chowdhary, PVSM, ADC, Chief of the Army Staff.
2. The Brigade of the Guards.
  - 4 Guards Mechanised (1 Rajput) was awarded with the President's Colours on its establishment on 1950.
  - First Guards (2 Punjab) was presented with the Colors by President, Dr S. Radhakrishnan at Red Fort, New Delhi on 26 September 1962. Also, 1 GUARDS (2 PUNJAB) has the distinction of being the first and only battalion to receive Colours from the President in front of the Red Fort.
  - The Centre and the 2nd to 14th battalions received Colours from the President at Kota on 16 Mar 1973 at a huge, colourful ceremony, one of the largest ever.
  - 15 to 19 GUARDS were presented with colours by successive COAS at Kamptee.
- Regiments of the Indian Army Armoured Corps
1. President's Bodyguard
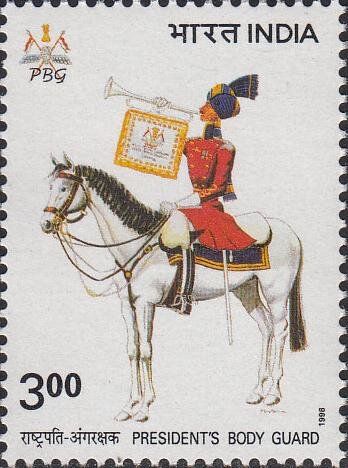
  Stamp of India – 1998 – Colnect 161887 – 225th anniversary of the President's Bodyguard cavalry regiment
  - Ist Silver Trumpet and Trumpet Banner. On 14 May 1957, Dr Rajendra Prasad, the first President of India, presented his Silver Trumpet and Trumpet Banner to the President's Bodyguard.
    - Dr. Prasad's personal standard was presented to the regiment on 18 Jan 1958 by the President himself, which was later abolished in 1971.
    - In November 1958, The President Dr. Rajendra Prasad presented a new Regimental Standard to the PBG, the previous Regimental Standard having been laid up after India became a republic. The old regimental standard rests in the Regiment's Officer's mess.
  - 2nd Silver Trumpet and Trumpet Banner. When the second President of India, Dr. Sarvepalli Radhakrishnan assumed the office, he presented his banner to the President's Bodyguard on 21 October 1962.
    - The new President's Standard and the Regimental Standard were awarded to the President's Bodyguard by the President Dr. S. Radhakrishnan on 11 November 1963.
  - 3rd Silver Trumpet and Trumpet Banner. The president had approved the presentation of the Silver Trumpet and Trumpet Banner but the ceremony could not be held due to his untimely demise.
    The trumpet and trumpet banner were later presented informally, with respect to the presidency of Dr. Zakir Husain (1967–69).
  - 4th Silver Trumpet and Trumpet Banner. President Varahagiri Venkata Giri presented the Silver Trumpet and Trumpet Banner to the President's Bodyguard at New Delhi.
  - 5th Silver Trumpet and Trumpet Banner. On 24 December 1978, President Dr. Neelam Sanjiva Reddy presented the Silver Trumpet and Trumpet Banner to the President's Bodyguard at New Delhi.
  - 6th Silver Trumpet and Trumpet Banner. On 6 October 1983, President Dr. Giani Zail Singh presented the Silver Trumpet and Trumpet Banner to the President's Bodyguard at New Delhi.
  - 7th Silver Trumpet and Trumpet Banner. On 24 October 1988, President Dr. Ramaswamy Venkataraman presented the Silver Trumpet and Trumpet Banner to the President's Bodyguard at New Delhi.
  - 8th Silver Trumpet and Trumpet Banner. On 18 October 1993, President Dr. Shankar Dayal Sharma presented the Silver Trumpet and Trumpet Banner to the President's Bodyguard at New Delhi.
  - 9th Silver Trumpet and Trumpet Banner. On 18 November 1998, the President Shri K. R. Narayan presented the Silver Trumpet and Trumpet Banner to the President's Bodyguard at the Rashtrapati Bhavan, New Delhi.
  - 10th Silver Trumpet and Trumpet Banner.
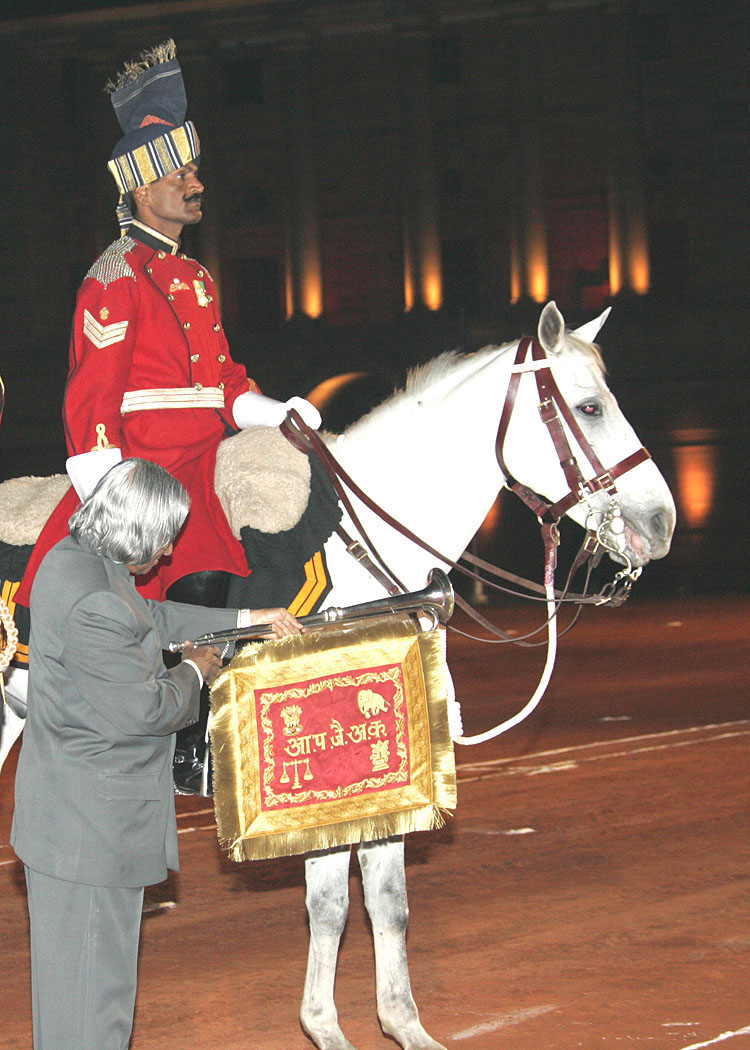
    The President Dr. A. P. J. Abdul Kalam presenting the Silver Trumpet and Trumpet Banner to the President's Bodyguard at a ceremonial parade at the Forecourt of Rashtrapati Bhavan in New Delhi on December 2, 2005
    On 2 December 2005, The President of India Dr. A. P. J. Abdul Kalam presented the 10th Silver Trumpet and Trumpet Banner to the President's Bodyguard
  - 11th Silver Trumpet and Trumpet Banner.
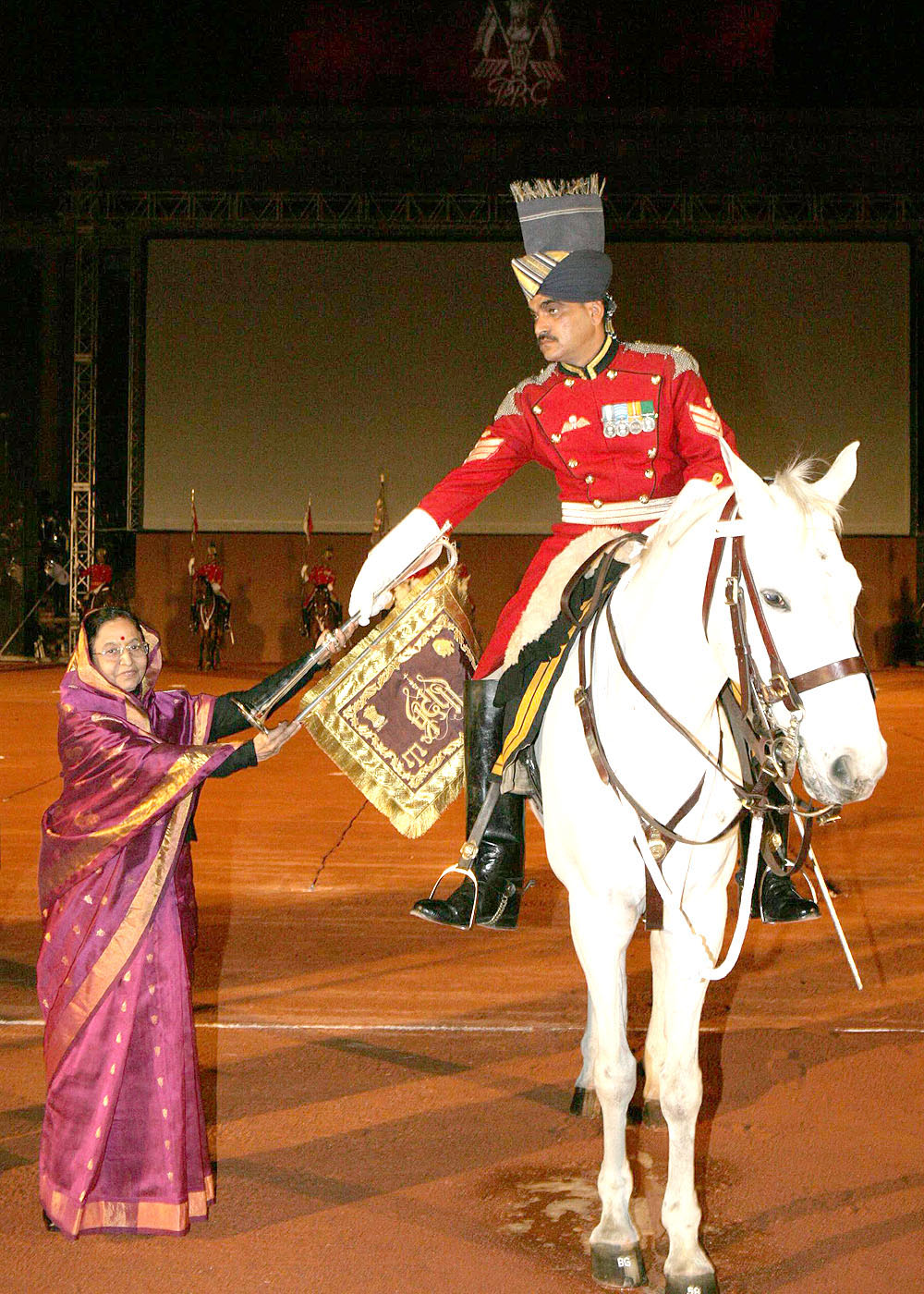
    The President, Smt. Pratibha Devisingh Patil presenting the Trumpet and the Banner to the President's Bodyguard, at a ceremony held at the Forecourt of Rashtrapati Bhavan, in New Delhi on March 1, 2008
    On 2 March 2008, The President of India Smt. Pratibha Patil presented the Silver Trumpet and Trumpet Banner to the President's Bodyguard in an impressive ceremony held at the forecourt of the Rashtrapati Bhavan.
  - 12th Silver Trumpet and Trumpet Banner.
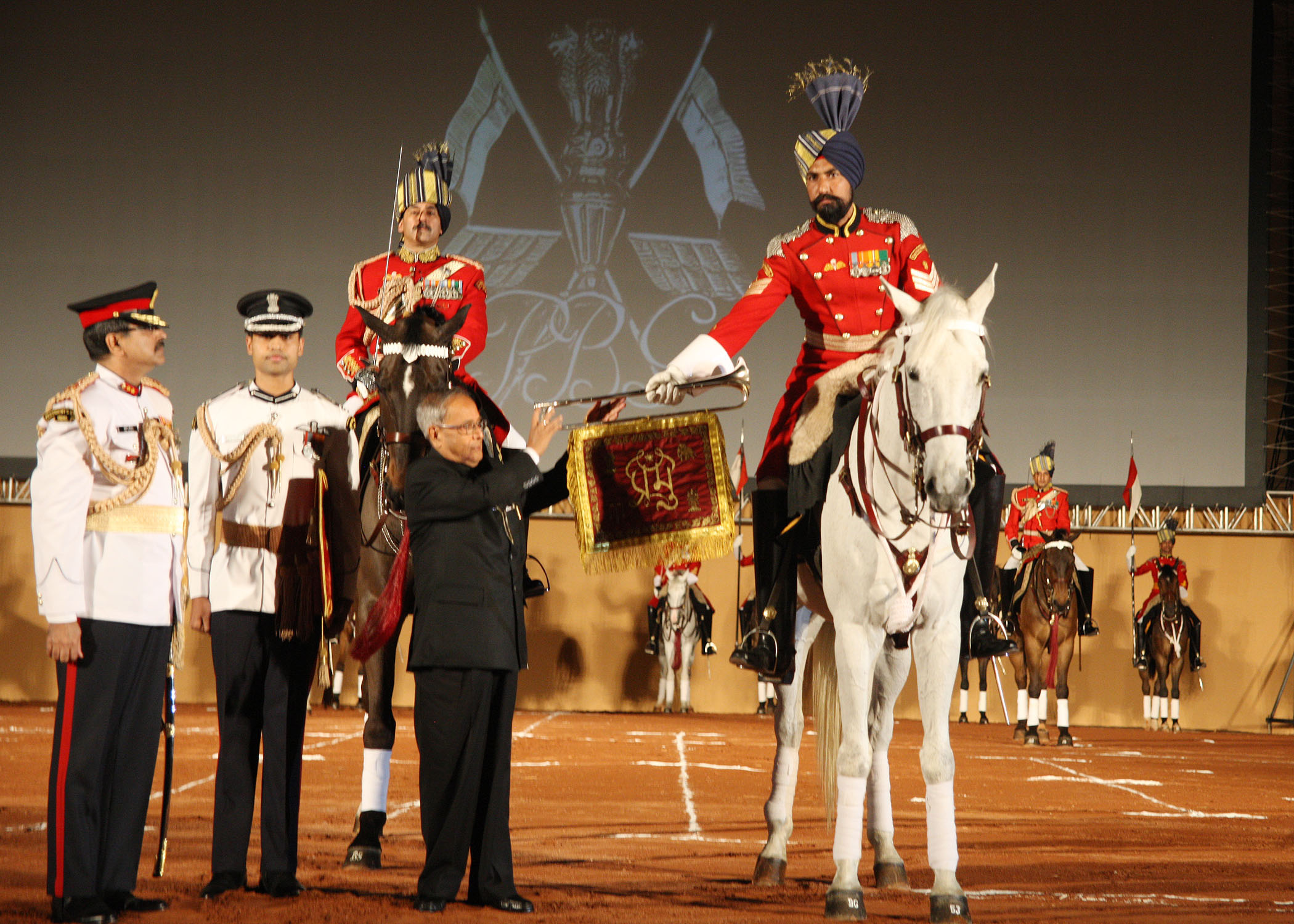
    The President, Shri Pranab Mukherjee presenting the Silver Trumpet and Trumpet Banner to the President's Bodyguard (PBG) at the Forecourt of Rashtrapati Bhavan, in New Delhi on March 30, 2013
    On 31 March 2013, The President of India Shri Pranab Mukherjee presented the Silver Trumpet and Trumpet Banner to the elite President's Bodyguard (PBG) in a colourful ceremony held at Rashtrapati Bhavan.
  - 13th Silver Trumpet and Trumpet Banner.
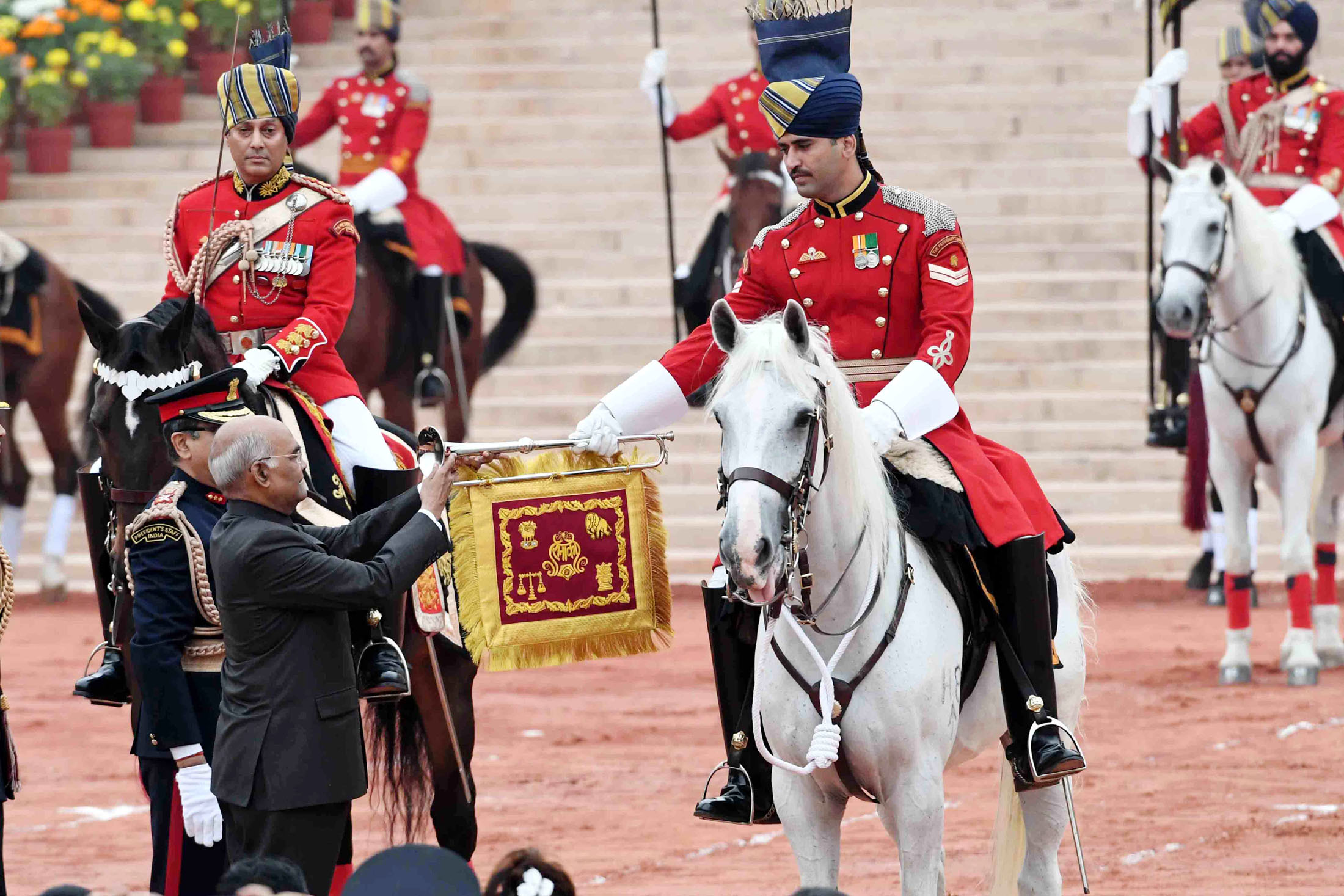
    The President, Shri Ramnath Kovind presenting the silver trumpet and trumpet banner to the President's Bodyguard (PBG), at Rashtrapati Bhavan, in New Delhi on November 17, 2017
    On 17 November 2017, The President of India, Shri Ram Nath Kovind, presented the Silver Trumpet and Trumpet Banner to the President's Bodyguard at a ceremony held at Rashtrapati Bhavan.
  - 14th Silver Trumpet and Trumpet Banner. On 27 October 2022, The President of India, Smt. Droupadi Murmu, presented the Silver Trumpet and Trumpet Banner to the PBG at a ceremony held at Rashtrapati Bhavan.
2. Indian Army Armoured Corps Centre and School.

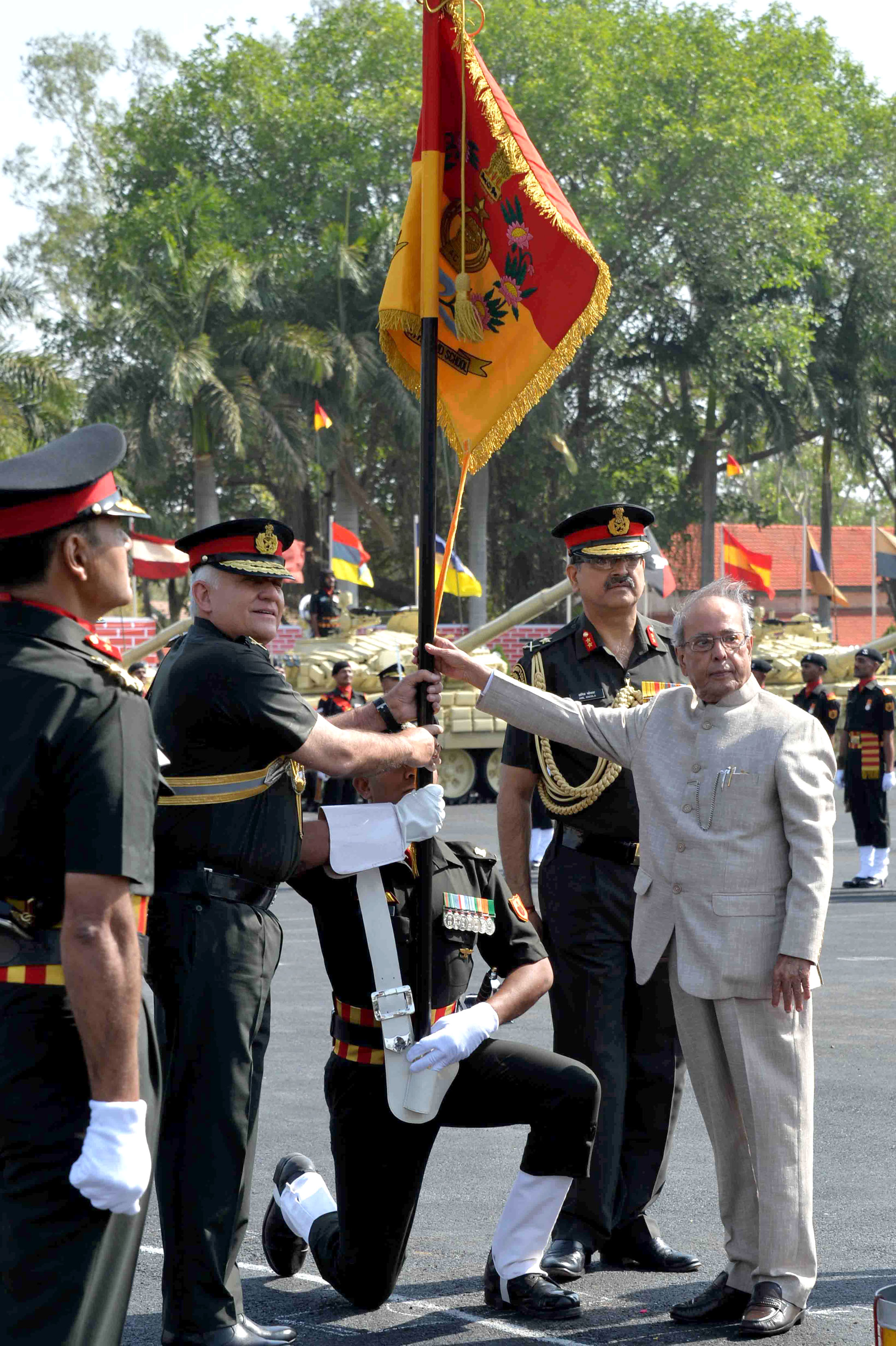
The President, Shri Pranab Mukherjee presenting the Standard to Armoured Corps Centre and School, Ahmednagar on 15 April 2017

The Honorable President of India and Supreme Commander of the Armed Forces, Shri Pranab Mukherjee, awarded the prestigious President's Standards to Armoured Corps Centre and School, during a grand Ceremonial Parade held at Ahmednagar on 15 April 2017.

=== List of the other Regiments of Indian Army Armoured Corps awarded with the President's Colours/Standards/Guidons ===
Sr no.	Regiment	Date and place	Awarded by	Info
1	2nd Lancers (Gardner's Horse)	November 1961	President Dr. Rajendra Prasad	Awarded with the 'Guidon'.
2	7th Light Cavalry	31 March 1971, at Babina	President V. V. Giri	Awarded with the 'Guidon'.
3	1st Horse (Skinner's Horse)	31 March 1971, at Babina	President V. V. Giri	Awarded with the 'Guidon'.
4	16th Light Cavalry	4 March 1976, at Pathankot, Punjab	President Fakhruddin Ali Ahmed	To mark its bicentenary the President of India presented the colours to this famous Regiment.
5	4th Horse (Hodson's Horse)	4 March 1976, at Pathankot, Punjab	President Fakhruddin Ali Ahmed	Awarded with the 'Guidon'.
6	8th Light Cavalry	10 November 1976, at Jodhpur	President Fakhruddin Ali Ahmed	Awarded with the 'Guidon'.
7	65th Armoured Regiment (India)	11 November 1976	President Fakhruddin Ali Ahmed	Awarded with the 'Guidon'.
8	61st Cavalry (India)	23 September 1977	Shri B.D. Jatti, Vice President of India	Awarded with the 'Guidon'.
9	66th Armoured Regiment (India)	6 November 1979	President Neelam Sanjiva Reddy	The Regiment became the youngest to be presented with the "Guidon".
10	18 Cavalry	26 March 1980	President Neelam Sanjiva Reddy	Awarded with the 'Guidon'.
11	62 Cavalry	31 March 1981, at Ambala	President Neelam Sanjiva Reddy	Awarded with the 'Guidon'.
12	45th Cavalry (India)	11 December 1981	President Neelam Sanjiva Reddy	Awarded with the 'Guidon'.
13	63rd Cavalry (India)	2 January 1982	President Neelam Sanjiva Reddy	Awarded with the 'Guidon'.
14	Central India Horse	8 January 1983	President Giani Zail Singh	Awarded with the 'Guidon'.
15	9th Deccan Horse	9 January 1984, at Nabha, Punjab	President Giani Zail Singh	Awarded with the 'Guidon'.
16	3rd Cavalry Regiment (India)	8 February 1989	President R Venkataraman	Awarded with the 'Guidon'.
17	64th Cavalry (India)	7 April 1991, at Jammu	President R Venkataraman	Awarded with the 'Guidon'.
18	71st Armoured Regiment (India)	16 December 1994, at Suratgarh	President Shankar Dayal Sharma	Awarded with the 'Standard'.
19	72nd Armoured Regiment (India)	16 December 1994, at Suratgarh	President Shankar Dayal Sharma	Awarded with the 'Standard'.
20	69th Armoured Regiment (India)	1 December 2003, at Hisar	President Dr. A P J Abdul Kalam	Awarded with the 'Standard'.
21	86th Armoured Regiment (India)	1 December 2003, at Mamun Cantonment near Pathankot	President Dr. A P J Abdul Kalam	Awarded with the 'Standard'.
(9)	66th Armoured Regiment (India)	6 December 2004	Chief of Army Staff, General N C Vij	COAS presented the "Standard" to the Regiment to commemorate the Regiment's 38 years of dedicated service to the nation and valour of the 1971 War, On behalf of the President Kalam.
22	68th Armoured Regiment (India)	16 May 2005, at Bhatinda, Punjab	President Dr. A P J Abdul Kalam	Also, released the First Day Cover of the Regiment.
23	81st Armoured Regiment (India)	16 May 2005, at Jodhpur, Rajasthan	President Dr. A P J Abdul Kalam	Presentation of the 'President's Standards' to 81 Armoured Regiment at Jodhpur on 16 May 2005 by the President of India Dr. Kalam
(11)	62 Cavalry	31 March 2006, at Dehra Dun, Uttarakhand	Chief of the Army Staff General J. J. Singh	Gen JJ Singh presented a new President's Standard to the 62nd Cavalry.
24	46th Armoured Regiment (India)	17 Oct 2008, at Hisar, Haryana	President Pratibha Patil	Awarded with the 'Standard'.
25	83 Armoured Regiment	19 October 2010, at Babina, UP	President Pratibha Patil	White Tiger Armored Division The President and the Supreme Commander of the Armed Forces, Smt. Pratibha Devisingh Patil presenting the colours to the 83, 12, 13, 15 and 19 Armoured Regiments, at Babina, in Uttar Pradesh on October 19, 2010
26	13th Armoured Regiment (India)	19 October 2010, at Babina, UP	President Pratibha Patil	White Tiger Armored Division The President and the Supreme Commander of the Armed Forces, Smt. Pratibha Devisingh Patil presenting the colours to the 83, 12, 13, 15 and 19 Armoured Regiments, at Babina, in Uttar Pradesh on October 19, 2010
27	12th Armoured Regiment	19 October 2010, at Babina, UP	President Pratibha Patil	White Tiger Armored Division The President and the Supreme Commander of the Armed Forces, Smt. Pratibha Devisingh Patil presenting the colours to the 83, 12, 13, 15 and 19 Armoured Regiments, at Babina, in Uttar Pradesh on October 19, 2010
28	15th Armoured Regiment	19 October 2010, at Babina, UP	President Pratibha Patil	White Tiger Armored Division The President and the Supreme Commander of the Armed Forces, Smt. Pratibha Devisingh Patil presenting the colours to the 83, 12, 13, 15 and 19 Armoured Regiments, at Babina, in Uttar Pradesh on October 19, 2010
29	19th Armoured Regiment (India)	19 October 2010, at Babina, UP	President Pratibha Patil	White Tiger Armored Division The President and the Supreme Commander of the Armed Forces, Smt. Pratibha Devisingh Patil presenting the colours to the 83, 12, 13, 15 and 19 Armoured Regiments, at Babina, in Uttar Pradesh on October 19, 2010
30	85th Armoured Regiment (India)	30 September 2011, at Roorkee	Chief of the Army Staff, General V. K. Singh	Awarded with the 'Standard', On behalf of the President of India, Mrs Pratibha Patil.
31	70 Armoured Regiment	28 November 2011, at Patiala	President Pratibha Patil	
32	73 Armoured Regiment	28 November 2011, at Patiala	President Pratibha Patil	Awarded with the 'Standard'.
33	74 Armoured Regiment	28 November 2011, at Patiala	President Pratibha Patil	Awarded with the 'Standard'.
34	5th Armoured Regiment	28 November 2011, at Patiala	President Pratibha Patil	Awarded with the 'Standard'.
35	6th Lancers (India)	28 November 2011, at Patiala	President Pratibha Patil	Awarded with the 'Standard'.
36	89th Armoured Regiment (India)	November 30, 2013, at Namkum, Ranchi	Chief of Army Staff, General Bikram Singh	The Chief of Army Staff, General Bikram Singh presenting the 'Standard' to 89th Armoured Regiment, on November 30, 2013
37	67th Armoured Regiment (India)	21 February 2014, at Bikaner Military Station	Chief of Army Staff, General Bikram Singh	Awarded with the 'Standard'.
38	50th Armoured Regiment (India)	5 November 2014, at Mamun Military Station	COAS General Dalbir Singh	Awarded with the 'Standard'.
39	84 Armoured Regiment	5 November 2014, at Mamun Military Station	COAS General Dalbir Singh	Awarded with the 'Standard'.
40	44 Armoured Regiment	25 Feb 2015, at Suratgarh Military Station	COAS General Dalbir Singh	The Chief of Army Staff, General Dalbir Singh presenting the President's Standards' to 44 Armoured Regiment, at Suratgarh Military Station, in Rajasthan on February 25, 2015
(10)	18 Cavalry	7 March 2016	COAS General Dalbir Singh	The Chief of Army Staff, General Dalbir Singh presenting the President's 'Standard' to 18 Cavalry, in Amritsar on March 7, 2016
41	43 Armoured Regiment	16 March 2016, at Jaisalmer Military Station	COAS General Dalbir Singh	The Chief of Army Staff, General Dalbir Singh presenting the President's 'Standard' to 43 Armored Regiment, at Jaisalmer Military Station, in Rajasthan on March 16, 2016
42	75 Armoured Regiment	16 March 2016, at Jaisalmer Military Station	COAS General Dalbir Singh	The Chief of Army Staff, General Dalbir Singh presenting the President's 'Standard' to 75 Armoured Regiment, at Jaisalmer Military Station, in Rajasthan on March 16, 2016
43	47th Armoured Regiment (India)	21 October 2017, at Sunjuwan Military Station, Jammu	COAS General Bipin Rawat	'President's Standard' to 47 Armoured Regiment by COAS Bipin Rawat on 21 October 2017 at Jammu
44	10th Armoured Regiment (India)	5 December 2017, at Suratgarh Military Station, Rajasthan	COAS General Bipin Rawat	The Chief of Army Staff, General Bipin Rawat presenting the Standard Presentation to the 10, 41 and 87 Armoured Regiments at Suratgarh Military Station, Rajasthan on 5 December 2017
45	41 Armoured Regiment	5 December 2017, at Suratgarh Military Station, Rajasthan	COAS General Bipin Rawat	The Chief of Army Staff, General Bipin Rawat presenting the Standard Presentation to the 10, 41 and 87 Armoured Regiments at Suratgarh Military Station, Rajasthan on 5 December 2017
46	87th Armoured Regiment (India)	5 December 2017, at Suratgarh Military Station, Rajasthan	COAS General Bipin Rawat	The Chief of Army Staff, General Bipin Rawat presenting the Standard Presentation to the 10, 41 and 87 Armoured Regiments at Suratgarh Military Station, Rajasthan on 5 December 2017

- Corps of the Indian Army
1. Army Medical Corps.
  - On 3 April 1966, Army Medical Corps were presented with the 'Colours' by the President Dr. S. Radhakrishnan.
2. Indian Army Corps of Signals.
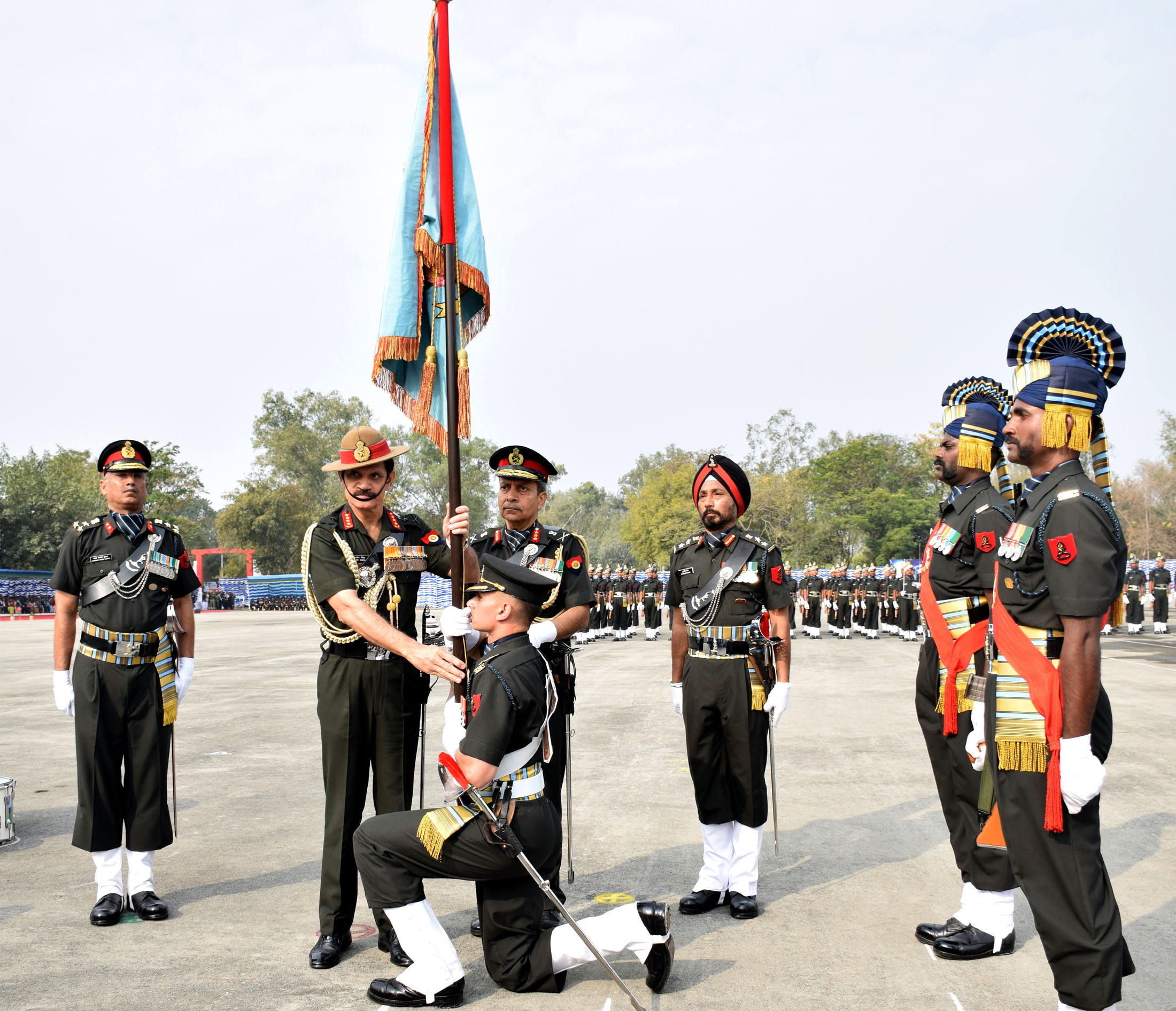
  The Chief of Army Staff, General Dalbir Singh presenting the "President's Colours" to the Indian Army Corps of Signals, at Jabalpur on February 15, 2016
  - On 15 February 2016, the President's Colour was awarded by the General Dalbir Singh, Chief of Army Staff, on behalf of the President to the Indian Army Corps of Signals, at Gauri Shankar Parade Ground, Jabalpur.
3. Corps of Army Air Defence.
  - On 28 September 2019, the President's Colour was awarded to the Corps of Army Air Defence by the President Ramnath Kovind, at Gopalpur, Ganjam district, Odisha.
4. Army Aviation Corps.
  - On 10 October 2019, the President's Colour was awarded by the President Ramnath Kovind to the Army Aviation Corps, at the Combat Army Aviation Training School, Nashik Road.
5. The Indian Army Corps of EME (Electronics and Mechanical Engineers)
  - The President of India, Dr S. Radhakrishnan, presented the 'Colours' to the Corps on 15 October 1964 at 1 EME Centre during the 21st Anniversary celebrations.
  - The Second Colours Presentation was presented at 3 EME Centre Bhopal on 15 October 1980. The Colours presented on behalf of the President by the General Om Prakash Malhotra, COAS.
  - The Third Colours presentation was presented on 23 November 2004. The old colours were put to rest and new colours were presented to the Corps at 1 EME Centre, Secunderabad by the General N C Vij, COAS on behalf of the President.
  - The 4th Colours Presentation was presented at 3 EME Centre Bhopal. The Corps was honoured with colours on 18 February 2005, by the COAS, General J. J. Singh, on behalf of the President of India.
6. Army Ordnance Corps.
  Flag of Indian Army Ordnance Corps
  - Army Ordnance Corps was awarded with the 'Colours' by the Vice President of India Shri Gopal Swarup Pathak on 8 December 1970, at AOC Centre Secunderabad.
7. Army Service Corps.
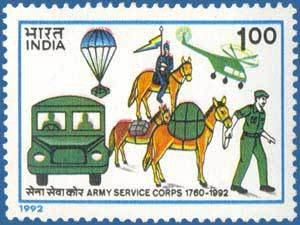
  Stamp of India – 1992 – Colnect 164330 – Army Service Corps – 1760 – 1992 – Commemoration
  - The new 'Colours' were presented by the President of India, Dr Zakir Husain to the Corps on 8 December 1967 on the 207th Corps Anniversary, at ASC Centre (South), Bangalore.
  - The Second Regimental Colours were presented on the occasion of the Third Reunion by General Om Prakash Malhotra, COAS on 8 December 1979.
8. Indian Army Pioneer Corps.
  - The Pioneer Corps is the operational logistics arm of the Indian Army. The Chief of Army Staff General J. J. Singh presented the 'colours' to the Pioneer Corps Regiment at Bangalore, on 24 November 2006.
9. Indian Army Corps of Engineers.
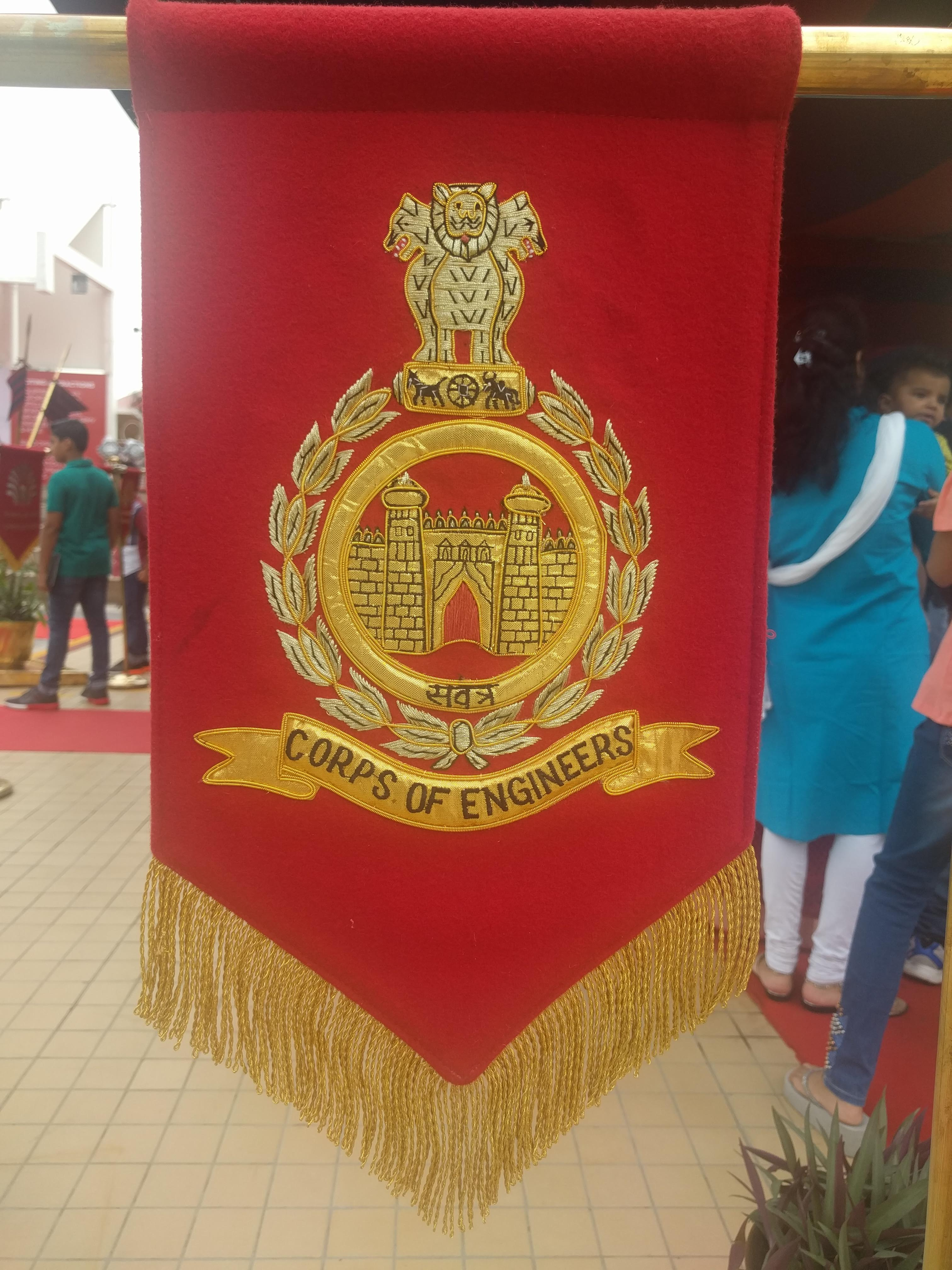
  Insignia of The Indian Army Corps of Engineers
  1. Bengal Engineer Group / Bengal Sappers.
    - On 12 January 1989, the 'President's Colour' was presented to the Bengal Engineer Group by the President R Venkataraman, at Roorkee.
  2. Bombay Engineer Group / Bombay Sappers.
    - On 21 February 1990, the Bombay Engineer Group was presented the "Colours" by his Excellency, the President of India Shri R Venkataraman.
  3. Madras Engineer Group / Madras Sappers.
    - On 20 March 1990, the Madras Engineer Group was presented the "Colours" by his Excellency, the President of India Shri R Venkataraman.
10. Indian Army Remount and Veterinary Corps.
  - The corps was awarded the Colours by the President of India on 21 December 1989, in recognition of its glorious contributions to Indian Army.
11. Army Education Corps (India).
  - On 24 February 1971, President V. V. Giri presented the colours to the Army Educational Corps, at Pachmarhi.
12. Corps of Military Police (India).
  - The President of India, Shri Neelam Sanjiva Reddy, presented 'Colours' to the Corps of Military Police on 24 April 1982.
- Training Establishments of the Indian Army
1. Indian Military Academy.
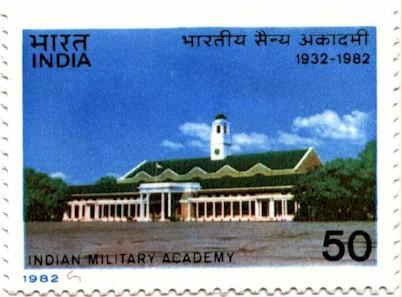
  IMA postage stamp
  - On 10 December 1962, on the 30th anniversary of the academy's inauguration, the second President of India, Dr. Sarvapalli Radhakrishnan, presented new colours to the Indian Military Academy.
  - On 15 Dec 1976, the fifth President of India, Shri Fakhruddin Ali Ahmed, presented new colours to IMA as a mark of appreciation of its services to the nation both in peace and war.
2. Officers Training Academy.
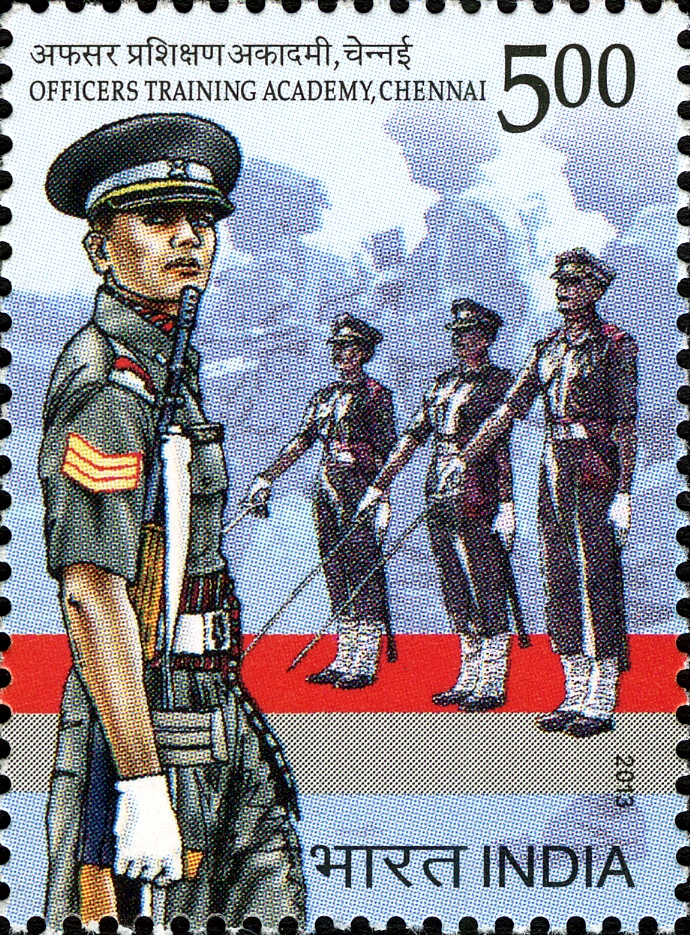
  Officers Training Academy 2013 postage stamp of India
  In August 1990, OTA was awarded at Chennai by the President Shri R. Venkataraman.

=== Indian Air Force ===
- Indian Air Force

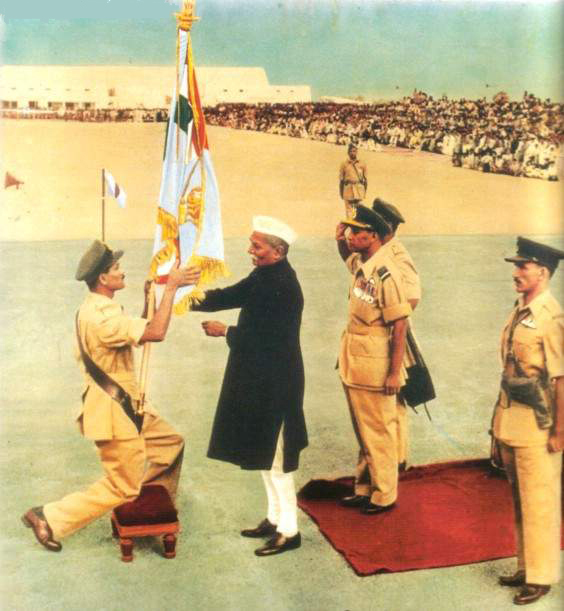
The President Dr. Rajendra Prasad presenting the President's Colour to the IAF

On 1 April 1954, the President's Colour was awarded to the IAF at Palam by the President Dr. Rajendra Prasad.

- Air HQ Communication Squadron, Indian Air Force (Pegasus). Air HQ Communication Squadron was awarded with the President's Colours on 11 Dec 1984, at Palam.
- Air Force Stations

List of President's Colour awarded to the Air Force Stations of the IAF

Sr no.	Air Force Stations	Date and place	Awarded by	Info
1	Hakimpet Air Force Station	4 March 2019	President Ramnath Kovind	

- Aircraft Squadrons of the IAF

List of President's Colour awarded to the Squadrons of the IAF

Sr no.	Squadron	Date and place	Awarded by	Info
1	No. 1 Squadron	18 Oct 1968	President Zakir Hussain	
2	No. 12 Squadron	15 Mar 1971 at AFS Agra	President V. V. Giri	Transport Squadron
3	No. 3 Squadron	18 Mar 1975		
4	No. 5 Squadron	9 Apr 1975		
5	No. 106 Squadron	9 Apr 1975		
6	No. 101 Squadron	19 Nov 1975		
7	No. 16 Squadron	13 Nov 1976		
8	No. 23 Squadron	13 Nov 1976		
9	No. 2 Squadron	15 Dec 1979		
10	No. 4 Squadron	15 Dec 1979		
11	No. 6 Squadron	20 Dec 1980		
12	No. 7 Squadron	20 Dec 1980		
13	No. 8 Squadron	5 Mar 1984 at Tezpur	President Giani Zail Singh	MiG-21 Squadron at the time (Eight Pursoots)
14	No. 9 Squadron	11 Dec 1984, at Palam		
15	No. 10 Squadron	18 Mar 1985 at Jodhpur		
16	No. 11 Squadron	18 Mar 1985 at Jodhpur		
17	No. 17 Squadron	8 Nov 1988 at Palam		
18	No. 28 Squadron	2 Apr 1991 at Pune		
19	No. 20 Squadron	10 Mar 1992 at Kalaikunda		
20	No. 43 Squadron	10 Mar 1992 at Kalaikunda		
21	No. 14 Squadron	11 Nov 1994 at Ambala		
22	No. 15 Squadron	26 Oct 1995 at Jodhpur	President Shankar Dayal Sharma	
23	No. 27 Squadron	13 Nov 1996 at Gorakhpur		
24	No. 29 Squadron	7 Nov 1997 at Palam		
25	No. 41 Squadron	7 Nov 1997 at Palam		
26	No. 35 Squadron	24 Oct 2000 at Bareilly		
27	No. 37 Squadron	15 Feb 2007		
28	No. 48 Squadron	15 Feb 2007		
29	No. 59 Squadron	12 Nov 2008		
30	No. 108 Squadron	25 Mar 2009	President Smt Pratibha Patil	The President, Smt. Pratibha Devisingh Patil presenting the Standard to 108 Squadron, during the Presidential Standard Ceremony, at Gorakhpur, Uttar Pradesh on 25 March 2009
31	No. 47 Squadron	10 Nov 2009		
32	No. 49 Squadron	9 Mar 2010	President Smt Pratibha Patil	The President and Supreme Commander of the Armed Forces, Smt. Pratibha Devisingh Patil conferred the President's Standard Indian Air Force-49 Squadron, at Jodhpur on 9 March 2010.
33	No. 31 Squadron	8 Jan 2011		
34	No. 44 Squadron	9 Mar 2011		
35	No. 24 Squadron	6 Mar 2012		
36	No. 33 Squadron	18 Dec 2012		
37	No. 25 Squadron	18 Dec 2012		
38	No. 220 Squadron	20 Nov 2013		
39	No. 32 Squadron	20 Nov 2013 at Halwara	President Shri Pranab Mukherjee	The President, Shri Pranab Mukherjee presenting the Standard to the No. 32 Squadron of Indian Air Force, at Halwara, Punjab on November 20, 2013
40	No. 26 Squadron	21 Nov 2014		
41	No. 21 Squadron	4 Mar 2015		
42	No. 18 Squadron	28 Nov 2015		
43	No. 22 Squadron	28 Nov 2015		Info
44	No. 30 Squadron	10 November 2016	President Pranab Mukherjee	Info
45	No. 223 Squadron	16 November 2017 at Adampur	President Ramnath Kovind	The President and Supreme Commander of the Indian Armed Forces, Shri Ram Nath Kovind presenting the Standard to 223 Squadron of Indian Air Force, at Adampur, in Punjab
46	No. 51 Squadron	22 March 2018, at AFS Halwara	President Ramnath Kovind	The President and Supreme Commander of the Indian Armed Forces, Shri Ram Nath Kovind awarding the President's Standard to 51 Squadron of the Indian Air Force, at Air Force Station Halwara, in Punjab
47	No. 45 Squadron	8 March 2024, at AFS Hindon	President Draupadi Murmu	
48	No. 221 Squadron	8 March 2024, at AFS Hindon	President Draupadi Murmu	

- Helicopter Units of the IAF

List of President's Colour awarded to the Helicopter Units of the IAF

Sr no.	Helicopter squadron	Date and place	Awarded by	Info
1	No. 104 Helicopter Unit	8 Nov 1988 at Chandigarh		
2	No. 109 Helicopter Unit	2 Apr 1991 at Pune		
3	No. 114 Helicopter Unit	13 Nov 1996 at Gorakhpur		
4	No. 105 Helicopter Unit	25 Mar 2009		
5	No. 107 Helicopter Unit	9 Mar 2010	President Smt Pratibha Patil	The President and Supreme Commander of the Armed Forces, Smt. Pratibha Devisingh Patil conferred the Presidents Standard Indian Air Force-107 Helicopter Unit, at Jodhpur on 9 March 2010.
6	No. 110 Helicopter Unit	9 Mar 2011		
7	No. 111 Helicopter Unit	6 Mar 2012		
8	No. 112 Helicopter Unit	11 Mar 2014		
9	No. 115 Helicopter Unit	21 Nov 2014		
10	No. 116 Helicopter Unit	4 Mar 2015		
11	No. 119 Helicopter Unit	6 March 2016, at AFS Jamnagar	President Pranab Mukherjee	
12	No. 125 Helicopter Unit	4 March 2017, at AFS Tambaram	President Pranab Mukherjee	The President Pranab Mukherjee presenting the prestigious President's Standard to the No. 125 Helicopter Squadron, at Air Force Station Tambaram, Tamil Nadu
13	No. 117 Helicopter Unit	16 November 2017 at Adampur	President Ramnath Kovind	The President and Supreme Commander of the Indian Armed Forces, Shri Ram Nath Kovind presenting the Standard to 117 Helicopter Unit of Indian Air Force, at Adampur, in Punjab Info
14	No. 118 Helicopter Unit	29 November 2018, at AFS Guwahati	President of India, Shri Ram Nath Kovind	

- Signal Units of IAF.
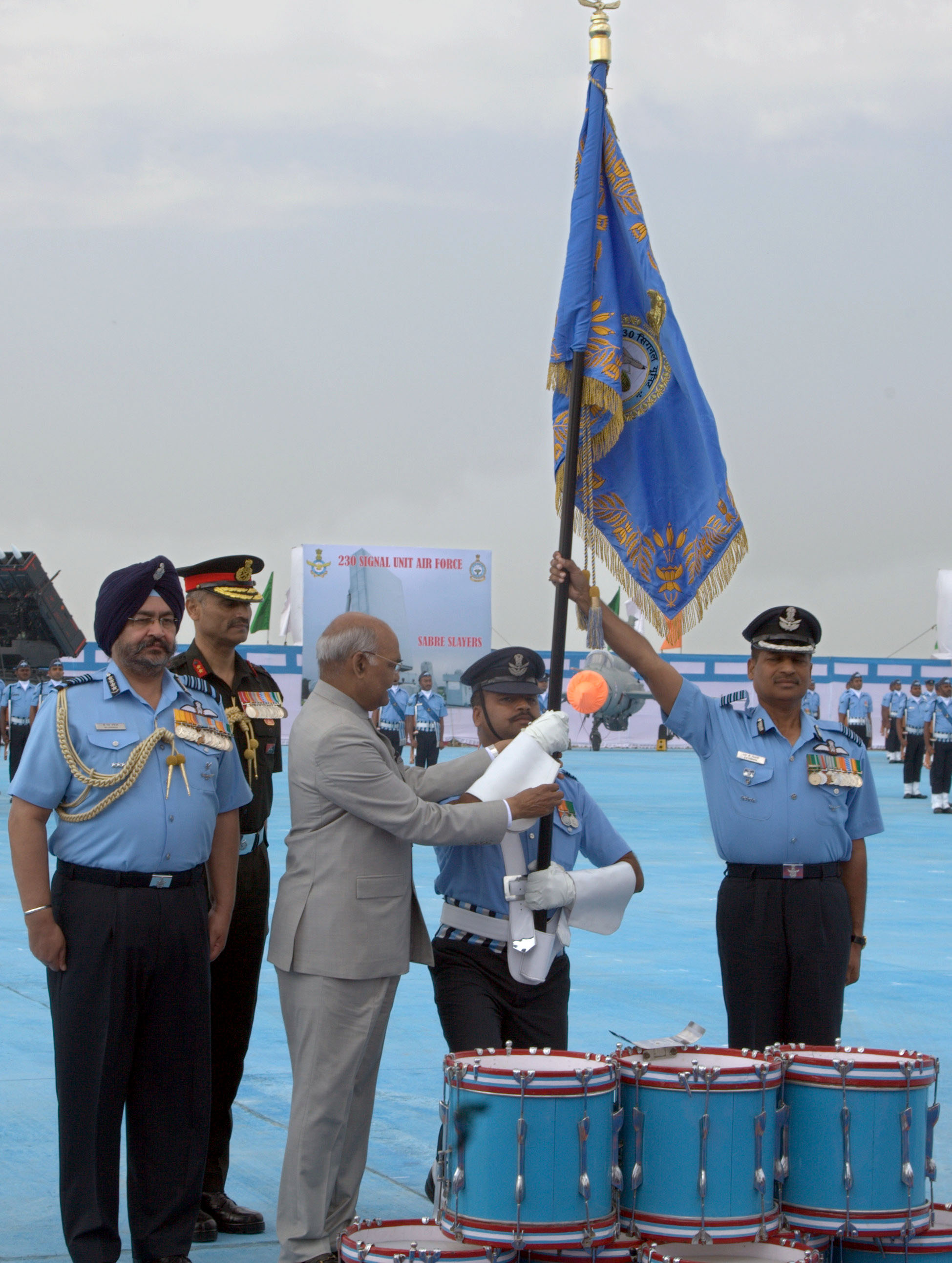
  The President Ramnath Kovind presenting the President's Colour to the No. 230 Signal Unit of the IAF

List of President's Colour awarded to the Signal Units of the IAF

Sr no.	Unit	Date and place	Awarded by	Info
1	No. 230 Signal Unit	22 March 2018 at AFS Halwara	President Ramnath Kovind	Info
2	No. 501 Signal Unit	10 November 2016 at AFS Barnala	President Pranab Mukherjee	
3	No. 509 Signal Unit	8 March 2024 at AFS Hindon	President Draupadi Murmu	

- Base Repair Depot (BRD) of the IAF.
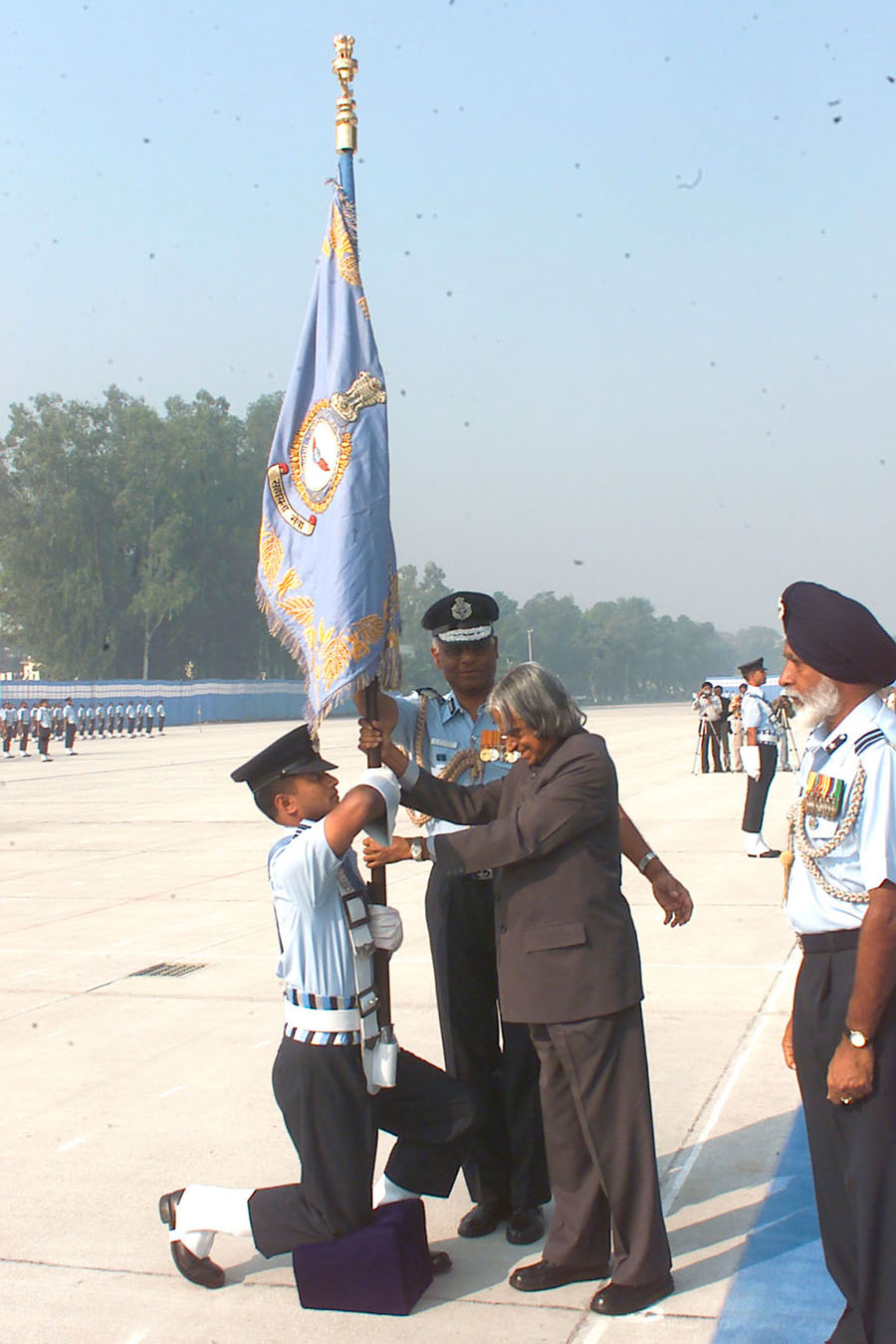
  The President Dr. A.P.J. Abdul Kalam presenting the President's Colours to the No. 1 Base Repair Depot

List of President's Colour awarded to the Base Repair Depots of the IAF

Sr no.	Base Repair Depot	Date and place	Awarded by	Info
1	No. 1 BRD	1 Nov 2004 at AFS Kanpur	President A. P. J. Abdul Kalam	Info
2	No. 9 BRD	8 Jan 2011	President Smt Pratibha Patil	Info
3	No. 3 BRD	15 Mar 2013	President Smt Pratibha Patil	Info
4	No. 4 BRD	11 Mar 2014	President Pranab Mukherjee	Info
5	No. 5 BRD	4 March 2019 at AFS Hakimpet	President Ramnath Kovind	Info
6	No. 11 BRD	8 March 2024 at AFS Hindon	President Draupadi Murmu	

- Equipment Depot (ED).
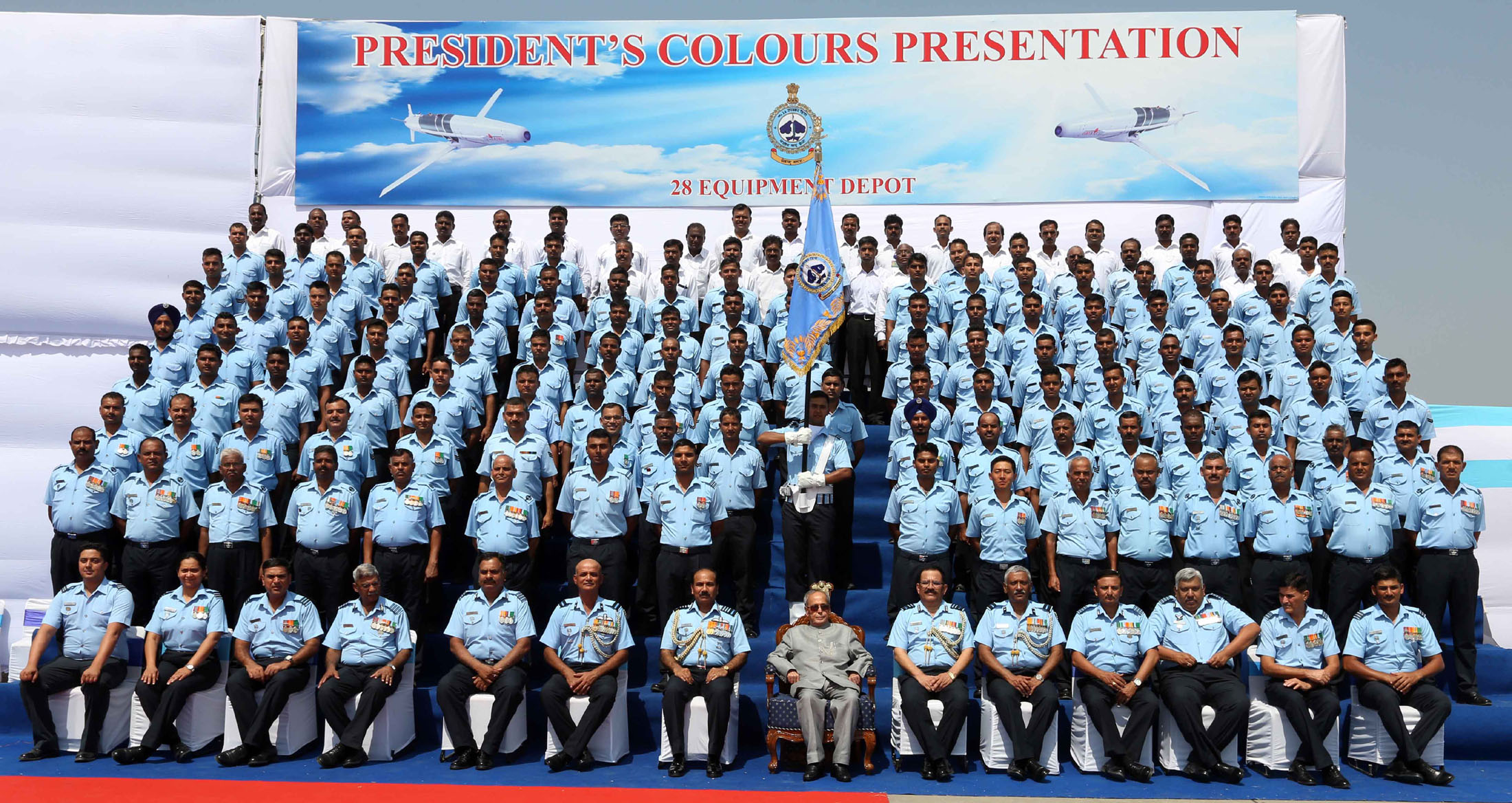
  The President, Shri Pranab Mukherjee presented the Colours to the No. 28 Equipment Depot, at Air Force Station, Jamnagar, in Gujarat.

List of President's Colour awarded to the Equipment Depots of the IAF

Sr no.	Equipment Depot	Date and place	Awarded by	Info
1	28 Equipment Depot	6 March 2016, at AFS Jamnagar	President Pranab Mukherjee	Info

- Institutions of the IAF

List of President's Colour awarded to the Institutions of the IAF

Sr no.	Institutions	Date and place	Awarded by	Info
1	Air Force Academy	10 Sep 1975 at Hyderabad		Info
2	Paratroopers Training School	11 Nov 1994 at Ambala		Info
3	Flying Instructors School	26 Oct 1995 at Jodhpur	President Shankar Dayal Sharma	Info
4	Air Force Administrative College (AFAC)	24 Oct 2000 at Bareilly		Info
5	Aircrew Examining Board (AEB)	1 Nov 2004 at Kanpur	President A. P. J. Abdul Kalam	Info
6	Aircraft & Systems Testing Establishment (ASTE)	21 Nov 2005 at Bangalore		Info
7	Institute of Aerospace Medicine (IAM)	21 Nov 2005, at Bangalore		Info
8	Air Force Technical College (AFTC)	12 Nov 2008	President Smt Pratibha Patil	The President, Smt. Pratibha Devisingh Patil presenting the Colours to Air Force Technical College (AFTC) at a ceremony, organized at AFTC, Jalahalli, in Bangalore on 12 November 2008
9	Tactics and Air Combat Development Establishment (TACDE)	10 Nov 2009 at Gwalior	President Smt Pratibha Patil	Info The President, Smt. Pratibha Devisingh Patil presenting the award of standard to TACDE AF on the occasion of Standard presentation ceremony to IAF, at Gwalior on 10 November 2009
10	Air Force Central Medical Establishment (AFCME)	15 Mar 2013		Info
11	Mechanical Training Institute (MTI)	4 March 2017, at AFS Tambaram	President Pranab Mukherjee	The President Pranab Mukherjee presenting the 'Colours' to the Mechanical Training Institute (MTI)
12	Air Defence College	29 November 2018, at AFS Guwahati	President Shri Ramnath Kovind	

=== Indian Navy ===
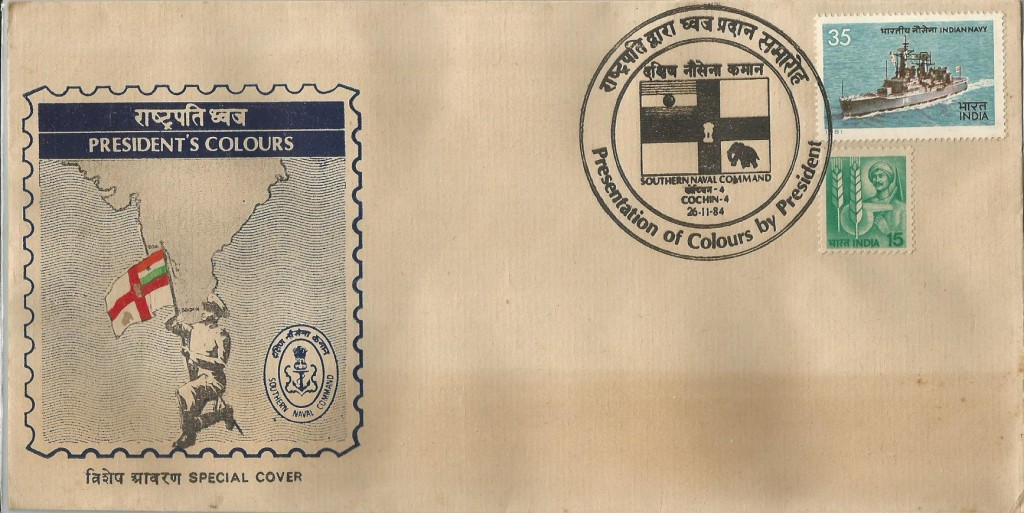
A postcard depicting presentation of Naval Colours by the President

- Indian Navy

The Indian Navy was the first branch of the Armed Forces which was rewarded with the President's Colours on 27 May 1951, by the President Dr. Rajendra Prasad. Since then every service command and ground installation of the Navy has been awarded the President's Colour of the Navy.

1. Naval Commands and Fleets
  1. Southern Naval Command was awarded on 26 November 1984 by the President Giani Zail Singh.
  2. Eastern Naval Command was awarded on 25 March 1987 by the President Giani Zail Singh.
  3. Western Naval Command was awarded on 22 February 1990 by the President Ramaswamy Venkataraman.
  4. Western Fleet was awarded on 9 March 1997 by the President Dr. Shankar Dayal Sharma.
  5. Eastern Fleet
2. Submarine Arm.
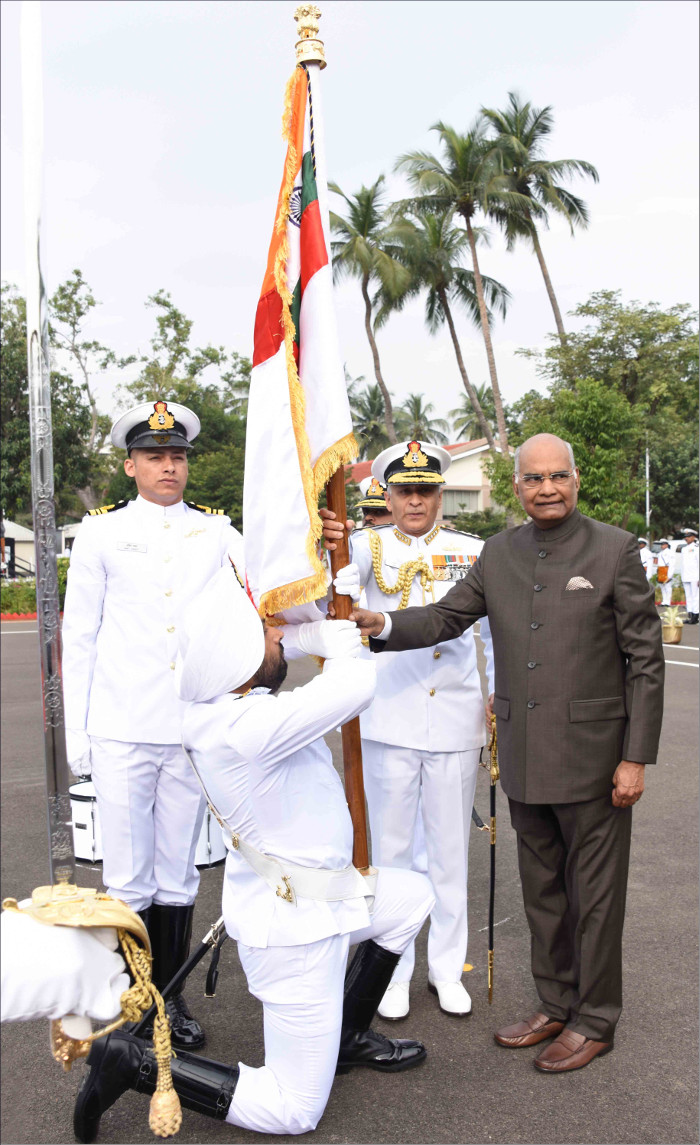
  The President Ramnath Kovind awarding the President's Colour to the Submarine Arm of the Indian Navy
  On 8 December 2017, the Submarine Arm of the Indian Navy was awarded by the President Ramnath Kovind.
3. Indian Naval Academy (INA), Ezhimala.
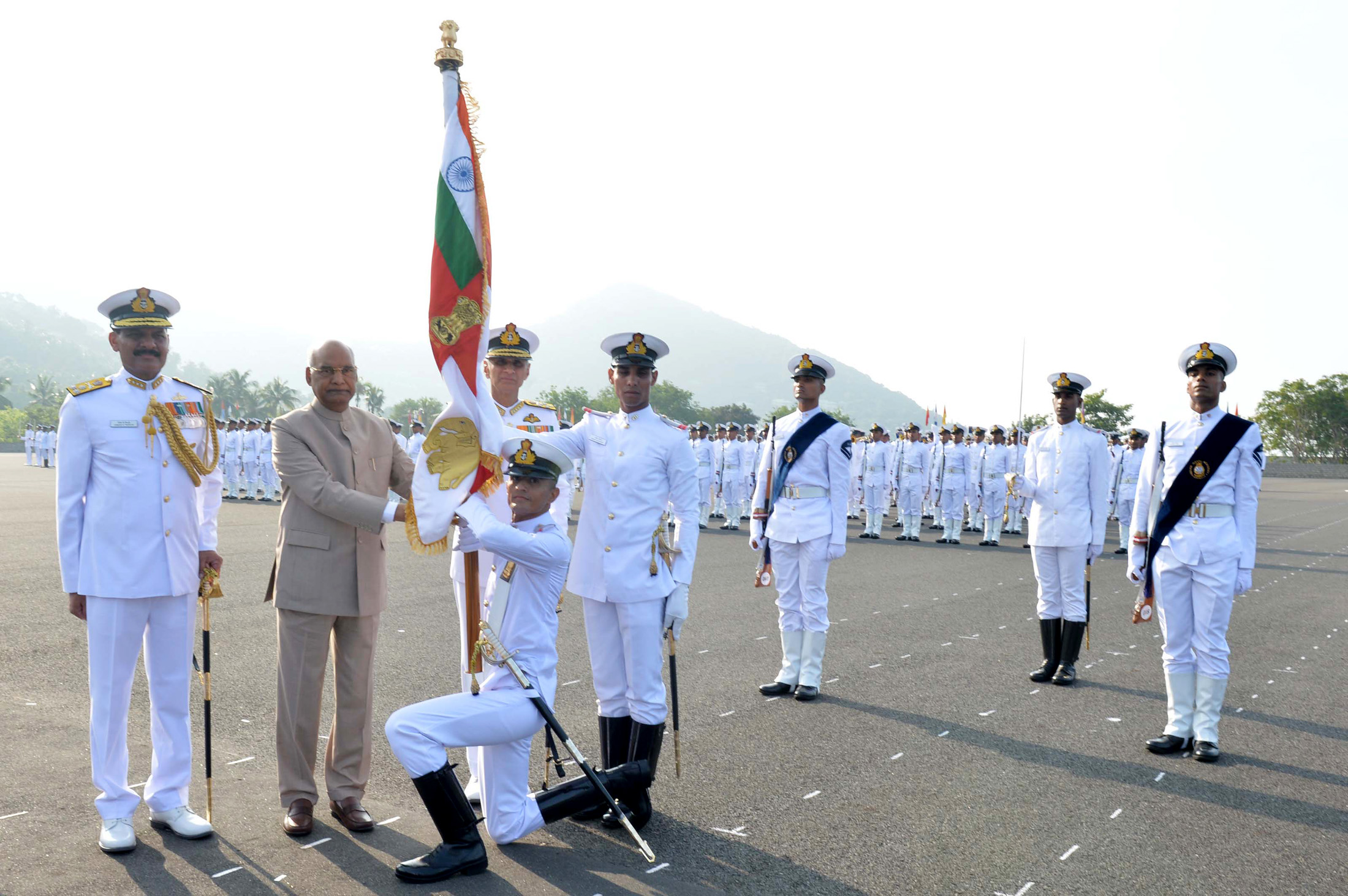
  The President, Shri Ramnath Kovind presenting the 'President's Colour' to the Indian Naval Academy, at Ezhimala, Kerala on November 20, 2019
  Indian Naval Academy (INA), Ezhimala was awarded on 20 November 2019 by the President Ramnath Kovind.
4. Indian Naval Stations
  1. INS Shivaji.
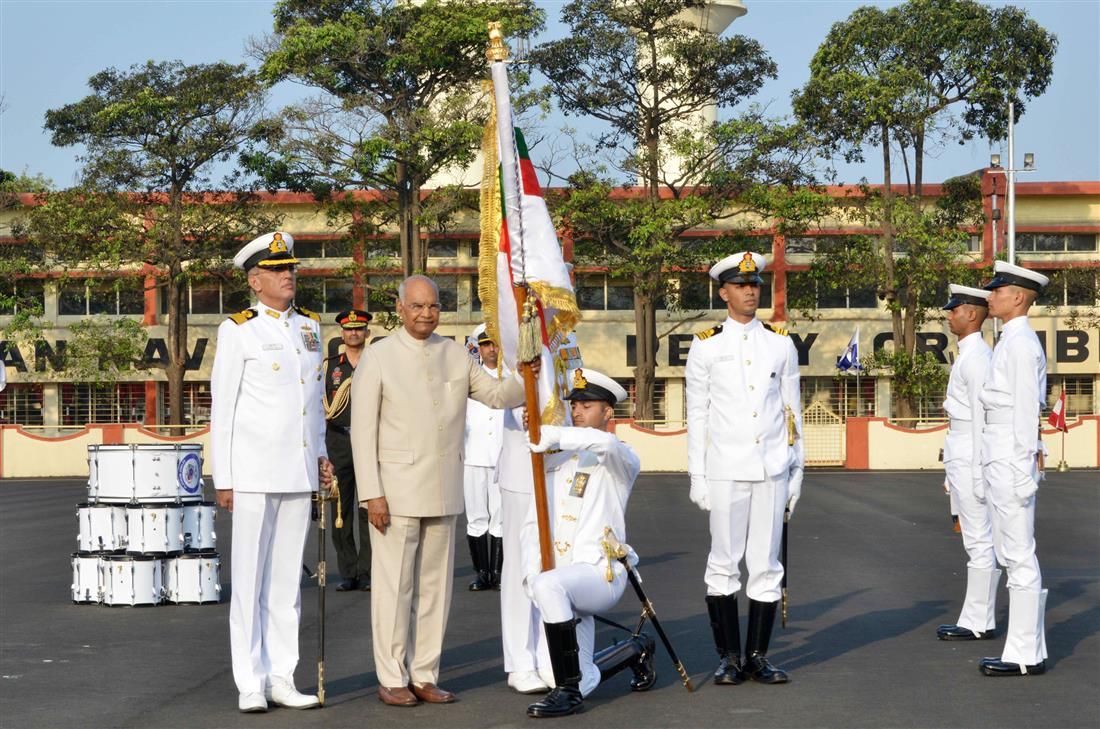
    The President, Shri Ramnath Kovind presenting the President's Colour to the INS Shivaji, in Lonavala, Maharashtra on February 13, 2020
    INS Shivaji, Lonavala was awarded on 13 February 2020 by the President Ramnath Kovind.
  2. INS Valsura
    - INS Valsura, Jamnagar awarded with prestigious colours on 25 March 2022 by the President Shri Ramnath Kovind.
5. Indian Naval Air Arm
  - President Shri Ramnath Kovind awarded the President's Colour to the Indian Naval Air Arm at the INS Hansa base near Panaji in Goa on 6 September 2021.
6. Naval combatant squadrons of the Navy
  1. 22nd Missile Vessel Squadron
    - President of India Shri Ramnath Kovind presented the President's Standard to the 22nd Missile Vessel Squadron, aka the Killers Squadron, at Naval Dockyard, Mumbai on 8 December 2021, the first naval combatant squadron to be presented with a standard in the Navy.
