= List of Indian Air Force stations =

The Indian Air Force (IAF) currently operates seven Air Commands. Each command is headed by an Air Officer Commanding-in-Chief of the rank of Air Marshal.

The IAF currently has over 60 air stations all over India. These are grouped into seven commands: Western Air Command at New Delhi, Delhi; Eastern Air Command at Shillong, Meghalaya; Central Air Command at Prayagraj, Uttar Pradesh; Southern Air Command at Thiruvananthapuram, Kerala; South Western Air Command at Gandhinagar, Gujarat; Training Command at Bengaluru, Karnataka, and Maintenance Command at Nagpur, Maharashtra. The largest transport airbase is in Hindon, Uttar Pradesh.

Gwalior hosts the IAF's elite Tactics and Air Combat Development Establishment (TACDE), a premier unit for advanced fighter pilot training in aerial tactics, a counterpart to the US Navy's TOPGUN, focusing on operational doctrines and tactics for aircraft. It is also a specialized Ground attack and Air Superiority base.

There are a number of new air stations being built across India, in line with India's strategic doctrine. The Indian Navy has some separate air stations for its aviation wing.

Western Air Command is the largest air command. It operates 16 airforce stations in Jammu & Kashmir, Punjab, Haryana, Himachal Pradesh and Uttar Pradesh. Eastern Air Command operates 15 airforce stations in eastern and north-eastern India. Central Air Command operates two airforce stations in Uttar Pradesh, Madhya Pradesh and surrounding states of central India. Southern Air Command's tasks include protecting vital shipping routes. It operates nine air stations in Southern India and two in the Andaman and Nicobar Islands. South Western Air Command is the front line of defence against Pakistan. This important command operates 12 air stations in Gujarat, Maharashtra and Rajasthan.

== List of air stations ==
Map of this section's coordinates

Note: Station and unit details are from Scramble.nl (2009) and outdated. Article needs to be revised/updated.

Station	ICAO	Runway	Elevation	Geographical coordinates	State/territory	Wing	Squadrons	Aircraft
Western Air Command								
Adampur AFS	VIAX	13/31	775 ft / 236 m	31.434879°N 75.757256°E	Punjab	8th Wing	No. 47 Squadron No. 223 Squadron IAF	Mikoyan MiG-29
Ambala AFS	VIAM	12L/30R; 12R/30L	900 ft / 274 m	30°22′14″N 76°49′4″E	Haryana	7 Wing	No. 5 Squadron No. 14 Squadron No. 17 Squadron 14 Sqn Missile and UAV Squadron 2209 & Squadron 2251S	SEPECAT Jaguar Dassault Rafale
Amritsar AFS	VIAR	16/34	755 ft / 230 m	31°42′28″N 74°47′57″E	Punjab	1 FBSU	-	-
Awantipur AFS	VIAW	12/30	5,400 ft / 1,646 m	33°52′35.86″N 74°58′32.45″E	Jammu & Kashmir	8 FBSU	-	-
Bathinda AFS	VIBT	13/31	700 ft /213 m	30.268848°N 74.757430°E	Punjab	34 Wing	No. 17 Squadron	Dassault Rafale
Chandigarh AFS	VICG	11/29	1,012 ft / 308 m	30.676290°N 76.788535°E	Chandigarh	12 Wing/3 BRD	No. 44 Squadron No. 48 Squadrons No. 126 Helicopter Flight	Transport: Antonov An-32 Ilyushin Il-76 Helicopters: Mil Mi-26 Boeing CH-47 Chinook
Gurugram AFS	Logistics base			28.437098°N 77.028544°E	Haryana	IFC and IMAC.	-	-
Faridabad AFS	Logistics base			28.371888°N 77.276432°E	Haryana	54 ASP, 56th Air Storage Park, Guard dog training.	-	-
Halwara AFS	VIHX	13/31	790 ft / 241 m	30.748041°N 75.633209°E	Punjab	9 Wing	No. 220 Squadron IAF No. 221 Squadron IAF	Sukhoi Su-30MKI
Hindon AFS	VIDX	09/27	700 ft / 213 m	28.707647°N 77.359340°E	Uttar Pradesh	28 Wing	No. 77 Squadron No. 131 Helicopter Flight No. 181 Flight No. 129 Helicopter Unit No. 81 Squadron IAF	Transport: C130J Super Hurcules Hawker Siddeley HS 748 Boeing 737-200 Helicopters: HAL Cheetah Mil Mi-17 Boeing C-17 Globemaster III
Vadsar AFS	AFS	-	-	23.146200°N 72.481270°E	Gujarat	47 Signal Unit	-	-
Jammu AFS	VIJU	18/36	1029 ft / 314 m	32.689167°N 74.8375°E	Jammu & Kashmir	23 Wing	No. 153 Helicopter Unit No. 154 Helicopter Unit No. 132 Helicopter Flight No. 223 Squadron IAF	Helicopters: Mil Mi-17 HAL Cheetah Combat Jets: Mikoyan MiG-29
Leh AFS	VILH	06/24; 07R/25L; 07L/25R	10,682 ft/ 3,256 m	34.137216°N 77.546614°E	Ladakh	21 Wing	No. 114 Helicopter Unit No. 130 Helicopter Unit	Mil Mi-17 HAL Cheetah
Mudh-Nyoma AFS		12/30	13,700 ft/ 4,200 m	33.1691°N 78.7297°E	Ladakh			
Palam AFS	VIDP	09/27; 10/28	776 ft / 237 m	28.573736°N 77.114610°E	Delhi	3 Wing	No. 41 Squadron Air HQ Communication Squadron, Indian Air Force	Hawker Siddeley HS 748 Dornier 228 777-300ER Boeing 737 BBJ Embraer 145 Embraer 135 Mil Mi-17
Pathankot AFS	VIPK	01/19	1,017 ft / 310 m	32.236929°N 75.633227°E	Punjab	18 Wing	No. 125 Helicopter Squadron No. 137 Helicopter Squadron	Helicopters: AH-64 Apache (operated by both the squadrons)
Sarsawa AFS	VISP	09/27	891 ft / 272 m	29.993718°N 77.430671°E	Uttar Pradesh	30 Wing	No. 117 Helicopter Unit No. 152 Helicopter Unit	Mil Mi-17 HAL Dhruv
Sirsa AFS	VISX	05/23	650 ft / 198 m	29°33′46″N 75°00′19″E	Haryana	45 Wing		
Srinagar AFS	VISR	13/31	5,458 ft / 1,664 m	33.994374°N 74.765299°E	Jammu & Kashmir	1 Wing	No. 223 Squadron No. 154 Helicopter Unit, IAF	Mikoyan MiG-29 Mil Mi-17
Udhampur AFS	VIUX	18/36	1,950 ft / 594 m	32.911503°N 75.154410°E	Jammu & Kashmir	HQ AOC J&K 39 Wing	No. 132 Helicopter Flight	HAL Cheetah
Eastern Air Command								
Purnea AFS	VEPU	18/36	412 ft / 125 m	25.759722°N 87.41°E	Bihar	14 FBSU	-	-
Bagdogra AFS	VEBD	18/36	412 ft / 125 m	26°40′52″N 88°19′43″E	West Bengal	20 Wing	No. 156 Helicopter Unit	Mil Mi-17
Barapani AFS	VEBI	04/22	2910 ft / 886 m	25°42′13″N 091°58′43″E	Meghalaya			
Barrackpore AFS	VEBR	02/20	18 ft / 5 m	22°46′55″N 88°21′33″E	West Bengal	6 Wing	No. 157 Helicopter Unit	Mil Mi-17
Chabua AFS	VECA	05/23	350 ft / 107 m	27°27′44″N 95°07′05″E	Assam	14 Wing	No. 102 Squadron	Sukhoi Su-30MKI
Hasimara AFS	VEHX	11L/29R; 11R/29L	340 ft /104 m	26°41′53″N 89°22′08″E	West Bengal	16 Wing	No. 101 Squadron IAF	Dassault Rafale
Jorhat AFS	VEJT	04/22	284 ft / 87 m	26°43′54″N 94°10′32″E	Assam	10 Wing	No. 43 Squadron No. 49 Squadron	Antonov An-32
Kalaikunda AFS	VEDX	17/35	200 ft / 60 m	22°20′21.90″N 87°12′52.37″E	West Bengal	5 Wing	18 Squadron, OCU	MiG-27, MiG-21
Kumbhigram AFS	VEKU	06/24	352 ft / 107 m	24°54′47″N 92°58′43″E	Assam	22 Wing	No. 110 Helicopter Unit	Mil Mi-8
Mohanbari AFS	VEMN	05/23	361 ft / 110 m	27°28′50″N 95°01′18″E	Assam	42 Wing	No. 127 Helicopter Unit No. 128 Helicopter Unit	Mil Mi-17
Mountain Shadow AFS	VEGT	05/23	350 ft / 107 m	26°06′22″N 91°35′09″E	Assam			
Panagarh AFS	VEPH	15/33	240 ft / 73 m	23°28′28″N 87°25′39″E	West Bengal	62 SU, 87 Squadron	No. 87 Squadron	C-130J Super Hercules
Salua AFS				22°16′22″N 87°17′22″E	West Bengal	Radar station		
Tawang AFS	VETW		8,756 ft / 2,669 m	27°35′19″N 91°52′40″E	Arunachal Pradesh			
Tezpur AFS	VETZ	04/22	240 ft / 73 m	26°42′44″N 92°47′14″E	Assam	11 Wing	No. 2 Squadron No. 106 Squadron	Sukhoi Su-30MKI
Central Air Command								
Agra AFS	VIAG	05/23; 12/30	551 ft 167 m	27°09′27″N 77°57′39″E	Uttar Pradesh	4 Wing	No. 12 Squadron No. 78 Squadron No. 50 Squadron	Transport: Antonov An-32 Ilyushin Il-78 AEW&C: Beriev A-50
Bakshi Ka Talab AFS	VIBL	09/27	385 ft/ 117 m	26°59′19″N 80°53′29″E	Uttar Pradesh	AD Flight		
Bamrauli AFS	VEAB	06/24; 12/30	322 ft/ 98 m	25°26′24″N 81°44′02″E	Uttar Pradesh	29 Wing		
Bareilly AFS	VIBY	11/29	565 ft/ 172 m	28°25′21″N 79°26′49″E	Uttar Pradesh	15 Wing	No. 111 Helicopter Unit No. 24 Squadron No. 8 Squadron	Helicopters: HAL Dhruv Combat Jets: Sukhoi Su-30MKI
Bihta AFS		07/25	52 ft 170 m	25°35′27″N 84°53′00″E	Bihar			
Chakeri AFS	VICX	01/19; 09/27	410 ft/124 m	26°24′10″N 80°24′44″E	Uttar Pradesh			
Darbhanga AFS	VEDH	14/28	21 ft / 38 m	26°11′41″N 85°55′03″E	Bihar			
Gorakhpur AFS	VEGK	11/29	259 ft / 78 m	26°44′22″N 83°26′58″E	Uttar Pradesh	17 Wing	No. 16 Squadron No. 27 Squadron No. 105 Helicopter Unit	Combat Jets: SEPECAT Jaguar Helicopters: Mil Mi-17
Gwalior AFS	VIGR	06/24	617 ft / 188 m	26°17′36″N 78°13′40″E	Madhya Pradesh	40 Wing	No. 1 Squadron; No. 7 Squadron; No. 9 Squadron	Elite Training School: TACDE Fighter Jets: Dassault Mirage 2000
Southern Air Command								
Car Nicobar AFS	VOCX	02/20	42 ft / 13 m	09°09′09″N 092°49′11″E	Andaman & Nicobar Islands	37 Wing		
Sulur AFS	VOSX	05/23	1,250 ft / 381 m	11°00′49″N 077°09′35″E	Tamil Nadu	43 Wing 5 BRD 24 TETTRA School 6 AFH	109 HU No. 33 Squadron No. 45 Squadron	Transport: Antonov An-32 Helicopters: Mil Mi-17 Combat Jets: HAL Tejas
Port Blair AFS	VOPB	04/22	16 m /5 m	11°38′28″N 92°43′47″E	Andaman & Nicobar Islands			
Tambaram AFS	VOTX	05/23; 12/30	90 ft / 27 m	12°54′25″N 80°07′16″E	Tamil Nadu			
Thanjavur AFS	VOTJ	07/25	253 ft / 77 m	10°43′20″N 079°06′05″E	Tamil Nadu	47 Wing	No. 222 Squadron	Sukhoi Su-30MKI
South Western Air Command								
Suratgarh AFS	VISG	05/23	560 ft / 170 m	29°23′16″N 073°54′14″E	Rajasthan	35 Wing	No. 104 Helicopter Squadron	Helicopters: Mil Mi-35
Bhuj AFS	VABJ	05/23	268 ft / 82 m	23°17′16″N 69°40′12″E	Gujarat	27 Wing		
Deesa AFS	VADS	06/24	485 ft / 148 m	24°16′05″N 72°12′16″E	Gujarat	52 Wing		
Jaisalmer AFS	VIJR	04/22	887 ft / 270 m	26°53′21″N 70°51′52″E	Rajasthan	41 Wing		
Jamnagar AFS	VAJM	06/24; 12/30	69 ft / 21 m	22°27′59″N 70°00′41″E	Gujarat	33 Wing	No. 6 Squadron No. 28 Squadron	
Jodhpur AFS	VIJO	05/23	717 ft / 219 m	26°15′05″N 73°02′53″E	Rajasthan	32 Wing	No. 31 Squadron No. 107 Helicopter Unit No. 116 Helicopter Unit No. 143 Helicopter Unit	Combat Jets : Sukhoi 30Mki Helicopters: Mil Mi-17 HAL Rudra HAL Chetak HAL Prachand
Lohegaon AFS	VAPO	10/28; 14/32	1,942 ft / 592 m	18°34′55″N 73°55′10″E	Maharashtra	2 Wing	No. 20 Squadron No. 30 Squadron	
Nal-Bikaner AFS	VIBK	05/23	750 ft / 229 m	28°04′21″N 73°12′24″E	Rajasthan	46 Wing	No. 3 Squadron No. 23 Squadron	Mikoyan-Gurevich MiG-21
Naliya AFS	VANY	06/24	68 ft / 21 m	23°13′12″N 68°54′00″E	Gujarat	49 Wing	No. 18 Squadron	HAL Tejas
Phalodi AFS		05/23	700 ft / 213 m	27°06′46″N 72°23′20″E	Rajasthan	35 Wing	No. 23 Squadron 104 Helicopter Squadron	
Uttarlai AFS	VIUT	02/20	500 ft / 152 m	25°48′46″N 71°28′56″E	Rajasthan	5 FBSU	No. 4 Squadron	
Makarpura AFS	VABO	04/22	127 ft / 38.7 m	22°19′46″N 73°13′10″E	Gujarat	36 Wing	No. 11 Squadron No. 25 Squadron	
Training Command								
Begumpet AFS	VOHY	09/27; 14/32	1,741 ft / 531 m	17°27′08″N 78°27′40″E	Telangana			
Bidar AFS	VOBR	02/20; 08/26	2,178 ft / 663 m	17°54′28″N 77°29′09″E	Karnataka			
Dundigal AFS	VODG	10L/28R; 10R/28L	2,013 ft / 614 m	17°37′45″N 78°24′12″E	Telangana			
Hakimpet AFS	VOHK	09/27	2,020 ft / 616 m	17°33′12″N 78°31′29″E	Telangana			
Yelahanka AFS	VOYK	09/27	3,045 ft / 928 m	13°08′09″N 77°36′20″E	Karnataka			
Admin Training Inst, Sambra, Belgaum			2,500 ft / 762 m	15°51′00″N 74°30′00″E	Karnataka			
Maintenance Command								
Nagpur AFS	VANP	09/27; 14/32	1,012 ft /308 m	21°05′31″N 79°02′49″E	Maharashtra	44 Wing		
Ojhar AFS	VAOZ	08/26	1,900 ft / 579 m	20°07′10″N 073°54′49″E	Maharashtra	11 BRD		
Chandigarh AFS	VICG	11/29	1,012 ft / 308 m	30.676290°N 76.788535°E	Chandigarh	12 Wing/3 BRD		
Kanpur AFS	VECX	09/27	410 ft / 126 m	26.3994624°N 80.4269499°E	Uttar Pradesh	1 BRD/4 BRD		
Devlali AFS				19°51′18.36″N 73°48′13.5″E	Maharashtra	Helicopter Maintenance Unit		

The other Air Force stations that come under Maintenance Command are not air stations and are mostly signal units and station repair depots situated in different towns. Delhi, for example, has a few BRDs and SUs that come under Maintenance Command.

== List of advance landing grounds ==
=== Along China border ===
The Chinese Military has an integrated Western Theater Command across the LAC with India. The Indian military has divided the LAC into 3 sectors - the Western Sector across Ladakh and Chinese-held Aksai Chin, the Central Sector across Himachal Pradesh and Uttarakhand states, and the Eastern Sector across Sikkim and Arunachal Pradesh. Similarly, the Indian Airforce has the Delhi-based Western Air Command, Prayagraj-based Central Air Command, and Shillong-based Eastern Air Command to cover the LAC.

- Ladakh
  - Daulat Beg Oldi ALG, serves the Trans-Karakoram Tract (Shaksgam), Aksai Chin and the Siachen Glacier.
  - Kargil Airport ALG
  - Fukche ALG, serves the Demchok sector.
  - Padum ALG, serves Ladakh LAC and Kargil LOC as a second line of defence airport.
  - Thoise ALG
  - Parma Valley ALG near Chushul (to be reactivated).
- Himachal Pradesh has a 250 km border with Tibet (China).
  - Shimla Airport, civil airport available for military use. Serves the Kaurik, Tashigang-Shipki La and Nelang-Pulam Sumda disputed area.
  - Kullu-Manali Airport, civil airport available for military use. Serves the Kaurik, Tashigang, Shipki La, and Nelang-Pulam Sumda disputed area.
  - Kibber-Rangrik, surveyed as of July 2020, construction was approved in January 2023 to be completed by 2024–25. Will be the closest ALG to Chumar, Kaurik, and Tashigang-Shipki La disputed area.
- Uttarakhand has a 350 km border with Tibet.
  - Chinyalisaur Airport ALG serves the disputed Barahoti and Nelang-Pulam Sumda sectors. ITBP has 42 BoPs (border outposts) in Barahoti sector and Mana Pass area (Nelang-Pulam Sumda sector).
  - Pithoragarh Airport ALG serves the disputed Kalapani territory.
  - Gauchar Airport ALG.
- Sikkim
  - Pakyong Airport AGL serves the Doklam disputed area.
- Arunachal Pradesh
  - Aalo ALG, formerly Along.
  - Mechuka Advanced Landing Ground.
  - Pasighat ALG
  - Tawang Air Force Station
  - Tuting ALG
  - Vijoynagar ALG
  - Walong Advanced Landing Ground.
  - Ziro ALG
  - Daporijo ALG.
  - Alinye ALG, Dibang Valley District.
    - To be reactivated as of September 2025. The airstrip was utilised by the United States Air Force as a staging ground during The Hump airlift campaign of World War II. Following Indian Independence, the strip was converted into a mud-paved runway. However, plans to revive the facility never went through and it has not seen combat service since 1947.
  - Hayuliang ALG, Anjaw District.

=== Along Pakistan border ===
- Ladakh
  - Thoise ALG

== List of road runways ==
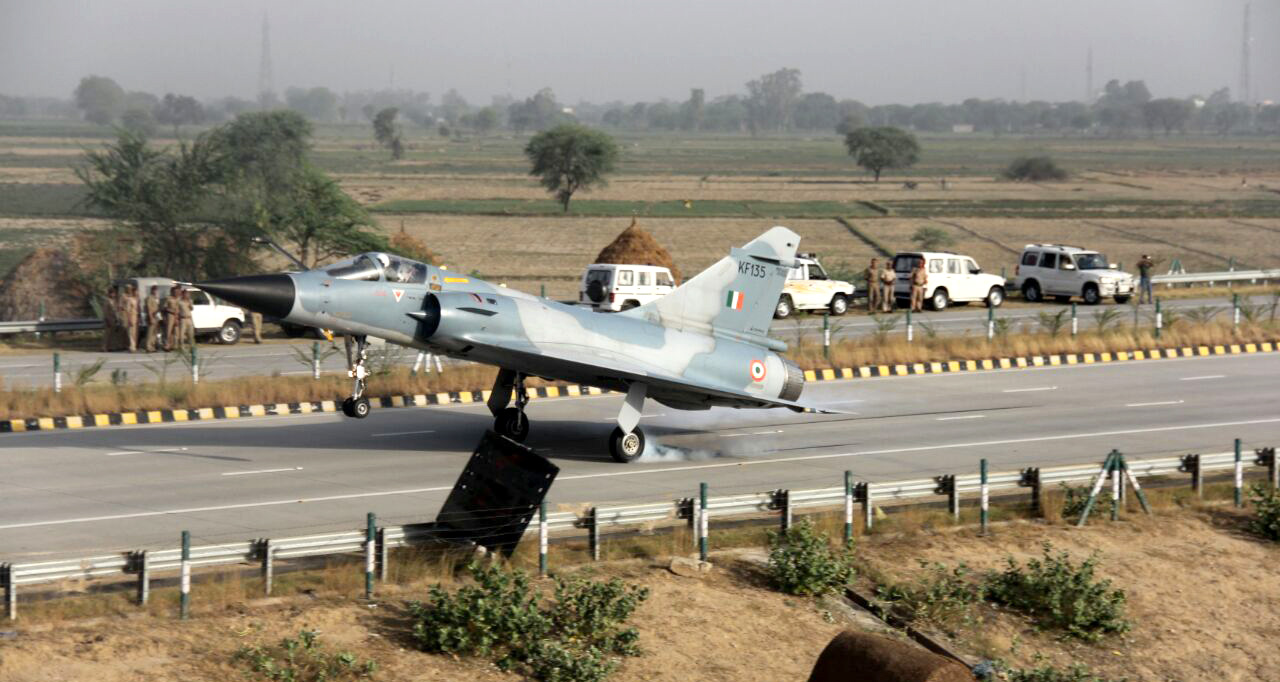
IAF Mirage 2000 landing on the Yamuna Expressway ELF field.

In India, road runways are called 'emergency landing facilities' (ELF). ELFs are activated in the states of Uttar Pradesh, Rajasthan, Andhra Pradesh,Assam and union territory of Jammu and Kashmir. A total thirteen locations have been chosen for development of such road runways.

- Yamuna Expressway: India has successfully tested its road runway on a stretch of the Yamuna Expressway in Uttar Pradesh on 21 May 2015. It was built at a cost of ₹130 billion for its combat jets of the Indian Air Force (IAF), a first for military aviation in the country. In June 2016, the Minister of Road Transport and Highways, Nitin Gadkari announced that the government was considering developing 'road runways' for commercial operations as well.
- Agra–Lucknow Expressway (Lucknow): The Bangarmau Airstrip is located 65 km (40 mi) from Lucknow on the expressway and has been tested multiple times since 2015 with fighter aircraft and military transport aircraft.
- National Highway 925 (Barmer): on 9 September 2021, the Minister of Road Transport and Highways, Nitin Gadkari, and the Minister of Defence, Rajnath Singh, inaugurated India's first road runway on a National Highway NH925 in Barmer, Rajasthan and, a mock emergency landing was conducted with the two ministers and the Air Chief Marshal R. K. S. Bhadauria on-board a military transport aircraft.
- National Highway 16 (Bapatla): an emergency landing facility airstrip was activated on National Highway 16 on 18 March 2024. The 4.1 kilometres (2.5 miles) long by 33 metres (108 feet) wide strip has been constructed by the National Highways Authority of India. Aircraft, including Sukhoi Su-30MKI, BAE Systems Hawk, Antonov An-32, and Dornier 228, conducted landing trials on the same day.
- National Highway 44 (Anantnag): an ELF was tested on 2 April 2023 from 03:45 to 04:30 am in Jammu and Kashmir's Anantnag district. The road runway is 3.5 kilometres (2.2 miles) long. Five helicopters, including two Chinook, two Dhruv, and one Mi-17 of IAF were part of the trial. It also included Sukhoi Su-30MKI and HAL Tejas. The road runway construction started in 2020 at a cost of ₹119 crore (equivalent to ₹140 crore or US$15 million in 2023).
- Ganga Expressway: Indian Air Force fighter jets and transport aircraft conducted landing and take-off drills on 2 May 2025 from its 3.5 km (2.2 mi)-long airstrip on the Expressway near Shahjahanpur. This is the first such airstrip in India with night landing capacity. To assess the capability the drill was conducted in two phases in both day and night (9 pm to 10 pm IST). The aircraft included Su-30MKI, Mirage 2000, MiG-29, Jaguar, C-130J Super Hercules, An-32, and the Mi-17 V5 helicopter.
- Moran Bypass: An ELF was activated on the Moran Bypass of National Highway-37 in the Dibrugarh district, Assam on 14 February 2026. Built at a cost of Rs.100 crores,It was inaugurated with a landing by an IAF C-130J during the Prime Minister's visit to the state.Spanning over 4.6 kilometres,It is the First ELF located in Northeast India.

== See also ==
Similar capabilities lists

- India-China Border Roads
- Indian military satellites
- List of active Indian Air Force aircraft squadrons
- List of Indian Navy bases
- List of active Indian Navy ships
- India's overseas military bases
- Indian Nuclear Command Authority

Other related topics

- Armed Forces Special Operations Division
- Defence Cyber Agency
- Integrated Defence Staff
- Indian Armed Forces
- Strategic Forces Command
- Special Forces of India
