= Western Air Command (India) =

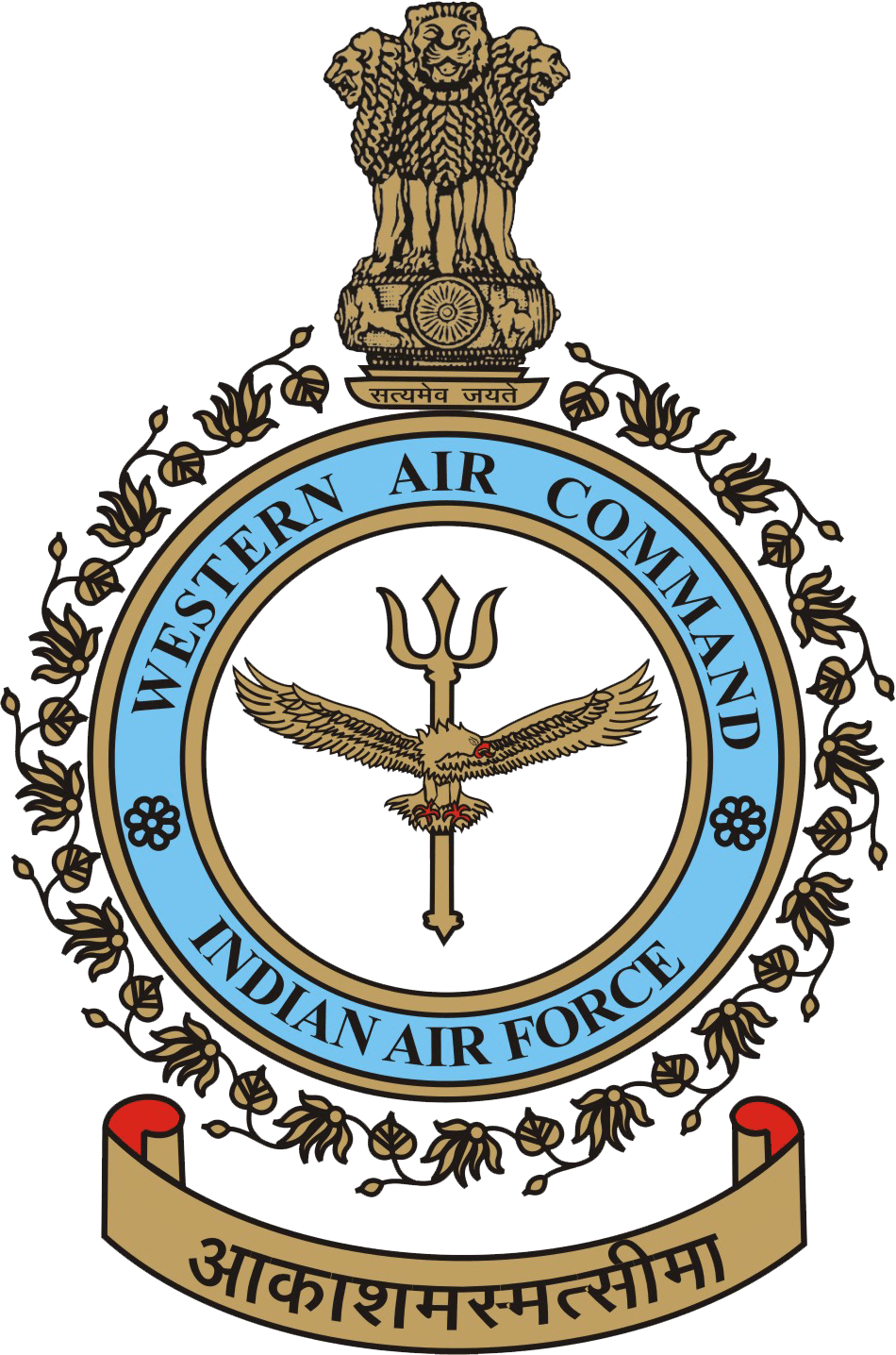
- Insignia of Western Air Command
- Founded: July 22, 1949
- Country: India
- Branch: Indian Air Force
- Type: Operational Air Command
- Role: Air Defence, OCA, Offensive Ground Support, Civilian Relief.
- Headquarters: New Delhi
- Motto: Sanskrit: Akashamasmatseema
- Engagements: 1962 Sino-Indian War, 1971 India-Pakistan War, Operation Meghdoot

Commanders
- Air Officer Commanding-in-Chief(AOC-in-C): Air Marshal George Thomas, AVSM, VM
- Notable commanders: Air Marshal MSD Wollen; Air Chief Marshal Anil Yashwant Tipnis; Air Chief Marshal Arup Raha; Air Chief Marshal Norman Anil Kumar Browne; Air Chief Marshal Srinivasapuram Krishnaswamy

The Western Air Command (WAC) is the regional command of Indian Air Force headquartered in New Delhi. It is the largest of the IAF, comprising sixteen Air Force Bases (AFBs), and is responsible for aerial defence of North India.

WAC's Area of Responsibility extends from Jammu and Kashmir to Rajasthan, also covering the states of Himachal Pradesh, Punjab, Haryana, New Delhi and Western Uttar Pradesh.

== History ==
WAC was raised in 1947 as the No. 1 Operational Group which controlled all the flying units of Indian Air Force, including the flying training units. On July 22, 1949, the No. 1 Operational Group was re-designated as the Operational Command. In 1958, the rank of the Air Officer Commanding the Operational Command was upgraded from Air Commodore to Air Vice Marshal and later, to the rank of Air Marshal, with the post also upgraded to Air Officer Commanding-in-Chief.

In the aftermath of the India-China War of 1962, the IAF began the process of demarcation of specific areas of responsibility, and splitting up of the flying Corps into various operational air commands. On June 10, 1963, Operational Command assumed its present name of Headquarters Western Air Command.

Due to its geographical location in the crucial North Indian region, surrounded by Pakistan to the west and China to the East, WAC has been involved in all major operations in India since independence, and has been the hub-centre of all operational activities during any operation.

The IAF Western Air Command is engaged in air logistics operations to supply troops deployed at Siachen Glacier. These operations are undertaken from the Siachen Forward Air Base, using Mi-17, HAL Dhruv and HAL Cheetah helicopters.

The Western Air Command has been the major operational command involved in most of the war fought by India, including the Indo-Pakistani War of 1947, Sino-Indian War in 1962, the Indo-Pakistani War of 1965, Indo-Pakistan War of 1971, Operation Pawan (1986) in Sri Lanka and Operation Safed Sagar during the 1999 Kargil War.

== Organization ==
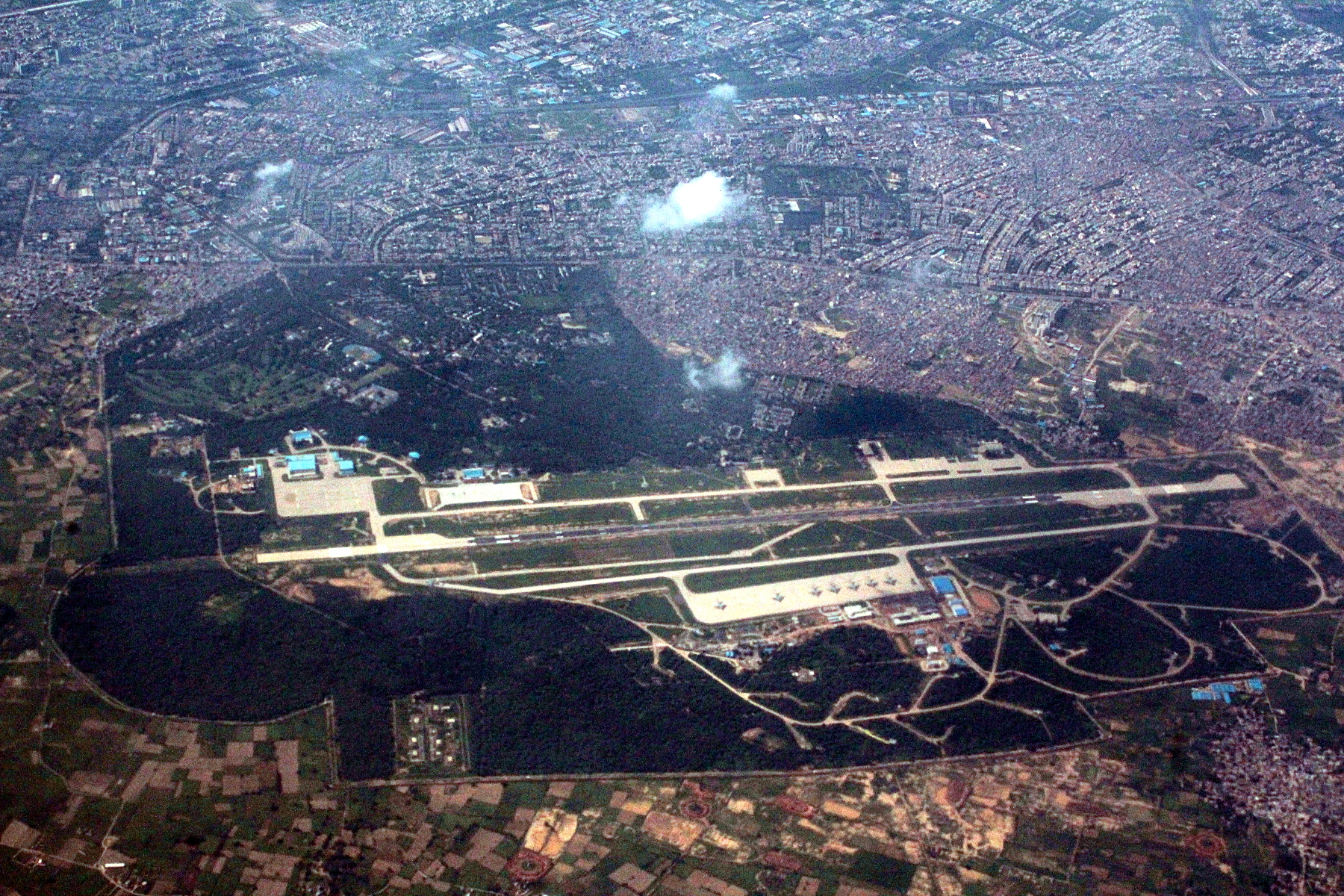
Hindon AFS

Western Air Command is headquartered at Subroto Park, New Delhi. It is headed by an Air Officer Commanding-in-Chief, WAC, of the rank of Air Marshal. Under the C-in-C come the Senior Air Staff Officer, Senior Maintenance Staff Officer and Senior Officer in Charge of Administration, who are of the ranks of Air Vice Marshal or Air Marshal. They handle the day-to-day activities of the Command and act as the liaison between the various Wings.

WAC also has a forward headquarters located at Chandigarh near the Army's Western Command. There is an Air Operations Group, formed in 1982, located at Udhampur, Jammu and Kashmir, which is principally tasked with the defence of Jammu & Kashmir and Ladakh.

No. 224 Squadron, Indian Air Force was raised in July 1983 at Adampur and operated with WAC until its disbandment in 2007. Squadrons include:

Location of WAC Air Bases

Squadron	Base	Equipment	Notes
No. 41 Squadron IAF	Palam Air Force Station	Avro 748 & Do-228M	No. 3 Wing
No. 3 Squadron IAF	Pathankot Air Force Station	MiG-21 Bison	No. 7 Wing
No. 125 Helicopter Squadron IAF	Pathankot Air Force Station	Boeing Apache	
No. 5 Squadron IAF	Ambala Air Force Station	Jaguar IS	No. 7 Wing
No. 14 Squadron IAF	Ambala Air Force Station	Jaguar IS	No. 7 Wing
No. 17 Squadron IAF	Ambala Air Force Station	Dassault Rafale	No. 7 Wing
No. 47 Squadron IAF	Adampur Air Force Station	Mig-29	No. 8 Wing
No. 223 Squadron IAF	Adampur Air Force Station	Mig-29	No. 8 Wing
No. 220 Squadron IAF	Halwara Air Force Station	Su-30 MKI	No.9 Wing
No. 221 Squadron IAF	Halwara Air Force Station	Su-30 MKI	No.9 Wing
No. 25 Squadron IAF	Chandigarh Air Force Station	Il-76/AN-32	No. 12 Wing
No. 48 Squadron IAF	Chandigarh Air Force Station	AN-32	No. 12 Wing
No. 126 Helicopter Flight, IAF	Chandigarh Air Force Station	Mi-26/Chinook	No. 12 Wing
No. 114 Helicopter Unit, IAF	Leh Air Force Station	HAL Cheetah	No. 23 Wing IAF
No. 130 Helicopter Unit, IAF	Leh Air Force Station	Mi-17	No. 23 Wing IAF
No. 129 Helicopter Unit, IAF	Hindon Air Force Station	Mi-17	No. 28 Wing
No. 131 Helicopter Flight, IAF	Hindon Air Force Station	HAL Cheetah	No. 28 Wing
No. 181 Helicopter Flight, IAF	Hindon Air Force Station	Avro 748M	No. 28 Wing
No. 117 Helicopter Unit, IAF	Sarsawa Air Force Station	HAL Dhruv	No. 30 Wing
No. 152 Helicopter Unit, IAF	Sarsawa Air Force Station	Mi-17	No. 30 Wing
No. 132 Helicopter Flight, IAF	Udhampur Air Force Station	HAL Cheetah	No. 39 Wing
No. 153 Helicopter Unit, IAF	Udhampur Air Force Station	Mi-17	No. 39 Wing
No. 15 Squadron IAF	Sirsa Air Force Station	Su-30MKI	No. 45 Wing
No. 51 Squadron IAF	Srinagar Air Force Station	Mig 21 Bison	

=== Air Bases ===
WAC has been assigned 10 permanent Air Force Stations (AFS)and 6 Forward Base Support Units (FBSUs), including the strategic Forward Air Base at Siachen. Along with these, WAC also has over 200 operational bases, Advance Landing Grounds (ALGs), and Operational centres placed under its command.

The Air Force Stations/Wings under WAC control are:

==== Forward Base Support Units (FBSU) ====
Base	ICAO	Runway	Elevation	Coordinates	State/Territory
Amritsar AFS	VIAR	16/34	755 ft / 230 m	31°42′27.95″N 74°47′57.25″E	Punjab
Bathinda AFS	VIBT	13/31	700 ft /213 m	30°16′12.50″N 74°45′20.78″E	Punjab
Sarsawa AFS	VISP	09/27	891 ft / 272 m	29°59′39.53″N 77°25′27.25″E	Uttar Pradesh
Siachen Glacier AFS			22,000 ft / 6,706 m	35.5°N 77.0°E	Ladakh
Sirsa AFS	VISA	05/23	650 ft / 198 m	29°33′38.09″N 75°00′21.87″E	Haryana
Udhampur AFS	VIUX	18/36	1,950 ft / 594 m	32°54′08.06″N 75°09′18.54″E	Jammu & Kashmir

== List of Commanders ==
Rank	Name	Assumed office	Left office
Air Officer Commanding No. 1 Operational Group
Air Commodore	Mehar Singh	22 December 1947	27 September 1948
Air Commodore	Aspy Engineer	27 September 1948	21 July 1949
Air Officer Commanding Operational Command
Air Commodore	Aspy Engineer	22 July 1949	11 December 1950
Air Commodore	Arjan Singh	12 December 1950	11 December 1952
Air Commodore	Atma Ram Nanda	12 December 1952	7 December 1955
Air Commodore	Arjan Singh	8 December 1955	30 April 1958
Air Officer Commanding-in-Chief Operational Command
Air Vice Marshal	Arjan Singh	1 May 1958	17 November 1959
Air Vice Marshal	Erlic Wilmot Pinto	17 November 1959	9 June 1963
Air Officer Commanding-in-Chief Western Air Command
Air Vice Marshal	Erlic Wilmot Pinto	10 January 1963	22 November 1963
Air Vice Marshal	Pratap Chandra Lal	24 November 1963	30 September 1964
Air Vice Marshal	Ramaswamy Rajaram	1 October 1964	4 March 1966
Air Vice Marshal	Shivdev Singh	5 March 1966	29 February 1968
Air Marshal	Shivdev Singh	1 March 1969	31 July 1969
Air Marshal	Minoo Merwan Engineer	6 August 1969	31 March 1973
Air Marshal	Hrushikesh Moolgavkar	1 April 1973	31 January 1976
Air Marshal	Edul Jahangir Dhatigara	1 February 1976	3 September 1978
Air Marshal	Dilbagh Singh	1 October 1978	31 December 1980
Air Marshal	Lakshman Madhav Katre	5 January 1981	28 February 1983
Air Marshal	Malcolm Shirley Dundas Wollen	1 March 1983	30 September 1981
Air Marshal	Denis Anthony Lafontaine	1 November 1981	2 July 1985
Air Marshal	Man Mohan Singh	22 July 1985	31 July 1988
Air Marshal	Prithi Singh	1 August 1988	30 April 1992
Air Marshal	Swaroop Krishna Kaul	1 May 1992	31 July 1993
Air Marshal	Pratap Rao	3 September 1993	5 July 1994
Air Marshal	Satish Kumar Sareen	6 July 1994	31 July 1995
Air Marshal	Anil Yashwant Tipnis	1 August 1995	31 March 1997
Air Marshal	Vinod Patney	1 April 1997	31 October 1999
Air Marshal	Srinivasapuram Krishnaswamy	1 November 1999	1 July 2001
Air Marshal	Vinod Kumar Bhatia	1 August 2001	28 April 2002
Air Marshal	Adi Rustomji Ghandhi	29 April 2002	16 November 2003
Air Marshal	Shashindra Pal Tyagi	16 November 2003	31 December 2004
Air Marshal	Avdesh Kumar Singh	1 January 2005	31 January 2007
Air Marshal	Padamjit Singh Ahluwalia	1 February 2007	31 December 2007
Air Marshal	Pranab Kumar Barbora	1 January 2008	31 May 2009
Air Marshal	Norman Anil Kumar Browne	1 January 2009	31 December 2010
Air Marshal	Dinesh Chandra Kumaria	1 January 2011	31 May 2012
Air Marshal	Arup Raha	1 June 2012	30 June 2013
Air Marshal	Suneet Shripad Soman	1 July 2013	31 August 2015
Air Marshal	Shirish Baban Deo	1 September 2015	31 December 2016
Air Marshal	Chandrashekharan Hari Kumar	1 January 2017	28 February 2019
Air Marshal	Raghunath Nambiar	1 March 2019	31 October 2019
Air Marshal	Balakrishnan Suresh	1 November 2019	31 July 2020
Air Marshal	Vivek Ram Chaudhari	1 August 2020	30 June 2021
Air Marshal	Balabhadra Radha Krishna	1 July 2021	30 September 2021
Air Marshal	Amit Dev	1 October 2021	28 February 2022
Air Marshal	Sreekumar Prabhakaran	1 March 2022	31 December 2022
Air Marshal	Pankaj Mohan Sinha	1 January 2023	31 December 2024
Air Marshal	Jeetendra Mishra	1 January 2025	30 April 2026
Air Marshal	George Thomas	1 May 2026	Present
