= Kargil War order of battle =

Organization of the Indian Army during the Kargil War

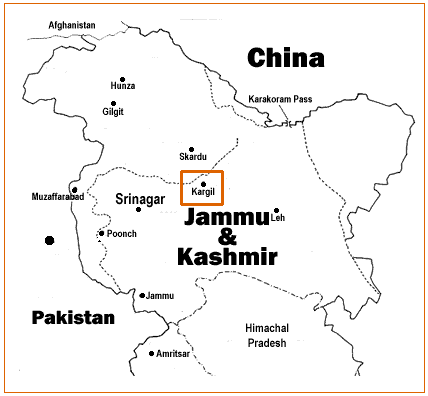
US Navy map of Kargil, 2008.

The Kargil War order of battle (KWORBAT), is a deposition and systematic combatant structure of Indian Army troops and the unified Pakistan Armed Forces combat commands, active in the Kargil region in 1999, during the Kargil War. The Indian Army orbat is based on publications provided by Indian military authors, news media and official sources.

== India ==
Indian Army infantry battalions were often transferred between brigade commands during the war, so they sometimes appear under multiple brigades.

=== Indian Army ===
Northern Command (Lt. Gen. H. M. Khanna)

- XV Corps (Lt. Gen. Kishan Pal)
  - XV Corps Artillery Brigade (Brig. Lakhwinder Singh)
  - HQ 8 Mountain Division (Maj. Gen. Mohinder Puri)
    - 8 Mountain Artillery Brigade
    - 56 Mountain Brigade (Brig. A. N. Aul)
      - 1st Battalion, Naga Regiment (Col. D.A. Patil)
      - 2nd Battalion, 5th Gorkha Rifles
      - 2nd Battalion, Rajputana Rifles (Col. M. B. Ravindranath)
      - 3rd Battalion, Rajputana Rifles
      - 18th Battalion, Garhwal Rifles
      - 13th Battalion, Jammu and Kashmir Rifles (Lt. Col. Yogesh Kumar Joshi)
      - 1st Battalion, 3rd Gorkha Rifles
      - 9th Battalion, Parachute Regiment Special Forces
      - ATGM Detachment, 17th Battalion, Brigade of the Guards
    - 192 Mountain Brigade
      - 18th Battalion, The Grenadiers (Col. Kushal Thakur)
      - 8th Battalion, Sikh Regiment
      - 9th Battalion, Para (Special Forces)
      - ATGM Detachment, 17th Battalion, Brigade of the Guards
  - 50 (Independent) Parachute Brigade (Brig. Prabodh Chandra Bhardwaj)
    - 6th Battalion, Parachute Regiment
    - 7th Battalion, Parachute Regiment
    - 1st Battalion, Parachute Regiment (Special Forces)
    - ATGM Detachment, 19th Battalion, Brigade of the Guards
  - 79 Mountain Brigade (XV Corps reserve)
    - 17th Battalion, Jat Regiment (Col Umesh Singh Bawa)
    - 28th Battalion, Rashtriya Rifles
    - 12th Battalion, Mahar Regiment
    - 2nd Battalion, Naga Regiment
  - 3rd Infantry Division (Maj Gen V.S. Budhwar)
    - 2 Engineer Regiment
    - 3 Artillery Brigade
    - 70 Infantry Brigade (Brig. Devinder Singh)
      - 1st Battalion, 11th Gorkha Rifles (Col. Lalit Rai)
      - 12th Battalion, Jammu and Kashmir Light Infantry
      - 10th Battalion, Parachute Regiment (Special Forces)
      - 1st Battalion, Bihar Regiment
      - Ladakh Scouts
      - 17th Battalion, Garhwal Rifles
      - 5th Battalion, Parachute Regiment
      - 14th Battalion, Sikh Regiment
      - ATGM Detachment, 19th Battalion, Brigade of the Guards
    - 102 (Independent) Infantry Brigade
      - 11th Battalion, Rajputana Rifles
      - 9th Battalion, Mahar Regiment
      - 13th Battalion, Kumaon Regiment
      - 27th Battalion, Rajput Regiment
      - High Altitude Warfare School Permanent Cadre Detachment
      - ATGM Detachment, 19th Battalion, Brigade of the Guards
    - 121 (Independent) Infantry Brigade (Brig. Surinder Singh till 9 June 1998, Brig O. P. Nandrajog after 9 June)
      - 16th Battalion, The Grenadiers
      - 4th Battalion, Jat Regiment
      - 3rd Battalion, Punjab Regiment
      - 10th Battalion, Garhwal Rifles
      - 8th Battalion, Border Security Force
      - ATGM Detachment, 17th Battalion, Brigade of the Guards

Kargil Theatre Artillery
These units took part in the war serving under various formations:

- 4 Field Regiment (now 4 Medium Regiment (Self Propelled))
- 15 Field Regiment (now 15 Medium Regiment)
- 41 Field Regiment
- 108 Medium Regiment (now 108 Field Regiment)
- 114 Medium Regiment
- 139 Medium Regiment
- 141 Field Regiment (now 141 Medium Regiment)
- 153 Medium Regiment (now 153 Medium Regiment (Self Propelled))
- 158 Medium Regiment (Self Propelled)
- 197 Field Regiment (now 197 Medium Regiment)
- 212 Rocket Regiment
- 831 Light Regiment
- 244 Heavy Mortar Regiment (now 244 Field Regiment)
- 253 Medium Regiment
- 255 Field Regiment (now 255 Medium Regiment)
- 286 Medium Regiment (now 286 Field Regiment)
- 305 Medium Regiment (now 305 Field Regiment)
- 307 Medium Regiment
- 315 Field Regiment
- 1861 Light Regiment
- 1889 Light Regiment (now 1889 Missile Regiment)

Other battalions

  - 5th Battalion, Special Frontier Force
  - 663 Reconnaissance & Observation Squadron
  - 668 Reconnaissance & Observation Squadron
  - 13th Battalion, Punjab Regiment
  - 12th Battalion, The Grenadiers
  - 22nd Battalion, The Grenadiers
  - 7th Battalion, Jat Regiment
  - 14th Battalion, Sikh Light Infantry
  - 9th Battalion, Rashtriya Rifles
  - 14th Battalion, Rashtriya Rifles
  - 17th Battalion, Rashtriya Rifles
  - 11th Battalion, Sikh Regiment
  - 3rd Battalion, Jammu and Kashmir Rifles
  - 16th Battalion, Dogra Regiment
  - 5th Battalion, Rajput Regiment
  - 9th Battalion, Mahar Regiment
  - 10th Battalion, Parachute Regiment (Special Forces)
  - 21st Battalion, Parachute Regiment (Special Forces)

=== Indian Air Force ===
Apart from the involvement of the Indian Army, the Indian Air Force (IAF) also participated in the Kargil War as part of Operation Safed Sagar.

IAF Order of Battle
| Squadron number | Squadron Name | Equipment | Commanding Officer |
|---|---|---|---|
Combat Aircraft
| No. 1 Squadron IAF | Tigers | Mirage 2000H | Wing commander S. Neelakanthan |
| No. 7 Squadron IAF | Battle Axes | Mirage 2000H | Wing commander Sandeep Chabbra |
| No. 9 Squadron IAF | Wolfpack | MiG-27ML | Wing commander Avtar Singh |
| No. 14 Squadron IAF | Bulls | SEPECAT Jaguar IS/IB | Wing commander Ashwani Bhakoo |
| No. 17 Squadron IAF | Golden Arrows | MiG-21M | Wing commander BS Dhanoa |
| No. 27 Squadron IAF | Flaming Arrows | SEPECAT Jaguar IS | Wing commander HKJS Shokay |
| No. 28 Squadron IAF | First Supersonics | MiG-29B | Wing commander PM Cherian Wing commander P Randhava |
| No. 51 Squadron IAF | Sword Arms | MiG-21 Bis | Wing commander NK Tandon |
| No. 102 Squadron IAF | Trisonics | MiG-25R | Group Captain SP Ojha |
| No. 106 Squadron IAF | Lynxes | Canberra PR.57 | Group Captain RS Chaudhari |
| No. 108 Squadron IAF | Hawkeyes | MiG-21M | Wing commander HS Jalliawala |
| No. 221 Squadron IAF | Valiants | MiG-23 BN | Wing commander Ashit Mehta |
| No. 223 Squadron IAF | Tridents | MiG-29B | Wing commander Sandeep Sud |
Transport aircraft
| No. 25 Squadron IAF | Himalayan Eagles | An-32 / Il-76 | Group Captain SP Singh |
| No. 48 Squadron IAF | Camels | An-32 | Group Captain Mk Devnath |
Helicopter Units
| No. 114 Helicopter Unit IAF | Siachen Pioneers | HAL Cheetah | Wing commander AS Butola |
| No. 129 Helicopter Unit IAF | Nubra Warriors | Mil Mi-17 | Wing commander AK Sinha |
| No. 152 Helicopter Unit IAF | Mighty Armours | Mil Mi-17 | Wing commander S Mittal |
| No. 130 Helicopter Unit IAF | Condors | Mil Mi-8 | |
| No. 132 FAC Flight IAF | | HAL Cheetah | Wing commander OS Ahluwalia |

In addition, the IAF also deployed three observation flights, five radar units, three units of Pechora SAMs as well as a large battery of Osa and Igla units.

=== Indian Navy ===
As a part of Operation Talwar, the Indian Navy deployed a flotilla under the light carrier INS Viraat to the Arabian Sea.

== Pakistan ==
Initially, the Kargil order of battle was planned by the Directorate-General for Military Operations (DGMO), Brig. Gen. Nadeem Ahmed. However, after IAF strikes and Indian advances in the region, the Pakistan Air Force and the Navy deployed and issued orders to their combat forces. Their missions were to conduct surveillance and air patrolling; no other combat units of PAF and Navy participated in the combat. The inter-services order of battle is mentioned in the table. According to the Pakistan news channels reports and military declassified information, the Kargil infiltration was comprehensively planned by the joint officers at the Joint staff Headquarters, a joint office secretariat which then-served under General Pervez Musharraf.

From the start of the conflict, there were numerous inter-services meetings coordinated by the chairman joint chiefs, to Prime Minister Nawaz Sharif. The controversy still surrounds in the military science circle of the Pakistan armed forces, with chief of naval staff and chief of air staff including key theatre commanders of army combatant corps, bringing up the accusations that the Kargil front was launched without their knowledge or confidence.

=== Pakistan Army ===
- 5th Battalion, Northern Light Infantry Regiment
- 6th Battalion, Northern Light Infantry Regiment
- 12th Battalion, Northern Light Infantry Regiment
- 13th Battalion, Northern Light Infantry Regiment
- 24th Battalion, Sindh Regiment
- 27th Battalion, Sindh Regiment

=== Pakistan Air Force ===
- Note: No PAF F-16s took active participation in the conflict. All PAF missions were to conduct combat air patrols in the area.
  - No. 38 Multirole Group
  - No. 9 Squadron Griffins and No. 11 Squadron Arrows.
      - The F-16s belonging to Griffins Arrows were deployed in the region. No F-16s had active participation in the conflict.

=== Pakistan Navy ===
- Note: No Navy units had active participation. The Navy was on high-alert but strictly ordered by Admiral Fasih Bokhari not to escalate the crisis into sea. Although, Navy had its own significance in the Kargil theatre, but no crucial operations and efforts were applied or undertaken by Navy to support the army. According to the chief of naval staff, General Pervez Musharraf, as chairman joint chiefs, had failed to take the navy into confidence before the start of the conflict.
  - Pakistan Navy Commander Karachi
  - Pakistan Naval Air Arm
    - The Pakistan Navy, in a defensive mood, directed all its units to keep clear of Indian naval ships. As the exercise shifted closer to the Makran Coast, Pakistan moved all its major combatants out of Karachi. The Navy remained on high-alert, although orders were not to escalate the crises to sea. The Navy launched surveillance operations; Karachi port remained on high-alert.

== Sources ==
- Indian Army – Kargil War 1999 v.2.0 8 March 2006 Mandeep S. Bajwa & Ravi Rikhye
- Kargil Committee Report Executive Summary
