= No. 181 Flight, IAF =

No. 181 Flight
- Active: 5 August 1978–present
- Country: India
- Role: Airborne early warning and control
- Garrison/HQ: Hindon AFS, Delhi
- Nickname: "Hawks"
- Mottos: Sadaiva Satark; Ever Vigilant

Aircraft flown
- Electronic warfare: Hawker Siddeley 748-R; Boeing 737 SIGNIT

No. 181 Flight is a unit of the Indian Air Force assigned to Western Air Command. The squadron participates in electronic intelligence, reconnaissance, Airborne early warning and control operations.

== History ==
181 Flight was initially formed as 171 Flight at Palam with two Hawker Siddeley 748-R aircraft.

== Aircraft ==
- Hawker Siddeley 748-R
- Boeing 737-200
