= Mudh-Nyoma Air Force Station =

Airbase in India

- Nyoma, Leh district, Ladakh, India; Near Nyoma in India
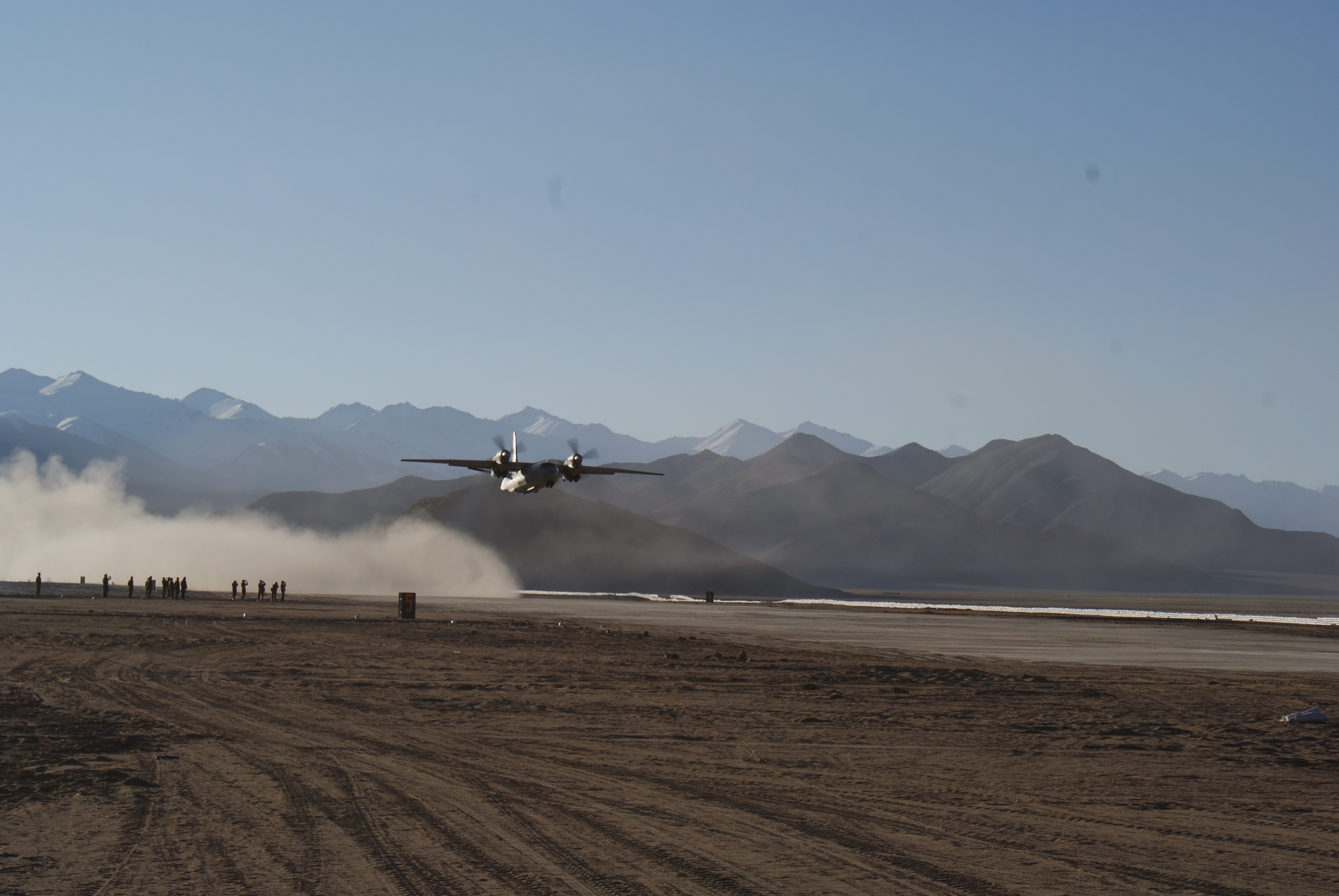
- Indian Air Force's An-32 taking off from Nyoma ALG (now Mudh-Nyoma Air Force Station) on 18 September 2009.

Site information
- Type: Military Airbase
- Controlled by: Indian Air Force
- Open to the public: no

Location
- Coordinates: 33°10′N 78°43′E

Site history
- In use: 2009–present

Mudh-Nyoma Air Force Station (formerly, Nyoma Advanced Landing Ground) is an Indian Air Force base located near Nyoma in the Leh district of Ladakh, India. The base is located at 13,700 feet (4,200 m) above sea level, near the Line of Actual Control.

== History ==
The Nyoma airfield was one of the airfields originally inaugurated during 1962 India-China War. However, the Nyoma airstrip remained unused until April 2009 when it was being prepared to serve as an advanced landing ground (ALG) to support fixed-wing aircraft operations. It entered operational service on 18 September 2009 when the IAF landed an Antonov An-32 transport aircraft there. The aircraft was flown by SC Chafekar, a then Group Captain-ranked officer, and carrying the then commanding officers of Western Air Command and Northern Command of the Army, NAK Browne and P C Bhardwarj, respectively. This was the third ALG to be opened in Ladakh in two years, including the one at Daulat Beg Oldi and Fukche. The airbase is only 23 km (14 mi) away from the Line of Actual Control.

In the last week of December 2022, the Border Roads Organisation (BRO) invited bids to upgrade the airfield to a full-fledged air base to support fighter aircraft and minor maintenance operations. The project budget was estimated at ₹214 crore (equivalent to ₹247 crore or US$26 million in 2026). The establishment is spread across 1,235 acre land and located at an altitude of 13,700 feet (4,200 m). The base is equipped with an over 2.7 km (8,900 ft) along with allied military infrastructure.

The project commenced in the third week of August 2023. There were three full-fledged operational air bases in Ladakh including Leh, Kargil and Thoise Air Force Station along with the two ALGs at Daulat Beg Oldi and Fukche.

The foundation stone was laid by the Minister of Defence, Rajnath Singh, in September 2023. The infrastructure project was led by a team of women officers from the BRO.

By October 2024, 95% of the work for Runway at the airbase is complete. The runway was ready for emergency use by all aircraft including fighter aircraft. The base would be formally commissioned in September 2025 after allied infrastructure like hangars, an air traffic control building, and hard-standing areas are completed.

As of July 2025, the Mudh air base at Nyoma is expected to be operationalised by October that year. The 46 m (151 ft)-wide runway is fully operational, while the supporting infrastructure—such as the ATC complex, hangar, crash bay, watch towers, and accommodation facilities—is also nearly complete.

By 1 November 2025, the airbase had been reportedly operationalised by the Air Force. The project was undertaken under Project Himank, with a budget of ₹230 crore (equivalent to ₹238 crore or US$25 million in 2026). A small hume pipe culvert has been cleared for construction to facilitate movement across the Indus River.

The Mudh-Nyoma Air Base was formally inaugurated by the Chief of the Air Staff, Air Chief Marshal Amar Preet Singh, on 12 November 2025. He landed on a C-130J aircraft and was accompanied by the commanind officer of the Western Air Command, Air Marshal Jeetendra Mishra.

== Operations ==
The airstrip was utilised for helicopter operations between 1962 and 2009. Until 2025, the base also supported the operations of fixed-wing aircraft, including transport aircraft like the C-130J, from its compacted runway.

The air base was utilised during the 2020–2021 China–India skirmishes when a helicopter fleet including heavy-lift CH-47 Chinook, medium-lift Mi-17 and AH-64 Apache attack helicopters to support ground troops in forward deployment including surveillance and intelligence gathering operations.

The full-fledged air base will be available for fighter aircraft operations from early 2026.
