= No. 81 Squadron IAF =

No. 81 Squadron SkyLords
- Crest of The No. 81 Squadron IAF "SkyLords"
- Active: 1 September 2013 - Present
- Country: Republic of India
- Allegiance: Indian Armed Forces
- Branch: Indian Air Force
- Role: Transport
- Garrison/HQ: Hindon AFS
- Nickname: "Sky Lords"
- Mottos: सक्षम, सबल, सर्वत्र: (Capable, Powerful, Omnipresent)

Aircraft flown
- Transport: Boeing C-17 Globemaster III

No. 81 Squadron IAF nicknamed as SkyLords is a unit of the Indian Air Force assigned to Western Air Command. The Squadron participates in operations involving air, land and airdrop of troops, equipment, supplies, and support or augment special operations forces, when appropriate. It is responsible for heavy lift operations of the IAF and is based at the Hindan Air Force Station. The squadron operates 11 Boeing C-17 Globemaster IIIs.

== History ==
First C-17 was delivered in January 2013 and the sixth C-17 aircraft was received in July 2014. Boeing delivered 11th and last aircraft in August 2019. It was constituted as No. 81 Squadron (Sky Lords) on 1 September 2013

== Operations ==
The squadron is the workhorse of any operation that require heavy lift for the Indian Armed Forces or the Government of India. It has been deployed in vast number of varied scenarios that include transportation of oxygen tanks to India during the medical oxygen shortage in India caused by the COVID-19 pandemic in India. The Sky Lords carried out rapid troop deployment by India in Ladakh during the 2020-21 border India-China standoff. The 81st Squadron has also carried out evacuation of Indians and foreign nationals from volatile regions during uncertain situations. These include the 2015 Yemen crises, rescue and relief sorties to Nepal during April 2015 Nepal earthquake, evacuation of Indians from war torn South Sudan in 2016. It also airlifted Indians, many Afghan MPs, Afghan Sikhs and Hindus, and the staff of Indian embassy in Afghanistan after Taliban took over Kabul following US troop pullout. It has also had foreign deployments to Tajikistan in August 2013, and to Rwanda to support Indian peacekeepers. The squadron has carried out numerous other humanitarian and military operations.

== Aircraft ==
Boeing C-17 Globemaster III
