= No. 157 Helicopter Unit, IAF =

No. 157 Helicopter Unit
- Active: 9 April 2012-Present
- Country: Republic of India
- Branch: Indian Air Force
- Garrison/HQ: Barrackpore AFS
- Nickname: "Tarkshya"
- Mottos: No Better Friend, No Worse Enemy

Aircraft flown
- Attack: Mil Mi-17V5

No. 157 Helicopter Unit is a Helicopter Unit and is equipped with Mil Mi-17V5 and based at Barrackpore Air Force Station.

== History ==
=== Aircraft ===
- Mil Mi-17V5
