= No. 154 Helicopter Unit, IAF =

No. 154 Helicopter Unit
- Active: 2013 - Present
- Country: Republic of India
- Branch: Indian Air Force
- Garrison/HQ: Srinagar AFS
- Mottos: Apatsu Mitram; A friend in time of need

Aircraft flown
- Attack: Mil Mi-17 V5

No. 154 Helicopter Unit is a Helicopter Unit and is equipped with Mil Mi-17 V5 and based at Srinagar Air Force Station.

== History ==
=== Assignments ===
Op Megh Rahat Op Rahat 2013 Op Meghdoot

=== Aircraft ===
- Mil Mi-17
