= No. 51 Squadron IAF =

No. 51 Squadron
- Insignia of the 51st Squadron
- Active: 1 February 1985 – 30 September 2022
- Country: Republic of India
- Branch: Indian Air Force
- Role: Fighter
- Garrison/HQ: Srinagar AFS
- Nickname: Sword Arms
- Mottos: Yudhya Mahaspara Bhayankara which means "valour for victory"
- Equipment: Mig-21
- Engagements: 2019 Jammu and Kashmir airstrikes

No. 51 Squadron "Sword Arms" was a fighter squadron of the Indian air force, based in Srinagar Air Force Station. The squadron was under the western command of Indian Air Force.

== History ==
No.51 Squadron was initially raised in AFS Chandigarh in 1985, then being equipped with MiG-21 Type 75 variant which later went on to be upgraded to the MiG-21 Bison variant. The squadron was shortly relocated to AFS Srinagar. The Squadron was officially disbanded on 30 September 2022 following the Decommissioning of the MiG-21 Fighter Aircraft in its fleet. Following which it was taken over by No.223 Squadron of MiG-29UPG Aircraft.

== Notable Incidents ==
On 27 February 2019, the squadron was scrambled to intercept an intrusion by Pakistan aircraft into Jammu and Kashmir. Among the intercepting aircraft, was Wing Commander Abhinandan Varthaman's MiG-21.

It was claimed by local villagers that Varthaman could be identified as an Indian pilot by the Indian flag on his parachute. Upon landing, Varthaman asked the villagers if he was in India. The locals responded with pro-Pakistan slogans, after which Varthaman began to run while firing warning shots. He ran for approximately 500 metres, to a small pond, where he attempted to sink and swallow some of his documents. Subsequently, he was captured and manhandled by the villagers before being captured by the Pakistan Army.

== Aircraft ==
Aircraft	From	To	Air Base
MiG-21 Bis	1 February 1985	January 2004	AFS Chandigarh
MiG-21 Bison	January 2004	30 September 2022	AFS Srinagar
