= No. 131 Helicopter Flight, IAF =

No. 131 Helicopter Flight
- Active: 2 August 1974 - Present
- Country: India
- Branch: Indian Air Force
- Role: Search and Rescue; Humanitarian Assistance and Disaster Relief (HADR); Casualty evacuation
- Garrison/HQ: Thanjavur AFS
- Nickname(s): "Eagle Eyes"
- Motto(s): Savage and Powerful

Aircraft flown
- Transport: HAL Cheetah

No. 131 Helicopter Flight (Eagle Eyes) is a helicopter unit and is equipped with HAL Cheetah and HAL Chetak. The unit is currently operating from Thanjavur Air Force Station (47 Wing) under the aegis of the Southern Air Command since 20 March 2024. It serves the purpose of Search and Rescue, Humanitarian Assistance and Disaster Relief (HADR) and Casualty evacuation roles.

The unit, nicknamed Airborne Pointers, was originally established on 2 August 1974 at Pathankot Air Force Station for Forward Air Control or Light Observation missions. Eventually the unit was shifted to Udhampur AFS in 1975 to Halwara AFS in 1987. From late 1990s to December 2021 the unit was based at Hindon Air Force Station.

== History ==
=== Aircraft ===
- HAL Cheetah
- HAL Chetak
