= Thoise Air Force Station =

Thoise
- Village
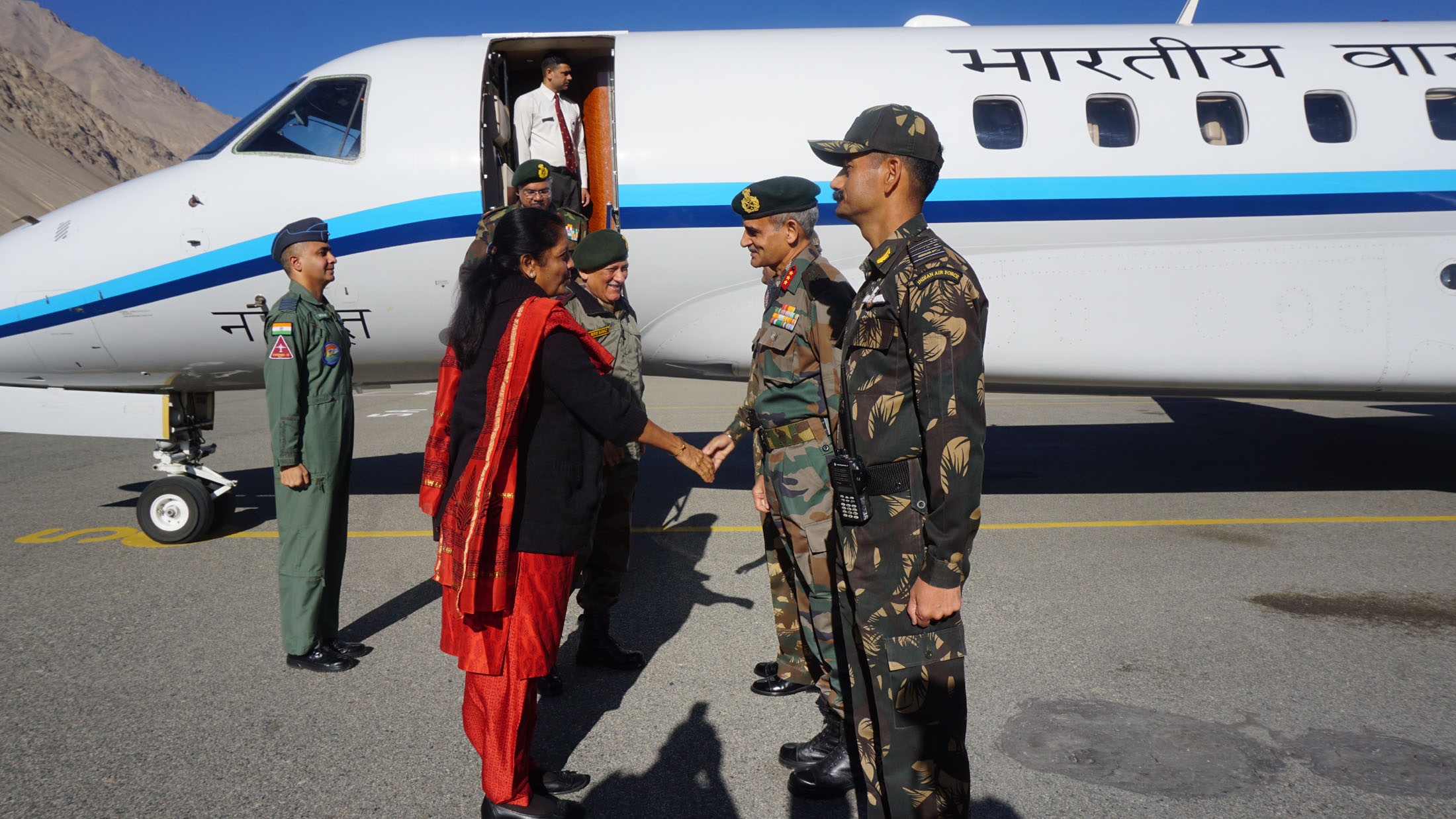
- Minister of Defence Nirmala Sitharaman at Thoise in 2017

- Location in Ladakh, India Thoise (India)
- Coordinates: 34.65°N 77.38°E
- Country: India
- Union Territory: Ladakh
- District: Nubra
- Tehsil: Diskit
- Elevation: 3,070 m (10,070 ft)

Languages
  - Spoken: Hindi, Ladakhi, Urdu
- Time zone: UTC+5:30 (IST)
- PIN: 194401

Thoise or Thoise Air Force Station is a military airfield (ICAO: VI57) and small village in Nubra region of Ladakh, India, occupying the only large piece of flat land in the area. The airstrip is a critical facility enabling a quick inflow of men and material from the Indian interior to Siachen, a glacier, helipad and battleground near the Actual Ground Position Line between India and Pakistan.

Thoise is nearly 16 km from Hundar, 25 km from Diskit, and the road further leads to Turtuk which lies near the India-Pakistan Line of Control (LoC). It is about 160 km from Leh, the capital of Ladakh. Thoise is reached via the Khardung La mountain pass, one of the world's highest roads used by motor vehicles.

The Ladakh administration plans to launch civilian flights from the airport by December 2026, after refurbishing the existing chartered-flight terminal at the airport. The Indian Air Force has also approved the allotment of 5 acres of land to the Airports Authority of India (AAI) for construction of a new civil terminal.

== Background ==
=== Etymology ===
THOISE is a real name and not an acronym for Transit Halt Of Indian Soldiers Enroute (to Siachen). The information about Thoise being an acronym is incorrect. Thoise air strip was constructed in 1960 and the first landing took place on September 26, 1960 - Siachen operations started a quarter century later on April 13, 1984 - so there is no link to troops going to Siachen in its name. It is most probably the name of a village there. Thoise is about an hour and 20 minutes flight from Delhi. Air India has limited flight operations from "Thoise" to Delhi (Flight AI 3832). Jet Airways operated flights to THOISE until the decision was made to curtail operations due to financial non-viability towards the end of January 2019. With less than 12 qualified commercial pilots the world over, this is an extremely tricky airfield to operate into. Special background clearance and multiple stringent skill tests must be passed by the pilots in order to be able to operate to Thoise. The last checkpost is at Hundar, at a bridge where photography is not permitted. Indian Oil Corporation Limited is building an oil depot to serve the Indian Army. The construction project is in progress and is monitored from Chandigarh.

=== History ===
On 30 April 2019, Group Captain Sandeep Singh Chhabra of the Indian Air Force achieved the rare distinction of having completed 1,000 incident-free landings of the Russian-origin heavy lift IL-76 aircraft at Leh and Thoise.

== Military and Air Force station ==
Due to the extreme conditions and lack of connectivity with the outside world, IAF aircraft have been instrumental in the resupply of this remote region. IAF's IL-76 aircraft are all operated by No. 44 Squadron, which is based at the Chandigarh Air Force Station. Capable of airlifting up to 45 tonnes of payload, these aircraft have played an instrumental role in ferrying men and equipment, including tanks, artillery guns and construction equipment to the northern sector. They have also airlifted large quantities of relief material during disaster management in cases of natural calamities, and have undertaken overseas missions.

== See also ==
Military bases

- List of ALGs
- List of Indian Air Force stations
- India-China military deployment on LAC
- List of disputed India-China areas
- Tianwendian
- Ukdungle

Borders

- Actual Ground Position Line (AGPL)
- India–Pakistan International Border (IB)
- Line of Control (LoC)
- Line of Actual Control (LAC)
- Sir Creek (SC)
- Borders of China
- Borders of India

Conflicts

- Kashmir conflict
- Siachen conflict
- Sino-Indian conflict
- List of disputed territories of China
- List of disputed territories of India
- List of disputed territories of Pakistan
- Northern Areas
- Trans-Karakoram Tract

Operations

- Operation Meghdoot, by India
- Operation Rajiv, by India
- Operation Safed Sagar, by India

Other related topics

- India-China Border Roads
- List of extreme points of India
- Sino-Pakistan Agreement for transfer of Trans-Karakoram Tract to China
- Defence Institute of High Altitude Research
- Indian Astronomical Observatory
