= No. 11 Squadron IAF =

No. 11 Squadron Charging Rhinos
- Insignia of The No. 11 Squadron IAF "Charging Rhinos"
- Active: 1 December 1945- Present
- Country: Republic of India
- Allegiance: Indian Armed Forces
- Branch: Indian Air Force
- Role: Transport
- Garrison/HQ: Vadodara AFS
- Nickname: "Charging Rhinos"
- Mottos: Vishwambhara Pranadah; Supporters of the Universe

Aircraft flown
- Transport: Airbus C-295

No. 11 Squadron nicknamed as Charging Rhinos is a unit of the Indian Air Force assigned to South Western Air Command. The squadron participates in operations involving air, land and airdrop of troops, equipment, supplies, and support or augment special operations forces, when appropriate.

== History ==
The No. 11 Squadron were raised in 1951 at Barrackpore and Jorhat and moved to the present location.

It became the first squadron of the IAF to operate the Airbus C-295 in September 2023.

=== Lineage ===
- Constituted as No. 11 Squadron (Charging Rhinos) on 15 November 1951

=== Assignments ===
- Indo-Pakistani War of 1965
- Indo-Pakistani War of 1971

=== Aircraft ===
- C-47
- Douglas DC-3
- HS-748
- Airbus C-295
