= No. 126 Helicopter Flight, IAF =

No. 126 Helicopter Flight
- Active: 15 May 1986- Present
- Country: Republic of India
- Branch: Indian Air Force
- Garrison/HQ: Chandigarh AFS
- Nickname: "Featherweights"

Aircraft flown
- Transport: Mil Mi-26, CH-47

No. 126 Helicopter Flight (Featherweights) is a helicopter squadron and is equipped with Mil Mi-26 and based at Chandigarh Air Force Station. It received the first four Boeing CH-47 Chinook in service on 25 March 2019.

== History ==
Only four Mi-26s served with this Helicopter Flight: serial numbers Z2896, Z2897, Z3075 and Z3076. Only three aircraft are presently in the inventory. On 14 December 2010, an Indian Air Force Mi-26 (serial number Z3076) crashed seconds after taking off from Jammu Airport, injuring all nine passengers. The aircraft fell from an altitude of about 15 metres (50 ft). The Indian Institute of Flight Safety released an investigation report that stated improper fastening of the truck inside caused an imbalance of the helicopter and led to the crash. The Mi-26 had been carrying machines from Konkan Railway to Jammu–Baramulla line project.

Two of the remaining three Mi-26s were grounded on completion of their total technical life in September 2013 and August 2014, respectively; a proposal of having the helicopters shipped to the Mil Moscow Helicopter Plant for refurbishment has not been approved by the Ministry of Defence for over three years. On 25 March 2019, the first four CH-47F (I) Chinook helicopters (of a total of 15 ordered) were added to the flight.

=== Assignments ===
This helicopter Flight has carried out extensive flood relief operations Ex-Tezpur in Jan 1989. It also did a commendable job by laying out the roads in Anini sector in the east. Anini sector was earlier totally air maintained. Being a helicopter flight, it can be called upon to carry out casualty evacuation etc.

The flight airlifted Diesel Generators, to ensure continued cooling of the Ammonia Storage tanks at the Paradeep Phosphates Limited plant in Paradip, Odisha, thus preventing another Bhopal Disaster-like situation. The flight was also actively involved in the Kargil War wherein it performed missions by day and night.

=== Aircraft ===
- Mil Mi-26
- Boeing CH-47 (I) Chinook
