= No. 156 Helicopter Unit, IAF =

No. 156 Helicopter Unit
- Active: 23 January 2012 - Present
- Country: Republic of India
- Branch: Indian Air Force
- Garrison/HQ: Bagdogra AFS
- Nickname: "Armoured Kestrels"
- Motto: Sahase Shauryam Sevasya Siddham

Aircraft flown
- Attack: Mil Mi-17V5

No. 156 Helicopter Unit is a Helicopter Unit and is equipped with Mil Mi-17V5 and based at Bagdogra Air Force Station.

== History ==
=== Aircraft ===
- Mil Mi-17V5
