= No. 132 Helicopter Flight, IAF =

No. 131 Helicopter Flight
- Active: 24 February 1986 - Present
- Country: Republic of India
- Branch: Indian Air Force
- Role: Light Observation Helicopter; Forward Air Control
- Garrison/HQ: Udhampur AFS
- Nickname: "Hovering Hawks"

Aircraft flown
- Attack: HAL Cheetah

No. 132 Helicopter Flight (Hovering Hawks) is an Indian Forward Air Control Helicopter squadron and is equipped with a 16-aircraft fleet of HAL Chetak and Cheetah and based at Udhampur Air Force Station.

== History ==
=== Aircraft ===
- HAL Cheetah
