= Vadodara Airport =

Airport serving Vadodara, Gujarat, India

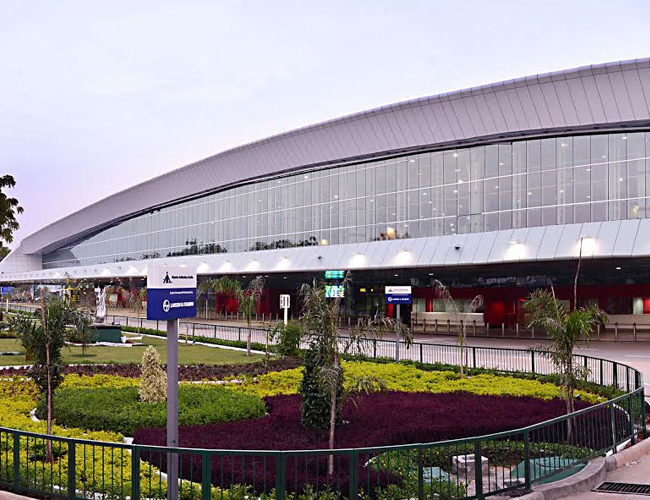
- IATA: BDQ; ICAO: VABO

Summary
- Airport type: Public/Military
- Owner/Operator: Airports Authority of India
- Serves: Vadodara
- Location: Harni, Vadodara, Gujarat, India
- Focus city for: IndiGo
- Elevation AMSL: 38.7 m (127 ft)
- Coordinates: 22°19′46″N 73°13′10″E

Maps
- Location within Gujarat Location within India
- Interactive map of Vadodara Airport

Runways
Direction	Length		Surface
Direction	m	ft	Surface
04/22	2,469	8,100	Asphalt

Statistics (April 2025 - March 2026)
- Passengers: 12,98,410 (▲2.7%)
- Aircraft movements: 8,778 (▲1.9%)
- Cargo tonnage: 1,718.7 (▼6.2%)
- Source: AAI

Vadodara Airport (IATA: BDQ, ICAO: VABO) is a customs airport and Indian Air Force base serving the city of Vadodara in Gujarat, India. It is located in the suburb of Harni, northeast of Vadodara. It is the third-busiest airport in Gujarat, after Ahmedabad and Surat airports. In 2020, it was ranked the second-cleanest airport in India by the Airports Authority of India.

== Terminals ==
The existing domestic terminal at Vadodara Airport, named after the Maharaja of Baroda State, is distinct from other airports due to its mix of Gujarati architectural styles and domes on the roof. The terminal is small and cannot handle large numbers of passengers. The old terminal covers 4,519 square meters and can handle 250 passengers.

To increase the capacity of the airport and launch international services, it was decided to construct a new Integrated Terminal Building. An international architectural design competition was held to create designs for the new terminal. Eventually, a design submitted by United States–based consortium Gensler, Frederic Schwartz Architects, and Creative Group from India won the competition and the contract to design the new terminal was awarded to them.

The foundation stone for the new terminal was laid on 26 February 2009. Construction work started in May 2011 and had been completed by August 2016. The new terminal has an area of 18,120 square meters and the ability to handle 700 passengers (500 domestic and 200 international) per hour. The new terminal has eighteen check–in counters. The AAI also recently constructed a night parking facility at the airport which can park about nine Airbus A320 or Boeing 737 aircraft, thus reducing the burden at Mumbai Airport and Ahmedabad Airport, proving economical for airlines.

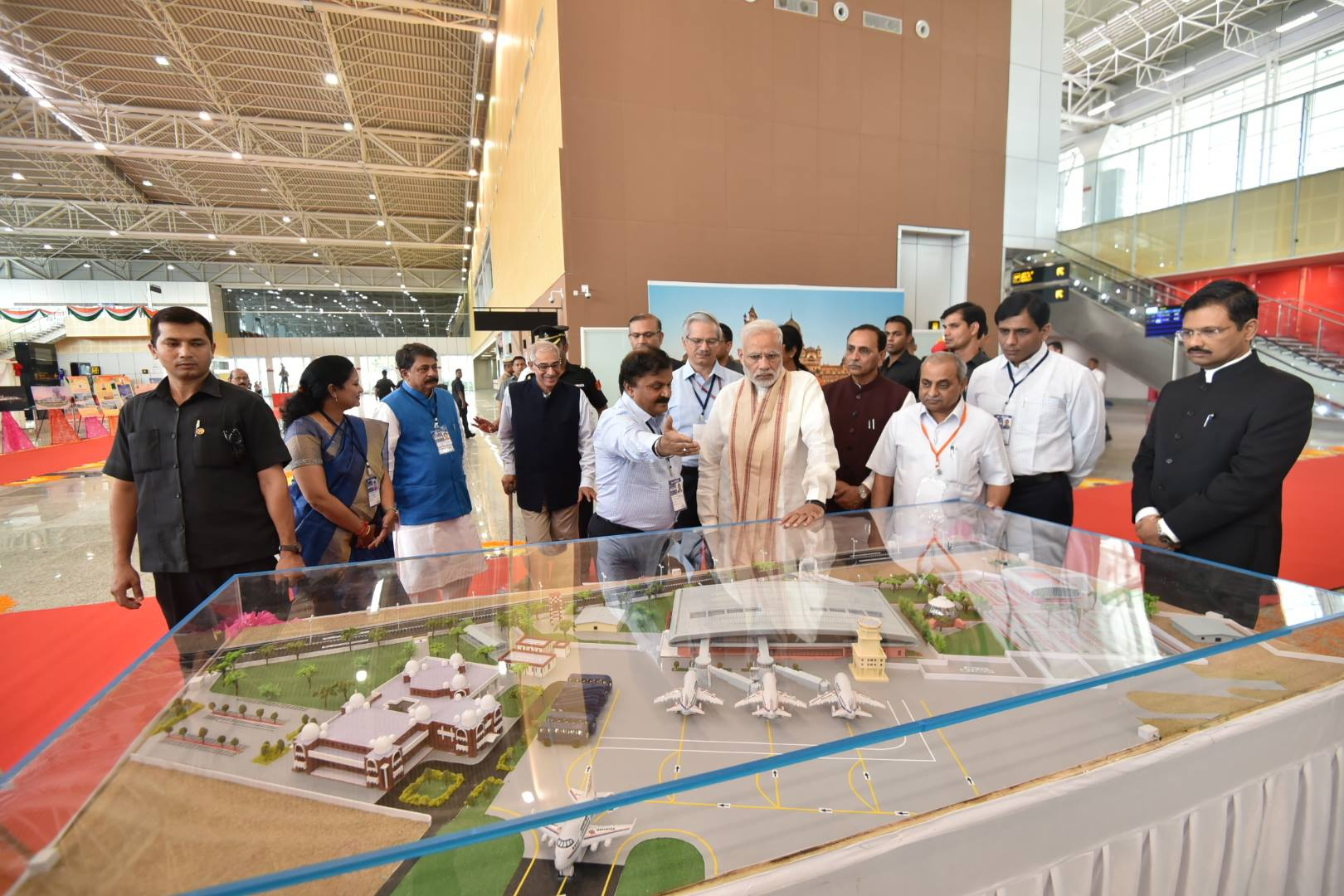
Prime Minister Narendra Modi views a model of the new terminal building at Vadodara.

The new terminal building was inaugurated by Prime Minister of India Narendra Modi on 22 October 2016. The terminal, constructed at a cost of 1.6 billion rupees, is the greenest domestic airport of india and also the second-greenest airport of India, after Cochin International Airport. The new terminal area also houses a garden featuring artwork and sculptures by local artists. (Vadodara is known for its culture, art, and education; it is the Cultural Capital of Gujarat). The new terminal building also holds the world record for the longest single sheet rooftop, measuring at 164.2 meters. Currently, the airport does not handle cargo.

Vadodara Airport received the Swachh Bharat Award in 2019 for the cleanest and safest airport in the category of airports having an annual passenger handling capacity of upto 1.5 million.

== IAF Station Vadodara ==
In addition to its own state–of–art MRO facility for HS 748 and AN-32 aircraft at Vadodara, the Indian Air Force has two transport squadrons, operating under No. 36 Wing IAF, South Western Air Command:

- No. 11 Squadron IAF, Charging Rhinos, which operates C-295 aircraft. (HS 748 transport aircraft being phased out)
- No. 25 Squadron IAF, Himalayan Eagles, equipped with AN-32 aircraft. This squadron moved here from Chandigarh in September 2011.

== C295 Final Assembly Line ==
Tata Advanced Systems has facilities at the airport. The final assembly of the Airbus C295 is carried out here. The foundation stone of this Final Assembly Line (FAL) complex was laid in October 2022 and the complex was inaugurated in October 2024 and will manufacture India's first private defence aircraft from the ground up. The first ‘Make in India’ C295 will roll out of the Vadodara FAL in September 2026.

== Airlines and destinations ==
Airlines	Destinations
Air India	Delhi, Mumbai
IndiGo	Bengaluru, Delhi, Chennai, Goa–Mopa, Hyderabad, Navi Mumbai, Mumbai, Pune

== Accidents and incidents ==
- On 1 July 1995, an East West Airlines Fokker F-27, registered as VT-EWE, was engaged in a training touch–and–go exercise at the airport when the aircraft's left main landing gear failed on touchdown. The aircraft continued moving forward on its belly and skidded to a halt on the runway. There was no fire and no injury to people on board the aircraft. Poor maintenance was cited as a contributory factor in the accident. The aircraft was written off, and is now abandoned near the wall surrounding the airport premises mid-runway.
