= No. 117 Helicopter Unit, IAF =

No. 117 Helicopter Unit
- Active: 1 Feb 1971 – present
- Country: Republic of India
- Branch: Indian Air Force
- Garrison/HQ: Sarsawa AFS
- Nickname(s): "Himalayan Dragons"
- Motto(s): "SHAKTI SAHAS SHAURYAM" "Strength Courage Valor"

Aircraft flown
- Transport: Mil Mi-8, HAL Dhruv MK.III

No. 117 Helicopter Unit (Himalayan Dragons) is a Helicopter Unit equipped with Mil Mi-8 and based at Sarsawa Air Force Station.

== History ==
=== Aircraft ===
- Mil Mi-8
- HAL Dhruv
