= Hindan Air Force Station =

Air Force Station Hindon
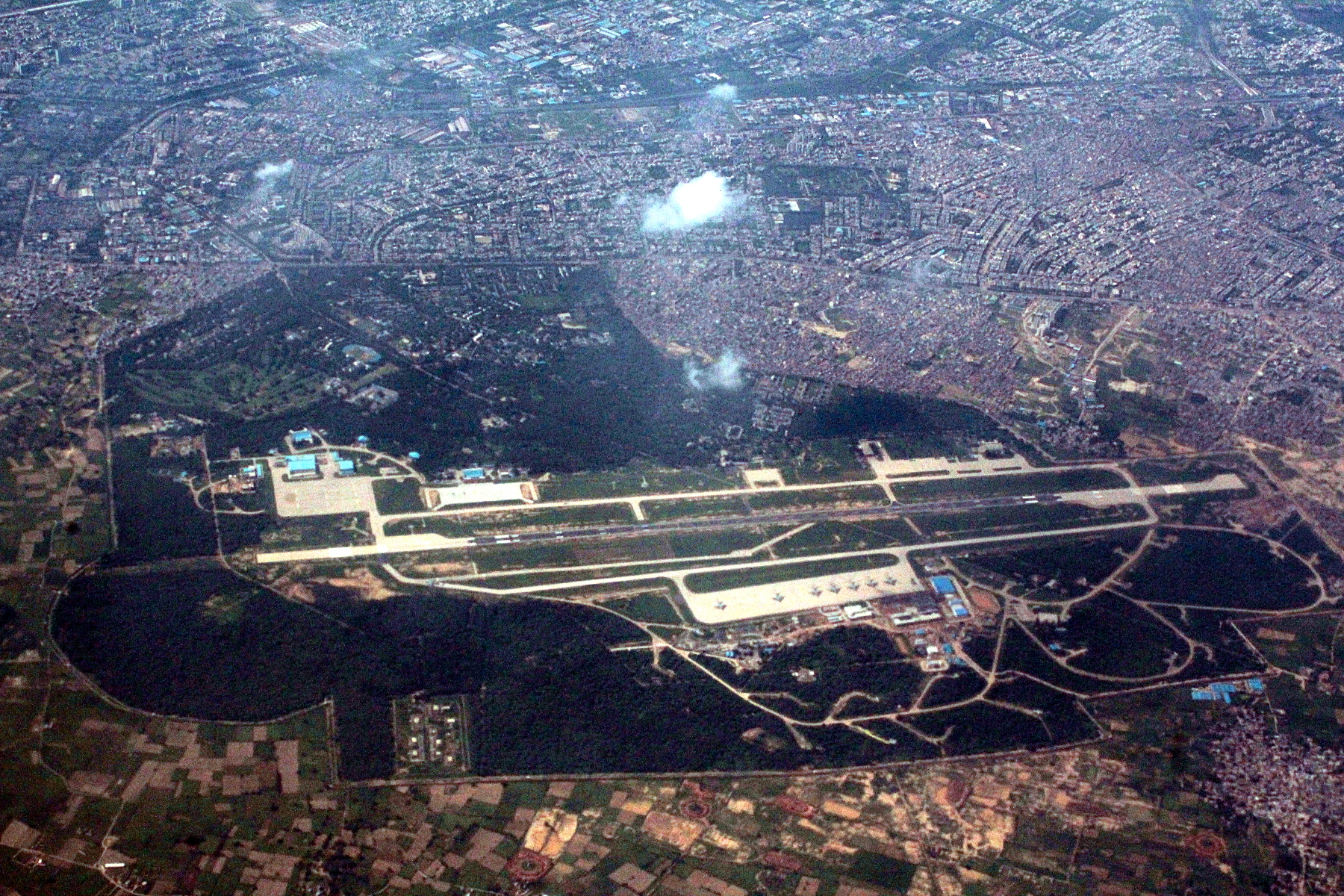
- Aerial view of Hindon Air Base
- IATA: HDO; ICAO: VIDX

Summary
- Airport type: Military (Indian Air Force)
- Operator: Western Air Command
- Location: Ghaziabad, Uttar Pradesh
- Elevation AMSL: 700 ft (210 m)
- Coordinates: 28°42′28″N 77°21′30″E

Map
- Location within Uttar Pradesh Location within India

Runways
Direction	Length		Surface
Direction	ft	m	Surface
09/27	9,000	2,743	Asphalt concrete

Air Force Station Hindon (Hindon AFS) (also Hindon) is an Indian Air Force base under the Western Air Command (WAC). Its area measured 14 km rounded and 10.25 square kilometres (3.96 sq mi). This base celebrates Air Force Day on 8 October. It is located near Loni Ghaziabad in the state of Uttar Pradesh it also serves traffic of National Capital Region on the outskirts of Delhi, close to the Hindon River. Starting 2006, the annual Air Force Day Parade venue was shifted from Indira Gandhi International Airport to Hindon. There is one runway, aligned east–west (09-27), of 9,000 feet (2,700 m) length x 150 feet (46 m) width. The military airbase serves as the home of the IAF C-17 Globemaster and the IAF C-130J Super Hercules, the backbone of Strategic Heavy Air Lift division of the Indian Air Force. The Airports Authority of India (AAI) operates a civil enclave at Hindon as part of the government's Regional Connectivity Scheme (RCS).

== Units ==
- No. 77 Squadron (Lockheed C-130J Super Hercules)
- No. 81 Squadron (Boeing C-17 Globemaster III)
- No. 129 Helicopter Unit (Mil Mi-17IV)
- No. 131 Helicopter flight (HAL Cheetah)

== History ==
Originally the base was home to a squadron each of MiG-23s single-engine fighters and MiG-27s single-engine ground-attack aircraft. After the 1965 war, No. 7 Squadron IAF moved to Hindon along with Hawker Hunters, and stayed here till 1969, when it moved to Bagdogra in West Bengal, subsequently during the East Pakistan Operations 1971 it flew in on 6 December 1971. Prior to the No. 3 Squadron moved here in July 1971 and was operating Mystère IVAs at the time. After the war it moved back to Hindon, until it shifted base to Pathankot in 1975.

In the mid-1980s, it was identified by ornithologist Dr. Salim Ali among the 10 air bases in India prone to bird hits, due to the presence of slaughterhouses and dumping grounds in its vicinity being close to the Ghaziabad industrial city. In the coming years, the number of accidents increased.

Finally in 1997, when three plane crashes occurred within a span of few days, Hindon was abandoned as a fighter base and remained home to Avros and Mi-17 helicopters and transport aircraft in the following years, apart from being used by the IAF Aircrew Examination Board.

However, in 2003, with growing terrorist threats, its importance as a strategic air base to provide air cover to the capital was realised, as Hindon-based fighters could reach the skies over New Delhi within five minutes as compared to the 15-plus minutes it would take from other closest bases, namely Sirsa Air Force Station, Ambala Air Force Base and Chandigarh Air Force Station, and thus Hindon was reactivated and area around it was cleaned up. September 2005, saw Air Chief Marshal S.P. Tyagi becoming the first Chief of Air Staff to earn para wings while in office, as he finished his fifth and final para jump at Air Force Station Hindon.

In 2006, Indian Air Force shifted its 74th-anniversary celebration venue from Palam Airport in Delhi, to Hindon to avoid airspace closure for commercial traffic, where the Air Force Day Parade cum investiture ceremony was held on 8 October, and an air display by 66 aircraft. This also gave the IAF aircraft more air space during the air show, till then was uses primarily as a helicopter base. After that it has become an annual event at the station.

On 1 June 2007, Chief of Air Staff Air Chief Marshal F. H. Major flagged off a microlight expedition, part of the IAF's Platinum Jubilee celebrations, aiming to creating a record by completing the expedition, Around the World in 80 Days. Wing Commanders Rahul Monga and Anil Kumar reached Hindon back on 19 August, and covering 40,497 km in 80 days they achieved a speed of 21.092 km/h thus beating the previous record of 16.53 km/h set by Colin Bodil of the U.K. in 2001. Although the FAI ( Fédération Aéronautique Internationale - world governing body for air sports, aeronautics and astronautics world records) has denied their claim as both the pilots and the Indian Air Force could not furnish any proof for such a feat.

In 2007, when the Airports Authority of India (AAI) and the Indian Air Force (IAF) launched a pilot project to test joint management of the airspace, Hindon was opened to civilian flights, though its open for flights only during stipulated hours of the day.

After the 26/11 Mumbai terrorist attacks IAF moved MiG-29s to the air base in order to protect the capital from aerial threats.

Hindon was amongst nine airfields in the Western Air Command (WAC) for the Modernization of Air Field Infrastructure programme (MAFI), started in 2009. Due its proximity to the Delhi, work at the station which included equipping it with sensitive radars was to commence first. This work completed in 2011 when the first of six C-130J Hercules tactical transport aircraft arrived from the US. Hindon was designated to become home base for these aircraft and for this purpose, the Hindon runway was extended and modern hangars, servicing and operations facilities suitable for the C-130J aircraft were added. Hindon currently hosts 18 C-130J's.

In June 2011, the IAF signed a contract with the USAF to purchase 10 Boeing C-17 Globemaster III's. With the No. 81 Squadron bed down, the contract includes a dual-bay hangar, squadron operations facility, and other facilities and utilities to support aircraft operations. Deliveries began in June 2013 and are to continued through December 2014.

=== Historical use ===
- No. 5 Squadron IAF – Jaguar IS/IB
- No. 14 Squadron IAF – Jaguar IS/IB
- No. 23 Squadron IAF – MiG-21 bis
- No. 24 Squadron IAF – MiG-21 bis

The Garud Commando Force of the Indian Air Force are trained at this base.

== Civil Enclave ==
The Ministry of Civil Aviation proposed the idea of a civil enclave at Hindon, built and operated by the AAI, because slot constraints at the Indira Gandhi International Airport prevented the operation of flights under the government's Regional Connectivity Scheme called UDAN. The Indian Air Force permitted the Civil Aviation ministry to use the air base for civil operations in August 2017. Since the government has an agreement with the Delhi International Airport Limited (DIAL), the operators of Delhi airport, prohibiting operations of another airport within a radius of 150 kilometres from Delhi airport, the MoCA negotiated with DIAL for permissions. DIAL gave approval in September 2017 for temporary civil operations from Hindon. When DIAL's on-going expansion of Delhi Airport is completed around September 2022, all UDAN operations would revert to Delhi Airport. The Uttar Pradesh government gave its approval for the project in March 2018.

The enclave is built on 7.5 acres at Sikandarpur village in Sahibabad, adjacent the airbase. The terminal has a capacity of serving 300 passengers an hour. 45.2 crores is being used to build the new civil terminal. Air traffic control will be provided by the Indian Air Force. It was inaugurated by prime minister Narendra Modi on 8 March 2019.

== See also ==
- Indian Air Force
- Ambala Air Force Station
- Sirsa Air Force Station
- Hisar Military Station
- Hisar Airport
- Karnal Airport
