= No. 41 Squadron IAF =

No. 41 Squadron IAF Otters
- Crest of The No. 41 Squadron IAF "Otters"
- Active: 1 March 1958- Present
- Country: Republic of India
- Allegiance: Indian Armed Forces
- Branch: Indian Air Force
- Role: Transport
- Garrison/HQ: AFS Palam; AFS Gauhati
- Nickname: "Otters"
- Mottos: Samay Par Sahayta; Help on time

Aircraft flown
- Transport: HS-748, Dornier 228

No. 41 Squadron IAF nicknamed as Otters has two detachments located at Palam under Western Air Command and at Gauhati under Eastern Air Command. The Squadron participates in operations involving air, land and airdrop of troops, equipment, supplies, and support or augment special operations forces, when appropriate.

== History ==
The No. 41 Squadron were raised in 1958 at Jodhpur and moved to the present location. During the conflict with Pakistan in 1965, the squadron flew a total of 614 Op missions in support of front-line troops.

The otters were phased out in 1984, the squadron became the first unit to induct, Dornier aircraft into the IAF inventory. Avro aircraft joined the squadron in 1996, making it only IAF unit to have both light and medium transport aircraft on its strength.

=== Lineage ===
- Constituted as No. 41 Squadron (Otters) on 1 March 1958
- Dornier 228 Aircraft was inducted on 9 November 2020

=== Assignments ===
- Indo-Pakistani War of 1965
- Indo-Pakistani War of 1971

=== Aircraft ===
- DHC-3 Otter
- Do 228
- HS-748
- Dornier 228

== Current Inventory ==
- HS-748
- Dornier 228
