= No. 220 Squadron IAF =

No. 220 Squadron Desert Tigers
- Insignia of The No. 220 Squadron IAF "Desert Tigers"
- Active: 23 December 1957 — July 2005; 1 September 2011 — Present
- Country: Republic of India
- Allegiance: Indian Armed Forces
- Branch: Indian Air Force
- Role: Close Air Support; Air Defence
- Garrison/HQ: Halwara AFS
- Nickname: "Desert Tigers"
- Mottos: Shauryam Tejo Dhritih; Valour, Energy and Firmness

Aircraft flown
- Fighter: Sukhoi Su-30MKI

No. 220 Squadron IAF nicknamed as Desert Tigers is a fighter squadron and is equipped with Su-30 MKIs and based at Halwara Air Force Station.

== History ==
From its birth until just short of the Indo-Pak war of 1965, the role of the squadron was Operational Conversion onto Vampire aircraft of the freshly commissioned pilots. The squadron, later re-equipped with the Indigenous HF-24 Marut in April 1969 and flew the Marut in the 1971 Indo-Pak War. In June 1981, the squadron converted onto the MiG-23BN., It was raised at IAF Station Jodhpur and in year 1997 It moved to IAF Station Halwara.

IAF had disbanded the 220 Squadron in June 2005 because of very old aircraft, but resurrected that with the induction of the SU 30 MKIs on 25 September 2012. They received the President's standards at Halwara AFS on 20 September 2013.

=== Assignments ===
- Indo-Pakistani War of 1965
- Indo-Pakistani War of 1971

== Aircraft ==
Aircraft types operated by 220 Squadron
Aircraft type	From	To	Air base
de Havilland Vampire FB.52	9 January 1963	1 May 2006	AFS Palam
HF-24 Marut	April 1969	June 1981	AFS Palam
MiG-23 BN	June 1981	1997	AFS Palam
MiG-23 BN	1997	July 2005	AFS Halwara
Su-30 MKI	1 September 2011	Present	AFS Halwara
