= No. 152 Helicopter Unit, IAF =

No. 115 Helicopter Unit
- Active: 14 September 1988 – present
- Country: Republic of India
- Branch: Indian Air Force
- Garrison/HQ: Sarsawa AFS
- Nickname: "Mighty Armours"
- Mottos: Apatsu Mitram; A friend in time of need

Aircraft flown
- Attack: Mil Mi-17

No. 152 Helicopter Unit (Mighty Armours) is a helicopter unit equipped with the Mil Mi-17 and based at Sarsawa Air Force Station.

== History ==
=== Assignments ===
- Operation Safed Sagar

=== Aircraft ===
- Mil Mi-17
- Mil Mi-17 V5

=== Awards ===
- Flt Lt Subramaniam Muhilan, posthumously awarded the Vayu Sena Medal (galantry) in 1999 kargil conflict.
- Sqn Ldr Rajiv Pundir, posthumously awarded the Vayu Sena Medal (galantry) in 1999 kargil conflict.
- Flt Sgt P V N R Prasad, posthumously awarded the Vayu Sena Medal (galantry) in 1999 kargil conflict.
- Sgt Raj Kishore Sahu, posthumously awarded the Vayu Sena Medal (galantry) in 1999 kargil conflict.
