= No. 153 Helicopter Unit, IAF =

No. 153 Helicopter Unit
- Active: 1 November 1988 – present
- Country: Republic of India
- Branch: Indian Air Force
- Garrison/HQ: Udhampur AFS
- Nickname(s): "Daring Dragons"
- Motto(s): Apatsu Mitram; A friend in time of need

Aircraft flown
- Transport: Mil Mi-17

No. 153 Helicopter Unit (Daring Dragons) is equipped with Mil Mi-17 helicopters and is based at Udhampur Air Force Station.

== History ==
=== Assignments ===
During the Kargil War, the unit participated in several operations, including Operation Meghdoot, Operation Pawan, Operation Rakshak, Operation Blizzard, Operation Baruab, Operation Sarpvinash, Operation Rahat, and Operation Safed Sagar. The unit also had the first female aviator in the IAF, Gunjan Saxena.

=== Aircraft ===
- Mil Mi-17
