= No. 223 Squadron IAF =

No. 223 Squadron Tridents
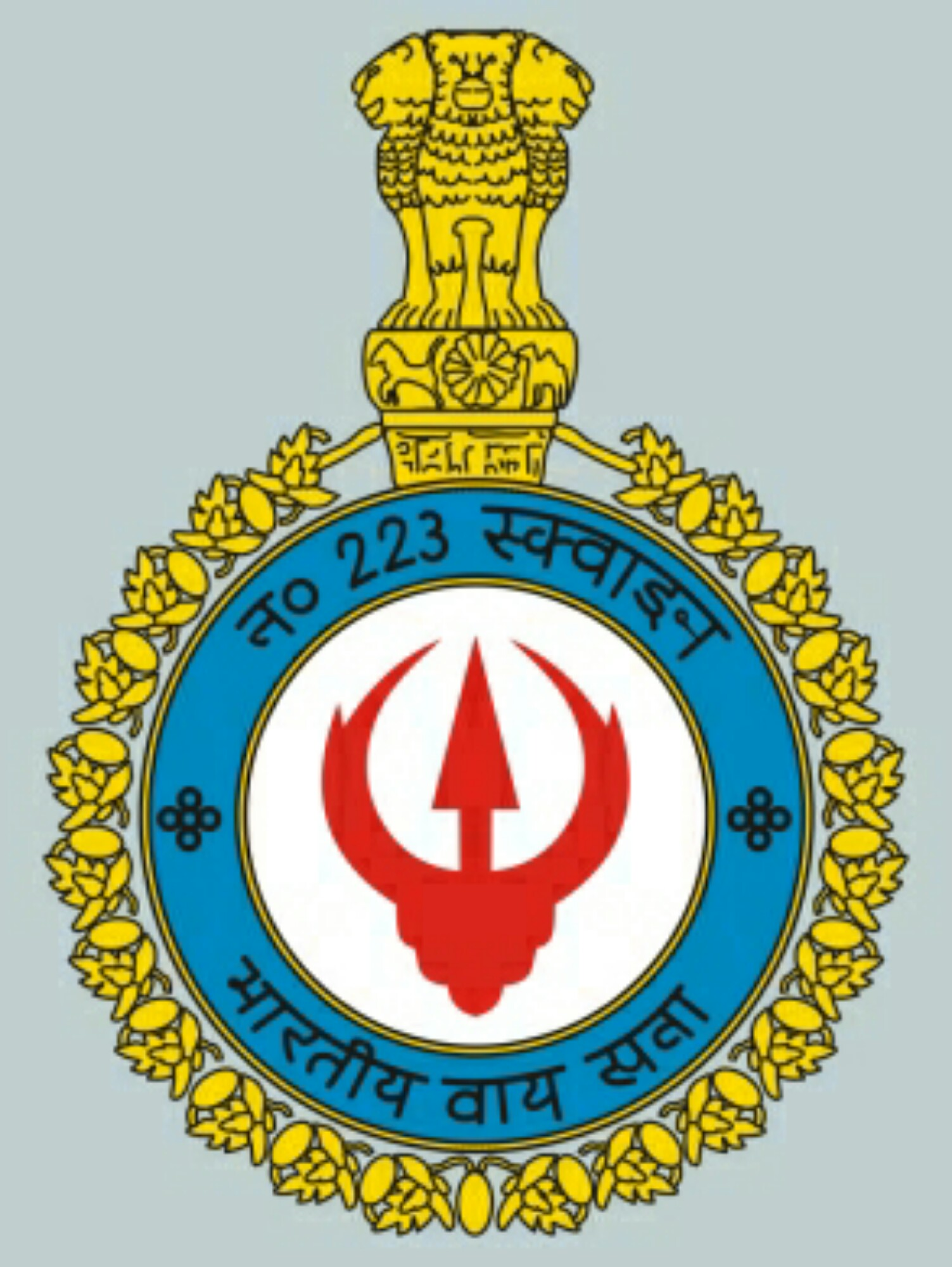
- Badge of No. 223 Squadron IAF "Tridents"
- Active: 10 May 1982 — July 1989; February 1990 — Present
- Country: Republic of India
- Allegiance: Indian Armed Forces
- Branch: Indian Air Force
- Role: Fighter
- Garrison/HQ: AFS Srinagar
- Nickname: "The Tridents"
- Mottos: विजयास्त्र अमोघास्त्र; Weapon for Victory

Aircraft flown
- Fighter: Mig-29UPG
- Transport: Mil Mi-17 helicopters

No. 223 Squadron also known as Tridents is a fighter squadron and is equipped with MiG-29UPG and based at Srinagar AFS.

== History ==
223 Squadron IAF was formed on 10 May 1982. It was the first Squadron in the IAF to be equipped with MiG-23 MF. The Squadron had the unique distinction of operating MiG-23s from Leh airport one of the highest airfields a fighter has ever operated from. The Squadron was christened The Swing Wing Interceptors in accordance with the aircraft it operated then.

In May 1989, the phasing out of MiG-23s started. Induction of the MiG-29s commenced in early 1990 and within a few months the Squadron had its full complement of aircraft and was fully operational. Since the swing wing was no more applicable the Squadron changed its nickname to Tridents.

The squadron's crest shows the striking end of "Trident". As per Indian history, this three pronged weapon, is Lord Shiva's powerful weapon. He is also known as the God of destruction.

The squadron was moved to Srinagar after the decommissioning of No. 51 Squadron.

== Aircraft ==
Aircraft types operated by 223 Squadron
Aircraft type	From	To	Air base
MiG-23 MF	10 May 1982	July 1989	AFS Adampur
MiG-29 UPG	February 1990	July 2023	AFS Adampur
MiG-29 UPG	August 2023	Present	AFS Srinagar
