= Jammu Airport =

Airport serving Jammu, Jammu and Kashmir, India

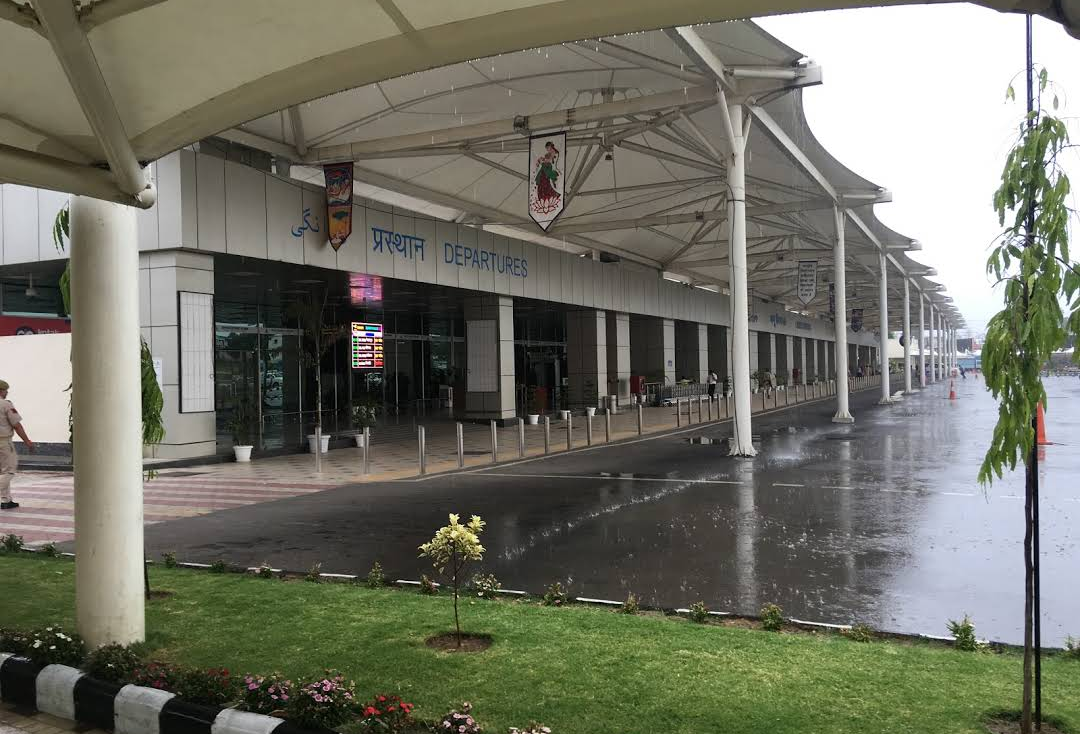
- IATA: IXJ; ICAO: VIJU

Summary
- Airport type: Public/Military
- Owner: Indian Air Force
- Operator: Airports Authority of India
- Serves: Jammu
- Location: Jammu, Jammu and Kashmir, India
- Time zone: Indian Standard Time (+5:30)
- Elevation AMSL: 314 m (1,030 ft)
- Coordinates: 32°41′21″N 074°50′15″E
- Website: Jammu Airport

Map
- Location within Jammu and Kashmir Location within India

Runways
Direction	Length		Surface
Direction	m	ft	Surface
18/36	2,438	8,000	Asphalt

Statistics (April 2025 - March 2026)
- Passengers: 13,83,717 (▼14.3%)
- Aircraft movements: 11,776 (▼12.9%)
- Cargo tonnage: 821.6 (▼22.1%)
- Source: AAI

Jammu Airport, officially known as Jammu Civil Enclave (IATA: IXJ, ICAO: VIJU), is a domestic airport serving Jammu in the Indian union territory of Jammu and Kashmir. It operates as a civil enclave alongside the Jammu Air Force Station operated by the Indian Air Force. The airport is located 8 km (5.0 mi) from the city centre and is located close to the India–Pakistan border. There is an air force training school based at the airport.

== History ==
The Jammu Air Force Station was established as the base of the No.1 Wing of the Indian Air Force on 10 March 1948. Though the detachment was soon moved to Srinagar, it was based out of Jammu during the winters till 1950. Thereafter, a small detachment of the wing was maintained at the base. In 1963, the No.23 Wing was raised at the base. The air force training school, based at the airport, was opened in 1971. The airport is owned by the Indian Air Force, and the Airports Authority of India established a civilian enclave at the airport in 1985. The airport underwent modernisation and expansion works in the late 2010s. The airport was targeted by Pakistani drone attacks during the 2025 India–Pakistan conflict, and the civilian operations were suspended for a few days in May 2025.

== Location ==
The airport is located 8 km (5.0 mi) from the city centre, along Ranbir Singh Pora road. It serves as a strategic base for the Indian Air Force as it is located close to the India–Pakistan border.

== Infrastructure ==
The airport has a single 2,042 m (6,699 ft) long asphalt runway, equipped with CAT I instrument landing system and Precision approach path indicator. The runway was extended by 1,300 ft (400 m), and was equipped with a new approach light system, and flashing lights in 2021. With the upgradation of the runway, the airport became capable of handling night operations.The airport apron can accommodate three narrow body aircraft.

The 6,500 m^{2} (70,000 sq ft) domestic passenger terminal can handle 360 passengers simultaneously. It has 14 check-in counters and two boarding gates. There are other stores, food stalls, a restaurant, a souvenir store and an information desk for pilgrims travelling to the Vaishno Devi temple in the terminal. In September 2021, the aviation minister announced that a new terminal spread across 45,000 m^{2} (480,000 sq ft) would be built at a cost of ₹7 (7.3¢ US). There is a car park with 80 spaces associated with the airport.

== Airlines and destinations ==
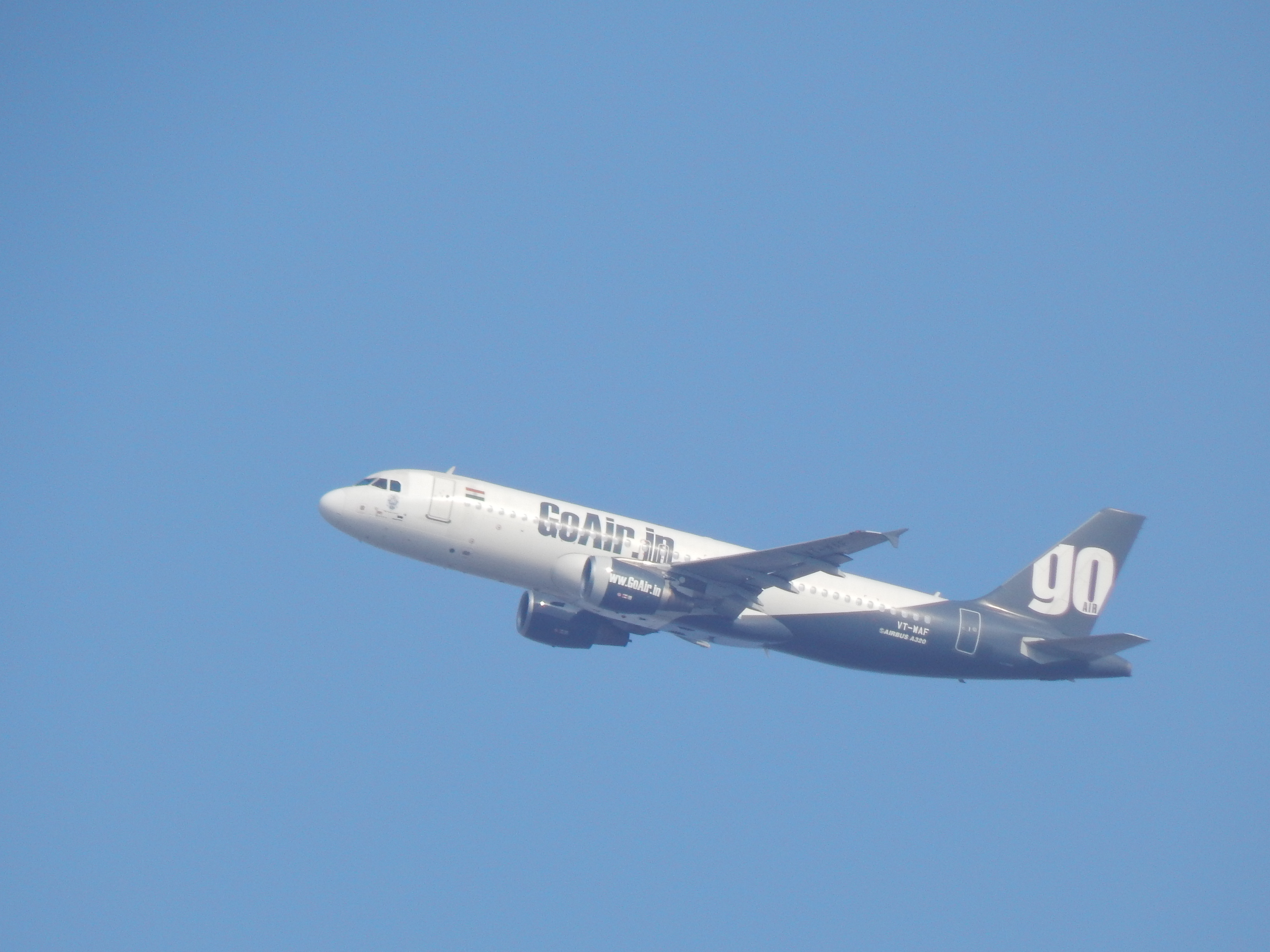
An aircraft at the airport

Airlines	Destinations
Air India	Delhi, Leh, Srinagar
Air India Express	Chennai, Delhi, Ghaziabad, Srinagar
Alliance Air	Delhi
IndiGo	Ahmedabad, Bengaluru, Delhi, Hyderabad, Indore, Kolkata, Leh, Navi Mumbai, Noida, Srinagar,
SpiceJet	Delhi, Srinagar

== Incidents and accidents ==
- On 9 January 2017, Air India 821, a Airbus A320-200, on a scheduled flight from Delhi, overshot the runway on landing, and came to a stop on soft ground, about 8 m (26 ft) from the edge of the runway. Four of the eight tyres of the main landing gear burst during the rollout and smoke emanated from the rear cabin. All 143 passengers were evacuated with no injuries. The investigation revealed that the incident was caused by the late touchdown and reduced deceleration rate due to improper application of the brakes.
- On 27 June 2021, there were twin blasts at the air force station, which took place within five minutes of each other. The first blast took place at 1:37 am IST, and damaged the roof of a building. The second blast took place on an empty lot outside the airport. The incident was suspected to be a terrorist attack, and injured two Indian Army personnel.
- On 10 April 2025, a IAI Heron drone of the Indian Army crash landed at the airport at 2:45 pm IST while returning from a reconnaissance mission. The incident occurred after loss of control of the aircraft while landing, and the aircraft crashed into a tower at the airport, injuring a Defence Security Corps personnel.

== See also ==
- List of busiest airports in India
