= No. 221 Squadron IAF =

No. 221 Squadron Valiants
- Insignia of The No. 221 Squadron IAF "Valiants"
- Active: 14 February 1963 — February 1979; February 1982 — April 2009; 24 April 2017 — Present
- Country: Republic of India
- Allegiance: Indian Armed Forces
- Branch: Indian Air Force
- Garrison/HQ: Halwara AFS
- Nickname: "Valiants"
- Decorations: President's Standard and Colour

Aircraft flown
- Attack: Su-30 MKI

No. 221 Squadron nicknamed as Valiants is an Indian Air Force fighter squadron and is equipped with Su-30MKI and based at Halwara Air Force Station.

== History ==
The squadron was established as an offensive fighter squadron on 14 February 1963 at Barrackpore. The first commanding officer was Squadron Leader N Chatrath. The squadron was subsequently equipped with Supermarine Spitfire, de Havilland Vampire and Su-7. The squadron has changed many based in the 54 years since its establishment. The Su-7 aircraft saw action in the Indo-Pakistani War of 1971 over Bangladesh. It also participated in the Kargil war with the Mig-23, which were retired in 2009. On 24 April 2017, Su30-MKI aircraft was inducted into the squadron with Wing Commander HS Luthra as the commanding officer. Numerous pilots from the squadron have been decorated with gallantry awards over many years of its operation.

=== Assignments ===
- Indo-Pakistani War of 1971
- Kargil War

=== Aircraft ===
Aircraft types operated by 221 Squadron
Aircraft type	From	To	Air base
Supermarine Spitfire	May 1963	January 1968	AFS Barrackpore
de Havilland Vampire FB.52	May 1963	January 1968	AFS Barrackpore
Su-7	February 1968	February 1979	AFS Barrackpore
MiG-23 BN	February 1982	April 2009	AFS Halwara
Su-30K	21 February 2007		AFS Halwara
Su-30 MKI	24 April 2017	Present	AFS Halwara
