= No. 129 Helicopter Unit, IAF =

No. 129 Helicopter Unit
- Active: 1 July 1987 – present
- Country: Republic of India
- Branch: Indian Air Force
- Role: Logistical support, airlift
- Size: Helicopter unit
- Garrison/HQ: Hindon Air Force Station
- Nickname: "Nubra Warriors"
- Motto: Never Give in

Aircraft flown
- Transport: Mil Mi-17

No. 129 Helicopter Unit (Nubra Warriors) is a helicopter unit equipped with Mil Mi-17s and based at Hindon Air Force Station.

== History ==
The sanction for the formation of the 129 Helicopter Unit was accorded in March 1987. Accordingly, the unit was raised at Hindon Air Force Station in July 1987.

=== Assignments ===
The unit when formed was assigned with various op and peacetime roles which included special heliborne operations, VVIP/VIP communication, courier flights for HP government and flies past on ceremonial occasions like Republic Day, Independence Day, and ir Force Day etc. they have the exclusive honour of colour trooping the National Flag on all these occasions.

- Operation Pawan, the Battle for Jaffna in Sri Lanka during October 1987.
- Operation Meghdoot, the operation to take the high ground on the Siachen Glacier in 1985.
- Operation Safed Sagar, the operation launched by iaf in 1999 Kargil conflict with a collaboration of *No. 152 Helicopter Unit.

=== Aircraft ===
- Mil Mi-17
