= No. 130 Helicopter Unit, IAF =

No. 115 Helicopter Unit
- Active: 15 February 1988 – present
- Country: Republic of India
- Branch: Indian Air Force
- Garrison/HQ: Leh AFS
- Nickname: "Condors"
- Mottos: ? We Support Life

Aircraft flown
- Attack: Mil Mi-17

No. 130 Helicopter Unit (Condors) is a Helicopter Unit and is equipped with Mil Mi-17 and based at Leh Air Force Station.

== History ==
=== Assignments ===
- Kargil War

=== Aircraft ===
- Mi-17 1V
