= No. 14 Squadron IAF =

No. 14 Squadron The Bulls
- Insignia of The No. 14 Squadron IAF "The Bulls"
- Active: 15 August 1951 - Present
- Country: Republic of India
- Allegiance: Indian Armed Forces
- Branch: Indian Air Force
- Role: Interdiction
- Garrison/HQ: Ambala AFS
- Nickname: "The Bulls"
- Mottos: "बलं जयय" (Balam Jayay); Strength will Conquer

Aircraft flown
- Attack: SEPECAT Jaguar IS

No. 14 Squadron nicknamed The Bulls is a ground attack unit, operating out of AFS Ambala. The squadron currently operates SEPECAT Jaguar IS and IBs, operational since March 1981.

== History ==
In 1951, No. 14 Squadron was raised as part of a crash expansion plan by the Indian Air Force to counter emerging threats. This expansion was accomplished within just eight weeks, despite major constraints in aircraft availability and trained manpower.

Hunters of No. 14 Squadron battled with Sabres of the PAF in the Indo-Pakistani War of 1965. No. 14 Squadron was the first to be equipped with the state of the art Jaguar aircraft in 1979.

This squadron spent considerable part of their existence in Eastern India, first at Barrackpore Air Force Station, in the Calcutta suburbs and later at Kalaikunda, south-west of Calcutta. It was from this airbase they saw action, namely led by Flight Lieutenant Alfred Tyrone Cooke and his subordinate Subodh Chandra Mamgain briefly during September 1965 and in December 1971. No. 14 Squadron had the unusual opportunity of being deployed at the captured PAF airbase of Jessore during the final stages of the Bangladesh war.

== Aircraft ==
Aircraft types operated by the squadron

Aircraft type	From	To	Air base
Supermarine Spitfire VIII	September 1951	October 1957	
de Havilland Vampire FB52	October 1957	August 1959	
Hawker Hunter Mk 56	November 1959	January 1979	AFS Kalaikunda
SEPECAT Jaguar IS	August 1979	Present	AFS Ambala
