= No. 25 Squadron IAF =

No. 25 Squadron IAF Himalayan Eagles
- Crest of No. 25 Squadron IAF "Eagles"
- Active: 1 March 1963- Present
- Country: Republic of India
- Allegiance: Indian Armed Forces
- Branch: Indian Air Force
- Role: Transport
- Garrison/HQ: AFS Vadodara
- Nickname: "Himalayan Eagles"
- Mottos: Satvadeena hi Sidhvayah; In power lies victory

Aircraft flown
- Transport: Antonov AN-32

No. 25 Squadron IAF nicknamed as Himalayan Eagles is a unit of the Indian Air Force assigned to South Western Air Command. The Squadron participates in operations involving air, land and airdrop of troops, equipment, supplies, and support or augment special operations forces, when appropriate.

== History ==
The No. 25 Squadron were raised in 1963 at Chandigarh and moved to the present location. 25 Squadron also played a vital role in the Indo-Pak conflicts of 1965 and 1971, Operation Parakram, Operation Vijay and Kargil Operation in 1999.

=== Lineage ===
- Constituted as No. 25 Squadron (Himalayan Eagles) on 1 March 1963

=== Assignments ===
- Indo-Pakistani War of 1965
- Indo-Pakistani War of 1971

=== Aircraft ===
- An-12
- AN-32
- IL-76
