= Sarsawa Air Force Station =

Airforce base in India

- IATA: SWN; ICAO: VISP

Summary
- Airport type: Military, Civil
- Owner/Operator: Indian Air Force (airstrip)
- Serves: Saharanpur
- Elevation AMSL: 891 ft (272 m)
- Coordinates: 29°59′39″N 77°25′27″E

Map
- Location of the airport in Uttar Pradesh VISP (India)

Runways
Direction	Length		Surface
Direction	ft	m	Surface
09/27	9,000 x 150	2,743 x 46	Concrete

Sarsawa Air Force Station is located approximately 12 km (7.5 mi) from Saharanpur City, Uttar Pradesh, India and is approximately 17 km (11 mi) from Yamunanagar, Haryana, India. It belongs to the Western Air Command. Though the sole user of this airbase is the Indian Air Force, it does handle civilian flights on a regular basis for VIP transport to Yamunanagar and Saharanpur

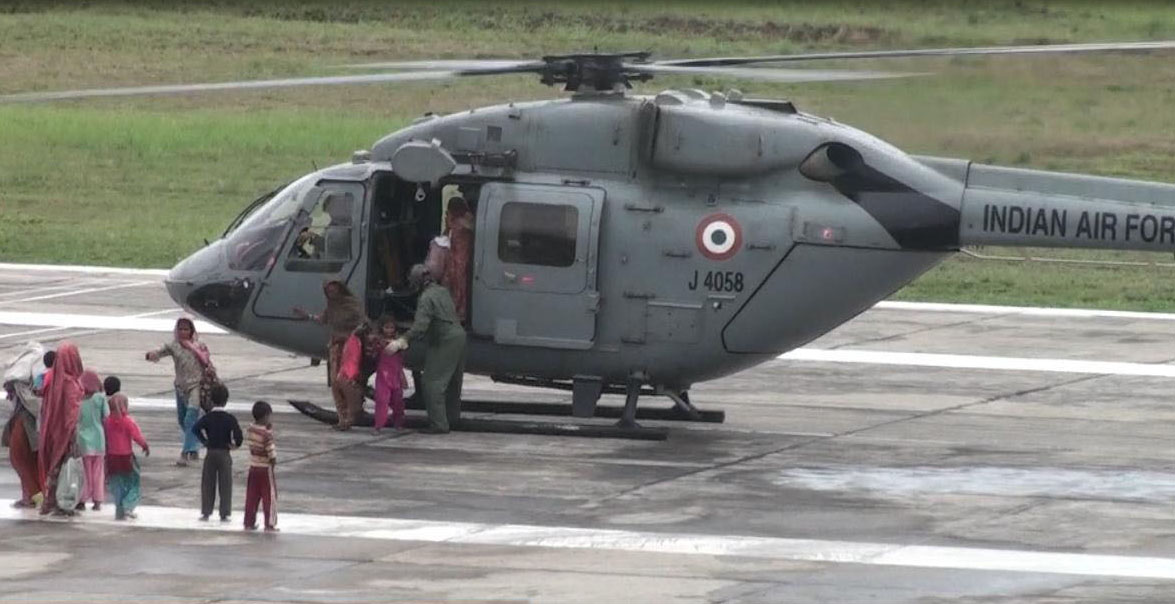
A HAL Dhruv during Operation Rahat

The Air force station is also headquarters for the Special Group.

According to reports, the air base is being upgraded for the joint deployment of MQ-9B drones of Indian Army and Indian Air Force along with Gorakhpur AFS.
