= Halwara Air Force Station =

- IATA: HWR; ICAO: VIHX

Summary
- Airport type: Public / Military
- Operator: Airports Authority of India, Indian Air Force
- Serves: Ludhiana
- Location: Halwara, Punjab, India
- Elevation AMSL: 790 ft (240 m)
- Coordinates: 30°44′55″N 75°37′47″E
- Interactive map of Halwara Air Force Station

Runways
Direction	Length		Surface
Direction	ft	m	Surface
13/31	10,629	3,240	Asphalt

Halwara Air Force Station is an Indian Air Force (IAF) base near Halwara town in Punjab, India. It is one of the oldest frontline airbases of the IAF and was actively involved in both, 1965 and 1971 Indo-Pak conflicts because of its strategic location. It is home to the 220 Squadron known as "Desert Tigers" and 221 Squadron known as "Valiants" flying the Sukhoi Su-30MKI.

The state government signed a Memorandum of understanding (MoU) with the Airports Authority of India (AAI) in December 2018 to construct a civil enclave at the air base. It will be spread over 135.5 acres and is expected to ready in three years.

== History ==
The airfield was built in 1942 by the Royal Air Force. Halwara was used as an allied Air Force staging base during World War II and was abandoned after the war. Halwara was reactivated under the Indian Air Force on 16 March 1950, and is one of the oldest frontline airbases of the IAF.

The base was home to two Spitfire squadrons in the early 1950s. The de Havilland Vampire, the first jet aircraft of the IAF, was introduced to the base in 1954. The 1800 metre runway was extended to its present length in 1963. Due to its strategic location, Halwara was actively involved in both 1965 and 1971 Indo-Pak wars. The base housed squadrons of MIG 23 BN for three decades until March 2009 when they were phased out. In September 2012, Halwara inducted its first squadron of the Sukhoi Su-30MKI becoming the first air base in the Western Air Command to operate the aircraft.

== Ludhiana International Airport ==
In December 2018, the Government of Punjab a Memorandum of Understanding (MoU) with the AAI in December 2018 to construct a civil enclave at the air force base. A Joint Venture Company (JVC), formed with the majority of 51% stake of AAI and 49% stake of the State Government through the Greater Ludhiana Development Authority (GLADA), will execute the project. The Government of Punjab will provide 135.54 acres of land by way of its equity in the project, while AAI will bear the costs of developing the airport. The first phase is expected to be completed within three years and will allow for operations of Code 4C type of aircraft. It will be built at a cost of ₹ 46.91 crore and the total covered area of the interim building will be 2,000 sq.m. It will have a seating capacity for 300 passengers and a public parking space, which will be able to accommodate 75 cars.

The airport will be accessed with a direct link road to the airport with the upcoming Delhi-Amritsar-Katra Expressway. It is currently being put under proposal by the National Highways Authority of India (NHAI).

As of January 2022, the terminal's construction has been started from December 2021, and the foundation stone was laid by Dr. Amar Singh on 5 January 2022. The terminal is being constructed by Himachal Pradesh firm Synergy Thrislington of Solan. The terminal is expected to be completed by 30 June 2022.

On 29 December 2023 the Chief Minister expressed expectations that the initiation of flights from Halwara terminal on 15 February 2024 would contribute significantly to the economic and industrial activities in the region. He conveyed a strong commitment from the government towards comprehensive development and the prosperity of the state, with a particular emphasis on the anticipated impact of the Halwara airport operations.
