= Barrackpore Air Force Station =

Barrackpore Air Force Station
- IATA: none; ICAO: VEBR

Summary
- Airport type: Military
- Operator: Indian Air Force
- Location: Barrackpore, Kolkata
- Elevation AMSL: 18 ft / 5 m
- Coordinates: 22°46′55″N 088°21′33″E

Map
- Location in West Bengal Barrackpore; Air Force Station (India)

Runways
Direction	Length		Surface
Direction	ft	m	Surface
02/20	6,250	1,893	Asphalt

Barrackpore Air Force Station is an Indian Air Force base located at Barrackpore, Kolkata in the state of West Bengal, India. Barrackpore is one of the oldest stations in the IAF, operating transport units. One of the Mi-17 squadrons is based here.

== History ==
During World War II, the airfield was used as a reconnaissance airfield by the United States Army Air Forces Tenth Air Force, which flew unarmed P-38 Lightning aircraft from the station, equipped with several mapping cameras to gather intelligence on Japanese forces in occupied Burma. Barrackpore was also home to several Spitfire Squadrons in the early 1950s.

In 1963 No. 11 Squadron IAF was located at Barrackpore flying Douglas Dakotas. That year two Dakotas were sent to Bandung (Husein) in Indonesia to carry air and ground crew to pick up Indonesian Air Force de Havilland Vampire fighters which were to be transferred to the IAF.

Several Spitfire airframes were salvaged from Barrackpore in the 1970s and 1980s and are currently restored to flying status in the west.

Its ancillary units are 5 Tettra and 3 Tettra and Flying unit is 157 HU.
