= Udhampur Air Force Station =

- IATA: none; ICAO: VIUM

Summary
- Airport type: Military
- Operator: Indian Air Force
- Serves: Udhampur, Jammu and Kashmir
- Location: Udhampur, Jammu and Kashmir
- Elevation AMSL: 2,066 ft (630 m)
- Coordinates: 32°54′07″N 075°09′22″E

Map
- Location within Jammu and Kashmir Location within India

Runways
Direction	Length		Surface
Direction	m	ft	Surface
18/36	2,743	9,000	Concrete
- Source: Indian AIP

Udhampur Air Force Station (ICAO: VIUM) of the Indian Air Force (IAF) is located in Udhampur in Jammu and Kashmir, India, a region disputed between India and Pakistan. The location is also the headquarters of Indian Army's Northern Command.

== History ==
During the 2025 India–Pakistan conflict, the base was reportedly targeted by Pakistan on 10 May 2025. The Indian military confirmed one soldier, a medical assistant, died at the base during the attack.

== Facilities ==
The airport is situated at an elevation of 2,066 ft/630 m above mean sea level. It has one runway with concrete surfaces: 18/36 measuring 9000 by 148 feet (2,743 x 45 m).

It is home to No. 153 Helicopter Unit of the Indian Air Force. While assigned to the unit, Gunjan Saxena became the first female officer of the IAF to fly in the Kargil War.

== Civil aviation enclave ==
A civil aviation enclave is being developed on this Airforce Stations in two phases, phase-1 entailing civil flight operations from existing AFS facilities on 2,200 square metres land for new civil aviation terminal which will handle 150 passengers and ATR 72 or Q400 smaller aircraft, and phase-2 will entail a new civil aviation enclave outside the AFS by acquiring 27.6 acres land for new terminal building, apron and taxiway capable of handling Airbus A321 type larger aircraft. AAI had compled the site feasibility study in 2025.

== See also ==
- List of airports in India
