= Srinagar Airport =

International Airport in Srinagar, Jammu and Kashmir, India

Srinagar International Airport
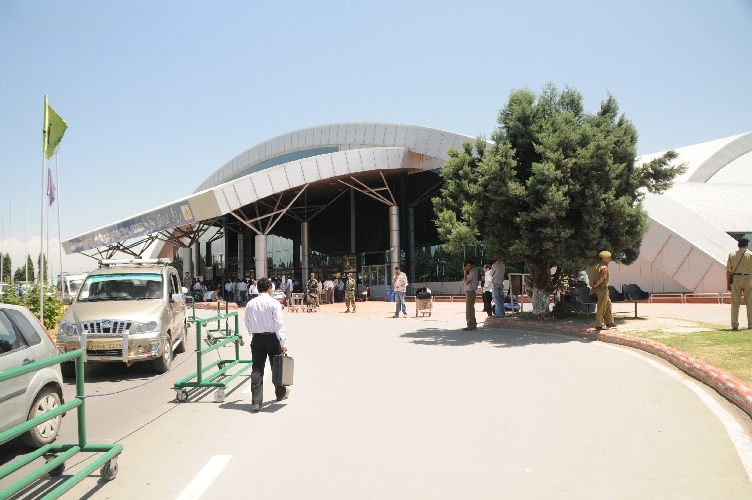
- Entrance of the airport
- IATA: SXR; ICAO: VISR

Summary
- Airport type: Military/public
- Owner: Indian Air Force
- Operator: Airports Authority of India
- Serves: Srinagar
- Location: Budgam, Jammu and Kashmir, India
- Opened: 1979; 47 years ago
- Time zone: IST (UTC+05:30)
- Elevation AMSL: 1,655 m (5,430 ft)
- Coordinates: 33°59′13.7″N 074°46′27.3″E
- Website: Srinagar Airport

Map
- Location in Budgam, Jammu and Kashmir SXR (India)

Runways
Direction	Length		Surface
Direction	m	ft	Surface
13/31	3,685	12,090	Asphalt

Statistics (April 2025 – March 2026)
- Passengers: 33,72,163 (▼24.6%)
- Aircraft movements: 21,186 (▼25.6%)
- Cargo tonnage: 9,628.7 (▼2.7%)
- Source: AAI

Srinagar International Airport (IATA: SXR, ICAO: VISR) (Note: Though the airport is officially known as Srinagar International Airport, and the proposed name change to Sheikh ul-Alam International Airport was not officially incorporated, the airport is also referred to by its proposed name of Sheikh ul-Alam International Airport.) is an international airport serving Srinagar, the summer capital of the Indian union territory of Jammu and Kashmir. It is located at Budgam, about 12 km (7.5 mi) south of Srinagar. It is owned by the Indian Air Force, and the Airports Authority of India operates a civil enclave at the airport, which was opened in 1979. It was designated as an international airport in 2005. It has an integrated domestic and international terminal with one asphalt runway.

In 2015, the Government of Jammu and Kashmir proposed to officially rename the airport as Sheikh ul-Alam Airport after Nund Rishi, a Kashmiri Sufi saint, who was known by the title of Sheikh ul-Alam. However, the name of the airport was not officially changed.

== History ==
Srinagar Airport in 1996

Srinagar airfield was established by the Indian Air Force, and during the Indo-Pakistani War of 1947, the airstrip was used for the airlift of Indian army troops deployed to prevent the capture of Srinagar by the Pakistan army. Although the airstrip was not well developed and lacked landing aids, it was used for airlift of troops successfully in October 1947. During the 1950s to 1970s, the airfield evolved into one of the forward attack bases of the Indian Air Force. On 7 September 1965, during the Indo-Pakistani War of 1965, the airport was attacked by the Pakistan Air Force, which damaged an Indian Air Force Douglas C-47 Skytrain and an Indian Airlines Douglas DC-3. As per Chicago Tribune, one Indian aircraft and a de Havilland Canada DHC-4 Caribou transport of the United Nations observers headquarters were damaged in the attack. Later, the airport, which housed various fighter squadrons of the Indian Air Force, served as a launchpad for combat air patrols and counter-air missions during the Indo-Pakistani wars in 1965 and 1971.

In 1979, the National Airports Authority of India established a civil enclave at the airport. The terminal was upgraded in February 1998 to be able to handle international Hajj flights which started operating from January 2002. During the Kargil War in 1999, civilian flights were stopped and the airport was taken over by the Indian Air Force.

In March 2005, the airport was granted international status by the Indian government. In 2015, the Government of Jammu and Kashmir proposed to rename the airport as Sheikh ul-Alam Airport after Nund Rishi, a Kashmiri Sufi saint, who was known by the title of Sheikh ul-Alam. However, the name of the airport was not officially changed. In 2020, the Bharatiya Janata Party proposed that the airport be named after Major Somnath Sharma, the first recipient of India's highest military decoration, Param Vir Chakra.

== Infrastructure ==
=== Runway ===
The airport has a single asphalt runway, designated as 13/31, with dimensions of 3,685 m × 46 m (12,090 ft × 151 ft). It is equipped with an instrument landing system since February 2011. In August 2018, a test flight was conducted for night landing by the Directorate General of Civil Aviation, and commercial night flying operations at the airport started on 19 March 2021.

=== Terminal ===
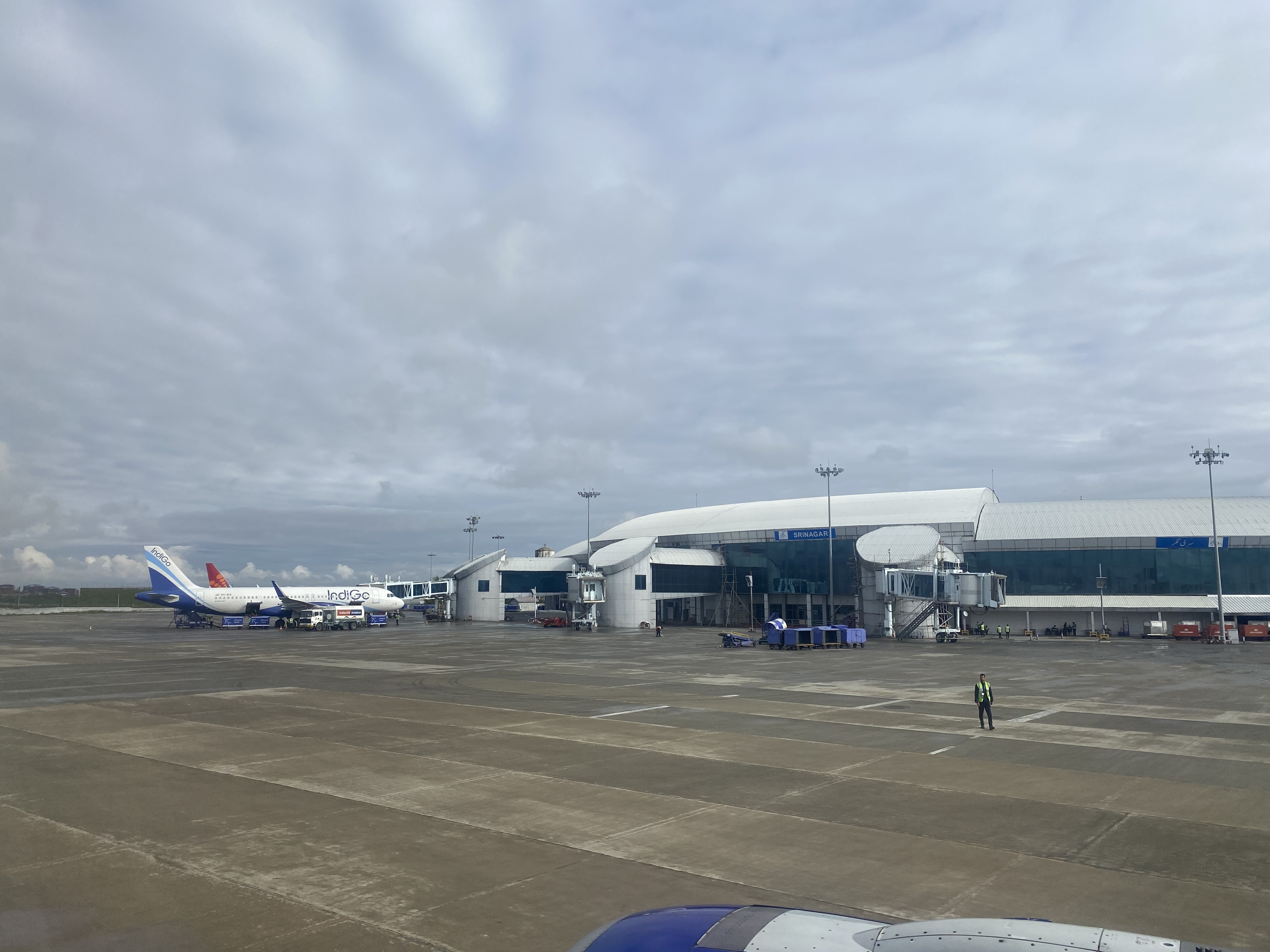
Terminal as viewed from the apron

The airport has an integrated passenger terminal for handling domestic and international passengers. Spread over an area of 19,700 m^{2} (212,000 sq ft), it has a capacity to handle 950 passengers at a time. The terminal is designed on the Himalayan theme and has a sloping roof to facilitate easier removal of snow. The terminal was constructed at a cost of ₹1.3 billion (US$13 million) as a part of an expansion project in the mid 2000s and was inaugurated on 14 February 2009. There are nine parking bays with five connected by jet bridges to the terminal.

In 2019, the authorities announced plans to construct a new airport terminal to handle only international flights with domestic flights operating from the older terminal. In September 2021, the aviation minister announced the expansion of the existing terminal to 63,000 m^{2} (680,000 sq ft) at a cost of ₹15 billion (US$160 million). Other amenities include a food court, food outlets, handicraft shops, ATMs, and currency exchanges.

== Airlines and destinations ==
Airlines	Destinations
Air India	Delhi, Jammu, Leh, Mumbai
Air India Express	Bengaluru, Delhi, Jammu
Akasa Air	Delhi, Mumbai-Shivaji
IndiGo	Ahmedabad, Amritsar, Bengaluru, Chandigarh, Delhi, Hyderabad, Jammu, Kolkata, Mumbai, Navi Mumbai, Noida
SpiceJet	Delhi, Jammu

== Ground transport ==
The airport is located about 12 km (7.5 mi) from Srinagar. The airport has a car park which can accommodate 250 vehicles. The government provides a paid bus service between the airport and the tourist reception center near Lal Chowk, while the Airports Authority of India operates a free bus service between the terminal and the airport entrance gate located about a 1 km (0.62 mi) away. The airport is also served by taxis and car rental agencies, which have their booths outside the terminal.

== See also ==
- Kashmir Valley
