= List of active Indian Air Force aircraft squadrons =

List of active flight squadrons of Indian Air Force

This is an organized list of all of the active aircraft squadrons that currently exist in the Indian Air Force. Squadrons might have changed names and designations many times over the years, so they are listed by their current designation. Expeditionary and provisional units are not listed.

The Indian Air Force’s squadron strength has evolved over time, shaped by regional conflicts, aircraft retirements, and procurement delays. A comprehensive historical analysis of this trajectory — including the origin and implications of the “42 squadron” benchmark — has been documented.

== Combat ==
Squadron Name	Insignia	Nickname	Command	Date First Activated	Base	Aircraft	Reference
No. 1 Squadron		Tigers	Central Air Command	1 April 1933	Maharajpur AFS, Madhya Pradesh	Mirage 2000	
No. 2 Squadron		Winged Arrows	Eastern Air Command	1 April 1941	Tezpur AFS, Assam	Su-30MKI	
No. 4 Squadron		Oorials	South Western Air Command	1 February 1942	Uttarlai AFS, Rajasthan	Su-30MKI	
No. 5 Squadron		Tuskers	Western Air Command	2 November 1948	Ambala AFS, Haryana	Jaguar	
No. 6 Squadron		Dragons	South Western Air Command	1 December 1942	Jamnagar AFS, Gujarat	Jaguar	
No. 7 Squadron		Battle Axes	Central Air Command	1 December 1942	Maharajpur AFS, Madhya Pradesh	Mirage 2000	
No. 8 Squadron		Eight Pursoots	Central Air Command	1 December 1942	Bareilly AFS, Uttar Pradesh	Su-30MKI	
No. 9 Squadron		Wolfpack	Central Air Command	4 January 1944	Maharajpur AFS, Madhya Pradesh	Mirage 2000	
No. 14 Squadron		Bulls	Western Air Command	15 August 1951	Ambala AFS, Haryana	Jaguar	
No. 15 Squadron		Flying Lancers	Western Air Command	20 August 1951	Sirsa AFS, Haryana	Su-30MKI	
No. 16 Squadron		Black Cobras	Central Air Command	1950	Gorakhpur AFS, Uttar Pradesh	Jaguar	
No. 17 Squadron		Golden Arrows	Western Air Command	1 October 1951	Ambala AFS, Haryana	Rafale	
No. 18 Squadron		Flying Bullets	South Western Air Command	15 April 1965	Naliya AFS, Gujarat	Tejas	
No. 20 Squadron		Lightnings	South Western Air Command	1 June 1956	Lohegaon AFS, Maharashtra	Su-30MKI	
No. 24 Squadron		Hawks	Central Air Command	19 February 1962	Bareilly AFS, Uttar Pradesh	Su-30MKI	
No. 27 Squadron		Flaming Arrows	Central Air Command	15 February 1957	Gorakhpur AFS, Uttar Pradesh	Jaguar	
No. 28 Squadron		First Supersonics	Western Air Command	23 March 1963	Adampur AFS, Punjab	MiG-29	
No. 30 Squadron		Rhinos	South Western Air Command	1 November 1969	Lohegaon AFS, Maharashtra	Su-30MKI	
No. 31 Squadron		Lions	South Western Air Command	1 September 1963	Jodhpur AFS, Rajasthan	Su-30MKI	
No. 45 Squadron		Flying Daggers	Southern Air Command	20 November 1959	Sulur AFS, Tamil Nadu	Tejas	
No. 47 Squadron		Black Archers	Western Air Command	18 December 1959	Adampur AFS, Punjab	MiG-29	
No. 101 Squadron		Falcons	Eastern Air Command	1 May 1949	Hasimara AFS, West Bengal	Rafale	
No. 102 Squadron		Trisonics	Eastern Air Command	25 August 1981	Chabua AFS, Assam	Su-30MKI	
No. 106 Squadron		Lynxes	Eastern Air Command	11 December 1959	Tezpur AFS, Assam	Su-30MKI	
No. 220 Squadron		Desert Tigers	Western Air Command	23 December 1957	Halwara AFS, Punjab	Su-30MKI	
No. 221 Squadron		Valiants	Western Air Command	14 February 1963	Halwara AFS, Punjab	Su-30MKI	
No. 222 Squadron		Tigersharks	Southern Air Command	15 September 1969	Thanjavur AFS, Tamil Nadu	Su-30MKI	
No. 223 Squadron		Tridents	Western Air Command	10 May 1982	Srinagar AFS, Jammu and Kashmir	MiG-29	
No. 224 Squadron		Warlords	South Western Air Command	4 October 1983	Jamnagar AFS, Gujarat	Jaguar	

== Transport ==
Squadron Name	Insignia	Nickname	Command	Date First Activated	Base	Aircraft	Reference
No. 11 Squadron		Charging Rhinos	South Western Air Command	15 November 1951	Makarpura AFS, Gujarat	Airbus C-295	
No. 12 Squadron		Yaks	Central Air Command	1 December 1945	Agra AFS, Uttar Pradesh	An-32	
N/A Flying Squadron			Central Air Command		Agra AFS, Uttar Pradesh	Airbus C-295	
No. 19 Squadron			Southern Air Command	24 May 1960	Port Blair AFS, Andaman and Nicobar	Do-228	
No. 25 Squadron		Himalayan Eagles	South Western Air Command	1 March 1963	Makarpura AFS, Gujarat	An-32	
No. 33 Squadron		Himalayan Geese	Southern Air Command	9 January 1963	Sulur AFS, Tamil Nadu	An-32	
No. 41 Squadron		Otters	Western Air Command	1 March 1958	Palam AFS, Delhi	HS 748; Do-228	
No. 43 Squadron		Ibex	Eastern Air Command	20 January 1958	Jorhat AFS, Assam	An-32	
No. 44 Squadron		Mighty Jets	Western Air Command	31 March 1961	Chandigarh AFS, Chandigarh	Il-76	
No. 48 Squadron		Camels	Western Air Command	15 November 1959	Chandigarh AFS, Chandigarh	An-32	
No. 49 Squadron		Paraspears	Eastern Air Command	2 February 1960	Jorhat AFS, Assam	An-32	
No. 59 Squadron		Hornbills	Eastern Air Command	14 February 1960	Guwahati AFS, Assam	Do-228	
No. 77 Squadron		Veiled Vipers	Western Air Command	5 February 2011	Hindon AFS, Delhi	C-130J	
No. 81 Squadron		Sky Lords	Western Air Command	1 September 2013	Hindon AFS, Delhi	C-17	
No. 87 Squadron		Raiding Raptors	Eastern Air Command	6 May 2016	Panagarh AFS, West Bengal	C-130J	

== Helicopter ==
Squadron Name	Insignia	Nickname	Command	Date First Activated	Base	Aircraft	Reference
No. 125 Helicopter Squadron		Gladiators	Western Air Command	31 December 1983	Pathankot AFS, Punjab	AH-64	
No. 137 Helcopter Squadron		Vulcans	Western Air Command	21 October 2019	Pathankot AFS, Punjab	AH-64	
No. 104 Helicopter Squadron		Firebirds	South Western Air Command	25 August 1992	Suratgarh AFS, Rajasthan	Mi-35	
No. 105 Helicopter Unit		Daring Eagles	Central Air Command	23 November 1959	Gorakhpur AFS, Uttar Pradesh	Mi-17	
No. 107 Helicopter Unit		Desert Hawks	South Western Air Command	1 January 1960	Jodhpur AFS, Rajasthan	Mi-17	
No. 109 Helicopter Unit		Knights	Southern Air Command	26 August 1961	Sulur AFS, Tamil Nadu	Mi-17	
No. 110 Helicopter Unit		Vanguards	Eastern Air Command	10 August 1963	Kumbhigram AFS, Assam	Mi-17	
No. 111 Helicopter Unit		Snow Tigers	Central Air Command	1 August 1963	Bareilly AFS, Uttar Pradesh	Dhruv	
No. 112 Helicopter Unit		Thoroughbreds	Training Command	1 August 1963	Yelahanka AFS, Karnataka	Mi-17	
No. 114 Helicopter Unit		Siachen Pioneers	Western Air Command	1 April 1964	Leh AFS, Ladakh	Cheetah	
No. 115 Helicopter Unit		Hovering Angels	Eastern Air Command	1 April 1967	Tezpur AFS, Assam	Dhruv	
No. 116 Helicopter Unit		Tankbusters	South Western Air Command	1 January 1970	Jodhpur AFS, Rajasthan	HAL Rudra	
No. 117 Helicopter Unit		Himalayan Dragons	Central Air Command	1 February 1971	Saraswa AFS, Uttar Pradesh	Dhruv	
No. 118 Helicopter Unit		Challengers	Eastern Air Command	22 November 1971	Guwahati AFS, Assam	Mi-17	
No. 119 Helicopter Unit		Stallions	South Western Air Command	3 March 1972	Jamnagar AFS, Gujarat	Mi-17	
No. 127 Helicopter Unit		First Ranas	Eastern Air Command	10 January 1985	Mohanbari AFS, Assam	Mi-17	
No. 128 Helicopter Unit		Siachen Tigers	Eastern Air Command	30 December 1985	Mohanbari AFS, Assam	Mi-17	
No. 129 Helicopter Unit		Nubra Warriors	Central Air Command	1 July 1987	Hindon AFS, Delhi	Mi-17	
No. 130 Helicopter Unit		Condors	Western Air Command	15 February 1988	Leh AFS, Ladakh	Mi-17	
No. 143 Helicopter Unit		Dhanush	South Western Air Command	1 June 2022	Jodhpur AFS, Rajasthan	Prachand	
No. 152 Helicopter Unit		Mighty Armours	Central Air Command	14 September 1988	Saraswa AFS, Uttar Pradesh	Mi-17	
No. 153 Helicopter Unit		Daring Dragons	Western Air Command	1 November 1988	Udhampur AFS, Jammu and Kashmir	Mi-17	
No. 154 Helicopter Unit		Snow Leopards	Western Air Command	8 March 2012	Srinagar AFS, Jammu and Kashmir	Mi-17	
No. 155 Helicopter Unit		Kirpans	South Western Air Command	14 January 2011	Suratgarh AFS, Rajasthan	Mi-17	
No. 156 Helicopter Unit		Armoured Kestrals	Eastern Air Command	23 January 2012	Bagdogra AFS, West Bengal	Mi-17	
No. 157 Helicopter Unit		Tarkshya	Eastern Air Command	9 April 2012	Barrackpore AFS, West Bengal	Mi-17	
No. 158 Helicopter Unit		Silver Falcions	South Western Air Command	10 December 2012	Phalodi AFS, Rajasthan	Mi-17	
No. 159 Helicopter Unit		Rudraksh	South Western Air Command	11 February 2013	Nagpur AFS, Maharashtra	Mi-17	
No. 121 Helicopter Flight		Sea Eagles	South Western Air Command	7 January 1973	Mumbai, Maharashtra	Mi-17	
No. 122 Helicopter Flight		Flying Dolphins	Southern Air Command	26 September 1981	Car Nicobar AFS, Andaman and Nicobar	Mi-17	
No. 126 Helicopter Flight		Featherweights	Western Air Command	15 May 1986	Chandigarh AFS, Chandigarh	CH-47	
No. 131 Helicopter Flight		Eagle Eyes	Southern Air Command	2 August 1974	Thanjavur AFS, Tamil Nadu	Cheetah; Chetak	
No. 132 Helicopter Flight		Hovering Hawks	Western Air Command	10 April 1986	Udhampur AFS, Jammu and Kashmir	Cheetah Chetak	

== Aerial Refueling ==
Squadron Name	Insignia	Nickname	Command	Date First Activated	Base	Aircraft	Reference
No. 78 Squadron		Valarous Mars	Central Air Command	16 December 2002	Agra AFS, Uttar Pradesh	Il-78MKI	

== Electronic warfare/Airborne early warning(AWS) ==
Squadron Name	Insignia	Nickname	Command	Date First Activated	Base	Aircraft	Reference
No. 50 Squadron		Adwitiya	Central Air Command	1 October 2008	Agra AFS, Uttar Pradesh	A-50	
No. 181 Flight		Hawks	Western Air Command	5 August 1978	Hindon AFS, Delhi	737 SIGNIT; 748-R	
No. 200 Squadron		Netra	Western Air Command	4 December 2014	Bathinda AFS, Punjab	ERJ-145SM AEW&C	

== Aerobatics display ==
Squadron Name	Insignia	Display Logo	Nickname	Command	Date First Activated	Base	Aircraft	Reference
No. 52 Squadron			Sharks / Suryakiran Aerobatics Team (SKAT)	Training Command	1 January 1986	Bidar AFS, Karnataka	Hawk Mark-132	
No. 151 Helicopter Unit			Sarangs	Southern Air Command	1 June 1989	Sulur AFS, Tamil Nadu	HAL Dhruv	

== Remotely piloted aircraft (RPA) ==
Squadron Name	Insignia	Nickname	Command	Date First Activated	Base	Aircraft	Reference
No. 3001 Squadron			Western Air Command	27 November 2000	Bathinda AFS, Punjab		
No. 3002 Squadron		Cats Eyes	South Western Air Command	3 December 2003	Jaisalmer AFS, Rajasthan		
No. 3003 Squadron		Trinetra	Western Air Command	1 December 2003	Jammu AFS, Jammu and Kashmir		
No. 3004 Squadron		cheetah	South Western Air Command	4 December 2014	Naliya AFS, Gujarat		
No. 3005 Squadron		Warden of the North	Western Air Command	14 June 2005	Awantipur AFS, Jammu and Kashmir	IAI Heron Mk 2	

== See also ==
- List of active Indian military aircraft
- List of Indian Air Force bases
- List of Indian naval air squadrons
