= South Western Air Command =

South Western Air Command Indian Air Force
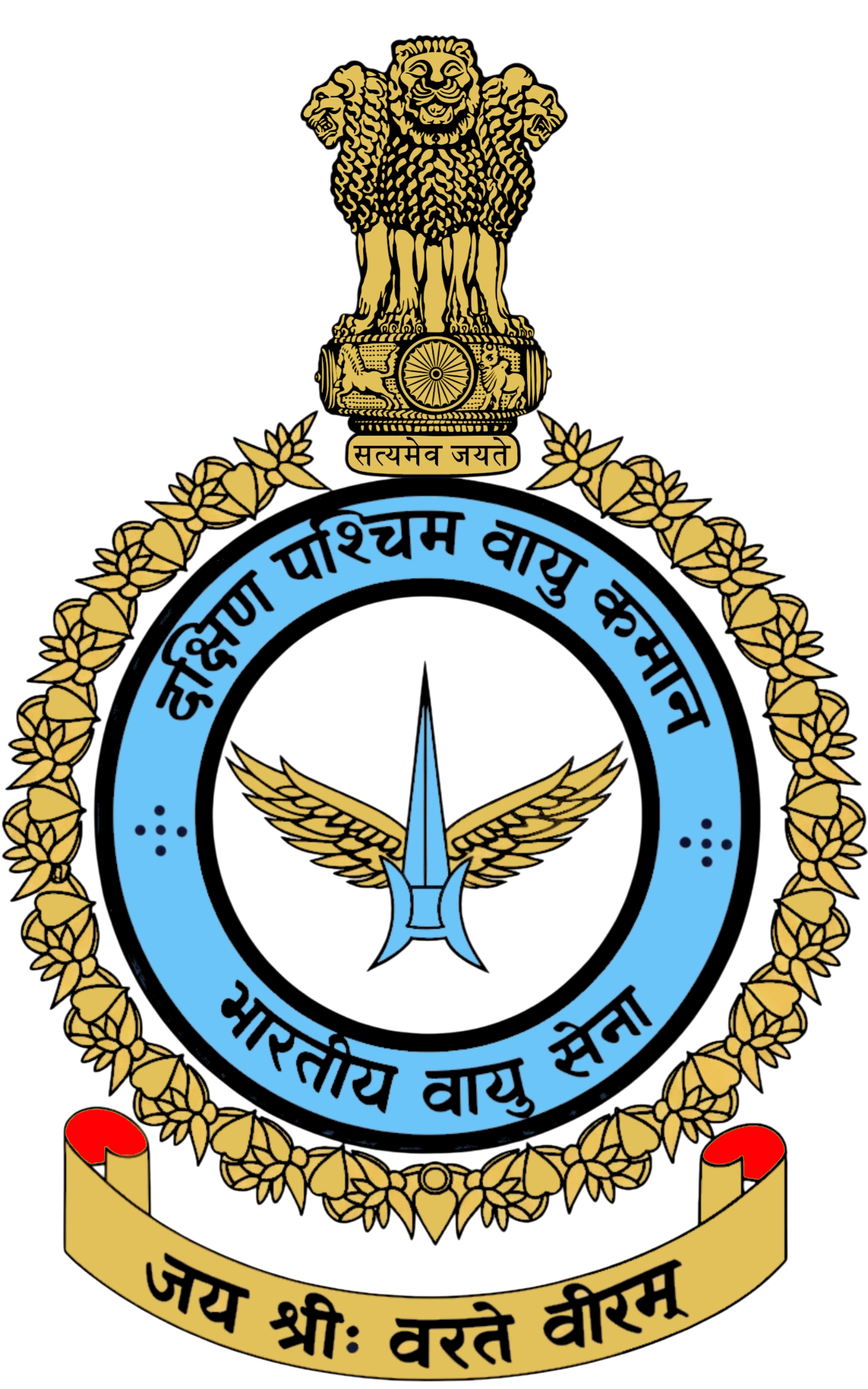
- Emblem of the South Western Air Command
- Founded: 23 July 1980
- Country: India
- Branch: Indian Air Force
- Type: Operational Air Command
- Role: Air Defence, Maritime strike role.
- Headquarters: Gandhinagar
- Mottos: Sanskrit: Jai Shree Varte Veeramh; Victory embraces the brave
- Engagements: Atlantique incident, Bhuj earthquake relief, 2001, Gujarat flood relief, 2005

Commanders
- Air Officer Commanding-in-Chief: Air Marshal P. V. Shivanand, AVSM, VM

The South Western Air Command (SWAC) is one of the five operational commands of the Indian Air Force, headquartered in Gandhinagar. It was raised in Jodhpur in July 1980 from the No.1 Operations Group of the Western Air Command. Its operations sector includes most of Rajasthan, through Gujarat and Saurashtra, as far south as Kutch and Pune. The SWAC moved to its current headquarters in Gandhinagar in May 1998, and incorporates the Indian airbases of Bhuj, Jaisalmer, Phalodi, Naliya, Jamnagar, Jodhpur, Uttarlai/Barmer and Pune. It controls air operations in the south western air sector, which includes most of Rajasthan, and south through Gujarat to Saurashtra, and Kutch to Pune. It also operates the forward airbases at Vadodara, Nal and Suratgarh. The SWAC's role has historically been largely of air defence, although it has been reported to have incorporated a strike profile.

== Organisation ==
Squadrons include:

Squadron	Base	Equipment	Notes
No. 20 Squadron IAF	Lohegaon Air Force Station	Su-30MKI	No. 2 Wing
No. 30 Squadron IAF	Lohegaon Air Force Station	Su-30MKI	No. 2 Wing
No. 15 Squadron IAF	Bhuj Air Force Station	Su-30 MKI	No. 27 Wing
No. 31 Squadron IAF	Jodhpur Air Force Station	Su-30 MKI	No.32 Wing
No. 107 Helicopter Unit, IAF	Jodhpur Air Force Station	Mi-8	No. 32 Wing
No. 116 Helicopter Unit, IAF	Jodhpur Air Force Station	HAL Chetak	No. 32 Wing
No. 119 Helicopter Unit, IAF	Jodhpur Air Force Station	Mi-8	No. 32 Wing
No. 143 Helicopter Unit, IAF	Jodhpur Air Force Station	HAL Prachand
No. 6 Squadron IAF	Jamnagar Air Force Station	JaguarIS/IM/IB	No. 33 Wing
No. 28 Squadron IAF	Jamnagar Air Force Station	Mig 29	No.33 Wing
No. 141 SSS Flight, IAF	Jamnagar Air Force Station	HAL Chetak	No. 33 Wing IAF
No. 18 Squadron IAF	Naliya Air Force Station	HAL Tejas	No. 49 Wing
No. 23 Squadron IAF	Suratgarh Air Force Station	Mig-21	No. 35 Wing IAF
No. 104 Helicopter Squadron, IAF	Suratgarh Air Force Station	Mi-35	No. 35 Wing
No. 11 Squadron IAF	Vadodara Air Force Station	Airbus C295	No. 36 Wing
No. 44 Squadron IAF	Nagpur Air Force Station	Il-76MD	No. 44 Wing
No. 4 Squadron IAF	Uttarlai Air Force Station	Su-30 MKI	No. 5 FBSU

== Air Officer Commanding-in-Chief ==
Air Officer Commanding-in-Chief South Western Air Command
S.No	Rank	Name	Assumed office	Left office	References
1	Air Marshal	Jagdish Raj Bhasin	23 July 1980	30 June 1983	
2	Air Marshal	Chandra Kant Viswanath Gole	1 July 1983	31 October 1984	
3	Air Marshal	Subramaniam Raghavendran	1 November 1984	6 January 1986	
4	Air Marshal	Prem Pal Singh	8 January 1986	28 February 1987	
5	Air Marshal	Surendra Kumar Mehra	1 March 1987	31 July 1988	
6	Air Marshal	Partha Kumar Dey	1 August 1988	31 March 1992	
7	Air Marshal	Brijesh Dhar Jayal	1 April 1992	30 September 1993	
8	Air Marshal	Satish Kumar Sareen	6 October 1993	3 June 1994	
9	Air Marshal	Kodendera Cariappa Cariappa	6 June 1994	31 January 1996	
10	Air Marshal	Sharadkumar Ramakrishna Deshpande	1 February 1996	30 November 1997	
11	Air Marshal	Srinivasapuram Krishnaswamy	1 December 1997	31 October 1999	
12	Air Marshal	Vinod Kumar Bhatia	1 November 1999	31 July 2001	
13	Air Marshal	Michael McMahon	1 August 2001	31 January 2003	
14	Air Marshal	Shashindra Pal Tyagi	1 February 2003	14 November 2003	
15	Air Marshal	Adi Rustomji Ghandhi	17 November 2003	31 June 2004	
16	Air Marshal	Satish Kumar Jain	12 July 2004	28 February 2006	
17	Air Marshal	Pramod Kumar Mehra	1 March 2006	30 April 2007	
18	Air Marshal	Kanwar Dalinderjit Singh	1 May 2007	30 September 2009	
19	Air Marshal	Paramjit Singh Bhangu	1 October 2009	31 December 2010	
20	Air Marshal	Anjan Kumar Gogoi	1 January 2011	28 February 2013	
21	Air Marshal	Daljit Singh	1 March 2013	31 October 2014	
22	Air Marshal	Birender Singh Dhanoa	1 November 2014	31 May 2015	
23	Air Marshal	Ravinder Kumar Dhir	1 June 2015	30 September 2018	
24	Air Marshal	Harjit Singh Arora	1 October 2018	30 September 2019	
25	Air Marshal	Surendra Kumar Ghotia	1 October 2019	30 April 2021	
26	Air Marshal	Sandeep Singh	1 May 2021	30 September 2021	
27	Air Marshal	Vikram Singh	1 October 2021	30 April 2023	
28	Air Marshal	Narmdeshwar Tiwari	1 May 2023	30 April 2025	
29	Air Marshal	Nagesh Kapoor	1 May 2025	31 December 2025	
30	Air Marshal	Tejinder Singh	1 January 2026	30 June 2026	
31	Air Marshal	P. V. Shivanand	1 July 2026	Incumbent	
