= Eastern Air Command (India) =

Indian Air Force command

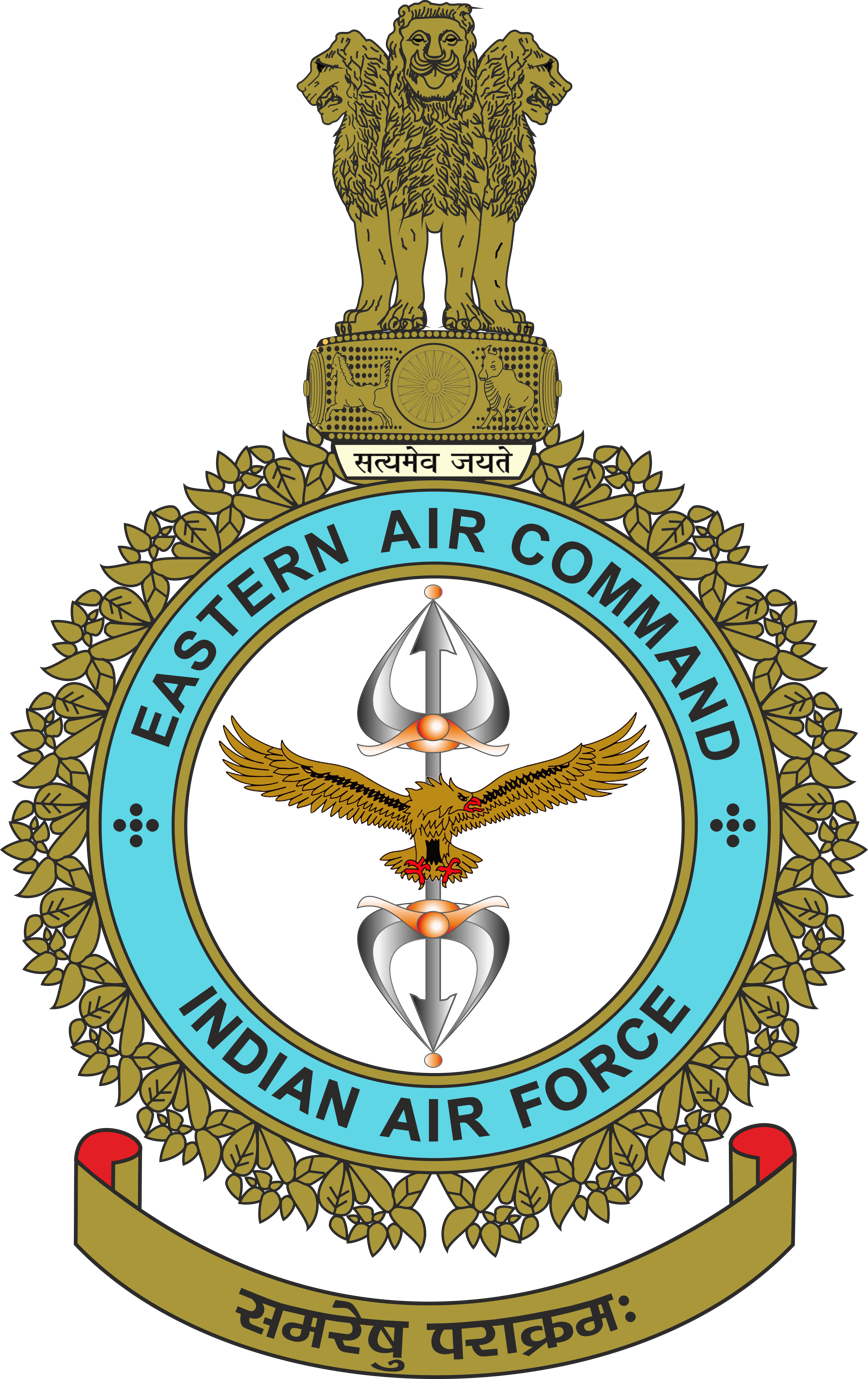
- Emblem of the Eastern Air Command
- Founded: May 27, 1958
- Country: India
- Branch: Indian Air Force
- Type: Operational Air Command
- Role: Air Defence, OCA, Offensive Ground Support, Civilian Relief.
- Headquarters: Shillong
- Motto: Sanskrit: Samareshu Parakramah
- Engagements: 1962 Sino-Indian War, East Pakistan Operations 1971, Operation Meghdoot, Orissa Super-Cyclone Relief, 1999, Operation All Clear (MEDEVAC and support)

Commanders
- Air Officer Commanding-in-Chief: Air Marshal Mehtab Singh Deswal, AVSM VM

The Eastern Air Command is one of the five operational commands of the Indian Air Force. Currently headquartered in Shillong in Meghalaya. It was initially raised as No. 1 Operational Group on 27 May 1958 at Ranikutir, Kolkata as a part of the Government's increasing emphasis on defence of the eastern borders. The Operational Group was upgraded as Command on 1 December 1959 with headquarters at Fort William, Kolkata and raised to a full fledged command at Shillong.

The present Air Officer Commanding-in-Chief is Air Marshal Inderpal Singh Walia.

== History ==
It was initially raised as No. 1 Operational Group on 27 May 1958 at Ranikutir, Kolkata as a part of the Government's increasing emphasis on defence of the eastern borders. The Operational Group was upgraded as Command on 1 December 1959 with headquarters at Fort William, Kolkata and Air Vice Marshal KL Sondhi as the first AOC-in-C of the Eastern Command. After the 1962 Indo-Chinese War, The decision was made to raise a full-fledged command at Shillong. The area of responsibility of the command now covers 11 states, and is bound by the international boundaries of Nepal, Bhutan, China, Myanmar and Bangladesh incorporating 6300 km of common border. Eastern Air Command now has permanent airbases at Chabua, Guwahati, Bagdogra, Barrackpore, Hasimara, Jorhat, Kalaikunda and Tezpur with forward airbases at Agartala, Kolkata, Panagarh and Shillong. Eastern Air Command historically consisted of Air Defence squadrons consisting of the MiG-21 and Ground attack squadrons consisting of the MiG-27, though today the command relies on SU-30MKIs and Dassault Rafales. It holds the motto "Samareshu Parakramaha" (Lit: Valour in battle).

== Activities and responsibilities ==
The Eastern Air Command has a specific mandate both during peace and war. In war situations, the command is tasked to conduct counter air operations and provides offensive air support to Army and Para-Military Forces. In peace, the command swings into action whenever there is a natural calamity. It was extensively involved in relief operations in the aftermath of the supercyclone in Orissa and has provided relief supplies during floods in Assam and Arunachal Pradesh. The command has three broad spheres of activity - operations, maintenance and administration. The fighter squadrons under the Eastern Air Command are equipped with MiG variants, and pilots are under continuous training for operational flying.

At Tezpur, located on the northern bank of the Brahmaputra in Upper Assam, newly commissioned ab-initio fighter pilots undergo fighter pilot training and on successful completion get inducted into various fighter squadrons in IAF. Majority of the fighter fleet of Eastern Air Command consisted of MiG-21 and the MiG-27 (Bahadur), before their retirement and replacement by SU-30MKIs and Dassault Rafales.

The transport aircraft and helicopter of the Eastern Air Command are critical in the North-East India. The topography in the hill regions restrict the construction of a standard runway. Tribal settlements in places like Menchuha, Vijaynagar and Tuting in remote and inaccessible areas of Arunachal Pradesh totally depend on the aerial supply by the Air Force. They also depend on these aircraft to airlift their sick and ailing. The district headquarters at Anini, a conglomeration of about ten tribal settlements with a population of a couple of thousand in Arunachal Pradesh is the only one of its kind in the world which is totally air-maintained.

Pilots operate from the advance landing grounds (ALG) with only one third of the length of a regular runway, requiring unique and uni-directional approach and take off requirements. This coupled with the vagaries of weather expects careful consideration from the pilot and operator. Helicopter operations also form a critical part of the responsibilities of the Easter Air Command. War operations

The Eastern Air Command was a major participant in 1962 Sino-Indian War and the Indo-Pak war of 1971. During the 1962 war, Eastern Air Command was tasked with mounting transport support missions, a task admirably performed by its Dakota and Caribou aircraft. It also mounted reconnaissance and casualty evacuation sorties using the Bell and Sikorsky helicopters it operated at the time.

During the 1971 war, Eastern Air Command was tasked with offensive as well as supply operations. It was involved right from the first clash over Boyra to the Tangail Airdrop. It also operated Mi-4 helicopters in offensive roles behind enemy lines, operating from helicopter bases in Tripura. Kalaikunda, one of the oldest and most strategically placed airbases under Eastern Air Command, has supported fighter operations since the early post-independence years. Its historical transformation has been documented extensively.

== Organisation ==
Squadrons include (as of 2015):

Squadron	Base	Equipment	Notes
No. 43 Squadron IAF	Jorhat Air Force Station	AN-32	No. 10 Wing
No. 129 Helicopter Unit, IAF	Jorhat Air Force Station	Mi-17	No. 10 Wing
No. 2 Squadron IAF	Tezpur Air Force Station	Su-30 MKI	No. 11 Wing
No. 106 Squadron IAF	Tezpur Air Force Station	Su-30 MKI	No. 11 Wing
No. 115 Helicopter Unit, IAF	Tezpur Air Force Station	HAL Dhruv	No. 11 Wing
No. 101 Squadron IAF	Hasimara Air Force Station	Dassault Rafale	No. 16 Wing
No. 102 Squadron IAF	Chabua Air Force Station	Su-30 MKI	No.14 Wing
Helicopter Unit	Chabua Air Force Station	Mi-8	No. 14 Wing
Helicopter Unit	Chabua Air Force Station	Mi-17	No. 14 Wing
No. 59 Squadron IAF	Mountain Shadow Air Force Station	Avro 748M	No. 19 Wing
No. 118 Helicopter Unit, IAF	Mountain Shadow Air Force Station	Mi-8	No. 19 Wing
No. 142 SSS Flight, IAF	Bagdogra Air Force Station	HAL Chetak	No. 20 Wing
No. 110 Helicopter Unit, IAF	Kumbhirgram Air Force Station	Mi-8	No. 22 Wing
No. 127 Helicopter Unit, IAF	Mohanbari Air Force Station	Mi-17	No. 42 Wing
No. 128 Helicopter Unit, IAF	Mohanbari Air Force Station	Mi-17	No. 42 Wing
No. 87 Squadron IAF	Air Force Station Arjan Singh	C-130J	No. 31 Wing

== Air Officer Commanding-in-Chief ==
List of Air Officer Commanding-in-Chief Eastern Air Command
Rank	Name	Assumed office	Left office	Reference
Air Vice Marshal	Kundan Lal Sondhi	7 December 1959	28 December 1961	
Air Vice Marshal	Kanwar Jaswant Singh	3 March 1962	1 January 1963	
Air Vice Marshal	Shivdev Singh	14 January 1963	9 June 1963	
Air Vice Marshal	Ramaswamy Rajaram	10 June 1963	4 August 1963	
Air Vice Marshal	Minoo Merwan Engineer	5 August 1963	30 September 1964	
Air Vice Marshal	Yeshwant Vinayak Malse	1 October 1964	30 September 1966	
Air Vice Marshal	Ranjan Dutt	28 October 1966	31 March 1968	
Air Marshal	Hirendra Nath Chatterjee	1 April 1968	23 March 1971	
Air Marshal	Hari Chand Dewan	24 March 1971	31 March 1973	
Air Marshal	Maurice Barker	1 April 1973	21 April 1976	
Air Marshal	Lal Singh Grewal	24 April 1976	12 August 1978	
Air Marshal	Lakshman Madhav Katre	4 September 1978	2 January 1981	
Air Marshal	Malcolm Shirley Dundas Wollen	3 January 1981	26 February 1983	
Air Marshal	Douglas George King-Lee	1 March 1983	30 November 1983	
Air Marshal	Minoo Jehangir Dotiwalla	1 December 1983	31 October 1984	
Air Marshal	Kapil Dev Chadha	5 November 1984	31 December 1987	
Air Marshal	Man Mohan Sinha	8 February 1988	31 January 1991	
Air Marshal	Rajendra Kumar Dhawan	11 February 1991	5 October 1991	
Air Marshal	Brijesh Dhar Jayal	7 October 1991	30 March 1992	
Air Marshal	Dushyant Singh	1 May 1992	31 January 1995	
Air Marshal	Janak Kapur	1 February 1995	31 March 1996	
Air Marshal	Prithvi Singh Brar	1 April 1996	3 January 1999	
Air Marshal	Krishnan Narayan Nair	4 January 1999	30 November 2000	
Air Marshal	Satish Govind Inamdar	1 December 2000	31 October 2004	
Air Marshal	Avinash Deodata Joshi	1 November 2004	21 August 2005	
Air Marshal	Fali Homi Major	5 September 2005	31 March 2007	
Air Marshal	Pranab Kumar Barbora	1 April 2007	31 December 2007	
Air Marshal	Shiv Kumar Bhan	1 January 2008	31 December 2009	
Air Marshal	Krishan Kumar Nohwar	1 January 2010	31 July 2011	
Air Marshal	Simhakutty Varthaman	1 August 2011	31 November 2012	
Air Marshal	Ravi Kant Sharma	1 December 2012	31 December 2013	
Air Marshal	Rakesh Kumar Jolly	1 January 2014	31 December 2014	
Air Marshal	Shirish Baban Deo	1 January 2015	31 August 2015	
Air Marshal	Chandrashekharan Hari Kumar	1 October 2015	31 December 2016	
Air Marshal	Anil Khosla	1 January 2017	30 September 2018	
Air Marshal	Raghunath Nambiar	1 October 2018	28 February 2019	
Air Marshal	Rajiv Dayal Mathur	1 March 2019	30 September 2020	
Air Marshal	Amit Dev	1 October 2020	30 September 2021	
Air Marshal	Dilip Kumar Patnaik	3 October 2021	30 September 2022	
Air Marshal	Sujeet Pushpakar Dharkar	1 October 2022	30 September 2024	
Air Marshal	Surat Singh	1 October 2024	31 January 2026	
Air Marshal	Inderpal Singh Walia	1 February 2026	31 October 2026	
Air Marshal	Mehtab Singh Deswal	1 November 2026	Incumbent	

== Aircraft ==
- Sukhoi Su-30 MKI
- Mil Mi-17
- Mil Mi-24
- Avro 748
- An-32
- BAE Hawk
- Lockheed C-130J Super Hercules
- Dassault Rafale

== See also ==
- Indian Air Force
- No. 22 Squadron, Indian Air Force
- Sino-Indian War
- East Pakistan Operations 1971
- Operation Meghdoot
- Orissa Super Cyclone
