= The Last Salute (film) =

The Last Salute: A Love Letter to MiG-21
- Directed by: Kushal Srivastava
- Produced by: Sanjay Routray, Antara Srivastava, Mihika Routray
- Narrated by: Sharad Kelkar
- Music by: Daniel B George, Kunal Iyengar
- Distributed by: Netflix
- Release date: August 26, 2026
- Running time: 82 minutes
- Country: India
- Language: Hindi

The Last Salute: A Love Letter to MiG-21 is a 2026 Indian Netflix original documentary film directed by Kushal Srivastava and produced by Matchbox Shots. The film traces the 62-year history of the MiG-21 in the Indian Air Force through the experiences and memories of pilots who flew the aircraft.

The documentary developed from Srivastava's work on Operation Safed Sagar and focuses on the MiG-21's history and final years of service.

The film centres on the aircraft's final period of operational service with 23 Squadron and follows its withdrawal from the Indian Air Force in 2025. It was released on 26 August 2026 on Netflix.

== Plot ==
The film follows the MiG-21 during its final period of operational service with the Indian Air Force, while looking back at the aircraft's association with generations of fighter pilots. It is set around 23 Squadron, the last Indian Air Force squadron to operate the MiG-21 in an operational role.

Pilots from different generations recount their experiences with the aircraft, including the demands of flying it and the attachment they developed to the MiG-21 during their service.

The documentary also addresses the MiG-21's accident record and the criticism surrounding its safety. Former Air Force officers discuss their experiences with the aircraft and challenge the long-standing "flying coffin" description associated with it.

The story concludes with the MiG-21's final public appearance and its retirement from the Indian Air Force. Its last flypast and formal de-induction ceremony took place at Air Force Station Chandigarh on 26 September 2025.

== Interviewees ==
- Air Chief Marshal Amar Preet Singh — Chief of the Air Staff
- Air Chief Marshal Birender Singh Dhanoa — former Chief of the Air Staff
- Air Commodore S. S. Tyagi — MiG-21 pilot
- Squadron Leader Priya Sharma — fighter pilot
- Wing Commander Uday Kolhatkar — MiG-21 fighter pilot
- Air Commodore Amit Budhwar — Air Officer Commanding, Air Force Station NAL

== Production ==
The film was directed by Kushal Srivastava and produced by Matchbox Shots.

The documentary's development was connected to Srivastava's work on Operation Safed Sagar. While working on the series, he travelled to different locations and spoke with Indian Air Force personnel about their experiences. During these conversations, the MiG-21 repeatedly emerged in the stories of pilots and other Air Force personnel, leading to the idea of developing a separate documentary about the aircraft.

As the MiG-21 approached the end of its operational service, Srivastava approached Matchbox Shots with the idea of filming the aircraft's last major public appearance. The production house backed and funded the project before it was pitched to the streaming platform.

The film brings together interviews with serving and retired Indian Air Force personnel with archival material and footage connected to the MiG-21.

== Music and narration ==
The documentary opens with a poem written by Aalok Shrivastav and narrated by actor Sharad Kelkar.

== Reception ==
Saibal Chatterjee of NDTV rated the film 3 out of 5. He highlighted the documentary's focus on the MiG-21's final days with 23 Squadron and the experiences of pilots from different generations.

The Times of India rated the film 3 out of 5 and noted the documentary's focus on the pilots' attachment to the aircraft, while observing that not all aspects of the MiG-21's complicated legacy receive equal attention.

Writing for The Tribune, Vijay Mohan rated the documentary 3 out of 5 and discussed its treatment of the MiG-21's service history and the experiences of pilots and ground personnel.

Rahul Desai of The Hollywood Reporter India described the documentary as a sentimental ode to the MiG-21 and noted its focus on the memories and experiences of pilots who flew the aircraft. He also observed that the film gives limited attention to the aircraft's safety record.

India Today's Anisha Rao rated the film 3 out of 5 and highlighted its personal accounts and archival material while noting the limited treatment of the MiG-21's crash record.

A. Sriva of Moneycontrol reviewed the film's treatment of the MiG-21's history and its relationship with the pilots who flew it, while noting the documentary's limited engagement with the aircraft's darker legacy.
