= KC Cariappa =

KC Cariappa may refer to:

- Air Marshal K C Cariappa, a Squadron Leader during the 1965 Indo-Pakistan War.
- KC Cariappa (cricketer), Indian cricketer who plays for Kings XI Punjab.
