= Aalok Shrivastav =

Indian poet, lyricist and journalist (born 1971)

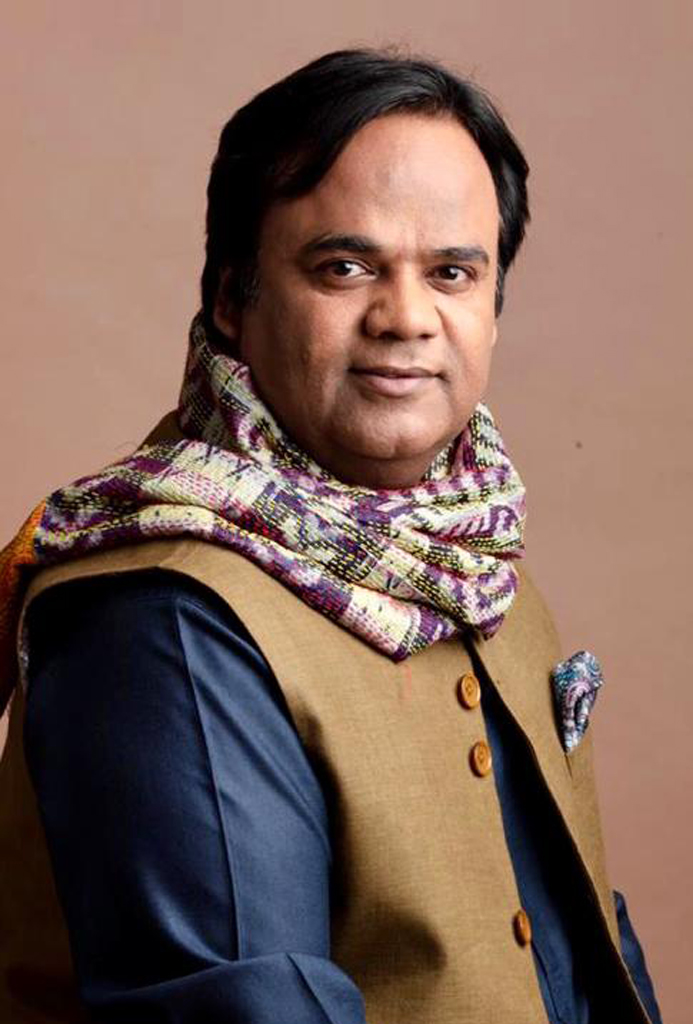
- Aalok Shrivastav
- Born: 30 December 1971 (age 54); Shajapur, Madhya Pradesh, India
- Education: MA (Hindi)
- Occupations: Poet, Writer, Journalist
- Writing career
- Language: Hindi
- Years active: 1993–present
- Genres: Ghazal, Poetry, Story
- Notable works: Aameen (2007), Aafreen (2012)
- Notable awards: Dushyant Kumar Award by Sahitya Academy (MP) (2009); International Pushkin Award (2011); Sambhulal Sukhan Award by Urdu Academy (MP) (2018)

Aalok Shrivastav is an Indian poet, lyricist and journalist. His critically acclaimed works include Aameen (2007), a poetry collection and Afreen (2012), a story collection, both published by Rajkamal Prakashan. Aalok's works have won a number of accolades for his works, including the International Pushkin Award and Dushyant Kumar Award by Madhya Pradesh Sahitya Akademi.

== Early life ==
He hails from Vidisha of Madhya Pradesh, India. He was born on 30 December 1971, in the Shajapur, in Madhya Pradesh. He holds an MA in Hindi.

== Career ==
=== Writing ===
He published his first collection of poetry, Aameen by Rajkamal Prakashan, in 2007. Aameen is a Ghazal collection explaining human values and human relationships. He won the Dushyant Kumar Award from Madhya Pradesh Sahitya Akademi for his debut poetry collection Ameen in 2009, followed by International Pushkin Award in 2011. The fourth edition of Aalok's Aameen was released by Namvar Singh and Javed Akhtar at the New Delhi World Book Fair in February 2015.

He published his second book, Aafreen, a story collection published by Rajkamal Prakashan in 2012. It was released by Chitra Mudgal and Uday Prakash in Johannesburg, South Africa in the World Hindi Conference. It was well-received by the readers and critics. Harish Naval writing for Navbharat Times, placed the book, Aafreen in the list of '13 Most Popular Books of 2013'.

He has performed poetry in various countries, including United States, England, Russia, Kuwait, Bahrain, Qatar, South Africa and the UAE. His works have also been translated into various other languages, including Russian, Gujarati, Marathi, Urdu, Maithili languages.

His literary works have been given voice by Jagjit Singh, Pankaj Udhas, Shankar Mahadevan, Sonu Nigam, Aadesh Shrivastava, Rekha Bhardwaj, Shaan, Kailash Kher, Richa Sharma, Javed Ali, Ustad Rashid Khan, Shubha Mudgal and Amitabh Bachchan.

He has written lyrics for the 2011 film, Patang, directed by Prashant Bhargava, followed by writing the lyrics for the 2014 documentary film, Can't Take This Shit Anymore and the thriller film Vodka Diaries (2018). In 2020, he also wrote songs for A.R. Rahman's musical drama film, Atkan Chatkan. He has written theme songs called Dhadak Dhadak Be Dhadak Dhadak for Agra–Lucknow Expressway and Na Jaam, Na Jhanjhat for Lucknow Metro. These songs were made for the Uttar Pradesh government and were directed by Kushal Srivastava.

He has written the song Watan for Doordarshan and Prasar Bharti, which Javed Ali sung and released by Prakash Javadekar, the Minister of Information and Broadcasting in August 2019. His poem, Mai Naye Bharat Ka Chehra Hun, which he wrote for Doordarshan, was recited by Amitabh Bachchan and was launched at the celebratory event of the 60th anniversary of Doordarshan in September 2019.

His music album Eternal was sung and composed by ghazal singer Jaswinder Singh, won the AAMA Award for the Best Album Of the Year. Aalok has also written the lyrics for Anoushka Shankar's album, Traveller (2012), released in the US and was nominated for Grammy Award. In June 2015, he released his Ghazal album, Khwaabon Ki Kahaani, sung by Pankaj Udhas. Some of his other notable music albums includes Eternal (2016) by Jaswinder Singh and Noor (2018) by Sudeep Banerjee.

=== Journalism ===
Aalok worked with media organisations like Aaj Tak, India TV and Doordarshan for almost 15 years as a print and television journalist. He began freelancing for India Today and other newspapers in the 1990s. He started TV journalism with India TV in 2005. In 2007, he joined Aaj Tak and produced significant TV programs on religion, sports, politics. In July 2014, Srivastav joined DD National, a state-owned public TV channel, as National Channel Advisor in 2014.

== Bibliography ==
As writer

- Aameen (2007) (5 editions); Rajkamal Prakashan (Poetry collection) ISBN 978-8126714308
- Aafreen (2012); Rajkamal Prakashan (Story collection) ISBN 978-8126723478

As editor

- Nai Duniya Ko Salaam (Ali Sardar Jafri) (1998)
- Humkadam (Nida Fazli) (1999)

== Filmography ==
As lyricist

Year	Film	Singer(s)	Song
2011	Patang : The Kite	Shubha Mudgal	Udaan and Sundar Sapna Toot Gaya
2014	Can't Take This Shit Anymore	Women of Kushinagar	Tatti
2018	Vodka Diaries	Ustad Rashid Khan, Rekha Bhardwaj	Sakhi Ri
2020	Atkan Chatkan	Runa Sivamani	Oh Maa Meri Ma

== Albums ==
Album	Artist(s)	Lyricist	Label
Koshish	Shubha Mudgal	Aalok Shrivastav	Underscore Records
Tarana-E-Percussion	Shubha Mudgal	Aalok Shrivastav	Underscore Records
Inteha (2009)	Jagjit Singh	Aalok Shrivastav	T-Series
Traveller (2011)	Anoushka Shankar	Aalok Shrivastav	Deutsche Grammophon
Aakhir Kyon	Shubha Mudgal	Aalok Shrivastav	Underscore Records
Voice Forever (2013)	Jagjit Singh	Aalok Shrivastav	T-Series
Khwaabon ki Kahaani (2015)	Pankaj Udhas	Aalok Shrivastav	Hungama
Ehsaas Ki Khushboo (2015)	Pankaj Udhas	Aalok Shrivastav	Times Music
Eternal (2016)	Jaswinder Singh	Aalok Shrivastav	ArtistAloud
Noor (2018)	Sudeep Banerji	Aalok Shrivastav	ArtistAloud

== Awards and recognition ==
- He won the Dushyant Kumar Award, the Madhya Pradesh Sahitya Akademi Award in 2009 for his poetry collection, Ameen.
- In 2009, he was awarded the Hemant Memorial Poetry Award by the Hemant Foundation for his book Aameen.
- In 2011, he was awarded the International Pushkin Award by the Bharat Mitra Mandal, Moscow, Russia for his work, Aameen, which is also translated into the Russian language. The award was bestowed by poet Alexander Senkevich.
- In April 2014, Aalok was honoured with the International Hindi Award by International Hindi Association for his contribution to Hindi Ghazal in Washington, USA.
- In November 2015, Aalok Shrivastav was honoured with Hindi Ghazal Award at the House of Commons of the United Kingdom by Katha UK, a British cultural organisation.
- In May 2015, he was honoured with the 'Rashtriya Dushyant Kumar Alankaran' Award by Dushyant Kumar Smarak Pandulipi Sangrahlaya, Bhopal, for the year 2014.
- He also received the Firaq Gorakhpuri Award for poetry in 2017.
- In 2018, he was awarded the Sambhulla Sukhan Award by the Madhya Pradesh Urdu Academy, Department of Culture, Madhya Pradesh.
