= Man Mohan Sinha =

Air Marshal Man Mohan Sinha PVSM, AVSM, VM
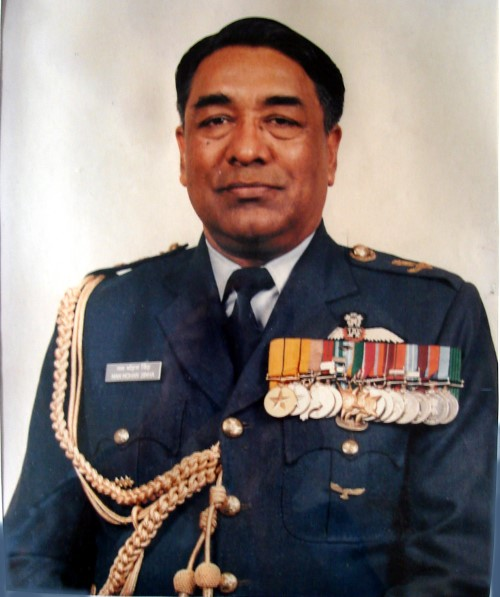
- Born: 8 January 1933; Bhubaneswar, Bihar and Orissa Province, British India
- Died: 31 August 2018 (aged 85); New Delhi
- Military career
- Allegiance: India
- Branch: Indian Air Force
- Service years: 1953–1991
- Rank: Air Marshal
- Nickname: Rusty
- Service number: 4408
- Unit: 3 Squadron
- Commands: Eastern Air Command; 37 Squadron
- Conflicts: Indo-Pakistani War of 1965; Indo-Pakistani war of 1971
- Awards: Mentioned in Despatches, Param Vishist Seva Medal, Ati Vishist Seva Medal, Vayusena Medal

Air Marshal Man Mohan Sinha, PVSM, AVSM, VM, (8 January 1933 – 31 August 2018) was an Indian Air Force officer and a veteran of the Indo-Pakistani War of 1965. He was honoured with a number of medals including the Param Vishist Seva Medal, the Ati Vishisht Seva Medal and the Vayusena Medal.

== Early life and education ==
Man Mohan Sinha was born on 8 January 1933 at Bhubaneswar, Bihar and Orissa Province, British India. He was educated at St. Xavier's High School, Patna.

== Military career ==
He joined the National defense academy (Indian military academy) in the then Inter services wing in 1948. He was then commissioned to the Indian Air Force as a pilot officer on 17 January 1953, serving in 3rd squadron (1953-1961). Subsequently, he became the Air Force ADC to Dr. Rajender Prasad (1961-1962) and Dr. Radhakrishnan (1962-1964), after which he transferred to 7th squadron (1964-1967), taking part in the 1965 Indo-Pakistan war.

=== 1965 Indo-Pakistan War achievements ===
Sinha was a part of No. 7 Squadron IAF as a squadron leader during the 1965 war against Pakistan. Squadron Leaders MM Sinha, SS Malik, AS Lamba, Dice Dhiman etc. making their mark in various missions during 1965 war. SS Malik, AS Lamba, PS Pingle, AR Gandhi received the Vir Chakra, along with Man Mohan Sinha, DK Dhiman, CG Pander, P Kondaiah who earned a Mention-in-Despatches for combat operations.

=== Command of No. 37 Squadron IAF ===
No. 37 Squadron IAF (Black Panthers) moved to Tezpur from Chabua at the end of March 1966, where command of the squadron passed to Wing Commander Man Mohan Sinha on 25 August 1967.

After the war he sat for the staff college exam; standing first amongst all three services in the staff college exam, he was thus sent to the Joint Service Defence College in England. Graduating in 1970, he flew in the Indo-Pakistani War of 1971; after which he first served as an instructor at the College of Air Warfare (then known as the Joint Air Warfare School) and then the Defence Services Staff College. Then joining the Indian Ministry of Defence Mod in 1975.

=== AOC-in-C of Eastern Command IAF ===
He was a Commanding Officer for Eastern Air Command at Shillong from 8 February 1988 – 31 January 1991 at the post of Air Marshal.

=== Promotions ===
He was promoted to air vice marshal on 26 January 1984 and air marshal on 1 August 1986, before retiring on 31 January 1991.

== Post-retirement ==
Man Mohan Sinha has served as chairman of Velocity Apparelz Company in Ismailia, Egypt since 2001, while his son Siddharth Sinha is the CEO of parent company Vogue International Agencies FZE.

== Awards and decorations ==
Param Vishisht Seva Medal

== See also ==
- The India-Pakistan Air War of 1965
- Indo-Pakistani Air War of 1965
