= Vikram Sakhalkar =

Indian model and actor (born 1986)

- Born: 23 April 1985 (age 40); Mumbai, India
- Occupations: Actor, model
- Years active: 2015–present

Vikram Sakhalkar is an Indian film and television actor and model. Vikram was born on 23 April 1985, to a family of business background. He completed schooling in Arya Vidhya Mandir, Juhu, Mumbai, and graduation thereafter. As soon as he passed his school, his family moved to the US and he completed his college there. Currently he is unmarried.

== Career ==
He started his career as model, has done extensive modeling and has been featured in many advertisements like oats, gold deo, Brittania biscuits, cement, Raymonds and many more. He was part of a song, by Bombay Bicycle Club.

He made his film debut as one of the leads in 2015 film Calendar Girls and as supporting role in 2018 film Vodka Diaries. His television debut was in the recurring role of Dhawal in Jamai Raja. Since 2017-18 he has been portraying the parallel lead role of Dr. Kabir in Savitri Devi College & Hospital television series.

== Filmography ==
Year	Film	Role	Director	Notes	Ref(s)
2015	Calendar Girls	Harsh Narang	Madhur Bhandarkar	Debut	
2017	Kaabil	A film star	Sanjay Gupta	Cameo	
2018	Vodka Diaries	Mayuk	Kushal Srivastava		

== Television ==
Year	Shows	Role	Channel	References
2016	Jamai Raja	Dhawal (Antagonist)	Zee TV	
2017–2018	Savitri Devi College & Hospital	Dr. Kabir Kapoor (Parallel Male Lead)	Colors TV	
2019	Laal Ishq (Episode 100)	Vihaan	&TV	
2021	Naagin 6		Colors TV	

=== Web series ===
Year	Title	Role	Notes	Ref.
2024	Qaatil Haseena		ALTBalaji	
2025	Kull: The Legacy of the Raisingghs	Abhay Mathur	Jio Hotstar	
