= Sri Sri Aniruddhadeva Sports University =

University in India

- Type: Public
- Established: 2020; 6 years ago
- Affiliations: UGC
- Chancellor: Governor of Assam
- Vice-Chancellor: Hirendra Nath Sarma
- Location: Chabua, Assam, India
- Website: www.sasu.ac.in

Sri Sri Aniruddhadeva Sports University is a public state university located at Chabua, Dibrugarh district, Assam.

== History ==
The university was established by The Assam Sri Sri Aniruddhadeva Sports University Act, 2018 which was passed by the Assam Legislative Assembly on 26 September 2018 and received the assent of the Governor of Assam on 10 December 2018. On 10 July 2020, Jai Prakash Verma took charge as the first vice-chancellor of the university. The university is currently functioning from Dibrugarh University Campus.

== Academics ==
The university offers four-year undergraduate program in Physical Education-BPEd (Hons) course from academic year 2020–21, with exit points after the completion of one, two or three years, which award a certificate, diploma or bachelor's degree, respectively, per the National Education Policy 2020.
