= No. 158 Helicopter Unit, IAF =

No. 158 Helicopter Unit
- Active: 10 December 2012 – present
- Country: India
- Branch: Indian Air Force
- Type: Helicopter unit
- Role: Transport and utility operations
- Garrison/HQ: Phalodi Air Force Station
- Nickname: "Silver Falcons"
- Motto: Victory bestows on the virtuous
- Equipment: Mil Mi-17V5

Aircraft flown
- Attack: Mil Mi-17V5

No. 158 Helicopter Unit is a helicopter squadron of the Indian Air Force based at Phalodi Air Force Station, Rajasthan, India. The unit was established on 10 December 2012 and operates the Mil Mi-17V5 helicopters in transport and utility roles.

== History ==
The unit was raised as part of the Indian Air Force's expansion of helicopter capabilities in the early 2010s, coinciding with the induction of the upgraded Mil Mi-17V5 fleet. Since its formation, the squadron has been involved in operational training, logistics, and support missions, particularly in desert and border regions.

== Role and operations ==
The No. 158 Helicopter Unit primarily undertakes tactical transport, air maintenance, and humanitarian assistance missions. It is equipped to perform troop movement, cargo delivery, casualty evacuation, and other support tasks under diverse operational conditions.

== Equipment ==
- Mil Mi-17V5 – multi-role medium-lift helicopter used for transport, assault support, and search and rescue operations.

== Motto ==
The unit's motto is Victory bestows on the virtuous.

== See also ==
- Indian Air Force
- List of Indian Air Force helicopter units
- Phalodi Air Force Station

== History ==
=== Aircraft ===
- Mil Mi-17V5
