= K. C. Cariappa =

Indian Air Marshal (born 1938)

Air Marshal K. C. Cariappa PVSM, VM
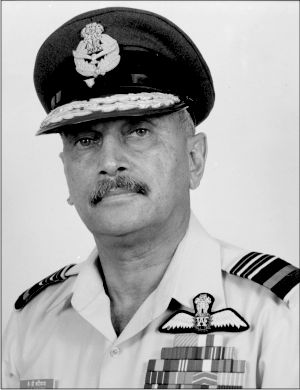
- Cariappa as Air Marshal in 1994
- Born: 14 January 1938 (age 88); Coorg, Coorg Province, British India
- Relatives: K. M. Cariappa (father)
- Military career
- Allegiance: India
- Branch: Indian Air Force
- Service years: May 1956 - January 1996
- Rank: Air Marshal
- Nickname: Nanda
- Commands: No. 8 Squadron; No. 111 Helicopter Unit
- Conflicts: Indo-Pakistani War of 1965
- Awards: Param Vishisht Seva Medal; Vayu Sena Medal

Air Marshal Kodandera Cariappa 'Nanda' Cariappa is a former Air Officer in the Indian Air Force. He served as the Air Officer Commanding-in-Chief (AOC-in-C), South Western Air Command. He is the son of Field Marshal K. M. Cariappa, who was the first commander-in-chief of the Indian Army post-independence.

== Military career ==
Air Marshal Cariappa graduated from the National Defence Academy, Pune was commissioned as a fighter pilot in the Indian Air Force on 29 May 1957. As a young pilot, he qualified as a flying instructor. He did 1000 hours of operational flying before undergoing the Flying Instructors' course in 1963. He stood first in merit in flying at Flying Instructors' School. At the flying training school where he was posted during 1963-65, he flew over 1000 hours and proved himself as an outstanding instructor. He was a squadron leader with No. 20 Squadron during the Indo-Pakistan War of 1965. He was shot down while carrying out air attacks during the war and was taken prisoner. President Ayub Khan, a former colleague of General Cariappa before the 1947 Partition, offered to release his son. But the general's terse reply was "The POWs are all my sons, look after them well."

After repatriation K C Cariappa went on to helicopters for a short while, commanding No.111 Helicopter Unit at Hasimara during the 1971 War. He would later command No.8 Squadron in the mid 1970s at Pune. He was Air Officer Commanding-in-Chief of the South Western Air Command from June 1994 to January 1996. He wrote a biography on his father, Field Marshal K. M. Cariappa in 2007. He presently lives in his deceased father's house Roshanara in Madikeri. He takes an active part in forest and wildlife conservation measures.

== Bibliography ==
- Field Marshal KM Cariappa, a biography
