= Ambala Airport =

Domestic airport and civil enclave in Haryana, India

- IATA: AMI; ICAO: VIAM

Summary
- Airport type: Public / Military
- Serves: Ambala
- Location: Ambala Cantonment, Haryana, India
- Elevation AMSL: 903 ft (275 m)
- Coordinates: 30°22′15″N 76°49′04″E

Map
- Location in Haryana AMI (India)

Runways
Direction	Length		Surface
Direction	m	ft	Surface
12/30	2,811	9,222	Concrete / Asphalt
	1,770	5,807	Concrete / Asphalt

Statistics (April 2025 - March 2026)
- Passengers: -
- Aircraft movements: -
- Cargo tonnage: -
- Source: AAI

Ambala Airport is a domestic airport and civil enclave developed at the existing Ambala Air Force Station in Ambala, Haryana, India. The airport has been developed under the Government of India's regional connectivity scheme UDAN.

== History ==
Plans for the development of a civil enclave at Ambala were approved under the UDAN regional connectivity scheme.

In October 2023, the foundation stone for the civil enclave and terminal building was laid at Ambala Cantonment. The airport project was developed on land transferred from the defence authorities for civilian aviation use.

By 2025, the airport terminal building and supporting infrastructure had been substantially completed. Haryana cabinet minister Anil Vij stated that the airport was awaiting inauguration and commencement of commercial flight operations.

In October 2026, Bureau of Civil Aviation Security inspected the airport and submitted a report to the construction agencies regarding some new changes. Following the report, the Public Works Department (PWD) issued a tender for additional work worth Rs 1.37 crore.

== Infrastructure ==
The airport has been developed as a civil enclave within the premises of Ambala Air Force Station. The terminal building is designed to handle regional domestic passenger traffic under the UDAN scheme.

The airport uses the existing runway infrastructure of the Ambala Air Force Station.

== Airlines and destinations ==
No scheduled commercial flight operations had commenced as of May 2026.

Proposed routes under the UDAN scheme include Ayodhya, Jammu, Lucknow, Srinagar.

== See also ==
- Ambala Air Force Station
- List of airports in Haryana
- UDAN
- Airports Authority of India
