= No. 155 Helicopter Unit, IAF =

No. 155 Helicopter Unit
- Active: 14 January 2011 - Present
- Country: Republic of India
- Branch: Indian Air Force
- Garrison/HQ: Suratgarh AFS
- Nickname: Kirpans
- Mottos: Sarvottam Seva Sarvarthe; Committed to Excellence

Commanders
- Current commander: Wg Cdr Arvind Repswal

Aircraft flown
- Attack: Mil Mi-17V5

No. 155 Helicopter Unit is a helicopter unit equipped with Mil Mi-17V5. It is based at Suratgarh Air Force Station.

== History ==
The unit 155 HU of Indian Air Force was the first unit to be inducted with the state of the art Medium Lift Multi-role Helicopters of the Russian Origin, the Mighty Mi17V5s. The unit was raised in AFS Bhisiana, Bathinda in the year 2011 and later shifted to AFS Suratgarh in the year 2013.

Since its inception 155 HU has been at the forefront of military operations throughout the western border, air maintenance in the Uttar Bharat Hills region, joint exercises with Indian Army and Armies of foreign nations as well as countless Humanitarian Assistance and Disaster Relief Operations in its Area Of Responsibility.

=== Assignments ===
One of the most important tasks of the unit is the flag trooping at Republic Day and Air Force Day in the national capital as well as wherever the Indian Government deems it necessary. The helicopters fly at low heights and at low speeds maintaining a tight Inverted Wine Glass Formation, typically in reduced visibility conditions.

Joint exercises with friendly foreign nation Armies like the US Army, Afghan Army etc. has proved to be instrumental in building up of tactics and coordination between various elements of the war.

=== Aircraft ===
- Mil Mi-17V5
