= No. 105 Helicopter Unit, IAF =

No. 105 Helicopter Unit
- Active: 23 November 1959 – present
- Country: Republic of India
- Branch: Indian Air Force
- Nickname: "Daring Eagles"
- Mottos: Apatsu Mitram; A friend in time of need

No. 105 Helicopter Unit, (also known as "The Darling Eagles") is a Helicopter Unit of the Indian Air Force.

== History ==
105 Helicopter Unit, also known as "The Daring Eagles", is the second oldest helicopter unit of the Indian Air Force (IAF). It was officially raised on 23 November 1959 in Jorhat, Assam, originally exclusively including Bell 47G helicopters. The unit was led by its first commanding officer, Flt Lt M S Kapoor, who laid the foundation for its future achievements.

From its inception, the 105 Helicopter Unit played a vital role in the development of rotary-wing operations in India. The unit's initial role was focused on providing reconnaissance and transport support in remote and challenging areas. The 1962 Indo-China conflict marked a crucial chapter for the unit, as it was tasked with covering the entire border along Bhutan and Burma. The courage and bravery shown during these operations earned the unit significant accolades, including the prestigious Vir Chakra and Vayu Sena Medal for its role in safeguarding India's northeastern borders.

In 1963, the unit moved to Chabua and was re-equipped with MI-4 helicopters, further enhancing its operational capabilities. The MI-4 helicopters were used for a wide range of operations, from troop transport to logistical support in difficult terrains. During this period, the unit grew in capability, adapting to new challenges and expanding its operational roles.

One of the most defining moments for the 105 Helicopter Unit came during the Indo-Pak War of 1971. The unit carried out bold and daring operations, which were crucial to the success of Indian military efforts. The unit airlifted over 6,000 troops and 179,160 kilograms of military hardware in and around the hostile territory of Dacca (now Dhaka), significantly contributing to the success of Indian forces in the eastern theater of the war. For this valiant effort, the unit was awarded the Vir Chakra and Vayu Sena Medal. During the same period, the unit played a key role in humanitarian operations..

In 1981, the 105 Helicopter Unit transitioned to the MI-8 helicopters, which provided improved capacity, range, and operational flexibility. This change allowed the unit to continue expanding its role in the Indian Air Force. In the same year, a significant change occurred when the unit's name was changed from “Hill Hoppers” to “Hunting Eagles” reflecting its evolving role and growing reputation. A few years later, in 1984, the unit was renamed to “Daring Eagles”. The 1980s saw the unit achieve significant milestones, such as being the first helicopter unit to fire Rocket Pods (RPs) and drop bombs at the DK range in Kalaikunda, West Bengal in 1986. The unit also played an instrumental role during Operation Pawan (1987).

The Daring Eagles also made important contributions towards humanitarian operations, including the earthquake relief in Matli and Harsil in 1991, where the unit set a record by performing 21 sorties and rescuing 255 people in a single day. This remarkable achievement brought the unit close to potential Guinness World Record recognition. The Daring Eagles continued their legacy of service with significant operations in the 1990s. In 1992, the unit participated in a mercy mission to Kathmandu for the rescue of survivors of the Thai Airways crash. The 105 Helicopter Unit also took part in crucial flood relief operations across various regions, including Bihar and Uttar Pradesh. In 1993, during devastating floods in Bihar, the unit airlifted 80 tons of food and medicines and carried out relief operations that saved countless lives. In 1997, the unit was awarded the Best MI-8 Aircrew Trophy during Ex-Ranvijay at Jodhpur.

The Daring Eagles continued to maintain operational excellence in the 2000s. They participated in the Republic Day fly pasts of 2001, 2002, and 2003, showcasing their elite status within the IAF. In 2004, the unit carried out a fly-past at Chakeri for the President's Color Presentation. It also contributed to the nation's disaster response efforts, participating in Tsunami relief operations in Ex-Car Nicobar.

In 2010, the unit transitioned to MI-17 helicopters. From 2011 till 2022, the 105 Helicopter Unit was actively involved in counter-insurgency operations as part of anti-Naxal operations codenamed "Op Triveni." The unit operated in Naxal-infested areas of Jharkhand, Bihar, and Chhattisgarh for over a decade, conducting casualty evacuations, troop insertions and extractions, and providing logistical support to the Anti-Naxal Task Force. The unit's operational involvement in maintaining peace and order in these high-risk areas further demonstrated the unit's versatility and commitment to national security.

In 2022, the 105 Helicopter Unit moved to the Western sector, where it began operating in the challenging desert terrain, contributing to operations and collaborating with the Indian Army. The unit's current operations continue to emphasize its role in national security, as well as disaster response.
