= The Battle of Ayodhya =

- Written by: Vaibhav Bajpai
- Directed by: Kushal Srivastava
- Starring: Ravi Shankar Prasad, Vinay Katiyar, KK Muhammed, Rahul Srivastava, Ranjana Agnihotri, Iqbal Ansari and Acharya Satyendra Das
- Music by: Sanjoy Chowdhury

Production
- Producer: Sarit Aggarwal & Kushal Srivastava
- Cinematography: Raakesh Rawat

Original release
- Release: 20 January 2024

The Battle of Ayodhya is an Indian television documentary miniseries directed by Kushal Srivastava and produced by Sarit Aggarwal and Kushal Srivastava. The documentary is based on Ayodhya dispute. It stars Ravi Shankar Prashad, Vinay Katiyar, Rahul Srivastava, Ranjana Agnihotri, Iqbal Ansari, Acharya Satyendra Das and KK Muhammed. It was officially released on 20 January 2024.

== Cast ==
- Ravi Shankar Prasad
- Rahul Shrivastava
- Vinay Katiyar
- Ranjana Agnihotri
- Iqbal Ansari
- Acharya Satyendra Das
- KK Muhammed

== Production ==
It is made under the banner of Flying Dreams Entertainment. It is shot in Ayodhya, Lucknow, Delhi and Mumbai.

== Episodes ==
The documentary has 5 episodes.

No.	Title	Directed by	Original release date
1	"The Foundation"	Kushal Srivastava	20 January 2024
2	"Next Friend"	Kushal Srivastava	20 January 2024
3	"The D-Day"	Kushal Srivastava	20 January 2024
4	"The Level Battle"	Kushal Srivastava	20 January 2024
5	"Unearthing the truth"	Kushal Srivastava	20 January 2024
