= No. 5 Squadron IAF =

No. 5 Squadron Tuskers
- Insignia of the No. 5 Squadron "Tuskers"
- Active: 2 November 1948
- Country: Republic of India
- Branch: Indian Air Force
- Role: Precision Strike
- Base: Suratgarh Air Force Station
- Nickname: Tuskers
- Mottos: शक्ति विजयते (Shakti Vijayate); Strength is Victory

Aircraft flown
- Attack: SEPECAT Jaguar IS

No. 5 Squadron also known as The Tuskers Squadron nicknamed Tuskers is a fighter squadron and is equipped with Jaguar IS and based at Suratgarh Air Force Station under the Western Air Command.

== History ==
The squadron has retained – and discharged – a primarily offensive operational role for the Indian Air Force, in the half-century since its inception in 1948. It also participated in the Congo Crisis, supporting UN peacekeeping troops.

== Aircraft ==
Aircraft	From	To	Air Base
Consolidated B-24 Liberator	November 1948	February 1957	AFS Pune
English Electric Canberra B(I).58	June 1957	March 1981	AFS Agra
SEPECAT Jaguar 1S	August 1981	—N/a	AFS Ambala
SEPECAT Jaguar 1S	—N/a	Present	Suratgarh AFS
