= No. 17 Squadron IAF =

Indian Air Force squadron

No. 17 Squadron Golden Arrows
- Insignia of The No. 17 Squadron IAF "Golden Arrows"
- Country: India
- Allegiance: Indian Armed Forces
- Branch: Indian Air Force
- Role: Fighter
- Garrison/HQ: Ambala Air Force Station Vasdar air force station
- Nickname: "The Golden Arrows"
- Mottos: उद्याम अजस्रम् (Arise Forever)

Commanders
- Commanding Officer: Group Captain Amit Gehani

Aircraft flown
- Fighter: Dassault Rafale

No. 17 Squadron also known as The Golden Arrows Squadron nicknamed as The Golden Arrows is a squadron of the Indian Air Force stationed at the Ambala Air Force Station as part of the Western Air Command. The squadron was number-plated in 2016, but was resurrected in Ambala on 11 September 2019 with the Dassault Rafale.

== History ==
Formed in October 1951 at Adampur under the command of Flight Lieutenant D.L. Springett, No. 17 Squadron was the last of four squadrons raised in rapid succession as part of the IAF's emergency response to rising regional tensions. Initially equipped with Harvard aircraft, it later transitioned to Vampires.

Hawker Hunters from the Squadron participated in Operation Vijay in 1961. Six Hunters of No.17 Sqn led by the CO, Sqn. Ldr. Jayawant Singh took off from Sambra and attacked the Wireless station at Bambolim with a mixture of rockets and cannon fire.

It was moved from the East to Delhi during the 1965 Indo-Pakistani War to provide air cover for the capital.

During the 1971 Indo-Pakistani War, under the command of Wing Commander Narinder Chatrath, No. 17 Squadron conducted a significant attack on the Kurmitola airbase near Dhaka. In this mission, Chatrath engaged two Pakistan Air Force Sabres, successfully shooting down one. For his leadership and bravery, he was awarded the Vir Chakra.

It was awarded its President's Standard on 8 November 1988 at Palam.

In 1999, the squadron participated in the Kargil War under Operation Safed Sagar, the code name of the Indian Air Force's operations in the conflict. Sqn Ldr Ajay Ahuja of the squadron was posthumously awarded the Vir Chakra for bravery for his role in the conflict.

Currently based at Ambala and equipped with India's first squadron of Dassault Rafale, the squadron has participated in the 2025 India Pakistan conflict.

== Affiliation with the Indian Army ==
On 4 October 2021, the Squadron's affiliation with the Indian Army's Sikh Light Infantry regiment was formally signed at the Ambala Air Force Station.

The Indian Army Chief M. M. Naravane and Air Commodore Tarun Chaudhry of 17 Squadron signed the charter of affiliation.

== Aircraft ==
Aircraft types operated by the squadron:

Aircraft type	From	To	Air base
Harvard-II B	1 October 1951	October 1955	Ambala AFS
de Havilland Vampire	November 1955	1957	Ambala AFS
Hawker Hunter	1957	1975	Ambala AFS
MiG-21	1975	2016	Bathinda AFS
Dassault Rafale	21 September 2019	Present	Ambala AFS

== In popular media ==
The Netflix series named Operation Safed Sagar, released in August 2026 was based on the 1999 Kargil war, and the role of the 'Golden Arrows' squadron in particular. The series is dedicated to Sqn Ldr Ajay Ahuja (played in this series by Siddharth) who was flight commander of 17 Squadron, Golden Arrows. Wing commander Birender Singh Dhanoa (played in this series by Jimmy Sheirgill) was the Squadron Commander who later became the Air Chief Marshal of the Indian Air Force. The show is produced by Kushal Srivastava.
