= Krishnan Narayan Nair =

Air Marshal Krishnan Narayan Nair was the former Commander-in Chief of the Eastern Air Command, Indian Air Force. He was commissioned on 19 December 1961. He received Ati Vishisht Seva Medal on 26 January 1995 and Param Vishisht Seva Medal on 26 January 1998.
