= No. 59 Squadron IAF =

No. 59 Squadron IAF Hornbills
- Crest of The No. 59 Squadron IAF "Hornbills"
- Active: 14 February 1960 - Present
- Country: Republic of India
- Allegiance: Indian Armed Forces
- Branch: Indian Air Force
- Role: Transport
- Garrison/HQ: AFS Gauhati
- Nickname: "Hornbills"
- Mottos: Nishta Dhairya Parisramah; Loyalty Boldness and Hard work

Aircraft flown
- Transport: HS-748

No. 59 Squadron IAF nicknamed as Hornbills is located at Gauhati under Eastern Air Command. The Squadron participates in operations involving air, land and airdrop of troops, equipment, supplies, and support or augment special operations forces, when appropriate.

== History ==
The No. 59 Squadron were raised in 1958 with DHC-3 Otter Aircraft at Jorhat and moved to the present location. The Otters of the 59 Squadron carried out risky landings on unpaved surfaces and inducted the entire 11 Infantry Brigade to the Walong garrison from Tezu during the 1962 India-China War.

=== Lineage ===
- Constituted as No. 59 Squadron (Hornbills) on 14 February 1960

=== Assignments ===
- 1962 India-China War
- Indo-Pakistani War of 1965
- Indo-Pakistani War of 1971

=== Aircraft ===
- DHC-3 Otter
- HS-748
