= No. 127 Helicopter Unit IAF =

No. 127 Helicopter Unit
- Active: 10 January 1985 – present
- Country: Republic of India
- Branch: Indian Air Force
- Garrison/HQ: Mohanbari AFS
- Nickname: "First Ranas"
- Mottos: ? Undaunted Undettered

Aircraft flown
- Attack: Mil Mi-17

No. 127 Helicopter Unit (First Ranas) is a Helicopter Unit and is equipped with Mil Mi-17 and based at Mohanbari AFS.

== History ==
No. 127 Helicopter Unit was raised on 10 January 1985 at Hindon AFS.It was the first unit to be equipped with Mi-17, or 'Rana' as it is called in the Indian Air Force. Hence the squadron motto. Initially the unit was tasked with providing communications and logistics support in the Himalayas. On 21 August 1987 the unit moved to Chabua in the east and from there they moved to Mohanbari in June 1992.

=== Assignments ===
On occasions they have also been called upon to perform VIP duties for Eastern Air Command and have also been required to provide search and rescue coverage for fighters operating in the area. This unit has a dedicated wartime role as well, which involves the induction of troops behind enemy lines.

The unit has actively participated in the following:

- Operation Vijay (1999) in Kargil during 1999.
- Operation Rhino against ULFA Terrorist Camps in Bhutan during September 1991.
- Operation Pawan, the Battle for Jafna in Sri Lanka during October 1987.
- Operation Rakshak, a counter insurgency operation in Kashmir during 2000.
- Operation Meghdoot, the operation to take the high ground on the Siachen Glacier in 1985.
- Operation Brasstacks, the entire mobilisation of the Indian Army in Rajasthan in 1987.
- Operation Safed Sagar in Kargil during 1999.

=== Aircraft ===
- Mil Mi-17
