= No. 107 Helicopter Unit, IAF =

No. 107 Helicopter Unit
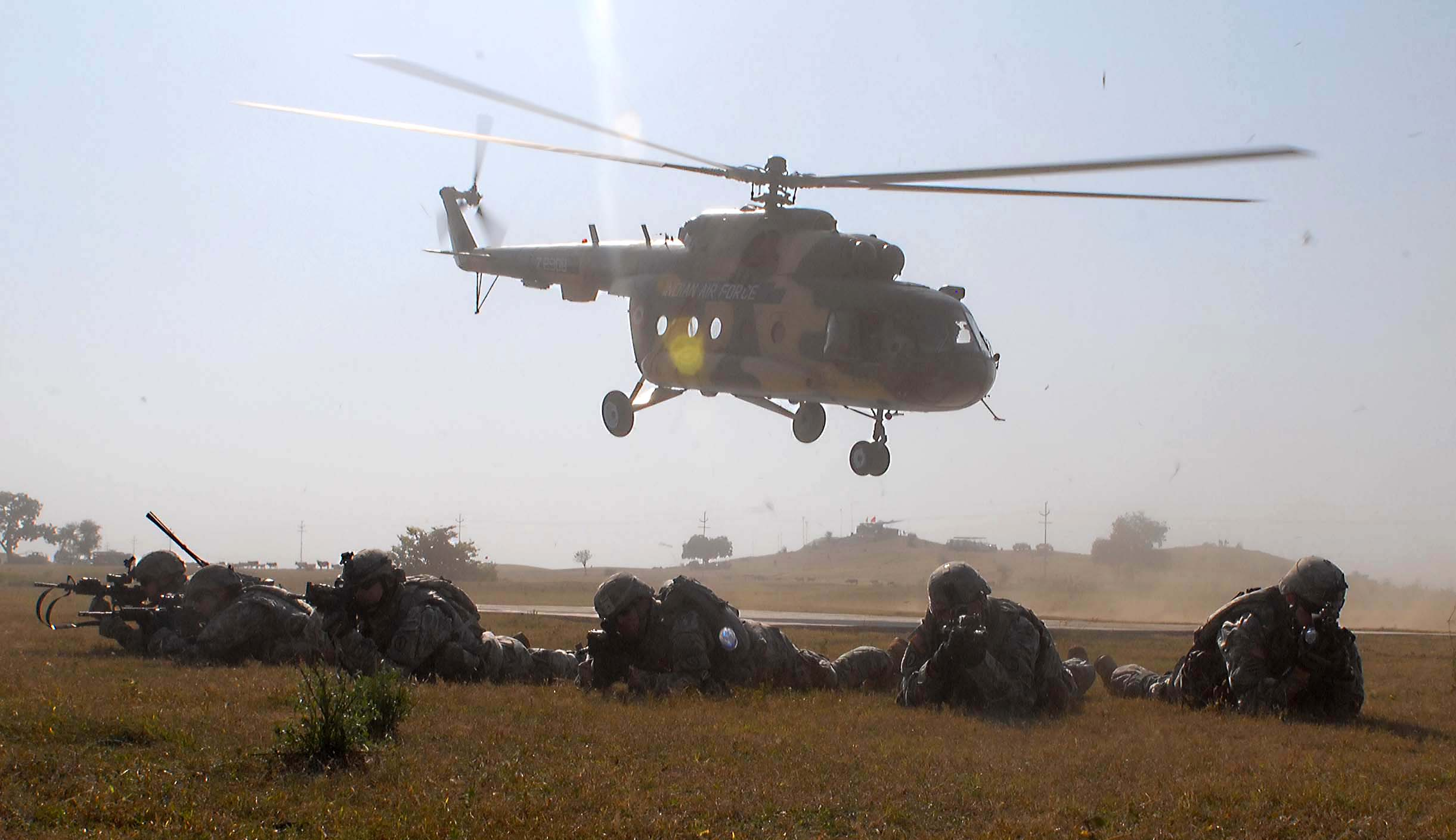
- M17 helicopter flown by the 107th Indian Army Aviation Helicopter Unit during Exercise Yudh Abyas 09
- Active: 1 January 1960 – present
- Country: Republic of India
- Branch: Indian Air Force
- Part of: South Western Air Command
- Garrison/HQ: Jodhpur
- Nickname: "Desert Hawks"
- Mottos: Apatsu Mitram; A friend in time of need

Aircraft flown
- Attack: Mil Mi-17

No. 107 Helicopter Unit (Desert Hawks) is a Helicopter Unit and is equipped with Mil Mi-17.

== History ==
=== Assignments ===
- Operation Pawan

=== Aircraft ===
- S-62
- Mi-8/8T
