= No. 118 Helicopter Unit, IAF =

No. 118 Helicopter Unit
- Active: 22 November 1971 – present
- Country: Republic of India
- Branch: Indian Air Force
- Garrison/HQ: Gauhati AFS
- Nickname: "Challengers"
- Mottos: Apatsu Mitram; A friend in time of need

Aircraft flown
- Attack: Mil Mi-8

No. 118 Helicopter Unit (Challengers) is a Helicopter Unit and is equipped with Mil Mi-8 and based at Gauhati AFS in NE India under Eastern Air Command (India).

== History ==
The 118 Helicopter Unit, with 11 Mi-17s provides air maintenance in the form of rations, medicines and service equipment to around seven Advance Landing Grounds.

=== Assignments ===
Helicopters of the unit has been tasked with flood relief operations for parts of the India and of Bhutan. The unit took an active part in IPKF operations in Sri Lanka in 1987. This unit has been providing assistance to civil authorities in North East India, West Bengal, Bihar, and Orissa.

=== Aircraft ===
- Mil Mi-8
