= Operation Safed Sagar (TV series) =

2026 Indian TV series

- Also known as: Operation Safed Sagar: The Untold Story of The Kargil War
- Created by: Kushal Srivastava; Abhijeet Singh Parmar
- Written by: Sandeep Jain; Nikhil Ravi; Barun Kashyap
- Directed by: Oni Sen
- Starring: Jimmy Shergill; Siddharth; Vinay Pathak; Manu Rishi Chadha; Abhay Verma; Harssh A. Singh; Adil Hussain; Barun Sobti
- Theme music composer: Anurag Saikia
- Composers: Anurag Saikia; Amit Trivedi; Siddharth Pandit
- Country of origin: India
- Original language: Hindi
- No. of seasons: 1
- No. of episodes: 6

Production
- Executive producer: Ashwani Mishra
- Producers: Karishma Panvelkar; Mehboob Pal Singh Brar; Sarita Patil; Sanjay Routray
- Cinematography: Satyajit Pande
- Editor: Micky Sharma
- Camera setup: Multi-camera
- Running time: 47-57 minutes
- Production companies: Matchbox Shots; Feel Good Films

Original release
- Network: Netflix
- Release: 7 August 2026

Operation Safed Sagar: The Untold Story of the Kargil War is a 2026 Hindi-language series created by Kushal Srivastava and Abhijeet Singh Parmar and directed by Oni Sen. It stars Jimmy Shergill, Siddharth, Vinay Pathak, Manu Rishi Chadha, Abhay Verma and others. It is based on Operation Safed Sagar, the code name for the Indian Air Force's No. 17 Squadron of the IAF operations during the Kargil War.

== Cast ==
- Siddharth as Squadron leader Ajay Ahuja
- Jimmy Shergill as Wing Commander B S 'Tony' Dhanoa
- Harssh A. Singh as Group captain Arvind Oak
- Abhay Verma as Flying Officer Rajpal Singh Dhaliwal a.k.a. Dhali
- Mihir Ahuja as Flying Officer C.H. Bal Reddy a.k.a. Baldy
- Taaruk Raina as Flight Lieutenant Jitendra Sangwan a.k.a. Sangy
- Arnav Bhasin as Flying Officer Amit Gupta a.k.a. Goofy
- Adil Hussain as Air Marshal Vinod Patney
- Mahesh Manjrekar as Air Chief Marshal Raghavan Deshmukh
- Sanjay Suri as Wing Commander Sandeep Chhabra
- K.C Shankar as Squadron leader Alok Choudhury / "Chou"
- Barun Sobti as Colonel Sartaj Singh
- Aanjjan Srivastav as Prime Minister Atal Bihari Vajpayee
- Anant Mahadevan as Jaswant Singh
- Dia Mirza as Kamalpreet Dhanoa
- Prajakta Koli as Madhavi Reddy
- Amrita Bagchi as Alka Ahuja, Ajay Ahuja's wife
- Vinay Pathak as Nawaz Sharif
- S. M. Zaheer as Muhammad Sharif
- Manu Rishi Chadha as Pervez Musharraf
- Mohan Kapur as Lt. General Aziz Khan
- Chetanya Adib as Lt. General Mahmud Ahmed
- Lalit Parimoo as Sartaj Aziz
- Narendra Sachar as Lt. General Ziauddin Butt
- Danish Husain as Major general Javed Hassan
- Raj Vasudeva as Major general Iftikhar Choudhury
- Pawan Chopra as Major general Tauqir Zia
- Mark Bennington as Bill Clinton

== Production ==
According to Bloomberg, made with a budget of ₹215 crore (US$23 million) the series is Netflix’s biggest productions in India so far. Netflix also hired 200 cast and crew members and 4,000 daily hires for filming that spanned 115 days. More than ₹49 crore (US$5.2 million) was spent for VFX works by 15 India-based VFX studios.

=== Casting ===
Siddharth and Abhay Verma joined the cast in February 2025, alongside Jimmy Sheirgill and Dia Mirza.

=== Filming ===
The shooting were conducted at Nal, Gwalior, Chandigarh and Madh Island in Mumbai. The flying combat missions at high altitudes were shot in Himachal Pradesh, at locations including the Shinku-La Pass, Jispa, Sissu, Rohtang and Drass Army base.

=== Marketing ===
The prologue of series was released by Netflix on 2 November 2025. Netflix released a tralier launch event in July 2026 with the series casts alongside IAF veterans and the families of officers in Mumbai.

On 6 August 2026 Netflix hosted a special screening event of the series at Bharat Mandapam in New Delhi. The event was hosted by Mandira Bedi.

== Release ==
The series premiered on 7 August 2026 on Netflix.

== Episodes ==
No.	Title	Original release date
1	"Peace and War"	7 August 2026
2	"Sada-e-Sarhad"	7 August 2026
3	"Safed Sagar"	7 August 2026
4	"Golden Arrows"	7 August 2026
5	"Bombs Away"	7 August 2026
6	"Line of Control"	7 August 2026

== Critical reception ==
On the review aggregator website Rotten Tomatoes, 92% of 12 critics' reviews are positive, with an average rating of 7.2/10.

Shubhra Gupta for The Indian Express stated in her review "What Operation Safed Sagar does is to go above and beyond, literally: it takes to the skies, showing us the Indian Air Force which pulled off a near-impossible feat, of striking from beyond the clouds through nerdy jugaad." Sukanya Verma from Rediff.com opined "Once Operation Safed Sagar starts rolling its aerial bombing tactics, the complexity of war takes a backseat."

Abhimanyu Mathur for Hindustan Times wrote "The emotional quotient does not hit as hard as it should in a war drama. The loss of a soldier needs to hit the viewer harder. The narrative needs to slow down for a bit longer in that instant." Reviewing for NDTV, Radhika Sharma rated the series 4 out of 5 stars and called "The pacing is perfect." Uday Bhatia Mint wrote "All the jabs and accusations of other war films and series are repeated here, albeit less rabidly: Pakistan tortures POWs, we don’t; their soldiers fight for a salary, ours defend the nation; their commanding officers are uncaring, ours are mentors."

Zinia Bandyopadhyay Firstpost stated "There are no cartoonish villains or exaggerated attempts to manufacture outrage." Abhishek Srivastava of Moneycontrol praised the cast performances and wrote "pread across six episodes, the show keeps viewers invested while also shedding light on the political developments behind the conflict."

Nandini Ramnath for Scroll.in stated "The series could easily have been a film that focused on the thrilling aerial combat missions and left the emotional dredging to other similarly themed projects." Archika Khurana of The Times of India said "The series celebrates courage without excessive chest-thumping and portrays patriotism with dignity rather than propaganda." Shweta Keshri of India Today wrote "One thing important to note is how the series captures the making of a soldier's mind."

Rahul Desai of The Hollywood Reporter India stated "There’s plenty of technical planning and action, but narrative fatigue kicks in because it’s a small-screen show and not a big-screen film. There’s only so much the VFX pieces can do." Shomini Sen of Wion opined "The CGI is not the best and some of the technical terms and jargons force-fed to the layman viewer." Anindita Mukhopadhyay of India TV wrote "A few slow stretches affect the pace." Shreyanka Mazumdar of News18 criticised visual effects and wrote "The biggest disappointment is the visual effects. For a show built around aerial combat and fighter jets, the CGI is surprisingly inconsistent. Some sequences look underwhelming and even unintentionally comical."
