= No. 6 Squadron IAF =

No. 6 Squadron
- Insignia of The No.6 Squadron IAF "Dragons"
- Active: January 1951- Present
- Country: Republic of India
- Branch: Indian Air Force
- Role: Fighter
- Garrison/HQ: Jamnagar Air Force Station
- Nickname: "Dragons"
- Mottos: Sada Satark; Always Alert

Aircraft flown
- Attack: SEPECAT Jaguar IM

No. 6 Squadron also known as The Dragons Squadron nicknamed The Dragons is a fighter squadron and is equipped with Jaguar IM/IS and based at Jamnagar Air Force Station.

== History ==
No. 6 Squadron is one of the ten senior squadrons of the Indian Air Force. Reformed in January 1951, its varied roles have included air-sea rescue, counter-air, fighter-reconnaissance, maritime reconnaissance, maritime strike, target towing and transport.

=== Assignments ===
- Indo-Pakistani War of 1965
- Indo-Pakistani War of 1971

== Aircraft ==
| Aircraft | From | To | Air Base |
Post-Independence (1951–Present)
| Consolidated B-24 Liberator | January 1951 | December 1968 | AFS Pune |
| Super Constellation L-1049G | October 1961 | May 1975 | AFS Pune |
| English Electric Canberra B(I).58 | January 1972 | December 1992 | AFS Pune |
| SEPECAT Jaguar IM | June 1987 | Present | AFS Jamnagar |
