= No. 119 Helicopter Unit, IAF =

No. 119 Helicopter Unit
- Active: 3 March 1972 – present
- Country: Republic of India
- Branch: Indian Air Force
- Garrison/HQ: Jamnagar AFS
- Nickname: "Stallions"
- Mottos: Apatsu Mitram; A friend in time of need

Aircraft flown
- Attack: Mil Mi-17

No. 119 Helicopter Unit (Stallions) is a Helicopter Unit and is equipped with Mil Mi-17 and based at Jamnagar Air Force Station.

== History ==
The unit was raised on 3 March 1972 at Guwahati and has been operating the Mi-8 helicopters, the workhorse for the IAF. The unit was reequipped with Mil Mi-17 helicopters on 19 March 2014.

=== Aircraft ===
- Mil Mi-17
