= No. 159 Helicopter Unit, IAF =

No. 159 Helicopter Unit
- Active: 11 February 2013-Present
- Country: Republic of India
- Branch: Indian Air Force
- Garrison/HQ: Nagpur AFS
- Nickname: Rudraksh
- Mascot: Third eye of Lord Shiva

Commanders
- Current commander: Gp Capt M Arjun

Aircraft flown
- Attack: Mil Mi-17V5

No. 159 Helicopter Unit is a Helicopter Unit and is equipped with Mil Mi-17V5 and based at Nagpur AFS.

== History ==
The unit 159HU christened “Rudraksh” is an Indian Air Force Helicopter unit equipped with the latest state of the art Medium Lift Multirole Assault Russian Helicopter Mi17v5.

This unit was raised in AFS Purnea in the year 2013 but later shifted to AFS Nagpur.

The unit has been instrumental in handling the Central Region of the Republic of India and assists Central and State Govt with various roles whenever needed.

The unit has been at the forefront of air maintenance in the Uttar Bharat Hills and has countless Humanitarian Assistance and Disaster Relief operations in its history.

The name Rudraksh stands for Rudr which is the holy name of the Hindu Deity Lord Shiva and Aksh means his Third Eye so Rudraksh means the third eye of the great Lord Shiva.

=== Aircraft ===
- Mil Mi-17V5
