= No. 104 Helicopter Squadron, IAF =

No. 104 Helicopter Squadron
- Active: 10 March 1954- Present
- Country: Republic of India
- Branch: Indian Air Force
- Garrison/HQ: Suratgarh AFS
- Nickname: "Pioneer Rotarians"
- Mottos: Apatsu Mitram; A friend in time of need

Aircraft flown
- Attack: Mil Mi-35

No. 104 Helicopter Squadron (Pioneer Rotarians) is a fighter squadron and is equipped with Mil Mi-35 and based at Suratgarh Air Force Station.

== History ==
The acquisition of Sikorsky S-55 in 1954 heralded the creation of the first Helicopter Flight within the IAF, and in 1958 become established as the first dedicated Helicopter Unit, No. 104 Helicopter Squadron.

The IAF S-55s were later phased out in 1966 inducting other helicopter types into service, such as the Mil Mi-35 model in 1990.

As of November 2022, the Mi-35s of the Squadron is undergoing complete overhauls in Russia in two batches. The first batch was already in Russia by then while the entire process is to be completed by mid-2023. Overhaul of each batch shall take 6–8 months. The overhaul would increase its service life by 6 years keeping them active beyond this decade.

=== Assignments ===
- Indo-Pakistani War of 1965
- 1971 JVP insurrection
- Indo-Pakistani War of 1971

== Aircraft ==
Aircraft	From	To	Air Base
Sikorsky S-55	10 March 1954	March 1965	Palam AFS
Sikorsky S-55	March 1965	May 1967	Hindan AFS
Sikorsky S-55	May 1967	N/A	Saharanpur AFS
HAL Chetak	N/A	N/A	
Mil Mi-35	April 1990	April 1995	Bhatinda AFS
Mil Mi-35	May 1995	Present	Suratgarh AFS
