= No. 137 Helicopter Squadron IAF =

No.137 HU "Vulcans"
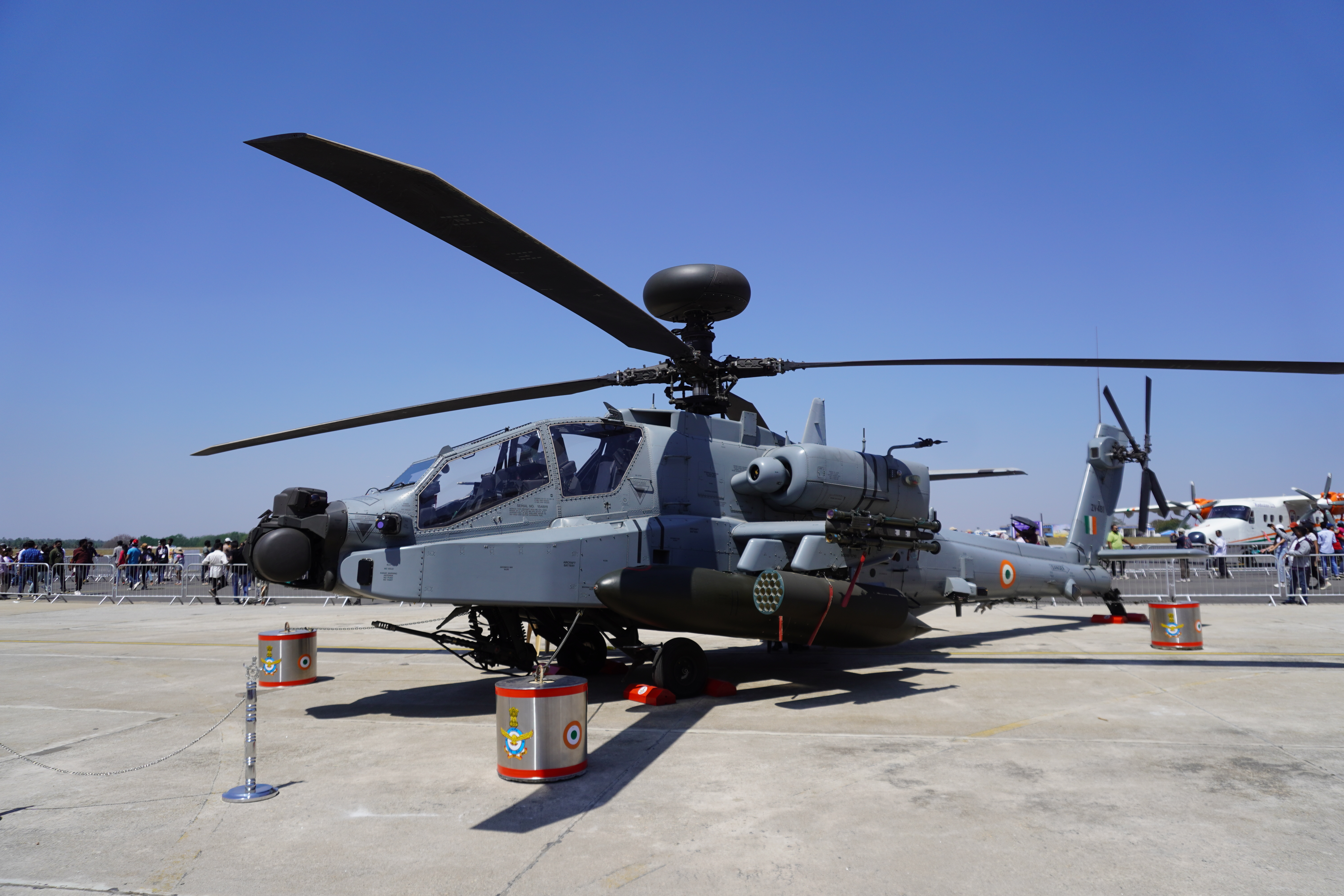
- An IAF Apache in Aero India 2023
- Active: 2019 – present
- Country: India
- Branch: Indian Air Force
- Role: close air support
- Size: 11 helicopters
- Garrison/HQ: Jorhat Air Force Station
- Nickname: "Vulcans"
- Mottos: विनाशाय अग्निः (Sanskrit) "Destruction by fire" (translated)
- Anniversaries: 21 October (Raising day)
- Equipment: AH-64E Apache

The 137 Helicopter Squadron of the Indian Air Force is a helicopter squadron based in Pathankot Airforce Station, operating 11 AH-64E Apache attack helicopters.

== History ==
The squadron was raised on 21 October 2019 after the Indian Air Force received its first batch of eight AH-64E Apache helicopters. Two of these were given to the 125 Helicopter Squadron "Gladiators" and the remaining six to the 137 Helicopter Squadron. From the second batch of eight, three were given to the 137 Helicopter Squadron while the 125 Helicopter Squadron received five. From the third and final batch of five, two were given to the Vulcans and three to the Gladiators.

== Aircraft ==
Aircraft	From	To	Air Base
Boeing Apache AH-64E	21 October 2019	Present	
