= No. 43 Squadron IAF =

No. 43 Squadron Ibexes
- Crest of The No. 43 Squadron "Ibexes"
- Active: 20 January 1958–present
- Country: Republic of India
- Allegiance: Indian Armed Forces
- Branch: Indian Air Force
- Role: Transport
- Garrison/HQ: AFS Jorhat
- Nickname: "Ibexes"
- Mottos: Nabhasa Jeevan Dhara; Life Line from the Sky

Aircraft flown
- Transport: AN-32

No. 43 Squadron IAF nicknamed as Ibexes is a unit of the Indian Air Force assigned to Eastern Air Command. The squadron participates in operations involving air, land and airdrop of troops, equipment, supplies, and support or augment special operations forces, when appropriate.

== History ==
No. 43 Squadron has flown missions in the ladakh Sector during the Sino- Indian conflict of 1962.

On 1 September 1965 the squadron was moved to Ambala from Srinagar, and thereafter to Sarsawa until 1967, after which the squadron was moved to Jorhat. The Ibexes also took part in the 1971 Indo-Pak Conflict, in particular the Tangail Airdrop.

In September 1984 the squadron was equipped with An-32s. In July 1987 the Ibexes swung into action in support of IPKF in Sri Lanka providing logistical support.

In November 1988 the Ibexes took part in the 'Male Operations against mercenaries'.

=== Lineage ===
- Constituted as No. 43 Squadron (Ibexes) on 20 January 1958

=== Assignments ===
- Indo-Pakistani War of 1965
- Indo-Pakistani War of 1971
- Operation Pawan
- Operation Cactus

=== Aircraft ===
- C-47 Dakota
- AN-32
