= No. 125 Helicopter Squadron IAF =

No. 125 Helicopter Squadron
- Active: 1 November 1983- Present
- Country: Republic of India
- Branch: Indian Air Force
- Type: Attack Helicopter
- Role: Close Air Support
- Size: 1 Squadron
- Part of: Western Air Command
- Garrison/HQ: Pathankot Air Force Station
- Nickname: "Gladiators"
- Mottos: Balidaan Veerasya Bhushanam; Sacrifice is jewel of Brave

Aircraft flown
- Attack: Apache AH-64E

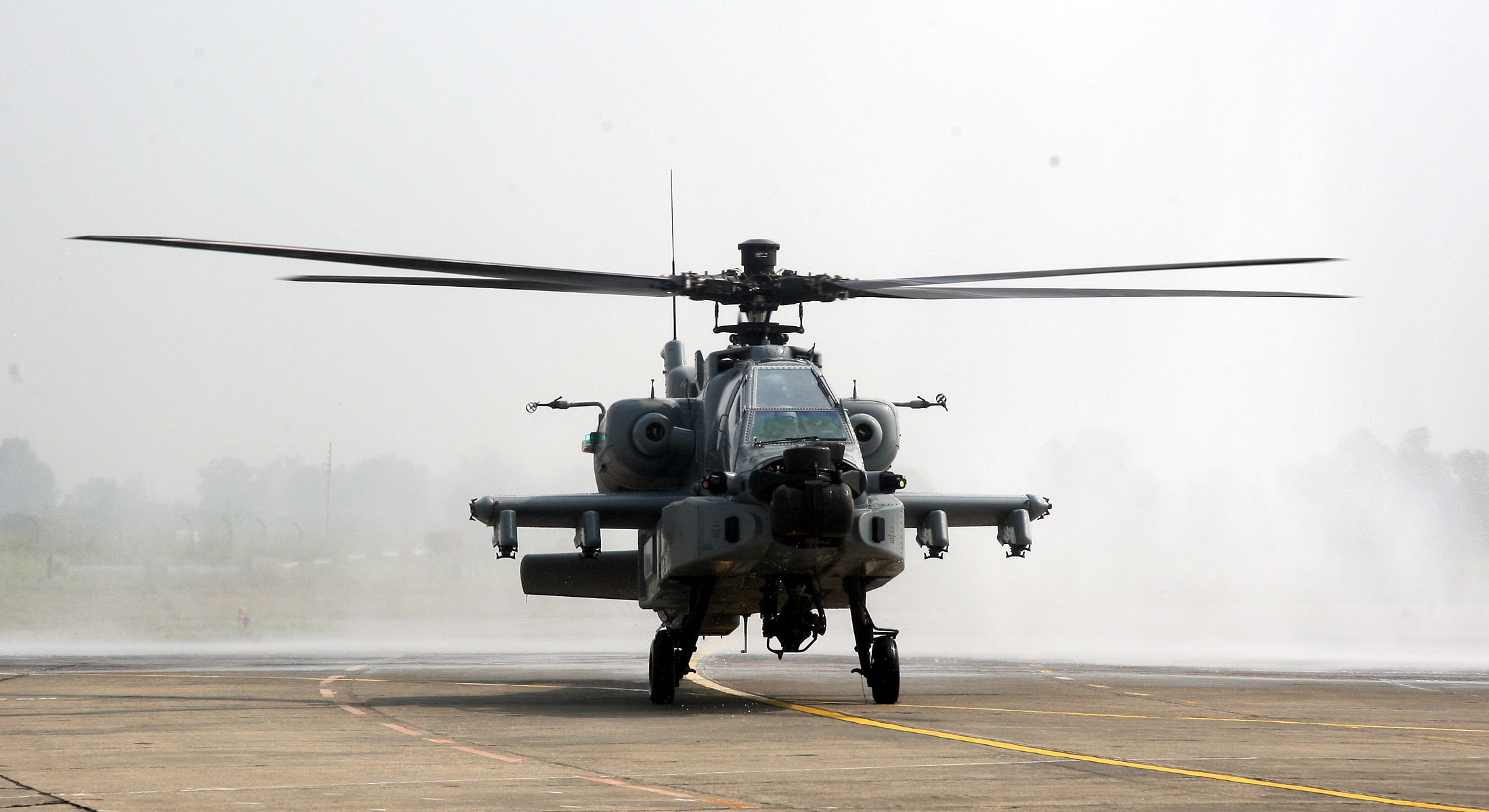
An Apache helicopter on the day of induction into the squadron.

No. 125 Helicopter Squadron (Gladiators) is a helicopter squadron and is equipped with Apache AH-64E and based at Pathankot Air Force Station. It is one of the two helicopter squadrons operating the AH-64E in India with the other being 137 Helicopter Squadron.

== History ==
The first Attack Helicopter Squadron of IAF was raised as 125 Helicopter Squadron on 1 November 1983 and equipped with Mi-25 helicopter Gunships. The squadron was reequipped with Mi-35 in April 1990. On 3 September 2019, the squadron formally inducted the first batch of AH-64E Apache helicopters into the Indian Air Force.

=== Assignments ===
- IPKF Jaffna Operations
- DRC Peacekeeping Mission

== Aircraft ==
Aircraft	From	To	Air Base
Mil Mi-25 U	1 November 1983	May 1990	Pathankot AFS
Mil Mi-35	June 1990	August 2019	Pathankot AFS
Boeing Apache AH-64E	3 September 2019	Present	Pathankot AFS

== Incidents ==
On 3 April 2024, an Apache helicopter of the Indian Air Force made a precautionary landing in Ladakh region during an operational training sortie. The aircraft was damaged during the incident due to the rugged terrain and high altitude conditions. Both the pilots were safe. This marked the first such incident involving an Apache in India. By September, the assembly parts of the helicopter, based in Pathankot Air Force Station, was transported from the landing site North of Khardung La to Leh via road on a truck for further airlift. The aircraft would be repaired either in its home base or a Base Repair Depot in IAF.
