= Vodka Diaries =

- Theatrical release poster
- Directed by: Kushal Srivastava
- Written by: Vaibhav Bajpai; Sachin Vinod Modi; Kushal Srivastava
- Produced by: Vishal Karkera; Vishal Raj; Kushal Srivastava; Atul Pupneja; Vivek Sudhindra Kulshrestha
- Starring: Kay Kay Menon; Raima Sen; Mandira Bedi
- Cinematography: Maneesh Chandra Bhatt
- Edited by: Aalaap Majgavkar
- Music by: Songs: Sandesh Shandilya; Harry Anand; Parvaaz Band; Background Score: Sanjoy Chowdhury
- Production companies: K'Scope Entertainment Pvt. Ltd.; Vishalraj Films and Production Pvt. Ltd.; Flying Dreams Entertainment Pvt Ltd.
- Distributed by: AA Films
- Release date: 19 January 2018
- Country: India
- Language: Hindi
- Box office: ₹ 1.26 crore (US$8,448,300 in 2023 terms)

Vodka Diaries is a 2018 Indian Hindi-language thriller film co-produced and directed by Kushal Srivastava. It is an unacknowledged remake of Shutter Island. Set in contemporary Manali, the story revolves around a club called Vodka Diaries, where a few murders occur; their investigation is undertaken by the protagonist, ACP Ashwini Dixit. The film was produced under the banner of K'Scope Entertainment Pvt.Ltd. and Vishalraj Films & Production Pvt. Ltd. and released on 19 January 2018.

== Plot ==
A series of murders brings ACP Ashwini Dixit (Kay Kay Menon) and his junior colleague, Sub-Inspector Ankit Dayal (Sharib Hashmi) to the club Vodka Diaries in Manali. Three carefree and flirtatious young men are murdered on the same night in the presence of three mysterious women. Vodka Diaries seems to be the centre of the mystery. As the investigation deepens, his wife Shikha(Mandira Bedi), a poet, goes missing. Ashwini tries to unravel the reason behind her disappearance.

However, it is later shown that the victims are alive and well, and no one whom Ashwini had met is now able to recognise him. This puts the detective on a chase, with everyone he knows failing to recognise him or anything that he talks about, and a pursuit of his wife and the killer with anonymous calls and apparent clues appearing to him time and again. Towards the end, it is revealed that Ashwini's real name is Rishi Gautam, a famous writer. On the day of release of his new book, "Redemption of the Murderer", Gautam had quarreled with his wife Shikha, when he saw her with another man named Mayuk (Vikram Sakhalkar). In a fit of rage over her allegations of not spending quality time with her and wrongly suspecting her of infidelity, Gautam had accidentally killed Shikha by throwing a glass bottle at her. He was traumatised and was diagnosed with intensive obsessive identification disorder by psychiatrist Roshni (Raima Sen). Gautam began to hallucinate, believing he was the main protagonist detective of his book, Ashwini Dixit and thinking that Shikha is alive and with him. To treat him effectively, Roshni recreated the entire plot of his novel "Redemption of the Murderer", with the intention of getting Gautam to play the role of Ashwini in his book, with actors around him playing along with him and pretending to be characters of his book, but ultimately leading 'Ashwini' to discover the identity of Gautam Rishi for himself. Eventually Gautam is acquitted by court as Mayuk testifies that the former's act was accidental and not intentional.

In the end, Gautam (alias Ashwini) continues to live and work as a writer in a secluded cottage, with hallucinations of Shikha.

== Cast ==
- Kay Kay Menon as ACP Ashwini Dixit/Rishi Gautam
- Raima Sen as Roshni Banerjee
- Mandira Bedi as Shikha Dixit
- Sharib Hashmi as Sr inspector Ankit Dayal
- Rishi Bhutani as Vivek Rajput
- Herry Tangri as Ronny
- Swati Rajput as Sera
- Vaishnavi Dhanraj As Ananya
- Mohommed Ali Shah as Sam
- Sooraj Thapar as Hotel Manager
- Dipoo Srivastava as Hotel Receptionist
- Rahul Kapoor as Nikhil
- Antara Srivastava as Kavya
- Vikram Sakhalkar as Mayuk
- Mohd Sharia

== Soundtrack ==
Vodka Diaries

Soundtrack album by Parvaaz Band, Sandesh Shandilya & Harry Anand
- Released: 9 February 2018
- Genre: Feature film soundtrack
- Length: 16:14
- Label: Zee Music Company
External audio
- Audio Jukebox on YouTube

The soundtrack of Vodka Diaries has been composed by Parvaaz Band, Sandesh Shandilya and Harry Anand.

Tracklist
No.	Title	Lyrics	Music	Singer(s)	Length
1.	"Beparwah"	Khalid Ahamed and Kashif Iqbal	Parvaaz	Khalid Ahamed	05:44
2.	"Sakhi Ri"	Aalok Shrivastav	Sandesh Shandilya	Ustad Rashid Khan & Rekha Bhardwaj	03:59
3.	"Heeriye"	Harry Anand	Harry Anand	Labh Janjua & Shalmali Kholgade	03:06
4.	"Angoor"	Harry Anand	Harry Anand	Harry Anand	03:25

== Reception ==
=== Critical response ===
Rajeev Masand criticized the film, saying that, "The gorgeous snow laden landscape of Manali is the setting for Vodka Diaries, which starts out as a whodunit, quickly turns into a psychological thriller, before it finally reveals itself to be a waste of time." and gave the film a rating of 1.5 stars out of 5. Lasyapriya Sundaram of The Times of India appreciated the performances of the actors but criticized the poor writing saying that, "What works for the film are the performances by its lead actors. Kay Kay Menon, does the best he can with the material at hand. But even an accomplished performer like him cannot save a film that sounds conceptually good, but is derailed by its poor execution. The film's dialogue writing also leaves much to be desired. While the mystery should be intriguing in a suspense thriller, what remains a mystery is the lack of anything intriguing." and gave the film a rating of 2 stars out of 5. Shubhra Gupta of The Indian Express gave the film a rating of 1.5 stars out of 5 and said that, "On paper, Vodka Diaries, starring Kay Kay Menon, Raima Sen, Mandira Bedi, Sharib Hashmi, may have sounded like an engaging whodunit. But what we see is clearly not." Rohit Vats of Hindustan Times gave the film a rating of 2 stars out of 5 and said that, "Vodka Diaries is about under-utilised actors and losing a promising opening. It probably needed a more thorough approach."

== Awards and nominations ==
- It was selected as Official selection in 9th Jagaran Film festival. Mayank Shekhar was the festival director for the festival who selected the film.
- It was selected as Official Selection in 11th Dada Saheb Phalke Film Festival, Noida in 2021.
- It was nominated at Next Big Thing Film Festival 2018 USA as Best Feature Film category.
