= Ambala Air Force Station =

Air base at Ambala, Haryana, India

Ambala Air Force Station
- Ambala, Haryana in India

Site information
- Type: Military airbase
- Owner: Ministry of Defence
- Operator: Indian Air Force
- Controlled by: Western Air Command

Location
- Shown within Haryana Ambala AFS (India)
- Coordinates: 30°22′15″N 76°49′04″E

Site history
- Built: 1919
- Built by: British Raj
- In use: 1919 - present

Garrison information
- Garrison: 7 Wing
- Occupants: No. 14 Squadron IAF; No. 5 Squadron IAF; No. 17 Squadron IAF

Airfield information
- Identifiers: IATA: AMI, ICAO: VIAM
- Elevation: 275.2 metres (903 ft) AMSL
Runways
| Direction | Length and surface |
|---|---|
| 12/30 | 2,811 metres (9,222 ft) Concrete / Asphalt |
| | 1,770 metres (5,807 ft) Concrete / Asphalt |

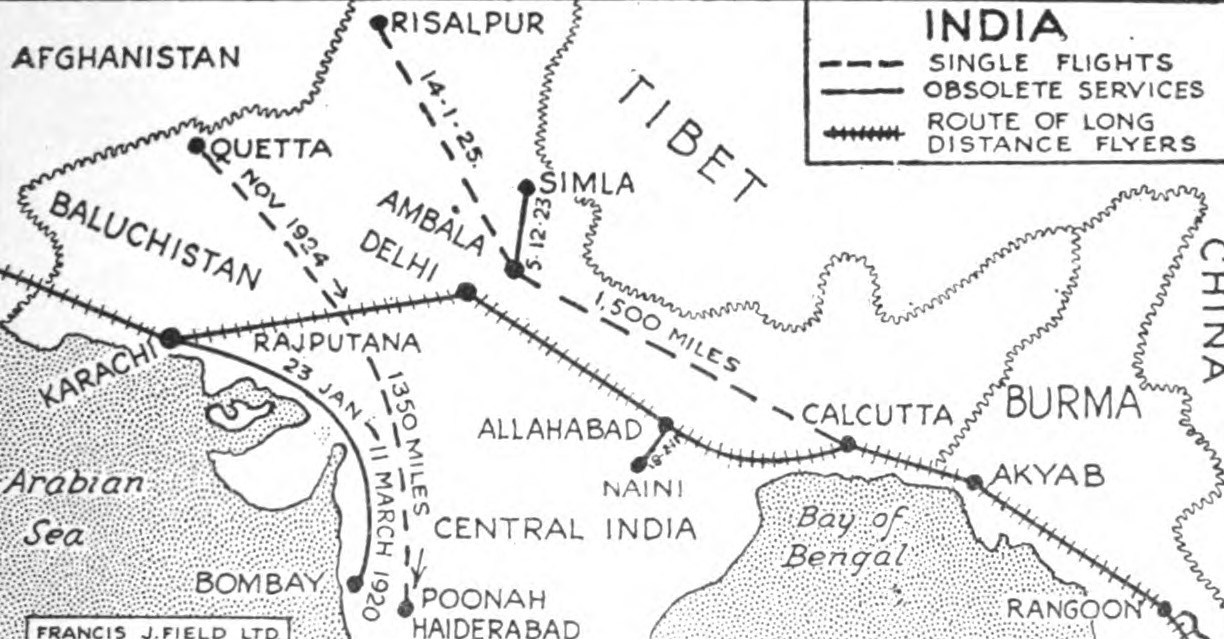
Air routes of British India in 1925, with single fight between Ambala and Risalpur (now in Nowshera District of Khyber-Pakhtunkhwa) on 14 January 2025.

The Ambala Air Force Station (IATA: AMI, ICAO: VIAM) is an Indian Air Force base situated north of the urban Ambala Cantt area in Haryana, India. The Ambala Air Force Station is the home to the first batch of advance multirole fighter jet Dassault Rafales that have been inducted to Indian Air Force.

== History ==
In 1919 immediately after the First World War (1914-18), first airstrip was built in Haryana when RAF Ambala was created and a Flying Instruction School (FIS) was formed here.

On 1 April 1920, No. 28 Squadron RAF which was earlier disbanded in Britain in January 1920, was reformed at RAF Ambala by renumbering 114 Squadron, an army cooperation squadron equipped with the Bristol F2b Fighter. It may have also retained some Royal Aircraft Factory B.E.2s, although if operated, they were soon phased out. The squadron operated over the North-West Frontier, moving to Kohat in December 1921.

On 1st April 1938 just before the Second World War (1939-45), Ambala was approved as the permanent Station Headquarters when some staff from the Drigh Road Karachi Airfield was moved to Ambala, including the Pilot Officers Goyal, Arjan Singh and Prithipal Singh, and in June 1938 two squadrons were moved here, No. 1 Squadron IAF (The Tigers) - the oldest squadron of the Indian Air Force and No. 28 Squadron RAF. Royal Air Force units based at Ambala during British India era included:

- No. 3 Squadron RAF between 1 April and 30 September 1921 without any aircraft
- No. 5 Squadron RAF between 26 October 1922 and 10 March 1924 with the Bristol F.2B Fighter
- No. 20 Squadron RAF between 17 October 1921 and 24 October 1922 with the Bristol F.2B
- No. 28 Squadron RAF between 1 April 1920 and 15 October 1921 with the Bristol F.2B
- No. 31 Squadron RAF between 13 March 1924 and 15 December 1926 with the Bristol F.2B
- No. 60 Squadron RAF between 3 March 1939 and 19 September 1940 with the Bristol Blenheim I
- No. 99 Squadron RAF between 15 June and 26 September 1919 with the Airco DH.9A
- No. 114 Squadron RAF between 2 October 1919 and 1 April 1920 with the Bristol F.2B
- No. 1 (Indian) Service Flying Training School RAF, disbanded 1 April 1946 here.
- No. 659 Squadron RAF between January 1946 and May 1947 with the Taylorcraft Auster V.

On 1 April 1946 1 SFTS, 151 OTU and 1 (Advanced) Flying Unit merged to become the Advanced Flying School (India) at Ambala.

After India's independence in August 1947, Ambala became independent India's first IAF station. In 1947, FIS Ambala was moved to Tambaram near Chennai in Tamil Nadu, at Tambaram Air Force Station.

In both the 1965 and 1971 wars, Ambala Air Force Base was attacked by the Pakistani Air Force. In 1965, the Pakistanis struck Ambala and reportedly destroyed some 25 Indian planes just after they had returned from missions (the PAF did not initially claim any IAF aircraft during the attack on Ambala due to non-availability of damage in night bombing). Indian Air Force rejected the Pakistani claim and stated that no aircraft were lost in Ambala during the war.

On February 26, 2019, for India's 2019 Balakot airstrike in Pakistan, Mirage fighters took off from the Ambala air base, and the whole operation took 30 minutes.

During the COVID-19 pandemic in India in 2020-21, the Russian Ministry of Emergency Situations flew relief supplies from Russia to Ambala.

== Assets ==
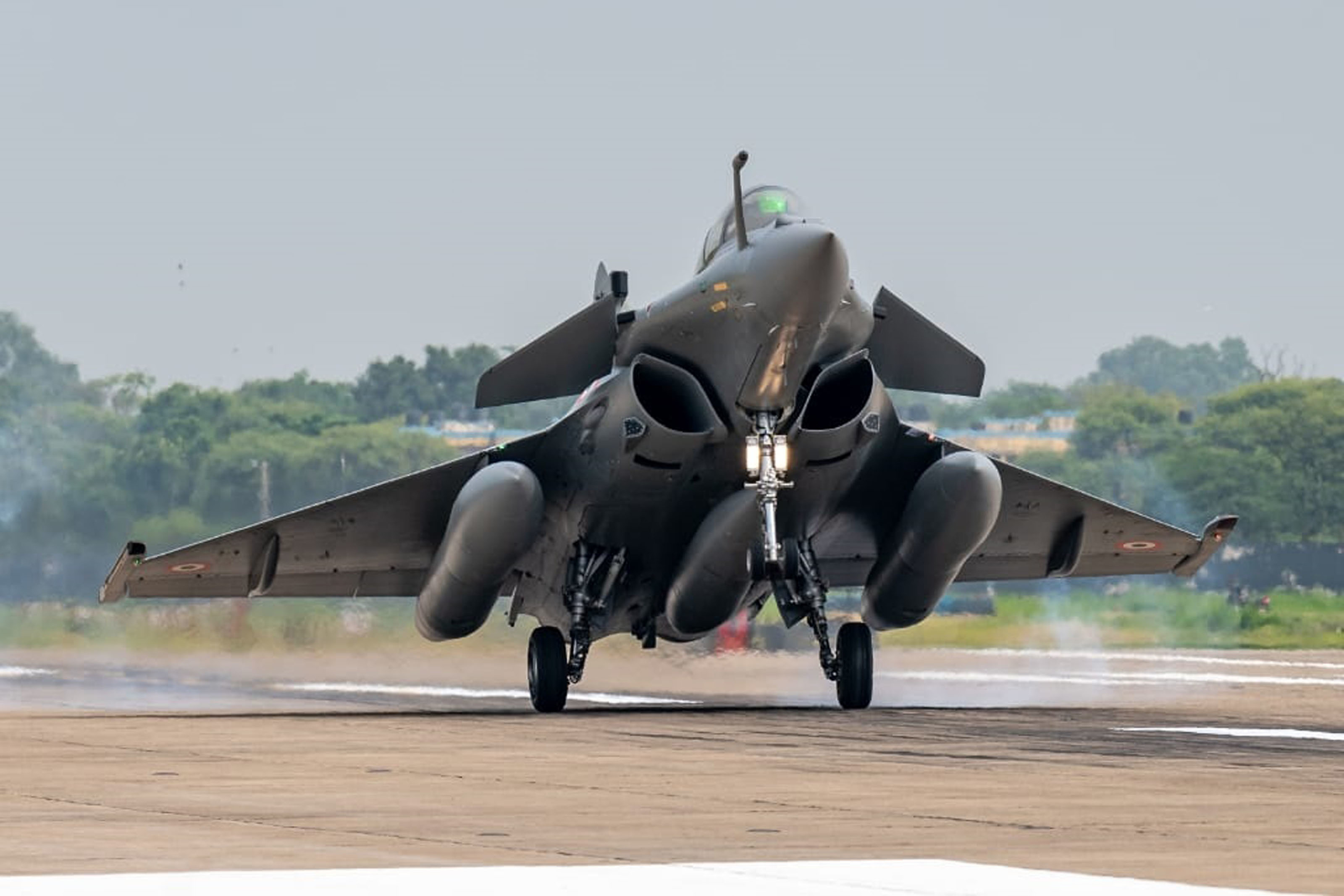
Dassault Rafale landing at the Ambala Air Force Station on 29 July 2020.

In 2018–19, Ambala Airforce station housed a squadron of SEPECAT Jaguar of No. 5 Squadron IAF and No. 14 Squadron IAF, and aging MiG-21bis of No. 21 Squadron IAF (Ankush). In May 2020, the base became the house of the first squadron of Dassault Rafale fighter jets. The second squadron is based at Hasimara Air Force Station.

A dedicated flight training facility and an MRO facility for the Rafale fleet operates out of the airbase.

== Ambala Domestic Airport ==
The foundation stone for the civil enclave at Ambala was laid in October 2023 on a 20-acre site adjacent to the air force station. The project was approved under the Central Government's UDAN 3.0 regional connectivity scheme in December 2018.

The civil enclave is intended to support domestic commercial flight operations from Ambala under the name Ambala Domestic Airport.

== See also ==
- List of airports in India by state
  - Ambala Domestic Airport
  - Airports Authority of India
  - List of busiest airports in India
  - List of Indian Air Force bases
- Military
  - Sirsa Air Force Station, a nearby station in Haryana state
  - Gurugram Air Force Station, a nearby station in Haryana state
  - Raja Nahar Singh Faridabad Air Force Logistics Station, a nearby station in Haryana state
  - Hisar Military Station, a nearby station in Haryana state
  - List of Indian Air Force stations
  - List of Armed Forces Hospitals In India

== Bibliography ==
- Jefford, C. G. (2001). RAF Squadrons. A comprehensive record of the movement and equipment of all RAF squadrons and their antecedents since 1912 (2nd ed.). Shrewsbury, UK: Airlife Publishing. ISBN 1-84037-141-2.
- Halley, James J. (1988). The Squadrons of the Royal Air Force & Commonwealth 1918–1988. Tonbridge, UK: Air-Britain (Historians) Ltd. ISBN 0-85130-164-9.
- Rawlings, J. D. R. (1969). Fighter Squadrons of the R.A.F. and their Aircraft. London: Macdonald & Co., (Publishers) Ltd.
- Rawlings, John D. R. (1982). Coastal, Support and Special Squadrons of the RAF and their Aircraft. London: Jane's Publishing Company Ltd. ISBN 0-7106-0187-5.
