= No. 121 Helicopter Flight, IAF =

No. 121 Helicopter Flight
- Active: ? – present
- Country: Republic of India
- Branch: Indian Air Force
- Garrison/HQ: Santa Cruz AFS
- Nickname: Sea Eagle
- Mottos: Apatsu Mitram; A friend in time of need

Aircraft flown
- Attack: Mil Mi-17 1v

No. 121 Helicopter Flight is a fighter squadron and is equipped with Mil Mi-8 and based at Santa Cruz Air Force Station.

== History ==
=== Aircraft ===
- Mi-17 1vT
