= No. 128 Helicopter Unit, IAF =

No. 128 Helicopter Unit
- Active: 30 December 1985 – present
- Country: Republic of India
- Branch: Indian Air Force
- Garrison/HQ: Mohanbari AFS
- Nickname: "Siachen Tigers"
- Mottos: Apatsu Mitram; A friend in time of need

Aircraft flown
- Attack: Mi-17

No. 128 Helicopter Unit (Siachen Tigers) is a Helicopter Unit and is equipped with Mil Mi-17 and based at Mohanbari Air Force Station.

== History ==
This HU was formed on 30 December 1985 at Hindon Air Force Station became the second unit to operate the Mi-17. From Hindon they moved to Leh in Jammu and Kashmir, where they won the 'Best Helicopter Unit Trophy' in 1986. In March 1988 they moved to Chabua and from there onto their present location in May 1992.

=== Assignments ===
On occasions they have also been called upon to perform VIP duties for Eastern Air Command and have also been required to provide search and rescue coverage for fighters operating in the area. This unit has a dedicated wartime role as well, which involves the induction of troops behind enemy lines.

The unit has actively participated in the following:

- Exercise Hammer Blow in 1987
- Operation Vijay (1999) in Kargil during 1999.
- Operation Rhino against ULFA Terrorist Camps in Bhutan during September 1991.
- Operation Pawan, the Battle for Jafna in Sri Lanka during October 1987.
- Operation Rakshak, a counter insurgency operation in Kashmir during 2000.
- Operation Meghdoot, the operation to take the high ground on the Siachen Glacier in 1985.
- Operation Brasstacks, the entire mobilisation of the Indian Army in Rajasthan in 1987.
- Operation Safed Sagar in Kargil during 1999.

=== Aircraft ===
- Mil Mi-17
