= No. 115 Helicopter Unit, IAF =

No. 115 Helicopter Unit
- Active: 1 April 1967 – present
- Country: Republic of India
- Branch: Indian Air Force
- Garrison/HQ: Tezpur AFS
- Nickname: "Hovering Angels"
- Mottos: Apatsu Mitram; A friend in time of need

Aircraft flown
- Attack: HAL Dhruv

No. 115 Helicopter Unit (Hovering Angels) is a Helicopter Unit and is equipped with HAL Dhruv and based at Tezpur Air Force Station.

== History ==
President of India awarded Standards to 115 Helicopter Unit of Indian Air Force at Tezpur, Assam on 21 November 2014.

=== Assignments ===
The unit took part in Indo-Pakistani war of 1971 and cyclone relief operations in Andhra Pradesh and Odisha in May 1979 and Super Cyclone in 1999.

=== Aircraft ===
- HAL Dhruv
