= No. 111 Helicopter Unit, IAF =

No. 111 Helicopter Unit
- Active: 1 August 1963 – present
- Country: Republic of India
- Branch: Indian Air Force
- Garrison/HQ: Bareilly AFS
- Nickname: "Snow Tigers"
- Mottos: Apatsu Mitram; A friend in time of need

Aircraft flown
- Attack: HAL Dhruv MKIII

No. 111 Helicopter Unit (Snow Tigers) is a Helicopter Unit and is equipped with HAL Dhruv MKIII and based at Bareilly Air Force Station.

== History ==
The unit created a world record for the highest landing by a HAL Cheetah helicopter at an altitude of 23,250 ft.

On 8 February 2012, this Helicopter Unit was re-equipped with the latest HAL Dhruv Mk III variant and became the first unit to operate the variant.

=== Assignments ===
- Indo-Pakistani War of 1965
- Indo-Pakistani War of 1971

=== Aircraft ===
- Mil Mi-4
- HAL Chetak
- HAL Cheetah
- HAL Dhruv MKIII
