= No. 116 Helicopter Unit, IAF =

No. 116 Helicopter Unit
- Active: 27 July 1967 - Present
- Country: Republic of India
- Branch: Indian Air Force
- Garrison/HQ: Jodhpur AFS
- Nickname: "Tankbusters"
- Mottos: Apatsu Mitram; A friend in time of need

Aircraft flown
- Attack: HAL Rudra

No. 116 Helicopter Unit (Tankbusters) is a Helicopter Unit that is equipped with HAL Rudra (the military version of HAL Dhruv Advanced Light Helicopter) and the HAL Chetak, and based at Jodhpur Air Force Station.

== History ==
The 116 Helicopter unit was raised on 27 July 1967 at Sarsawa, and was active with Mil Mi-4 helicopters from 1 August 1967 when it was named "Whirly Wizards". In Dec 1973, the unit was re-equipped with Aérospatiale Alouette III helicopters and was renamed as "Skylarks". It was these that were decorated as "flying elephants" during Republic Day parades. Later, as the first helicopter unit of the IAF to be equipped with AS 11 B1 Anti-tank guided missiles (ATGM), it was renamed to the current Tankbusters name. It was also the first unit to operate the HAL Rudra which it was allocated in 2013.

=== Assignments ===
The air combatants of this unit have undertaken numerous sorties for executing relief and rescue operations in various parts of the country, including being deployed to Sri Lanka as part of Operation Pawan in 1988. The unit has been awarded a Shaurya Chakra, two Vayu Sena Medals, one mention-in-Dispatches and numerous other commendations, including the President's Colour Award on 5 March 2015, and the Chief of Air Staff’s citation, which was awarded on the 89th Air Force Day celebrations on 8 October 2021.

=== Aircraft ===
- HAL Chetak
- HAL Dhruv
- HAL Rudra
