= Phalodi Air Force Station =

- IATA: none; ICAO: VIPX

Summary
- Airport type: Military
- Operator: Indian Air Force
- Location: Phalodi, Rajasthan
- Elevation AMSL: 781 ft / 238 m
- Coordinates: 27°6′22.67″N 72°12′44.5″E

Map
- Location of the airport in Rajasthan Phalodi AFS (India)

Runways
Direction	Length		Surface
Direction	m	ft	Surface
11/29	1,087	3,565	Concrete
- Source: ourairports.com

Phalodi Air Force Station (ICAO: VIPX) of the Indian Air Force is located in Phalodi in Jodhpur, Rajasthan, India.

Good

== History ==
This Air Force Station of the Indian Air Force at Phalodi was commissioned in 2010 and is the sixth Air Force Station in Rajasthan. The base is located about 100 km from the international border with Pakistan. It lies between the Jaisalmer and Jodhpur airbases of the IAF. The base covers an area of 4000 acres and is equipped with sophisticated surveillance equipment and deep penetration aircraft. Phalodi Air Force Station has a runway for the aircraft, aircraft maintenance area, administrative complex, living accommodation for officers as well as other ranks, and all other essential parameters and modern facilities required for an air base station. The base is under the South Western Air Command

== Facilities ==
The airport is situated at an elevation of 554 feet (169 m) above mean sea level. It has one runway with concrete surfaces: 05/23 measuring 3,565 by 55 feet (1,087 x 17 m).

== Units ==
Squadron No. 2415 Air Defence Corps is active with two batteries of Akash SAM System
