= No. 44 Squadron IAF =

No. 44 Squadron Mighty Jets
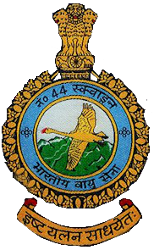
- Crest of The No. 44 Squadron IAF "Mighty Jets"
- Active: April 1961 - Present
- Country: Republic of India
- Allegiance: Indian Armed Forces
- Branch: Indian Air Force
- Role: Transport
- Garrison/HQ: AFS Chandigarh
- Nickname: "Mighty Jets"
- Mottos: Ishtam Yatnen Sadhyetah; Achieve Goals with Perseverance

Aircraft flown
- Transport: IL-76MD

No. 44 Squadron IAF nicknamed as Mighty Jets is a unit of the Indian Air Force assigned to Maintenance Command. The Squadron participates in operations involving air, land and air-drop of troops, equipment, supplies, and support or augment special operations forces, when appropriate.

== History ==
The Squadron undertook extensive air maintenance sorties in the Ladakh and J&K Sectors. This earned the squadron the emblem of "Himalayan Geese" which was formally approved by the then President, Sarvepalli Radhakrishnan on 26 May 1966.

In 1971 Indo-Pak Conflict, the squadron proved its mettle by innovating and effectively employing AN-12s in the bombing role in the Western theatre. Notably, 44 Squadron is the only transport squadron of the Indian Air Force to be conferred the Battle Honours, a feat otherwise reserved for active operational combat units. No. 44 Squadron has flown relief missions to Sri Lanka and Indonesia during the tsunami disaster, rescuing civilians, and to avalanche victims in Kashmir as well SOS missions to quake-affected Iran.

=== Lineage ===
- Constituted as No. 44 Squadron (Mighty Jets) on 6 April 1961
- Designated the emblem of "Himalayan geese" on 26 May 1966

=== Assignments ===
- Indo-Pakistani War of 1965
- Indo-Pakistani War of 1971
- 1988 Maldives coup d'état
- Battle of Jaffna (1995)
- Hurricane Katrina disaster relief
- 2020–2021 China–India skirmishes

=== Aircraft ===
- AN-12 (retired)
- IL-76
