= Kushal Srivastava =

Indian screenwriter

- Born: Pithoragarh, Uttarakhand, India
- Occupations: Film director, producer, creator, showrunner
- Years active: 2015–present
- Known for: Operation Safed Sagar (Creator & Showrunner) Vodka Diaries (Director & producer) The Last Salute (Director)
- Notable work: Participated in Operation Parakram 2002, Indian Air Force
- Relatives: Raju Srivastava - Uncle
- Awards: Recipient of C-in-C Commendation by Air Marshal Surat singh, Indian Air Force (2026) Recipient of Governor Excellence Award, Scroll of Honor by C. V. Ananda Bose (2025)
- Honours: UP Ratan Sammaan 2022

Kushal Srivastava is an Indian film director and producer. He is best known for his projects like Operation Safed Sagar, Vodka Diaries and The Last Salute. He is an Ex Air Warrior who served in the Indian Air Force for seven years as Equipment Assistant in Logistics department.

== Career ==
Srivastava made his directing debut with the film Vodka Diaries featuring Kay Kay Menon, Raima Sen, Mandira Bedi and Sharib Hashmi. His film Vodka Diaries selected in Jagran Film Festival. He also directed short films like Love Birds, Speed Dial, and Kaafir. His short films The Job and Love Birds got nomination in Filmfare Awards.

In 2024, Srivastava directed The Battle of Ayodhya, a documentary series based on the Ayodhya dispute. He later created and developed Operation Safed Sagar, a Netflix series based on the Indian Air Force's role during the Kargil War. The project was initially conceived as a feature film before being developed as a series. Operation Safed Sagar was released on Netflix in 2026.

Srivastava also directed The Last Salute, a documentary centred on the MiG-21 and its retirement from service. The documentary was released on Netflix in 2026.

== Filmography ==
Year	Film	Designation		Notes
2008	Kaafir	Director	Short	
2018	Vodka Diaries	Director	Feature Film	Feature Film - Selected in Jagran Film Festival 2019
2018	The Job	Producer	Short	Nominated in Filmfare Short Film Awards 2019
2020	Love Birds	Director	Short	Nominated in Filmfare Short Film Awards 2021
2022	Speed Dial	Director	Short	
2024	The Battle of Ayodhya	Director	Docu-Series	
2026	Operation Safed Sagar	Creator	Web-Series	Netflix
2026	The Last Salute	Director	Documentary film	Netflix

== Awards and recognitions ==
- Received C-in-C commendation on Republic day (26th January) 2026 by Air Marshal Surat Singh, C-in-C Eastern Air Command.
- Received Governor Excellence Award - Scroll of Honor by Dr C. V. Ananda Bose, Governor of West Bengal in 2025.
- Received UP Ratan Sammaan by Cabinet Minister Smriti Irani in 2022.
- Nominated in Filmfare Short Film Award for The Job featuring Kalki Koechlin in 2019
- Nominated in Filmfare Short Film Awards for Love Birds in 2021
- Nominated in Filmfare Short Film Awards for Maa Ki Kaya in 2023
