= Chabua =

- Town
- Location in Assam, India Chabua (India)
- Coordinates: 27.48°N 95.18°E
- Country: India
- State: Assam
- District: Dibrugarh

Government
  - Body: Town Committee
- Elevation: 106 m (348 ft)

Population (2011)
  - Total: 7,230

Languages
  - Official: Assamese
- Time zone: UTC+5:30 (IST)
- Postal code: 786184
- Vehicle registration: AS 06
- Website: chabua.assamurban.in

Chabua (/tʃəˈbʊə/ or /tʃəˈbwɑː/) is a town and a town area committee in Dibrugarh district in the state of Assam, India. Chabua is situated between Dibrugarh town and Tinsukia town on NH-37. It is 30 and 20 km (19 and 12 mi) from both the district towns, respectively. Its name derives from Chah (tea) and bua (plantation). It is also known as the motherland of tea, because Chabua was the first town in India where tea cultivars were planted.

== Geography ==
Chabua is located at 27.48°N 95.18°E. It has an average elevation of 106 metres (347 feet).

== Demographics ==
As of the 2011 Indian census, Chabua had a population of 7,230. Males constitute 51% of the population and females 49%. Chabua has an average literacy rate of 88%, higher than the national average of 59.5%; with male literacy of 83% and female literacy of 72%. 11% of the population is under 6 years of age.

== Politics ==
Chabua is a Legislative Assembly constituency and a Circle of Dibrugarh District. Chabua is part of Lakhimpur.

== History ==
In the early 1820s, the British East India Company began large-scale production of tea in Assam, India, of a tea variety traditionally brewed by the Singpho tribe. In 1826, the British East India Company took over the region from the Ahom kings through the Yandaboo Treaty. In 1837, the first English tea garden was established at Chabua in Upper Assam; in 1840, the Assam Tea Company began the commercial production of tea in the region, run by indentured servitude of the local inhabitants. Beginning in the 1850s, the tea industry rapidly expanded, consuming vast tracts of land for tea plantations. By the turn of the century, Assam became the leading tea-producing region in the world. The word Chabua consist of two words: chah which means "tea" and bua which means plantation. Later on, Chahbua became Chabua and the place got its name.

During World War II, Chabua Air Force Station was constructed on the outskirts of the town. Chabua airfield was one of the largest bases used by the USAAF Air Transport Command to ferry supplies and personnel across The Hump to China in World War II. Chabua was headquarters for both the Assam and Bengal Wings of the India-China Division, ATC; and the operating base for the flying squadron of the 1333rd AAF Base Unit.

The country's eastern sector bordering China got fortified on 8 March 2011, with the induction of the Sukhoi Su-30MKI fighter aircraft at the Chabua Air Force Station. The initiation was done through a symbolic ceremony with the inaugural flight of the Sukhoi Su-30MKI taking off from here.

== Education and research ==
Chabua has many educational institutions:

University:

- Sri Sri Aniruddhadeva Sports University

Colleges:

- Dakha Devi Rasiwasia College
- Chabua Junior College, Chabua
- Purvajyoti Academy
- Kendriya Vidyalaya A.F.S Chabua

Vocational Training:

- NEEI, Chabua
- Basic Teachers Training Centre

Schools:

- Deodhai L.P. School
- Aniruddhadev M.E. School
- Assam Vidyapith H.S. School
- Jatiya Vidyalay, Chabua
- Little Angel School, Chabua
- Montfort High school, Chabua
- Rashtriya Hindi Vidyalaya HE School, est. 1952
- Bastuhara Vidyalaya H.E School
- Dinjoy H.M.H.S. School
- Paragon M.G Academy, Chabua
- Kendriya vidyalaya A.F.S Chabua

Health & Medical services

- Referral Hospital & Research Centre
- ST. Lukes Hospital
- Rural Health & Training Centre, Chabua, supervised by Assam Medical College
- Model hospital Chabua

== Notable people ==
- Birthplace of Julie Christie, actress (b. 1940) in St. Luke's Hospital, Chabua. Her father was the manager of Singlijan Tea Estate
- Paresh Baruah, Ulfa leader
