= Jamnagar Airport =

Domestic airport in Jamnagar, Gujarat, India

- IATA: JGA; ICAO: VAJM

Summary
- Airport type: Military/Public
- Owner: Indian Air Force
- Operator: Airports Authority of India
- Serves: Jamnagar
- Location: Jamnagar, Gujarat, India
- Time zone: Indian Standard Time (+5:30)
- Elevation AMSL: 69 ft (21 m)
- Coordinates: 22°27′56″N 070°00′45″E
- Website: Jamnagar Airport

Map
- Location within Gujarat Location within India

Runways
Direction	Length		Surface
Direction	ft	m	Surface
06/24	8,242	2,512	Concrete
12/30	8,236	2,510	Asphalt

Statistics (April 2025 – March 2026)
- Passengers: 1,66,490 (▼1.5%)
- Aircraft movements: 3,620 (▲12.9%)
- Cargo tonnage: 139.2 (▼38.7%)
- Source: AAI

Jamnagar Airport, officially known as Civil Enclave Jamnagar, (IATA: JGA, ICAO: VAJM) is a domestic airport and an Indian Air Force base serving the city of Jamnagar, Gujarat, India. It is owned by the Indian Air Force and also permits both commercial as well as private flights. It is the only airport in Gujarat which has two runways.

According to a survey conducted by the Gujarat Infrastructure Development Board, traffic at Jamnagar airport grew at 15% between 2003 and 2008. Compared to other airports in Gujarat, Jamnagar airport has low market share but high growth. The domestic passenger demand would increase by 6% between 2016 and 2020.

During the evacuation of Indian nationals from Yemen in April 2015, a C-17 Globemaster of the Indian Air Force was sent to Djibouti from the Jamnagar Airport.

== Terminal ==
Jamnagar Airport has a single terminal spread over 35 acres. It has a capacity to handle 150 passengers at a given time. It has a small lounge including a cafeteria before the check-in counter. There is a conveyor belt in the arrivals area for the luggage. The parking apron adjoining the terminal measures 295 ft x 295 ft and can handle two Airbus A320s simultaneously. The airport has a car parking capacity of about 50 cars.

In 2012, the government announced plans for the expansion of the terminal along with several other airports of the state.

== Airlines and destinations ==
Airlines	Destinations
Air India	Mumbai
Air India Express	Mumbai
IndiGo	Mumbai, Navi Mumbai
Star Air	Ahmedabad, Surat

== Access ==
The airport is connected to the city by a four-lane highway and is about 8 kilometres from the city. It will also be more accessible with the help of the upcoming Amritsar–Jamnagar Expressway.

== See also ==
- List of airports in Gujarat
