= Suratgarh Air Force Station =

- IATA: none; ICAO: VI43

Summary
- Airport type: Military
- Operator: Indian Air Force
- Location: Suratgarh, Rajasthan
- Elevation AMSL: 554 ft / 169 m
- Coordinates: 29°23′16″N 073°54′14″E

Map
- Location of the airport in Rajasthan Suratgarh AFS (India)

Runways
Direction	Length		Surface
Direction	m	ft	Surface
05/23	2,740	8,990	Concrete
- Source: ourairports.com

Suratgarh Air Force Station (ICAO: VI43) of the Indian Air Force (IAF) is located in Suratgarh Of The Sri Ganganagar Rajasthan, India.

The air force station mainly operates the MiG 21 Bison.

== Facilities ==
The airport is situated at an elevation of 554 feet (169 m) above mean sea level. It has four runway with concrete surfaces: 05/23 measuring 8,990 by 148 feet (2,740 x 45 m).
