= 87th =

87th is the ordinal form of the number 87. 87th or Eighty-seventh may also refer to:

- A fraction, 1/87, equal to one of 87 equal parts

== Geography ==
- 87th meridian east, a line of longitude
- 87th meridian west, a line of longitude
- 87th parallel north, a circle of latitude
- 87th parallel south, a circle of latitude
- 87th Street (disambiguation)

== Military ==
- 87th Brigade (disambiguation)
- 87th Division (disambiguation)
- 87th Regiment (disambiguation)
- 87th Squadron (disambiguation)

== Other ==
- 87th century
- 87th century BC

== See also ==
- 87 (disambiguation)
