= LXXXVII Corps =

LXXXVII Corps or 87th Corps may refer to:

- LXXXVII Army Corps, Wehrmacht, Germany
- 87th Rifle Corps, Soviet Union

== See also ==
- List of military corps by number
- 87th Brigade (disambiguation)
- 87th Division (disambiguation)
- 87th Regiment (disambiguation)
- 87th (disambiguation)
