= 87 Squadron =

87 Squadron or 87th Squadron may refer to:

- No. 87 Squadron IAF, India
- No. 87 Squadron RAF, United Kingdom
- No. 87 Squadron RAAF, Australia
- 87th Squadron (Iraq)
- 87th Aero Squadron, Air Service, United States Army
- 87th Troop Carrier Squadron, United States Army Air Forces
- 87th Fighter-Bomber Squadron, United States Air Force
- 87th Flying Training Squadron, United States Air Force
- VFA-87 (Strike Fighter Squadron 87), United States Navy

== See also ==
- 87th Division (disambiguation)
- 87th Regiment (disambiguation)
