= Air Force Station Arjan Singh =

Indian Air Force Station in West Bengal, India

Air Force Station Arjan Singh

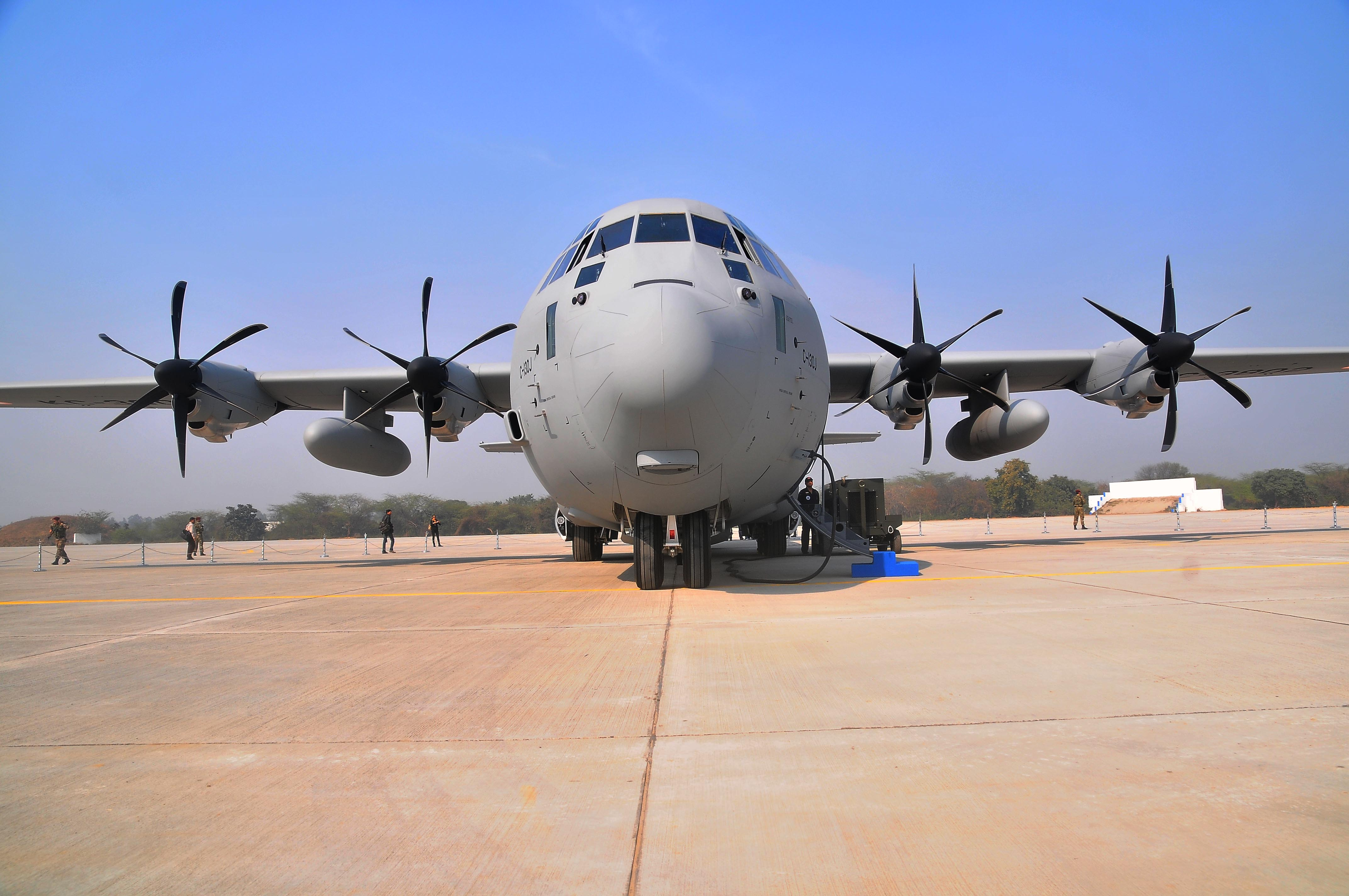
- Indian Air Force C-130J
- IATA: none; ICAO: VEPH

Summary
- Airport type: Military (Indian Air Force)
- Operator: Eastern Air Command
- Serves: Indian Air Force
- Location: Panagarh, West Bengal
- Elevation AMSL: 240 ft / 73 m
- Coordinates: 23°28′28″N 087°25′39″E

Map
- Air Force Station Arjan Singh Air Force Station Arjan Singh (India)

Runways
Direction	Length		Surface
Direction	m	ft	Surface
15/33	2,743	9,000	Concrete / asphalt
- Source: DAFIF

Air Force Station Arjan Singh (ICAO: VEPH), formerly Panagarh Airport, is an airport near Panagarh, a town in the state of West Bengal in India. It is an air force base under Eastern Air Command of Indian Air Force. It is 24 km southeast of Durgapur city.

== Units ==
- No. 87 Squadron (Lockheed C-130J Super Hercules)

..

== History ==
During World War II, the airport was used as a supply transport airfield from 1942 to 1945 by the United States Army Air Forces Tenth Air Force and as a repair and maintenance depot for B-24 Liberator heavy bombers by Air Technical Service Command.

The airport has numerous wartime relics, with abandoned taxiways and a large concrete parking ramp remaining, although not used and in a deteriorating state.

In 2018 the airport was renamed after former chief of air force Arjan Singh.

== Facilities ==
The airport is at an elevation of 73 m (240 ft) above mean sea level. It has one runway designated 15/33 with an asphalt surface measuring 2743 m by 46 m (9000 ft by 150 ft).

The Air Force is also planning to deploy six aerial refueling tanker aircraft at Panagarh Air Station in West Bengal. This will enhance the striking range of fighter planes like Su-30MKIs based in Tezpur and Chabua (both in Assam). Panagarh is also the headquarters of Army's XVII Mountain Strike Corps. AFS Arjan Singh is another training base for Paratroopers. Paratrooper Training School in Agra have already set up their base here to train Special Forces for operations at night, even beyond the country's borders.
