= No. 87 Squadron IAF =

Squadron of Indian Air Force

No. 87 Squadron Raiding Raptors
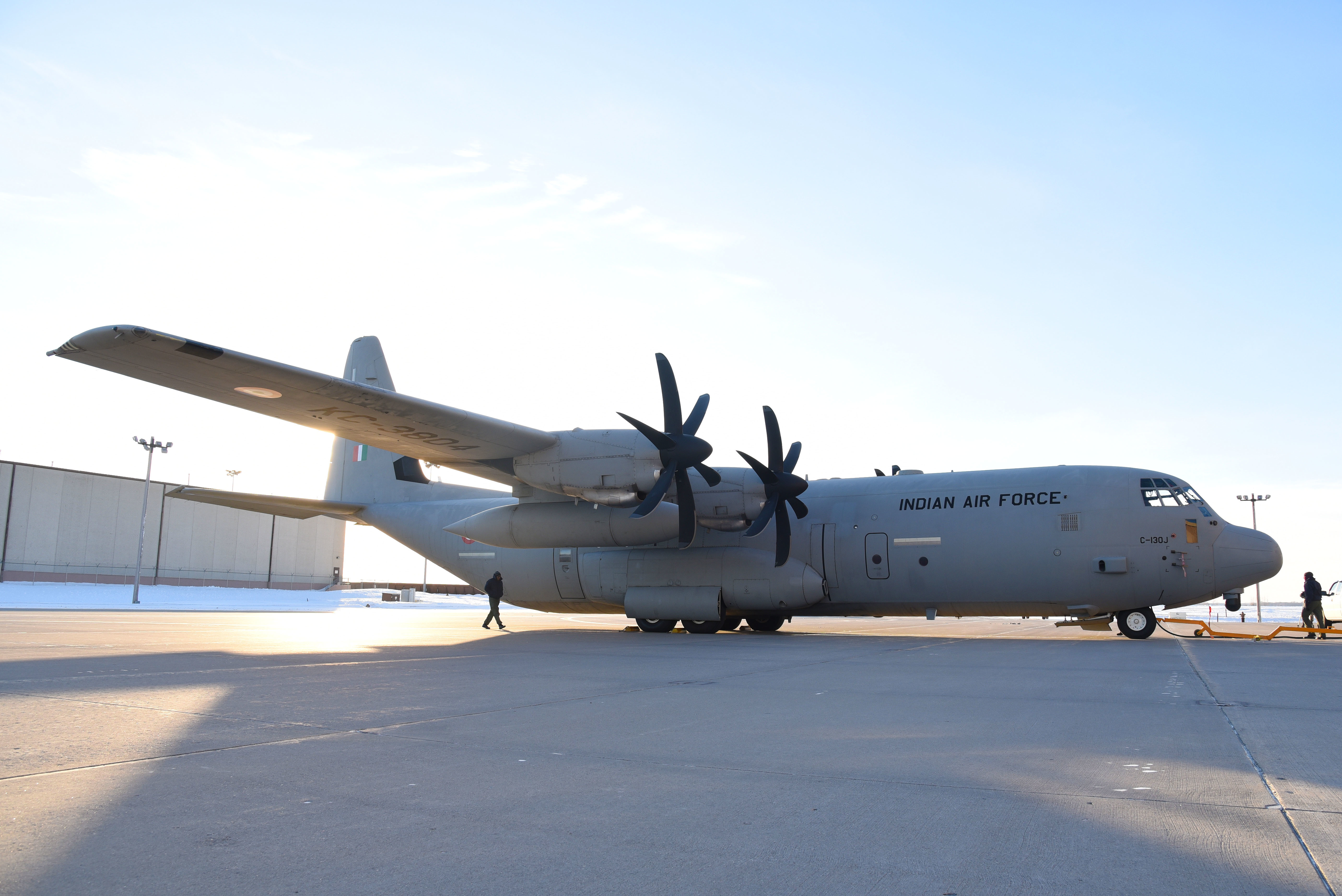
- An Indian Air Force C-130J
- Active: 6 May 2016 - Present
- Country: Republic of India
- Allegiance: Indian Armed Forces
- Branch: Indian Air Force
- Role: Special Air Operations
- Garrison/HQ: Panagarh AFS
- Nickname: "Raiding Raptors"
- Motto: Wings of Valor

Aircraft flown
- Transport: C-130J Super Hercules

No. 87 Squadron of Indian Air Force nicknamed as Raiding Raptors is located at Panagarh Air Force Station and is assigned to Eastern Air Command. The tactical-aircraft squadron is used for special forces and also for Indian Army's new XVII Mountain Strike Corps located at Panagarh.

== History ==
Initially, two C-130Js from No. 77 Squadron, Hindon AFS operated from Panagarh since its inauguration in May 2016, until the new Super Hercules arrived next year. The first two C-130J Super Hercules landed in July 2017. A month later in August 2017, remaining four aircraft arrived at the base with IAF commissioning the air base as Air Force Station Arjan Singh.

=== Lineage ===
- Constituted as No. 87 Squadron on 6 May 2016.

=== Aircraft ===
- C-130J Super Hercules.
