= 87 =

87 may refer to:

- 87 (number), the natural number following 86 and preceding 88
- one of the years 87 BC, AD 87, 1987, 2087
- Atomic number 87, francium
- Intel 8087, a floating-point coprocessor
- 87; Common gasoline rating
- 87 Sylvia, a large asteroid
- Tatra 87, a luxury car
- Finn (Star Wars), also known as FN-2187 ("Eight-Seven"), a fictional character

== See also ==
- 87th (disambiguation)
- List of highways numbered 87
