= 87th Street =

87th Street may refer to:

== In Chicago ==
- 87th Street/South Chicago station, a Metra Electric South Chicago branch station
- 87th Street/Woodruff station, a Metra Electric main line station
- 87th station, a Chicago "L" Red Line station

== Elsewhere ==
- 87th Street (Manhattan), New York City
