= 87th Brigade =

87th Brigade may refer to:

== Spain ==
- 87th Mixed Brigade

== United Kingdom ==
- 87th Armoured Brigade (Dummy Tanks)
- 87th Brigade (United Kingdom)

== United States ==
- 87th Infantry Brigade (United States)

== See also ==
- 87th Division (disambiguation)
- 87th Regiment (disambiguation)
