= 87th Regiment of Foot (disambiguation) =

Three regiments of the British Army have been numbered the 87th Regiment of Foot:

- 87th Regiment of Foot (Keith's Highlanders), a British Army unit raised in 1759 and disbanded in 1763
- 87th Regiment of Foot (1779), a British Army unit raised in 1779 and disbanded in 1783
- 87th (Royal Irish Fusiliers) Regiment of Foot, a British Army unit raised in 1793
