= 87th Squadron (Iraq) =

87th Squadron, Iraqi Air Force
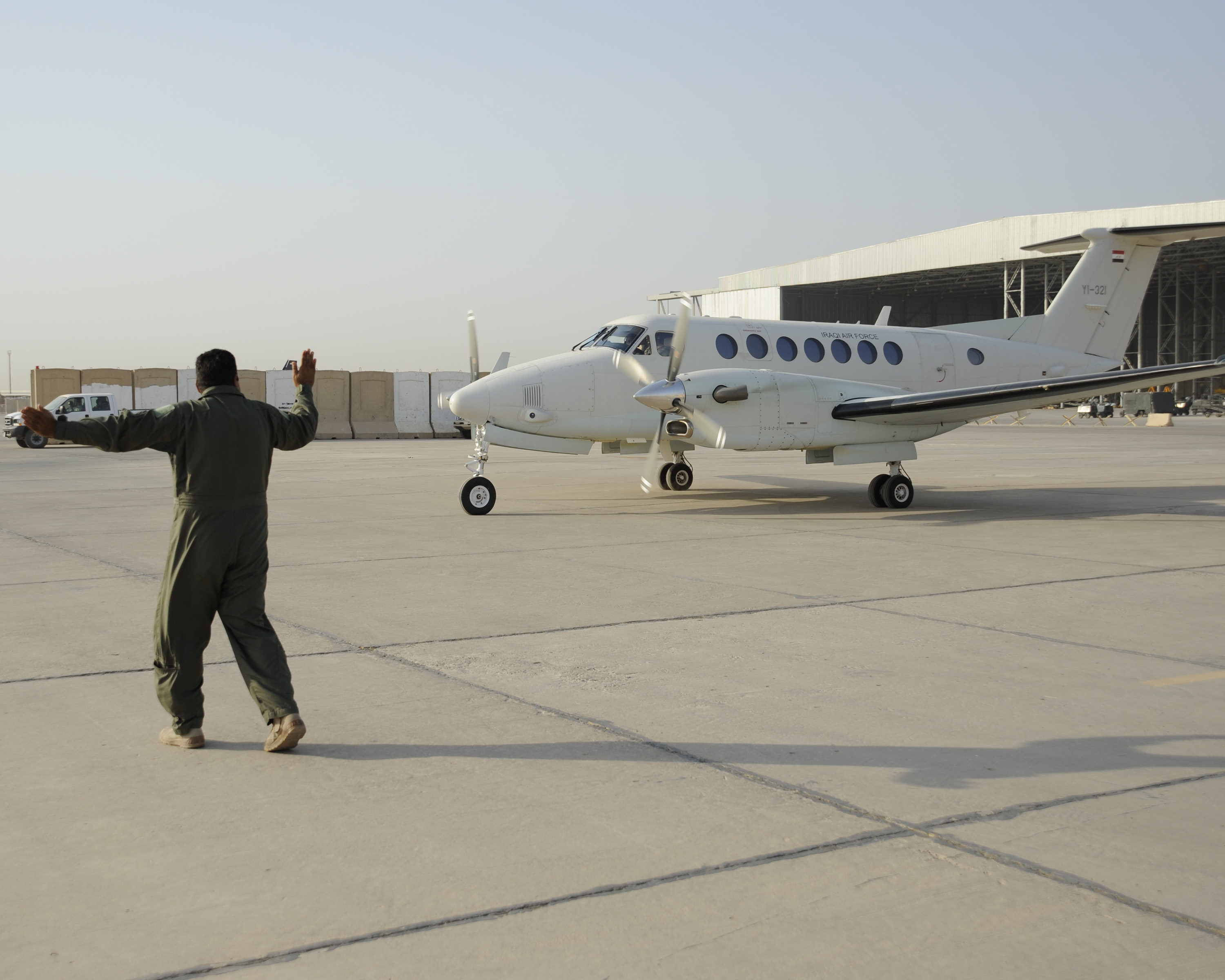
- An Iraqi King Air 350 at New al-Muthana Air Base, Iraq, on September 6, 2008.
- Active: Unknown-current
- Country: Iraq
- Branch: Iraqi Air Force
- Role: Reconnaissance & Transport
- Base: New Al Muthana Air Base (Baghdad International Airport)
- Engagements: War in Iraq (2013–2017)

Insignia
- Fin Flash

Aircraft flown
- Reconnaissance: King Air 350ER
- Transport: King Air 350ER

The 87th Squadron, Iraqi Air Force is a reconnaissance squadron.

The 87th Squadron is based at New Al Muthana Air Base and flies the Beechcraft King Air 350ER. These aircraft were delivered between December 2007 and September 2009, five of them in an ISR configuration and one in a transport configuration.
