= Lockheed Martin C-130J Super Hercules =

Military transport aircraft

C-130J Super Hercules
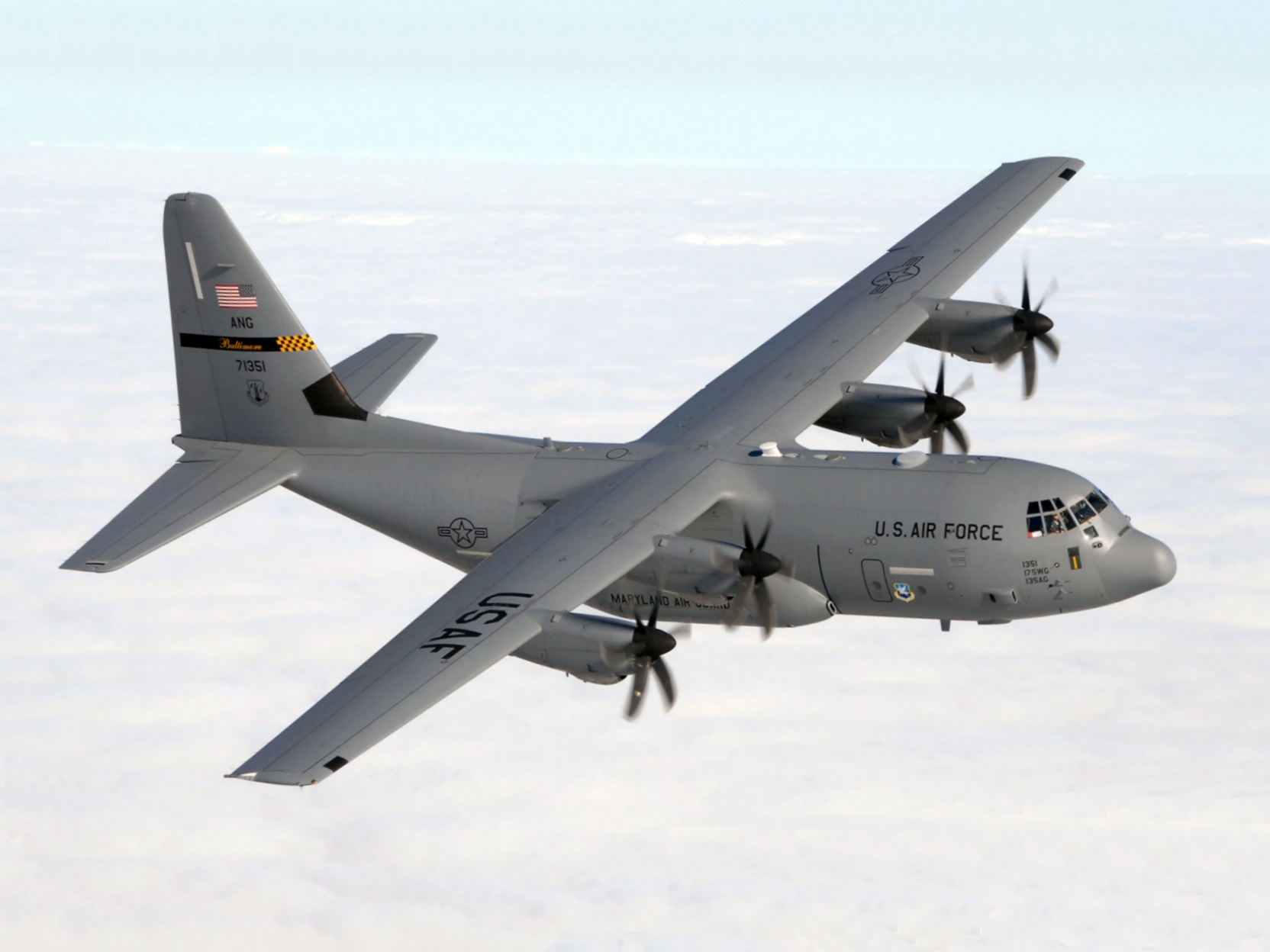
- A U.S. Air Force C-130J

General information
- Type: Military transport, aerial refuelling aircraft
- National origin: United States
- Manufacturer: Lockheed Martin
- Status: In service
- Primary users: United States Air Force United States Marine Corps; See Operators section for others
- Number built: 500 as of March 2022

History
- Manufactured: 1996–present
- Introduction date: 1999
- First flight: 5 April 1996
- Developed from: Lockheed C-130 Hercules
- Variant: Lockheed Martin E-130J

The Lockheed Martin C-130J Super Hercules is a medium-size American four-engine turboprop military transport aircraft. The C-130J is a comprehensive update of the Lockheed C-130 Hercules, with new engines, flight deck, and other systems.

The C-130J is the newest version of the C-130 Hercules, and the only model currently in production. As of March 2022, 500 C-130J aircraft had been delivered to 26 operators in 22 countries.

== Development ==
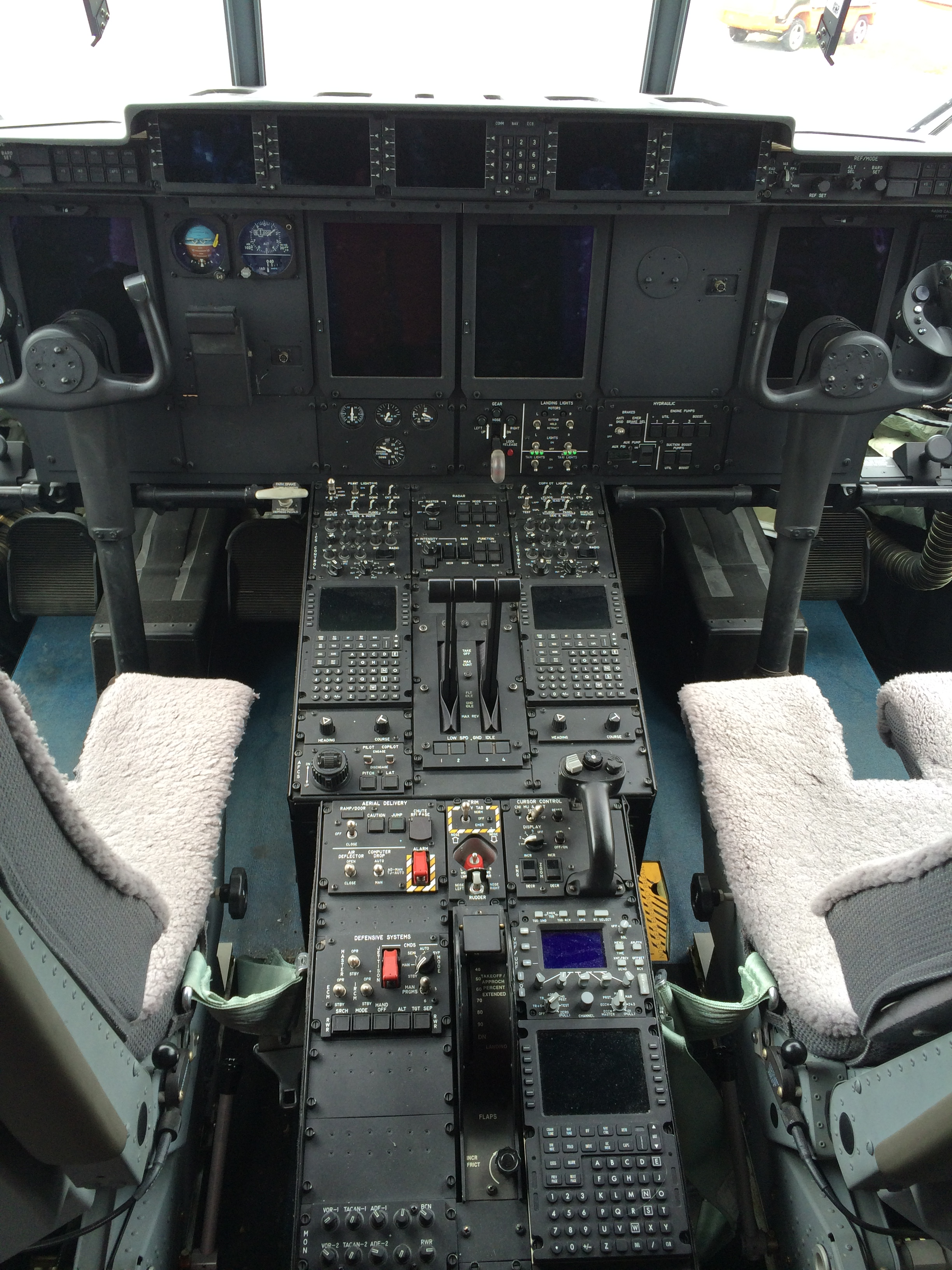
A Super Hercules cockpit

On 16 December 1994, Lockheed received the launch order for the J-model from the United Kingdom's Royal Air Force (RAF). The C-130J launch order occurred after a UK government stalemate of several months that concerned whether to buy new transport aircraft from Europe or the United States. It was paired with a commitment to buy 40 to 50 of the proposed European Future Large Aircraft aircraft (FLA, which was later designated as the A400M). The FLA commitment, which reduced the size of the C-130J launch order, was intended to ensure a 20 percent British workshare in the FLA program, and to prevent German industry from threatening British Aerospace's position as the wing manufacturer on the FLA and future Airbus commercial projects. The RAF ordered 25 aircraft for a total fixed price of US$1.6 billion (~$3.03 billion in 2025), with first deliveries originally scheduled to begin in November 1996. The promised deliveries of the C-130J allowed the British Ministry of Defence to meet the 1996 deadline for replacing half of the RAF's aging fleet of Hercules aircraft, while the FLA aircraft was not at the time expected to be available until 2003.

To speed up the sale of military and commercial versions of the aircraft, Federal Aviation Administration (FAA) civil certification was pursued before delivery would happen. Civil certification was not a regulatory requirement and was unneeded for the RAF launch order. However, certification was stipulated in Lockheed Martin's contracts with some subsequent customers, including the United States Air Force (USAF) and the Royal Australian Air Force (RAAF).

The program suffered from problems such as software integration glitches that extended the schedule by three months, followed by a nine-month delay caused by undiscovered stall characteristics that required aircraft modification. The stall problem was caused by the additional power of the engines and the increase in propeller blades from 4 to 6, which changed the aerodynamics such that the aircraft had a greater tendency to stall and roll at lower speeds.

Lockheed Martin spent five months making 20 unsuccessful attempts at aerodynamic solutions, but the stall problems were so varied that the fixes it tried to make applied only to specific conditions (such as only during power off, or only at full power). Lockheed Martin changed the cockpit to include a stick pusher, which takes control and automatically pushes down the aircraft's nose if the pilot does not respond to stall warnings. The stick pusher was meant to be a temporary addition until Lockheed Martin could find an aerodynamic fix for all of the new stall conditions.

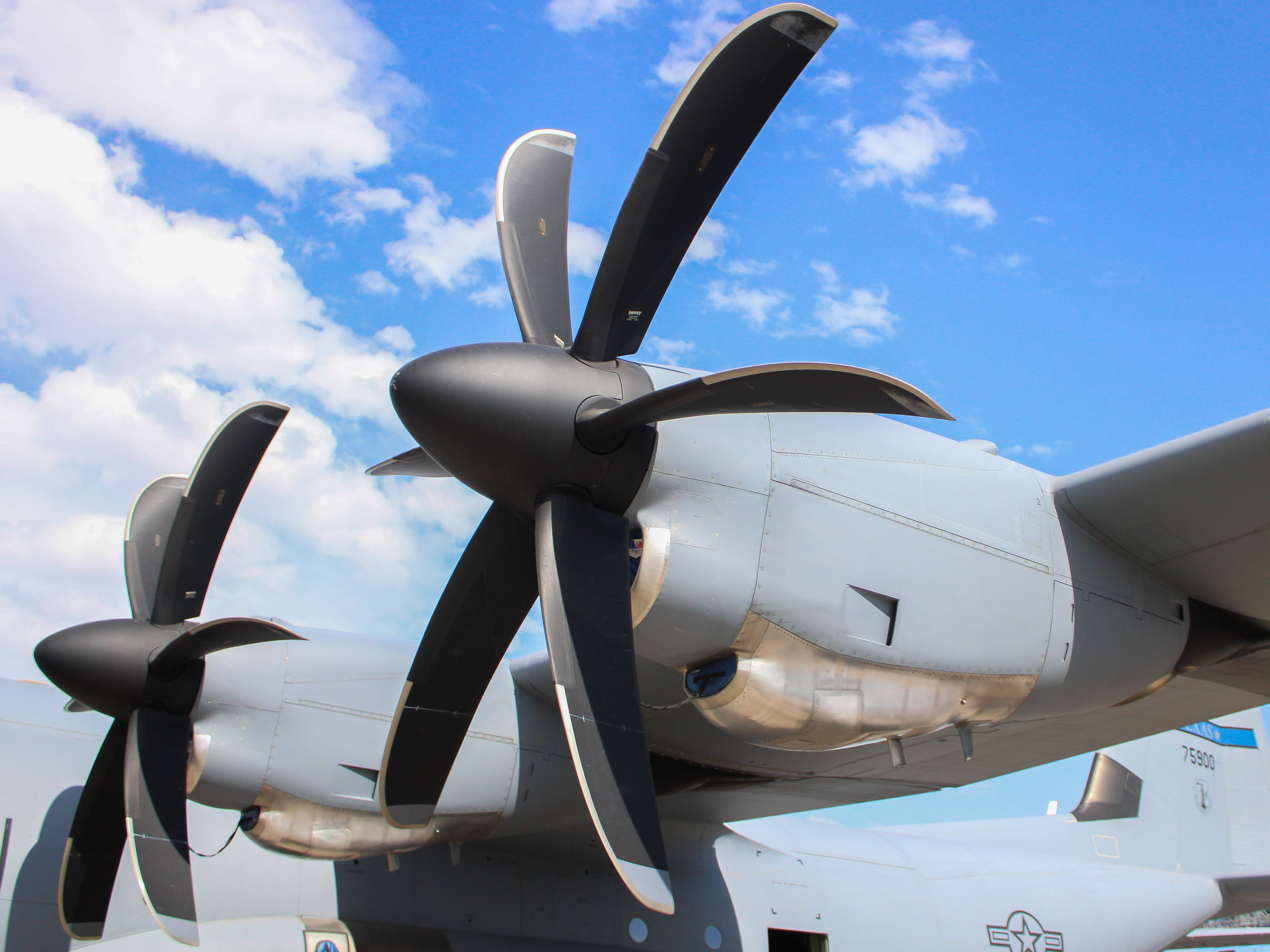
AE2100 Engine on a C-130J-30

In late 1997, the company discovered that directional problems could be caused by ice build-ups. Because the AE 2100 engines were more powerful and fuel-efficient than the Allison T56 engines that they replaced, the engines no longer produced enough bleed air to continuously warm the tail. This situation had been anticipated, but the cyclic system that replaced the old de-icing system was found to be insufficient when the C-130J flew in extreme conditions. This problem forced the company to extend the de-icing system higher and lower on the vertical stabilizer to prevent ice formation, causing another delay of five months. These issues resulted in Lockheed Martin exceeding its initial C-130J development budget of US$300 million. By May 1998, Lockheed had spent over US$900 million (~$1.66 billion in 2025) in development costs for the C-130J. By the end of 1998, the company owed the RAF about US$50 million (~$92 million in 2025) in penalties due to the delivery delays.

FAA type certification occurred in September 1998 following 4,000 hours of flight testing. Deliveries commenced in 1999 as the Hercules C4 (C-130J-30) and Hercules C5 (C-130J). The standard C-130J had a flyaway cost of US$62 million in 2008.

On 23 December 2004, U.S. Deputy Secretary of Defense Paul Wolfowitz approved a program budget decision that ended the procurement of C-130J for the Air Force and completed the remaining KC-130J order for the Marine Corps in 2006, which would save US$5 billion in the Pentagon budget. Deficiencies with the C-130J that were cited to support the decision included being unable to drop heavy equipment, the inability to perform combat search-and-rescue missions, cold-weather performance issues, the risk of paratroopers hitting the fuselage when jumping out of the aircraft, major cost increases, and inadequate radar to fly into hurricanes. U.S. Secretary of Defense Donald Rumsfeld reversed this decision on May 10, 2005, after members of Congress stated that canceling the pre-existing orders of 62 total Air Force aircraft over the following five years would result in about US$2 billion (~$3.16 billion in 2025) in termination costs to the government, which would have exceeded the cost of buying the aircraft.

In mid-June 2008, the United States Air Force awarded a $470 million (~$689 million in 2025) contract to Lockheed Martin for six modified KC-130J aircraft for use by the Air Force and Special Operations Command. The contract led to C-130J variants that will replace aging HC-130s and MC-130s. The HC-130J Combat King II personnel recovery aircraft completed developmental testing on 14 March 2011. The final test point was air-to-air refueling, and was the first ever boom refueling of a C-130 where the aircraft's refueling receiver was installed during aircraft production. This test procedure also applied to the MC-130J Combat Shadow II aircraft in production for Air Force Special Operations Command.

=== Harvest HAWK ===
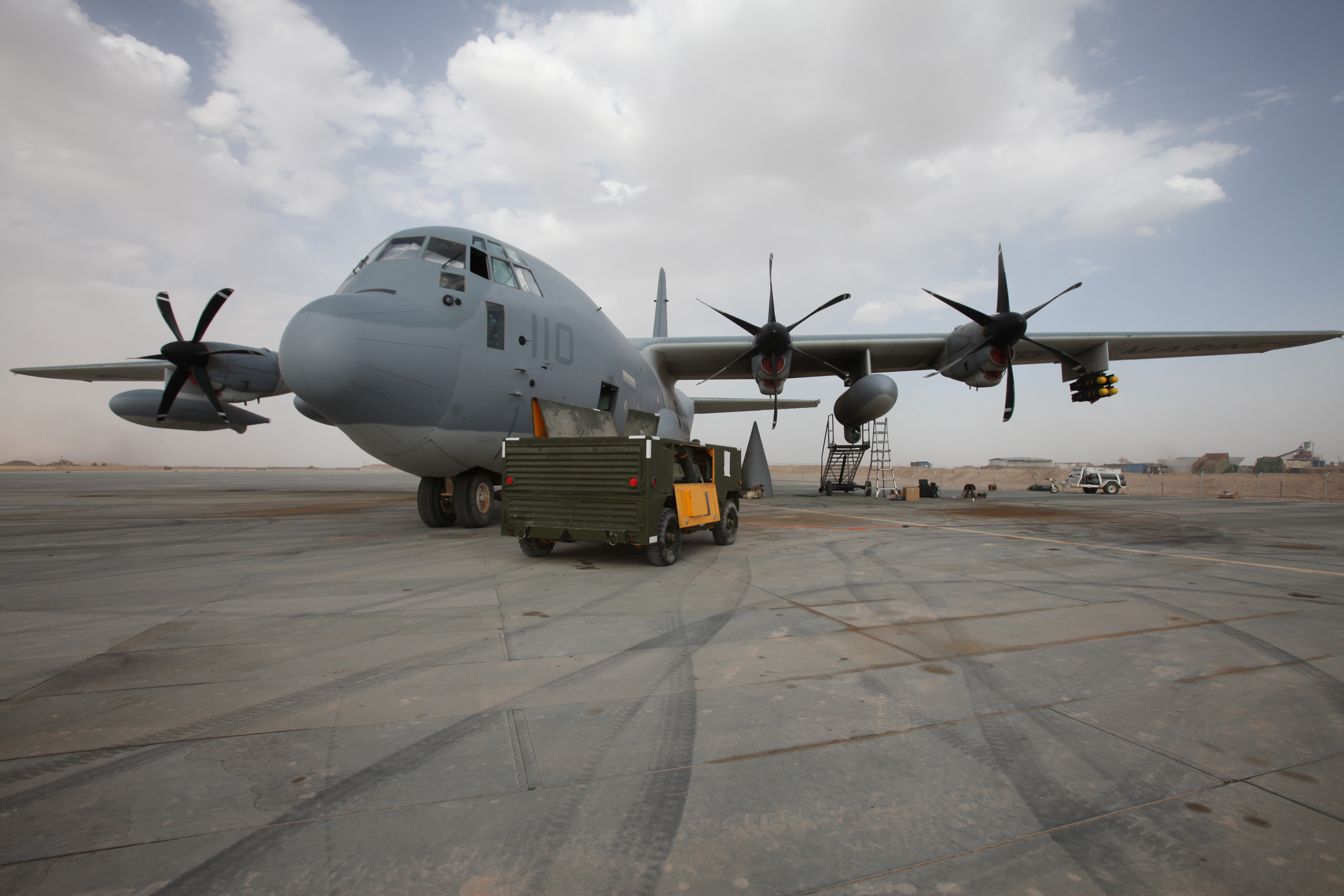
A KC-130J showing the AN/AAQ-30 Targeting Sight and AGM-114 Hellfires on the left wing in Afghanistan, 2011

With the addition of the Marine Corps ISR / Weapon Mission Kit, the KC-130J tanker variant will be able to serve as an overwatch aircraft and can deliver ground support fire in the form of Hellfire or Griffin missiles, precision-guided bombs, and eventually 30mm Mk44 Bushmaster II cannon fire in a later upgrade. This capability, designated as "Harvest HAWK" (Hercules Airborne Weapons Kit), can be used in scenarios where precision is not a requisite, such as area denial. The aircraft retains its original capabilities in refueling and transportation. The kit can be removed within a day if necessary.

=== TACAMO ===
The United States Navy is considering replacing its fleet of E-6B Mercury aircraft with C-130J-30 Hercules aircraft in the Take Charge And Move Out (TACAMO) survivable nuclear communications role. The U.S. Navy's Naval Air Systems Command (NAVAIR) posted a solicitation for fatigue test aircraft to a government procurement website on 18 December 2020. It is to award Lockheed Martin a contract for three "stretched" Hercules in fiscal years 2022 and 2023 for testing and analysis for the TACAMO mission.

== Design ==
Externally similar to the classic Hercules in general appearance, the J-model features considerably updated technology. These differences include new Rolls-Royce AE 2100 D3 turboprop engines, Dowty R391 six-bladed composite scimitar propellers that have blade tips swept by 35 degrees, digital avionics (including head-up displays (HUDs) for each pilot), and reduced crew requirements. These changes have improved performance over its C-130E/H predecessors, such as 40% greater range, 21% higher maximum speed, and 41% shorter takeoff distance. Because of the deicing problem discovered late in the certification program, the C-130J includes a black rubber deicing boot at the bottom of the vertical fin, which is another visual difference from previous versions of the Hercules. The J-model is available in a standard-length or stretched -30 variant.

As a cargo and airlift aircraft, the C-130J's crew includes two pilots and one loadmaster (no navigator or flight engineer), while specialized USAF variants (e.g., AC-130J, EC-130J, MC-130J, HC-130J, WC-130J) may have larger crews, such as navigators/Combat Systems Officers or other specialized officer and enlisted air crew. The U.S. Marine Corps KC-130J uses a crew chief for expeditionary operations. The C-130J's cargo compartment is approximately 41 feet (12.5 m) long, 9 feet (2.74 m) high, and 10 feet (3.05 m) wide, and loading is from the rear of the fuselage.

The aircraft can be configured with the "enhanced cargo handling system". The system consists of a computerized loadmaster's station from which the user can remotely control the under-floor winch and configure the flip-floor system to palletized roller or flat-floor cargo handling. Initially developed for the USAF, this system enables rapid role changes to be carried out and so extends the C-130J's time available to complete taskings.

In 2010, Elbit Systems was awarded a contract to supply its J-MUSIC Directed Infrared Countermeasure (DIRCM) system for integration on the Italian Air Force's C-130J aircraft. J-MUSIC, part of the MUSIC family, uses fiber-laser technology and a high-speed thermal imaging system to protect against heat-seeking missiles, including shoulder-fired MANPADS. This enhancement significantly improves the self-protection capabilities of the C-130J, especially during operations in high-threat environments.

== Operational history ==
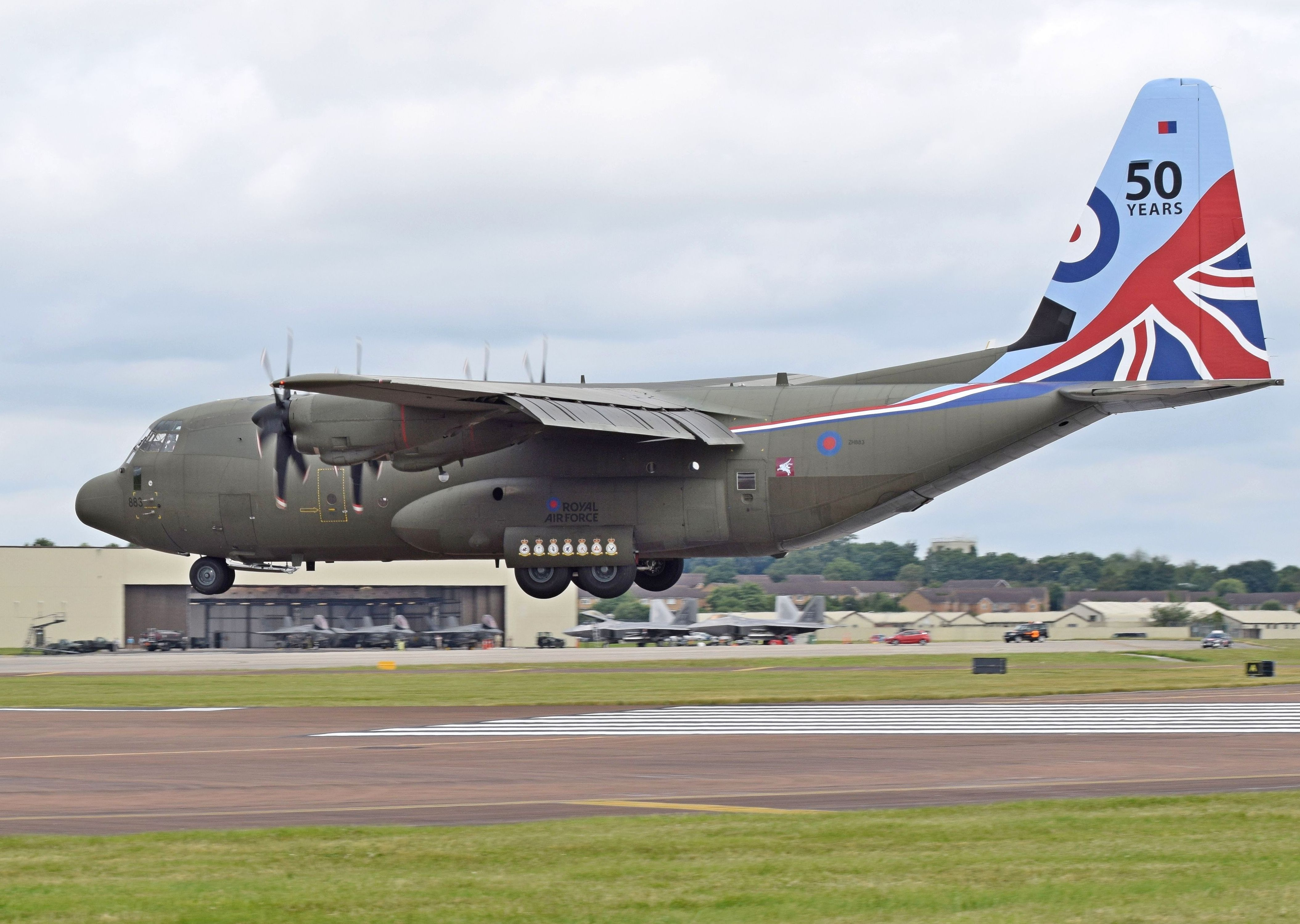
A Hercules C5 (C-130J) of the Royal Air Force arrives at the 2016 Royal International Air Tattoo (RIAT) in England.

The Super Hercules has been used extensively by the USAF and USMC in Iraq and Afghanistan. Canada has also deployed its CC-130J aircraft to Afghanistan.

C-130Js from several countries were deployed in support of the US Operation Odyssey Dawn and NATO's Operation Unified Protector during the 2011 Libyan civil war.

From the first flight on 5 April 1996 to 30 April 2013, 290 C-130J Super Hercules aircraft operated by 13 nations surpassed 1 million flight hours.

In January 2013, it was reported that some of Canada's CC-130J transports had counterfeit Chinese microchips in their cockpit displays that were made by an American Lockheed contractor L3 Communications. These parts are more likely to fail and result in failures such as blank instrument screens during flight. A 14-month investigation by the U.S. Senate Armed Services Committee concluded that counterfeit parts in the Hercules and other American-made military equipment are prone to failure with potentially "catastrophic consequences." The U.S. congressional investigation reported the fake Hercules microchips were originally made by the Korean electronics giant Samsung in the 1990s, and more than a decade later, had been recycled, refurbished and remarked to appear genuine by a different supplier from China. Samsung later stated that "it is not possible to project the reliability" of the altered parts. The U.S. investigation reported that the problems on the Hercules first came to light in 2010 when the instrument panel failed on a U.S. Air Force aircraft during active duty.

On 20 August 2013, the Indian Air Force performed the highest landing of a C-130J at the Daulat Beg Oldi airstrip in Ladakh at the height of 16,614 ft (5,064 m).

On 5 August 2024, following protests in Bangladesh, the former Prime Minister Sheikh Hasina flew in a Bangladesh Air Force C-130J to Delhi, India to seek asylum.

In August 2025, the Indian Air Force, from its Northern Secor, deployed five of its Mi-17 helicopters along with a Chinook and C-130J transport aircraft each for the flood relief operations following the Uttarakhand and Kishtwar district flash floods. The C-130J aircraft boarded by an NDRF team reached Jammu to supply rescue materials, supplies and trained personnel. So far, 50 Army personnel, 21 BSF personnel and over 40 civilians have been rescued by the fleet from regions including Akhnoor, Pathankot and Dera Baba Nanak. Additionally, over 750 kg of relief materials were also air dropped into Pathankot as part of the operation. Additional helicopters and transport aircraft also remained on standby to join the operations if deemed necessary.

=== Civilian use ===
The Modular Airborne FireFighting System (MAFFS) is a self-contained unit used for aerial firefighting that can be loaded onto a C-130 Hercules, which then allows the aircraft to be used as an air tanker against wildfires. This allows the U.S. Forest Service (USFS) to use military aircraft from the Air National Guard and Air Force Reserve to serve as an emergency backup resource to the civilian air tanker fleet. The latest generation MAFFS II system was used for the first time on a fire in July 2010, using the C-130J Super Hercules. The 146th Airlift Wing was the first to transition to the MAFFS II system in 2008, and it remains the only unit flying the new system on the C-130J aircraft.

== Orders and deliveries ==
The largest operator of the new model is the U.S. Air Force, which has ordered the aircraft in increasing numbers. Current operators of the C-130J are the USAF (including the Air Force Reserve Command and the Air National Guard), United States Marine Corps (being their fourth variant after KC-130F, KC-130R and KC-130T,) United States Coast Guard, Indian Air Force, Royal Canadian Air Force, Royal Australian Air Force, Royal Danish Air Force, Royal Norwegian Air Force, Israeli Air Force, and the Italian Air Force. As of March 2022, a total of 500 units have been produced.

=== International orders ===
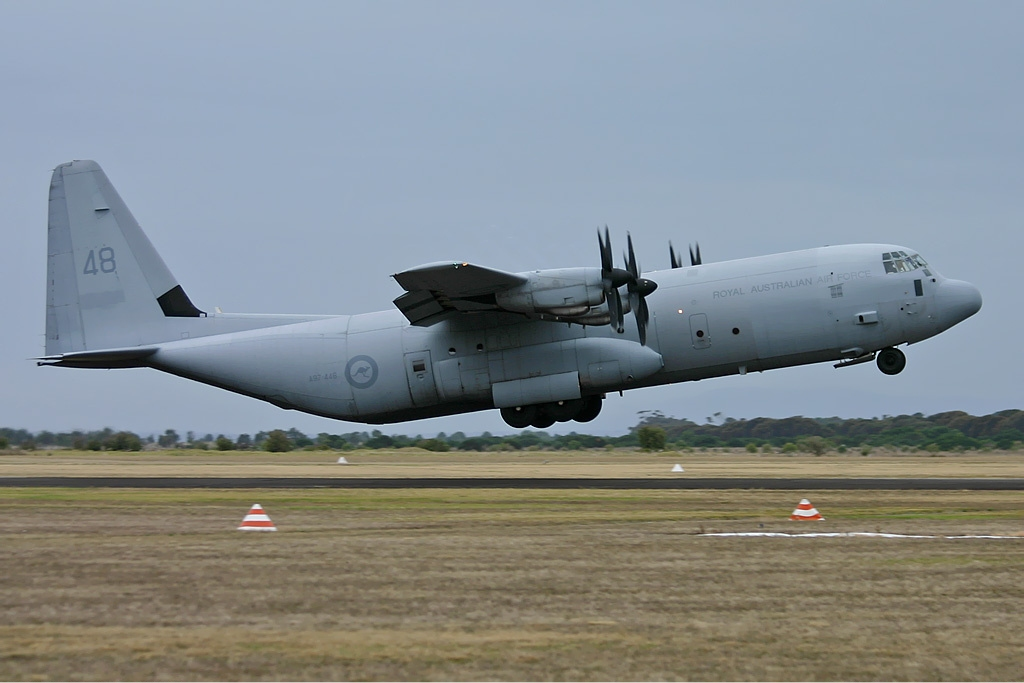
Royal Australian Air Force C-130J-30 at RAAF Williams in 2006

The Royal Australian Air Force was the second international customer for the C-130J-30, with an initial order of 12 aircraft. An order for two more aircraft was planned, but was replaced by the purchase of a fifth Boeing C-17 Globemaster III.

The Royal Norwegian Air Force ordered four C-130J-30s in 2007 to replace six aging C-130Hs in need of repairs. Aircraft were delivered from November 2008 to 2010. One of these was lost in March 2012.

The Canadian Forces signed a US$1.4 billion (~$2.05 billion in 2025) contract with Lockheed Martin for seventeen new C-130J-30s in January 2008, as part of the procurement process to replace the existing C-130E and H models. The C-130J is officially designated as the CC-130J Hercules in Canadian service. The first C-130J was delivered to CFB Trenton in June 2010. The final C-130J was delivered in May 2012.

The Indian Air Force purchased six C-130J-30s in early 2008 at a cost of up to US$1.059 billion for its special operations forces in a package deal with the US government under its Foreign Military Sales (FMS) program. India has options to buy six more aircraft. The Indian government decided not to sign the Communications Interoperability and Security Memorandum of Agreement (CISMOA), which resulted in the exclusion of high precision GPS and other sensitive equipment. The IAF added similar equipment produced indigenously to the aircraft after delivery. In October 2011, India announced its intent to exercise the option for the six additional aircraft, following the C-130J's favorable performance in the 2011 Sikkim earthquake relief operations. In July 2012, the U.S. accepted India's request for the six more C-130Js through the FMS program. In December 2013, India's CCS approved the order for six more aircraft. On 5 August 2025, the Defence Acquisition Council (DAC) accorded the Acceptance of Necessity (AoN) for the sustenance of the C-17 and C-130J fleets of the Indian Air Force.

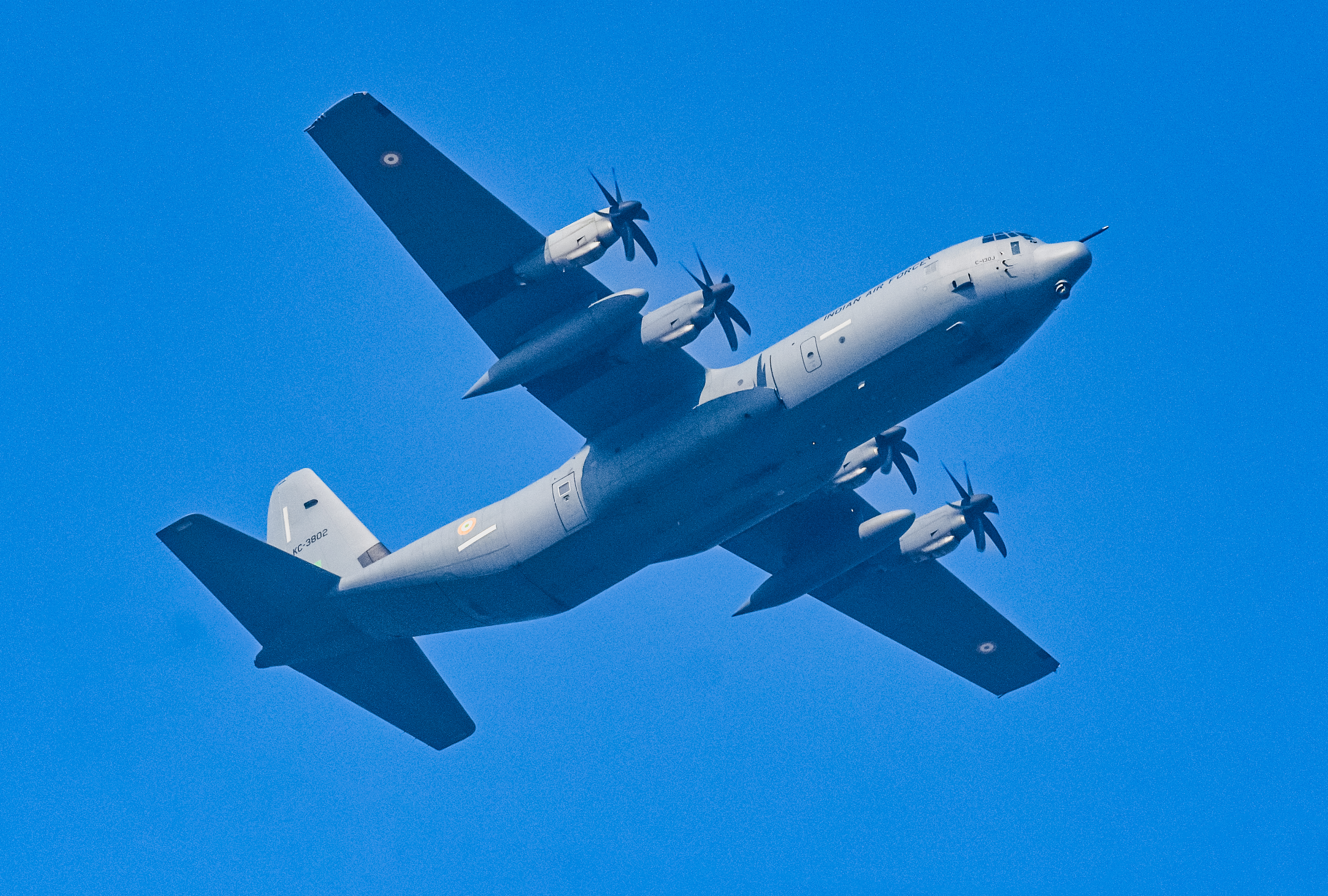
The IAF's C-130J Super Hercules from the 77 Squadron, the 'Veiled Vipers', during the Republic Day Flypast 2024.

The Iraqi Air Force ordered six C-130J-30s in July 2008.

Qatar ordered four C-130Js in October 2008, along with spare parts and training for the Qatar Emiri Air Force. The contract is worth a total of US$393.6 million (~$555 million in 2025) and deliveries are scheduled to begin in 2011.

The United Arab Emirates Air Force announced an order for 12 C-130J transports at the 2009 International Defence Exhibition (IDEX), with an announced value of US$1.3 billion. The United Arab Emirates requested 12 C-130Js through a Direct Commercial Sale in December 2009, with logistics support, training and related systems to be provided through a Foreign Military Sales program. A contract with Lockheed Martin has not been signed.

The Israeli Air Force is seeking to purchase nine C-130J-30s. In April 2010, Israel ordered one C-130J-30 with delivery in 2013, and was in contract talks for two more aircraft in June 2010. (Note: Quote: "Separately, Israel has held preliminary talks with Lockheed Martin about acquiring more C-130J tactical transports. The nation will receive its first example in mid-2013 ...") An option for a second C-130J-30 was exercised in April 2011, along with planning and advance long lead procurement of aircraft components to support the third C-130J Israeli aircraft. The first Israeli C-130J was delivered in June 2013 and was modified with Israeli-unique systems in the United States prior to its arrival in Israel in April 2014. Israel ordered a fourth C-130J-30 in July 2013. The C-130J's local name is "Shimshon".

The Kuwait Air Force signed a contract for three KC-130J air refueling tankers in May 2010, with deliveries to begin in late 2013. The KC-130Js will refuel the KAF's F-18s and augment its fleet of three militarized L-100s.

Oman increased its C-130J order in August 2010 by adding two C-130Js to the single C-130J-30 ordered in 2009. Deliveries are to be completed by early 2014. The Royal Saudi Air Force has purchased two KC-130Js to be delivered in 2016.

The Mexican Government has requested two C-130J-30s.

The Mongolian Air Force is planning to buy three C-130Js.

In July 2013, the C-130J became part of a competition in the Peruvian Air Force for a medium transport aircraft. The Super Hercules was a candidate along with the EADS CASA C-295, the Alenia C-27J Spartan, the Antonov An-70, and the upgraded Antonov An-32. The Peruvian Air Force selected the C-27J in November 2013.

In 2015, the French Air Force ordered four Super Hercules to supplement existing capabilities due to the ongoing problems and delays of the ordered Airbus A400M, through FMS the French got two C-130J in 2017/2018 and two KC-130J in 2018/2019 (helicopter refuelling capability), especially supporting French overseas operations in Africa.

In January 2017, German defence minister announced the intention to purchase three C-130J and three KC-130J Hercules to acquire tactical airlift capabilities due to the delayed deliveries of the Airbus A400M.

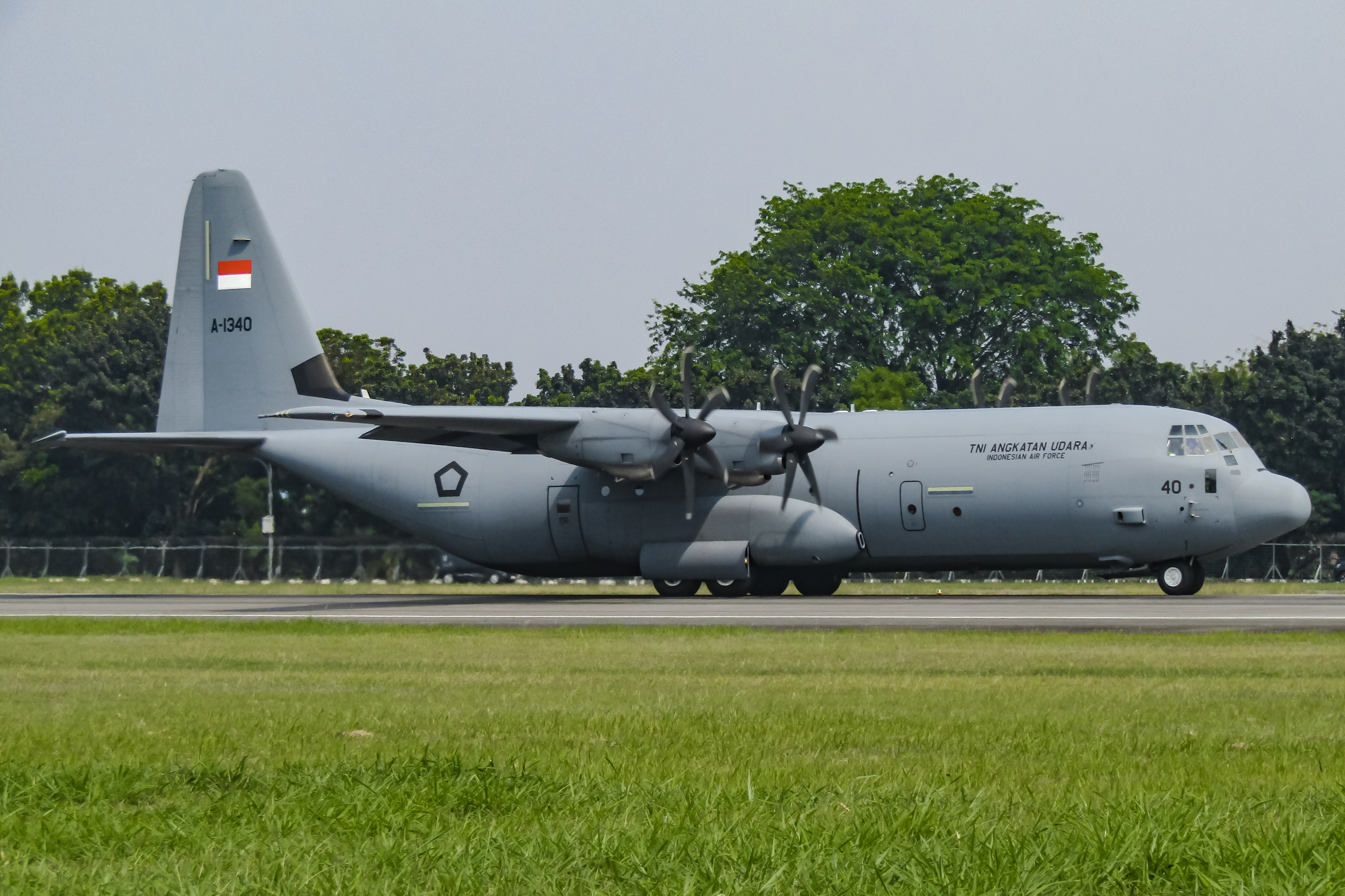
Indonesian Air Force C-130J-30 at Halim Perdanakusuma Airport, 2024

In September 2018, Indonesia's state-owned news agency Antara reported that minister of defence Ryamizard Ryacudu said Indonesia is looking to acquire five C-130J Super Hercules aircraft. In September 2021, it was reported that Indonesia ordered five C-130J-30 aircraft from Lockheed Martin for the Indonesian Air Force in 2019, with the first aircraft already under construction. In 2023, Indonesian Air Force received its first C-130J-30 that arrived at Lanud Halim Perdanakusuma.

In June 2019, New Zealand's Minister of Defence Ron Mark identified the C-130J-30 as the preferred replacement for the Royal New Zealand Air Force's five remaining C-130Hs that were planned to be in service until 2023. In November 2019, the US Defense Security Cooperation Agency notified Congress of the potential sale of five C-130Js, 24 engines and related equipment for an estimated cost of US$1.4 billion (~$1.74 billion in 2025). The sale was confirmed in June 2020, with the planes expected to be delivered between 2024 and 2025. The first aircraft was delivered on August 8, 2024 at Lockheed Martin's facility in Marietta, Georgia.

In September 2020, Philippine Air Force chief Allen T. Paredes planned to acquire five C-130J-30 aircraft. The quantity was later reduced to two after government funds were prioritized for the COVID-19 pandemic response. In December 2022, the Notice of Award has already been released for the acquisition of three C-130J-30 Super Hercules heavy transport aircraft from Lockheed Martin however no official announcement has been made by both parties including PAF. In October 2023, the DND announced the acquisition of three C-130J-30 with the contract worth ₱22.2 billion, the first C-130J is scheduled to be delivered in July 2026, the second is in October of the same year and the third plane is in January 2027.

In January 2022, the United States Department of State announced its approval of Egypt's request to purchase 12 C-130J aircraft with related equipment and notified Congress.

In 2022, the Swedish Air Force ordered four ex-Italian Air Force C-130J-30s for delivery in 2023 and 2024. This order was reportedly put on hold in 2023 for review. In 2024, the Embraer C-390 was chosen instead.

In November 2022, the US agreed to a Foreign Military Sales purchase by Australia of 24 C-130J-30 aircraft, that will effectively double the RAAF fleet after the existing aircraft have been retired.

In September 2024, NOAA announced an order for two modified C-130Js to replace its existing WP-3D Orion Hurricane Hunter aircraft.

=== Deliveries ===
Year	1998	1999	2000	2001	2002	2003	2004	2005	2006	2007	2008	2009	2010	2011
Number	19	30	20	15	8	15	13	15	12	12	12	16	25	33

Year	2012	2013	2014	2015	2016	2017	2018	2019	2020	2021	2022	2023	2024	Total
Number	34	25	24	21	24	26	25	28	22	22	24	21	21	562

== Variants ==
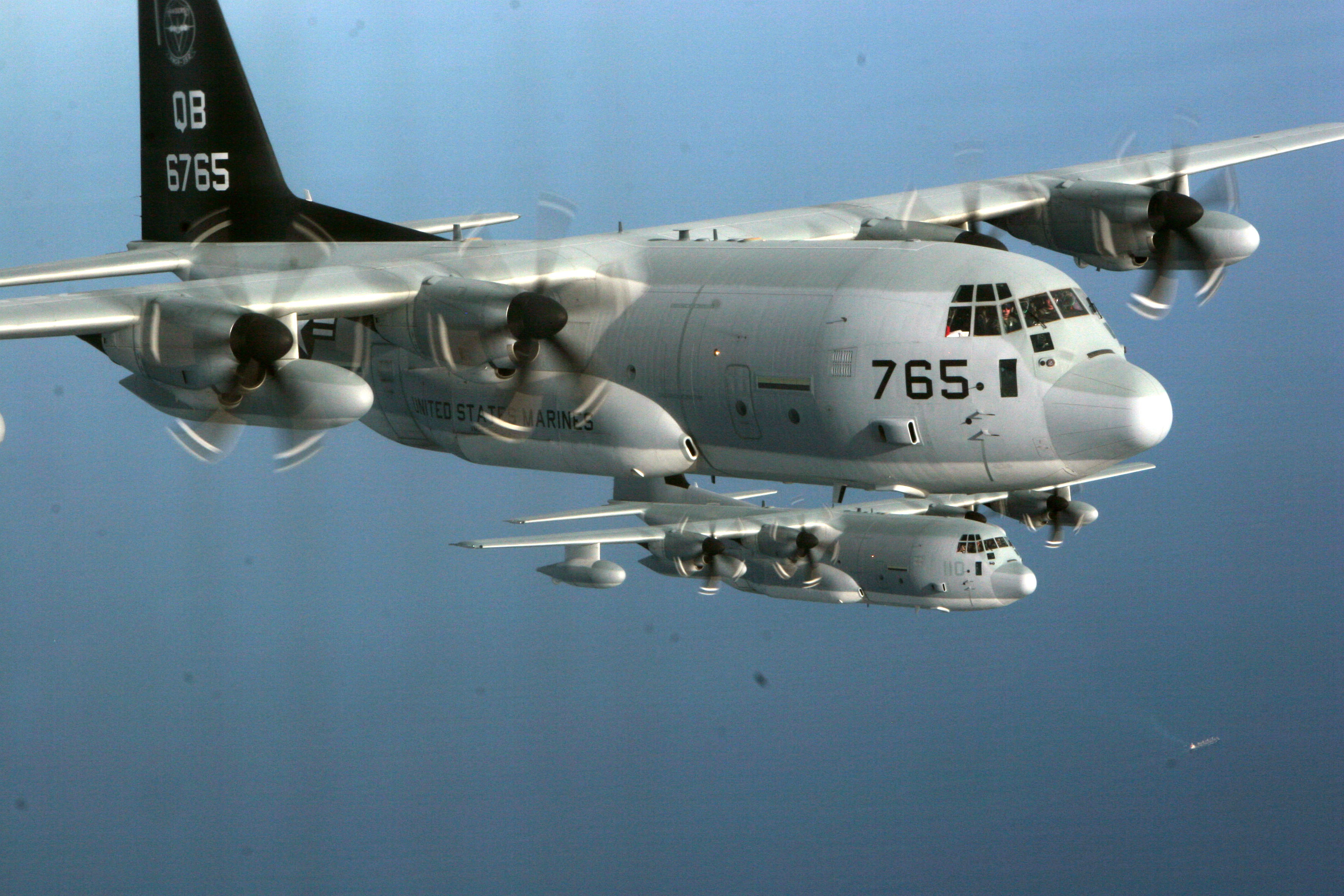
Two USMC KC-130Js of VMGR-352 during a training exercise

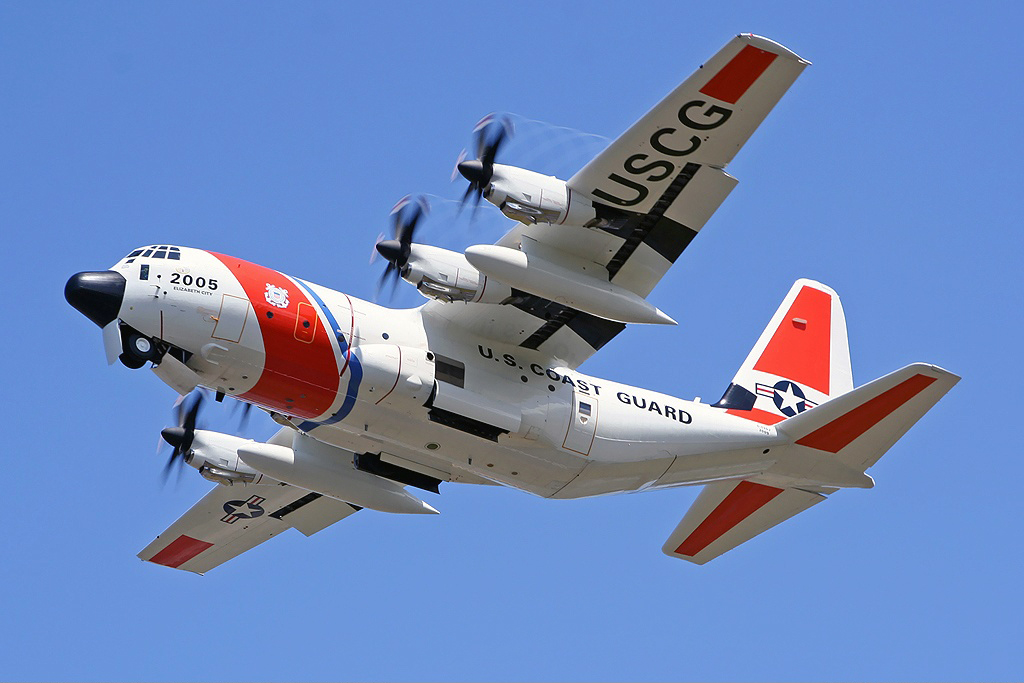
A USCG HC-130J Super Hercules

C-130J Super Hercules
Tactical airlifter
C-130J-30
Lockheed Martin designation for its 15 ft (4.6 m) extended fuselage variant; designated CC-130J by USAF for a short time after 2002 and later renamed into C-130J, so there are two different variants under the same designation. It has a payload capacity of 22 tonnes.
C-130J-SOF
Variant outfitted with extended ISR equipment for use with special forces. Unveiled in June 2017.
CC-130J Hercules
Royal Canadian Air Force designation for the C-130J-30.
AC-130J
(Ghostrider) variant of Lockheed AC-130 for USAF ground support operations.
E-130J
Variant for the U.S. Navy's TACAMO operations to replace the E-6 Mercury. Based on the C-130J-30.
EC-130J Commando Solo III
Variant for the Air Force Special Operations Command, operated by the Pennsylvania Air National Guard. This variant was retired from service in September 2024.
HC-130J Super Hercules and HC-130J Combat King II
Comes in two variants: The HC-130J Super Hercules is a long range patrol and air-sea rescue variant for the U.S. Coast Guard. The HC-130J COMBAT KING II is a U.S. Air Force version that can be refueled in-flight by KC-46 and KC-135 aircraft and can itself in-flight refuel various models of U.S. military helicopters and the USAF CV-22, USMC MV-22, and USN CMV-22 tilt-rotor aircraft. The USAF HC-130J is nearly identical to the USAF MC-130J, differentiated by only a few additional electronic systems carried by the MC-130J.
KC-130J
Aerial refueling tanker and tactical airlifter version for United States Marine Corps.
MC-130J Commando II
Designed for Air Force Special Operations Command. Originally named Combat Shadow II.
MC-130J Commando II Amphibious Capability
A proposed twin-float amphibious modification to allow support operations at sea and in near-shore areas; the initial flight test has been repeatedly pushed back.
WC-130J
Weather reconnaissance ("Hurricane Hunter") version for the Air Force Reserve Command.
Hercules C4
Royal Air Force designation for the C-130J-30
Hercules C5
Royal Air Force designation for the C-130J
LM-100J
A civilian version of the C-130J-30
SC-130J Sea Hercules
Proposed maritime patrol version of the C-130J, designed for coastal surveillance and anti-submarine warfare.

== Operators ==
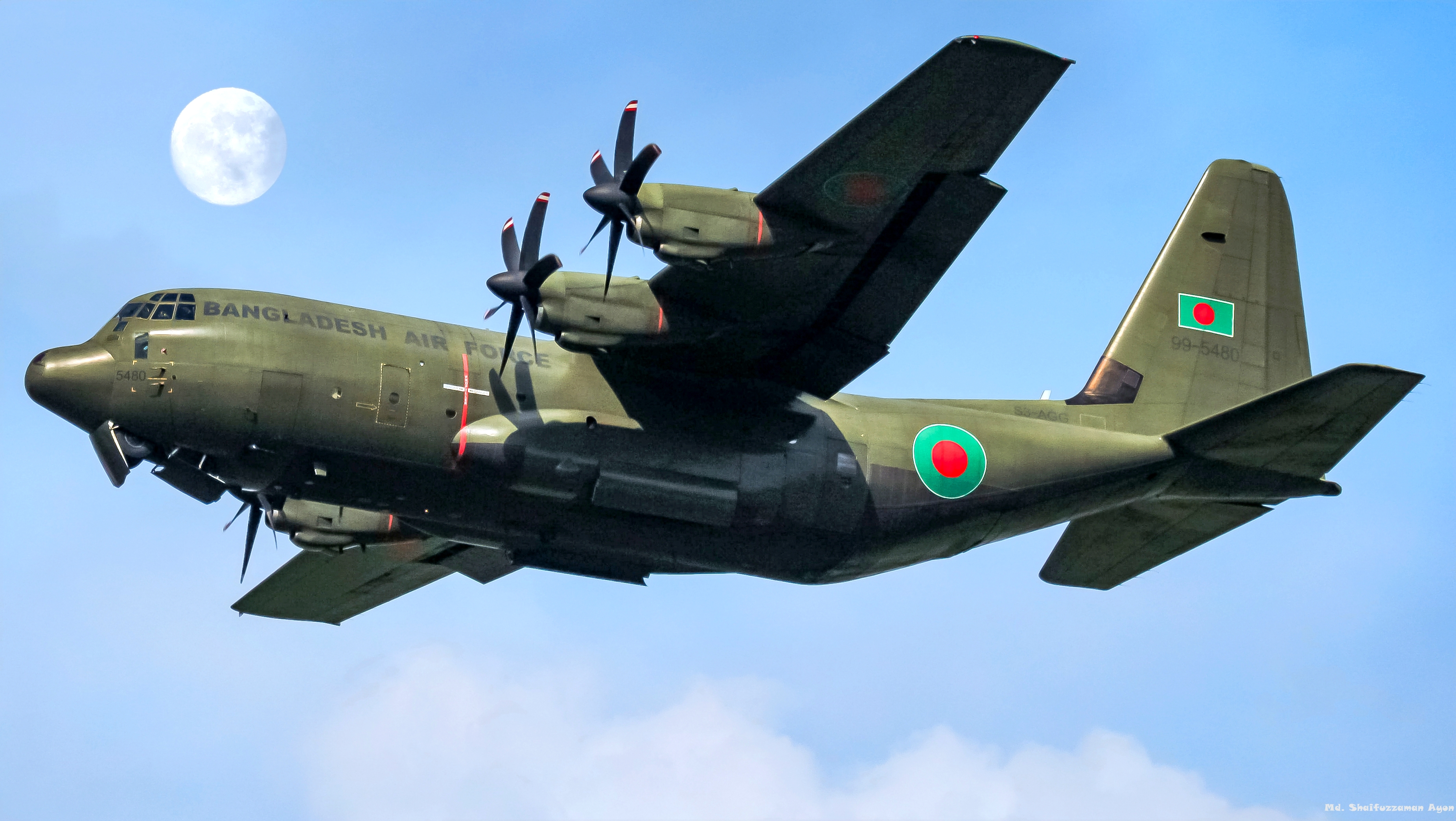
Bangladesh Air Force C-130J Mk5

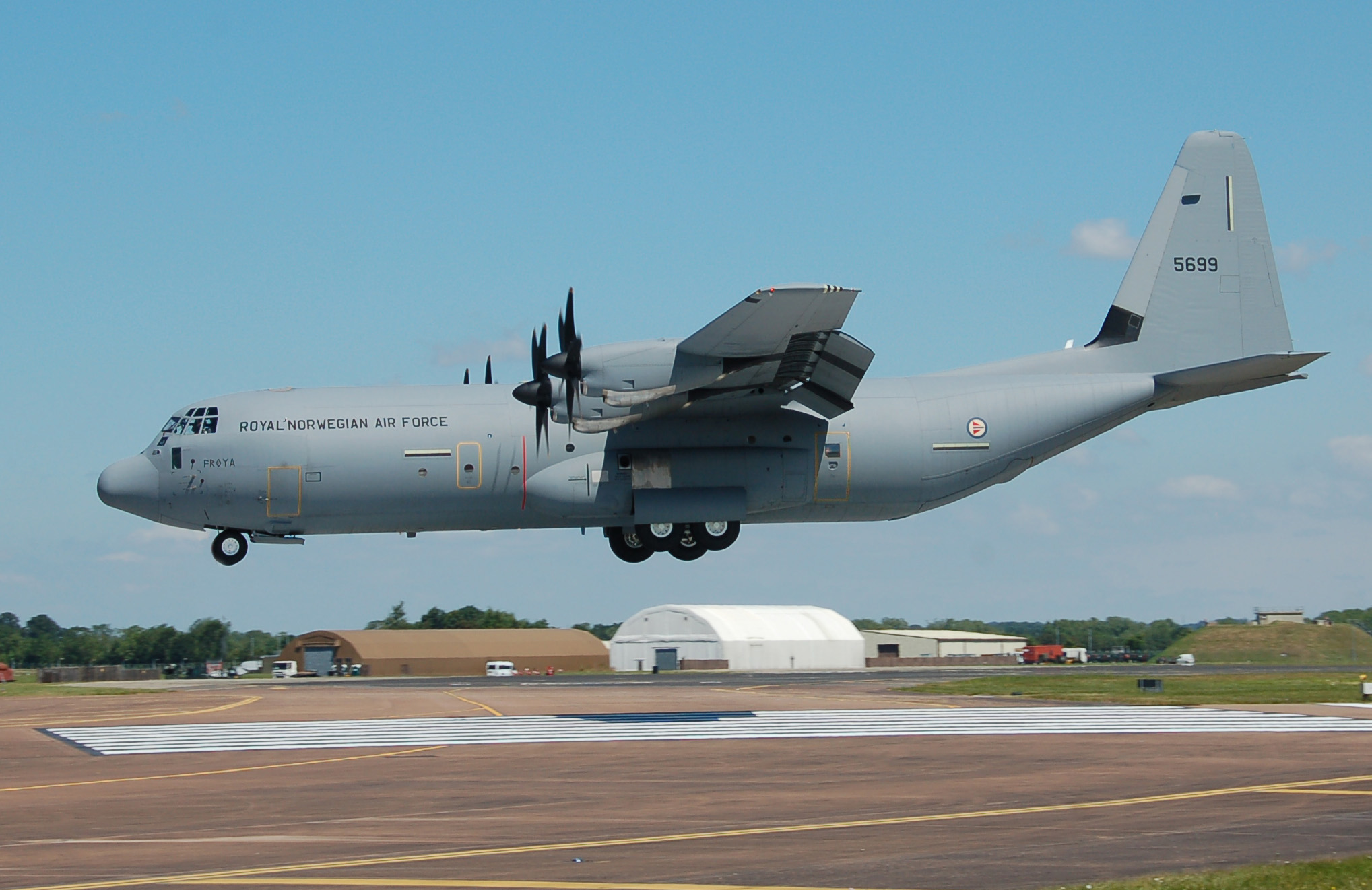
Royal Norwegian Air Force C-130J arrives at the 2014 Royal International Air Tattoo, UK

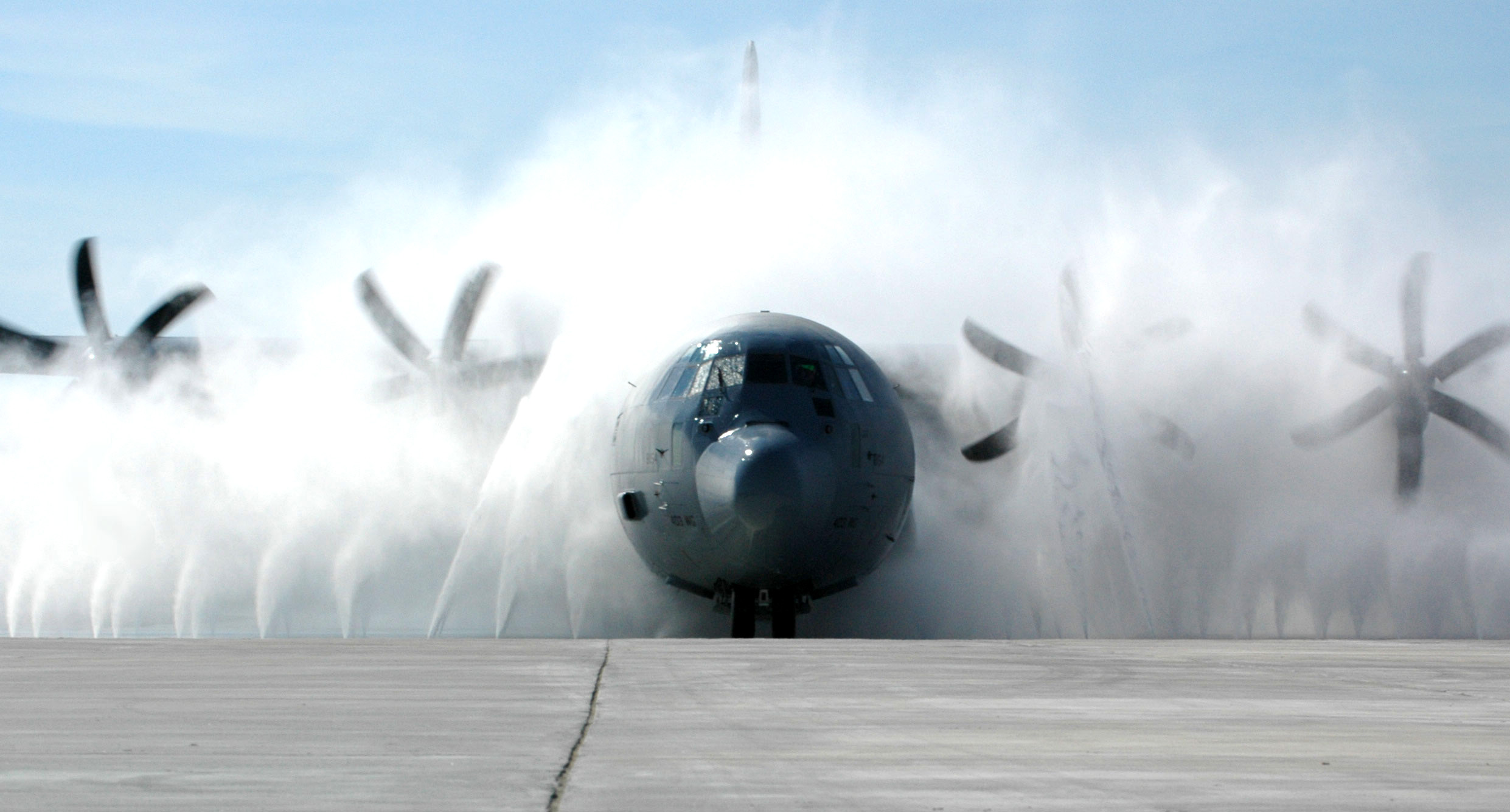
A C-130J cleaned in the wash system at Keesler Air Force Base, Mississippi.

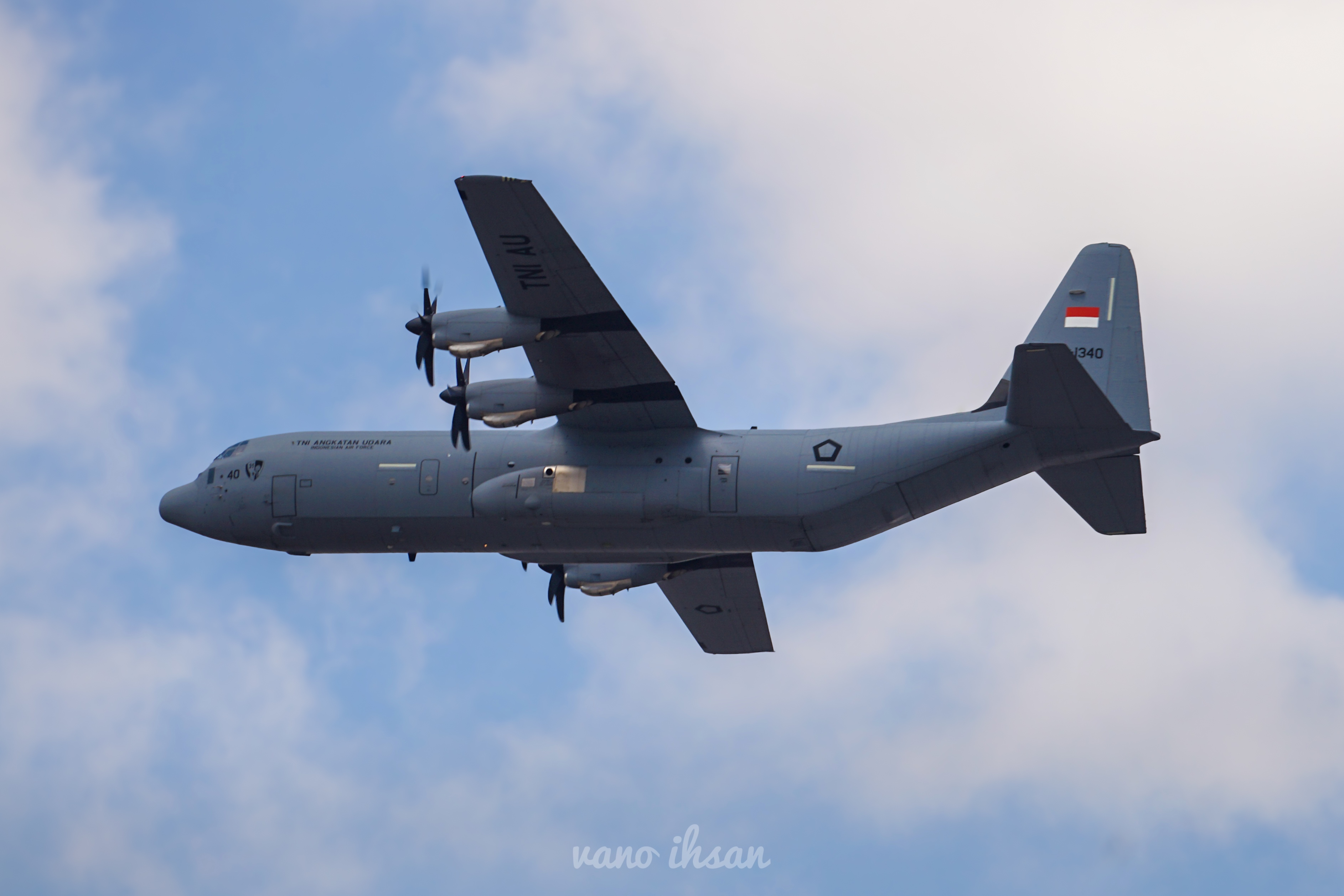
C-130J training in Yogyakarta, Indonesia in preparation for the Indonesian Air Force's birthday in April 2024

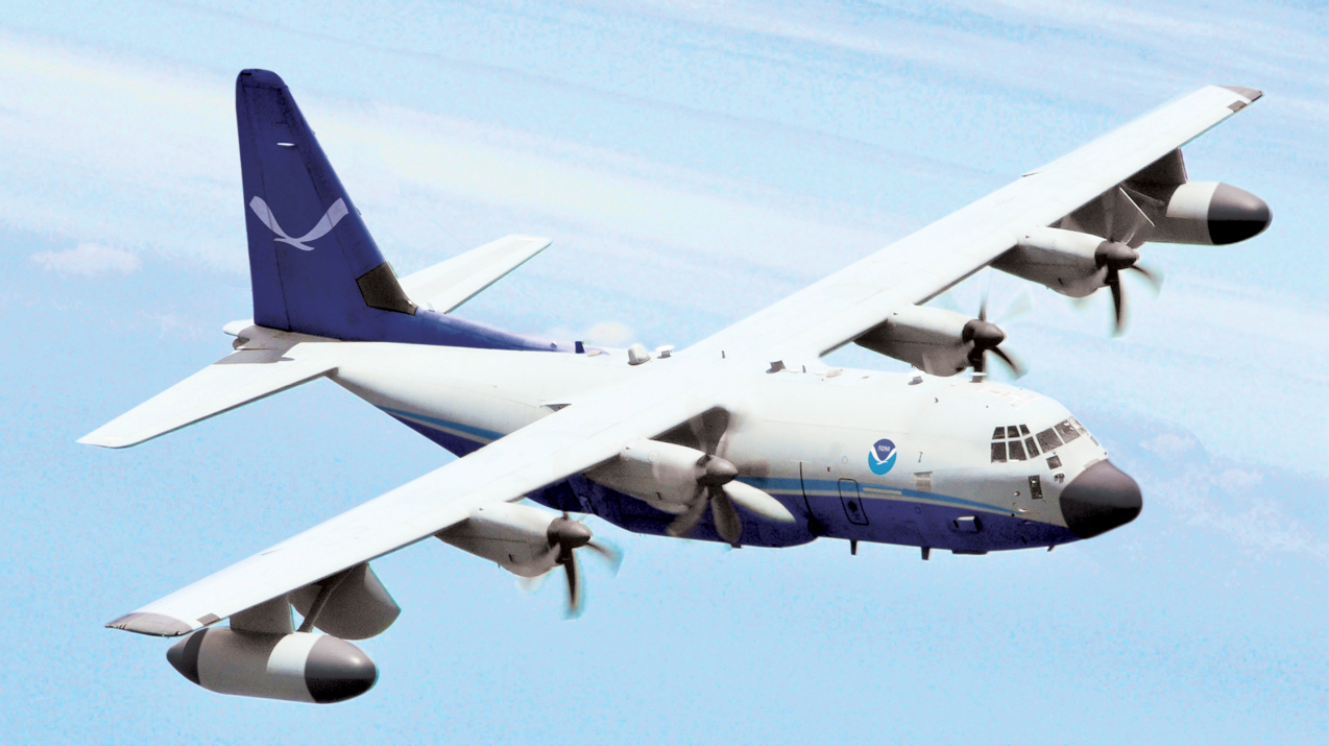
Artist's rendition of the National Oceanic and Atmospheric Administration C-130J hurricane hunter variant to be delivered in 2030.

Algeria

- Algerian Air Force – two C-130J in service and 2 more on order as of June 2022.

Australia

- Royal Australian Air Force – 12 C-130J-30s in service as of January 2014, 20 more C-130J-30s ordered in July 2023.
  - No. 37 Squadron

Bahrain

- Royal Bahraini Air Force – One ex-RAF C-130J in service as of December 2018, with additional one on order.

Bangladesh

- Bangladesh Air Force – Five C-130Js on service. All are ex-RAF aircraft brought from surplus which were refurbished and modified by Marshall Group.
  - 101 Squadron Special Flying Unit

Canada

- Royal Canadian Air Force – 17 C-130J-30s in operation as of January 2025
  - 436 Transport Squadron

Denmark

- Royal Danish Air Force – four C-130J-30s in service as of December 2018

Egypt

- Egyptian Air Force – two C-130Js on order for delivery in 2019.

France

- French Air and Space Force – two C-130J-30s and two KC-130Js based at Orléans – Bricy Air Base in joint Franco-German unit. First C-130J inducted into service in January 2018.

Germany

- German Air Force – three C-130J-30s and 3 KC-130Js on order, to be based at Évreux-Fauville Air Base in France in joint Franco-German unit.

India

- Indian Air Force – 12 C-130J-30s in service as of December 2019. A total of 12 C-130J-30s had been ordered by December 2013; One crashed in 2014, which was replaced in 2019.
  - 77 Squadron
  - 87 Squadron

Indonesia

- Indonesian Air Force – five C-130J-30 in service as of May 2024

Iraq

- Iraqi Air Force – three C-130J-30s in service as of January 2014, with a total of six C-130J-30s on order.

Israel

- Israeli Air Force – six C-130J-30s ordered with deliveries beginning in 2013. It planned to acquire a total of nine C-130J-30s in 2008. 7 received as of January 2019.

Italy

- Italian Air Force – 20 aircraft (four C-130Js, ten C-130J-30s, and six KC-130J) in service as of January 2022.

Kuwait

- Kuwait Air Force – three KC-130Js delivered with an option to purchase three more.

Libya

- Libyan Air Force – two C-130J-30 on order

New Zealand

- Royal New Zealand Air Force – five C-130J-30s in service as of 19 December 2024.

Norway

- Royal Norwegian Air Force – four C-130J-30s in service as of January 2014.

Oman

- Royal Air Force of Oman – one C-130J-30 in use as of January 2014. Two more C-130Js on order with delivery in 2014.

Philippines

- Philippine Air Force – three C-130J-30s on order, with deliveries to be completed by 2027.

Saudi Arabia

- Royal Saudi Air Force – two KC-130J tankers in service

South Korea

- Republic of Korea Air Force – four C-130J-30s ordered with for delivery in 2014. Two of four aircraft were delivered to Republic of Korea Air Force in 2014.

Tunisia

- Tunisian Air Force – two C-130J-30 received as of December 2014

Turkey

- Turkish Air Force – planned to receive 12 C-130J-30 from Royal Air Force.

Qatar

- Qatar Emiri Air Force – four C-130J-30s in use as of January 2014

United States

- United States Air Force – 273 C-130Js and variants in use as of March 2022
- United States Marine Corps/United States Navy – 65 C-130Js and variants in use as of March 2022
- United States Coast Guard – 15 C-130Js and variants in use as of March 2022
- National Oceanic and Atmospheric Administration (NOAA) – two C-130Js on order with delivery by 2030. Intended to replace NOAA's WP-3D Orion Hurricane Hunter aircraft.

Vietnam

- Vietnam Air Defence - Air Force - three C-130Js have been ordered along with spare parts and training.

=== Former operator ===
United Kingdom

- Royal Air Force – Launch operator of C-130J. 14 aircraft (1 C-130J, and 13 C-130J-30s) were in service as of 2020. The RAF's C-130Js were formally withdrawn from service on 30 June 2023.

== Accidents ==
C-130Js have been involved in the following notable accidents:

- On 12 February 2007, Royal Air Force (RAF) Hercules C.4 (C-130J-30), ZH876, c/n 5460 (built in 1998) was seriously damaged during landing on a desert airstrip by multiple improvised explosive devices (IEDs) along the airstrip, in Maysan province near Basrah, Iraq. There were no casualties to the crew and passengers, but the airframe was damaged beyond repair and subsequently destroyed at the crash site by explosives to prevent it from falling into enemy hands
- On 15 March 2012, Royal Norwegian Air Force (RNoAF) (Norwegian: Luftforsvaret) C-130J-30, 10–5630 'SIW' (the newest of four C-130Js in the RNoAF inventory), c/n 5630, on a flight from Evenes Air Station, Norway to Kiruna, Sweden, impacted the side of Kebnekaise mountain at an altitude of 4,920 feet (1,500 metres) during bad weather after disappearing from radar, and disintegrated. All five RNoAF crew aboard were killed. Continued bad weather meant that a RNoAF Lockheed P-3C Orion surveillance aircraft was not able to spot the wreckage until 17 March. The RNoAF C-130J aircraft was to collect soldiers, and fly back to the Norwegian base for the North Atlantic Treaty Organization (NATO/OTAN) exercise Cold Response.
- On 28 March 2014, Indian Air Force (IAF) C-130J-30 KC-3803 (one of six operated by the IAF), operated by 77 Squadron 'Veiled Vipers', crashed near Gwalior, India, less than ten minutes after takeoff, killing all five personnel aboard. The aircraft was conducting low level penetration training by flying at around 300 feet (90 metres), following a second C-130J. It was then during a climb to 1,000 feet (300 metres) when it stalled after running into wake turbulence from the lead aircraft in the formation, which caused it to crash; suggesting an error of judgement by the pilot.
- On 2 October 2015, a United States Air Force (USAF) C-130J registered as 08-3174, originally from the 317th Airlift Group at Dyess Air Force Base, assigned to the 774th Expeditionary Airlift Squadron, part of the 455th Air Expeditionary Wing, crashed approximately 28 seconds after takeoff from Jalalabad Airport, Afghanistan. All eleven onboard (six US airmen and five civilian contractors) were killed, as were three Afghan troops in a guard tower on the ground. The pilot had previously jammed the control yoke with the case from night-vision goggles, but forgot to remove the case again during the next takeoff.

== Specifications (C-130J) ==

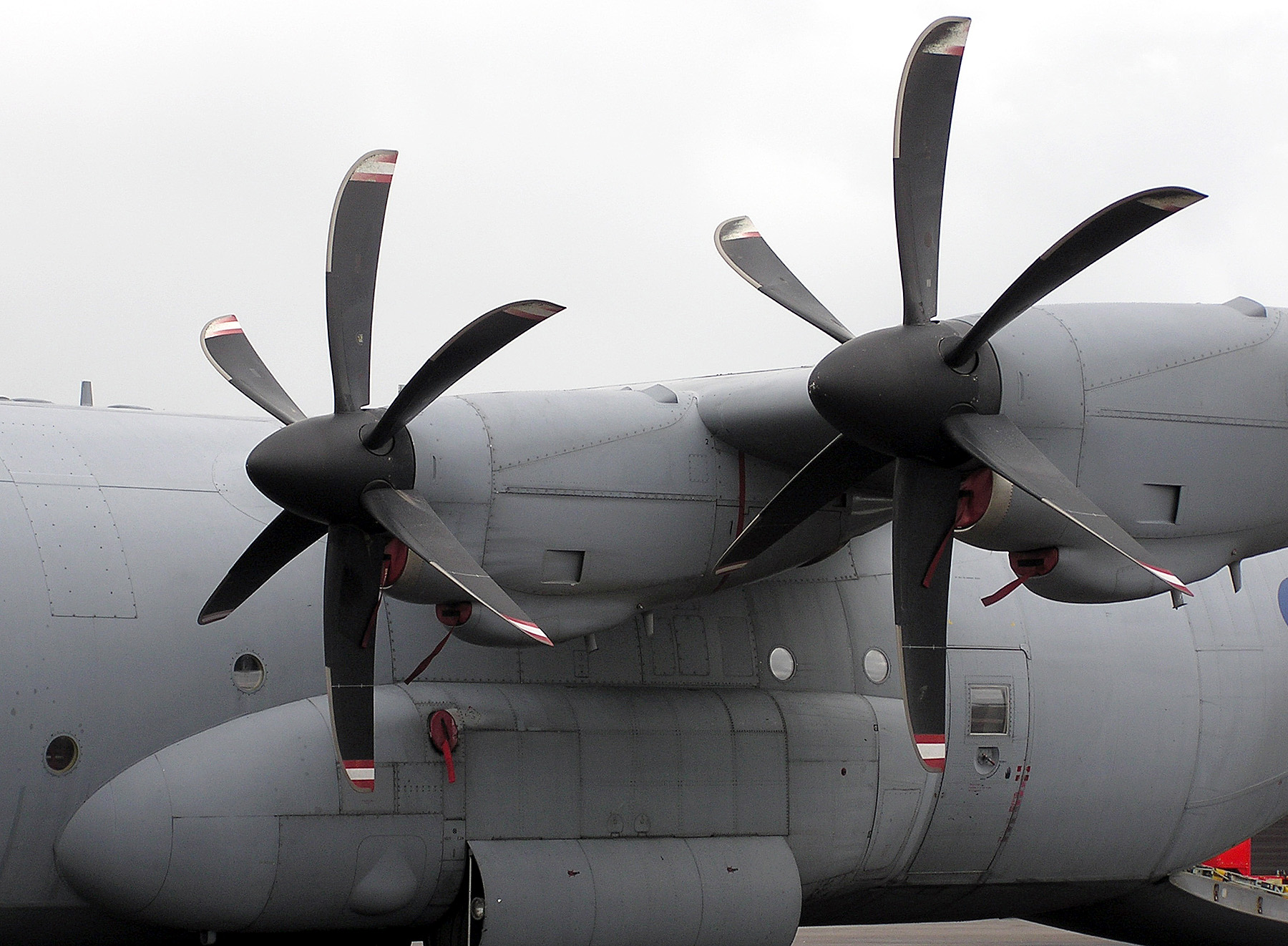
RAF Hercules C4 (C-130J-30) in 2004; six–blade prop closeup

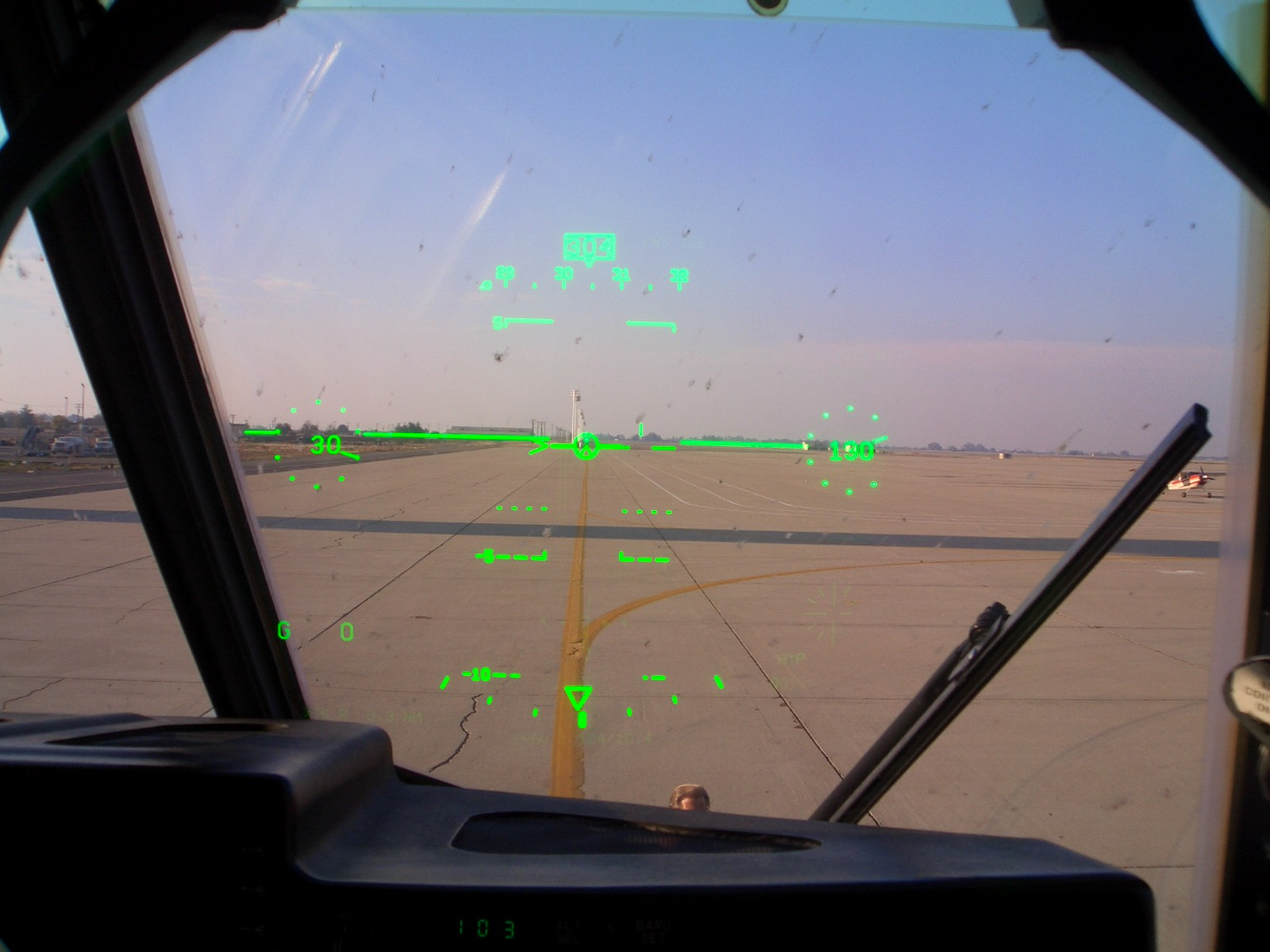
C-130J co-pilot's head-up display (HUD)

Data from USAF C-130 Hercules fact sheet, International Directory of Military Aircraft, Encyclopedia of Modern Military Aircraft, Lockheed Martin C-130J pocket guide

General characteristics

- Crew: 3 (two pilots, and one loadmaster are minimum crew)
- Capacity:

- 92 passengers (-30: 128) or
- 64 airborne troops (-30: 92) or
- 6 463L pallets (-30: 8) or
- 72 litter patients (-30: 97)
- 42,000 lb (19,000 kg) Maximum Allowable Payload (-30: 44,000 lb)

- Cargo bay length: 41 ft (12.50 m)
- Cargo bay width: 10 ft (3.05 m)
- Cargo bay height: 9 ft (2.74 m)
- Payload main: 42,000 lb (19,051 kg)
- Length: 97 ft 9 in (29.79 m)
- Wingspan: 132 ft 7 in (40.41 m)
- Height: 38 ft 10 in (11.84 m)
- Wing area: 1,745 sq ft (162.1 m^{2})
- Airfoil: root: NACA 64A318; tip: NACA 64A412
- Empty weight: 75,562 lb (34,274 kg)
- Max takeoff weight: 164,000 lb (74,389 kg) at 2.5g
- Powerplant: 4 × Rolls-Royce AE 2100D3 turboprop engines, 4,637 shp (3,458 kW) each
- Propellers: 6-bladed Dowty R391 composite constant-speed fully-feathering reversible-pitch propellers

Performance

- Maximum speed: 362 kn (417 mph, 670 km/h) — Mach 0.59 at 22,000 ft (6,706 m) altitude
- Cruise speed: 348 kn (400 mph, 644 km/h)
- Range: 1,800 nmi (2,100 mi, 3,300 km) at max normal payload (34,000 lb (15,422 kg))
- Service ceiling: 28,000 ft (8,500 m) with 42,000 lb (19,051 kg) payload
- Absolute ceiling: 40,386 ft (12,310 m)
- Normal takeoff distance over 50 ft (15 m) barrier: 5,850 ft (1,780 m) (Note: aircraft weight 164,000 lb (74,000 kg), ISA, sea level)
- Maximum effort takeoff roll: 3,100 ft (940 m)
- Normal landing distance over 50 ft (15 m) barrier: 3,000 ft (910 m) (Note: aircraft weight 135,000 pounds (61,000 kg), ISA, sea level)
- Maximum effort landing roll: 1,630 ft (500 m)
- Wingtip turning radius (ground): 89 ft 8 in (27.33 m)

== See also ==
Related development

- Lockheed C-130 Hercules
- Lockheed EC-130
- Lockheed WC-130
- Alenia C-27J Spartan

Aircraft of comparable role, configuration, and era

- Airbus A400M Atlas
- Embraer C-390 Millennium
- Shaanxi Y-9

Related lists

- List of accidents and incidents involving the Lockheed C-130 Hercules
- List of active Canadian military aircraft
- List of active Indian military aircraft
- List of active United States military aircraft
- List of aircraft of the Royal Air Force
- List of current Royal Australian Air Force aircraft
- List of United States military aerial refueling aircraft

== Sources ==
- Borman, Martin W. (1999). Lockheed C-130 Hercules. Marlborough, UK: Crowood Press. ISBN 978-1-86126-205-9.
- Eden, Paul (2004). "Lockheed C-130 Hercules". Encyclopedia of Modern Military Aircraft. London: Amber Books. ISBN 1-904687-84-9.
- Frawley, Gerard (2002). The International Directory of Military Aircraft, 2002/03. Fyshwick, ACT, Australia: Aerospace Publications Pty Ltd. ISBN 1-875671-55-2.
- Hoyle, Craig (4–10 December 2018). "World Air Forces Directory". Flight International. Vol. 194, no. 5665. pp. 332–360. ISSN 0015-3710.
- Reed, Chris (1999). Lockheed C-130 Hercules and Its Variants. Atglen, Pennsylvania: Schiffer Publishing. ISBN 978-0-7643-0722-5.
