= No. 77 Squadron IAF =

No. 77 Squadron Veiled Vipers
- Crest of The No. 77 Squadron IAF "Veiled Vipers"
- Active: 05 February 2011 - Present
- Country: Republic of India
- Allegiance: Indian Armed Forces
- Branch: Indian Air Force
- Role: Special Air Operations
- Garrison/HQ: Hindon AFS
- Nickname: "Veiled Vipers"
- Motto: Kill with Stealth

Aircraft flown
- Transport: C-130J Super Hercules

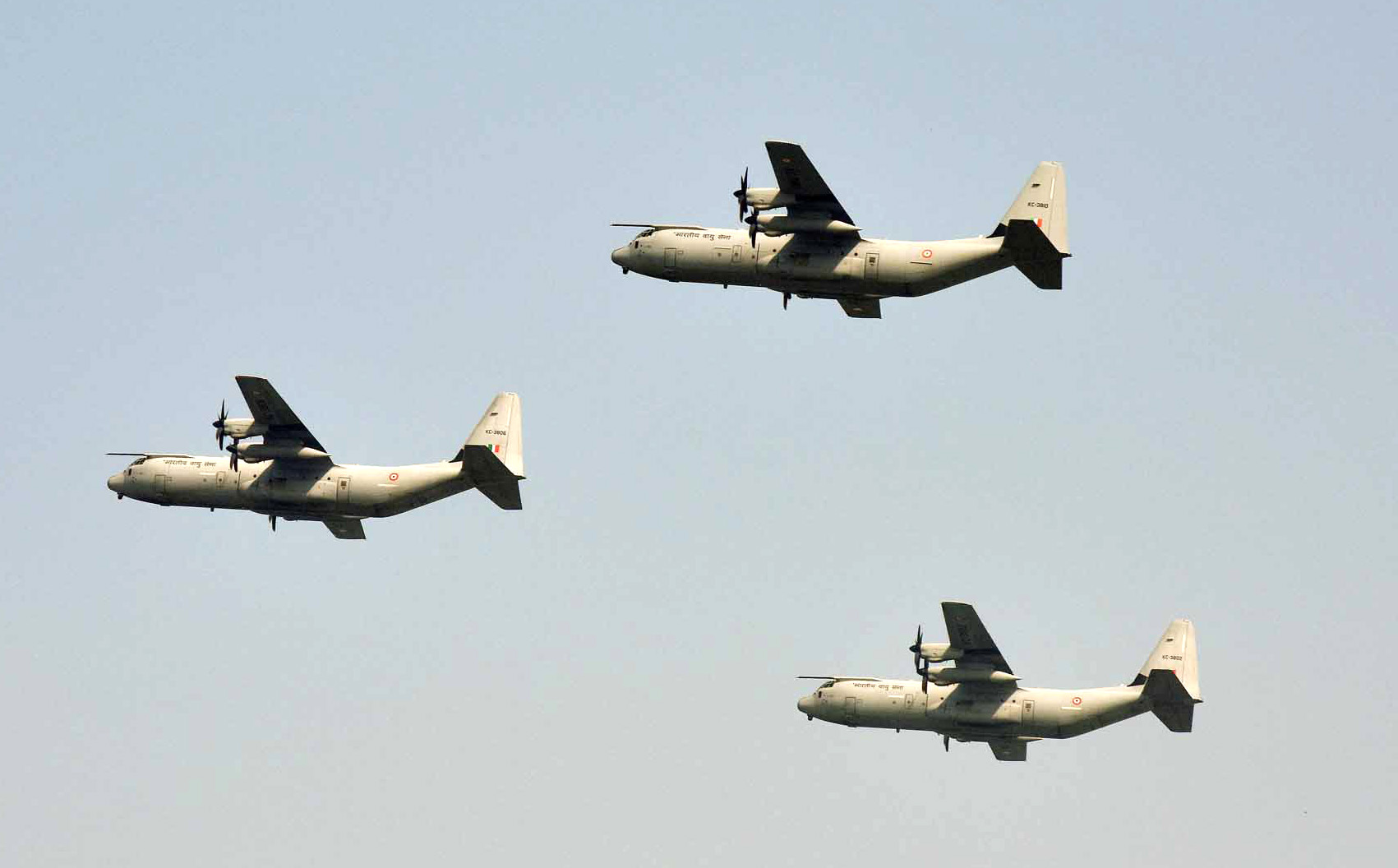
C-130Js from 'Veiled Vipers' on the Air Force Day Parade, at Hindon Air Force Station on 8 October 2018

No. 77 Squadron IAF nicknamed as Veiled Vipers is a unit of the Indian Air Force assigned to Western Air Command. This tactical airlift aircraft will be able to undertake quick deployment of Special Forces in all weather conditions, including airdrops and landings on unprepared or semi-prepared surface even in complete darkness. Capable of undertaking low-level air-to-air refueling to enhance its range, rapid forward basing of personnel and equipment in emergent situations would be one of its multifaceted roles.

== History ==
The First C-130J aircraft was received in February 2011

On 20 August 2013, the Indian Air Force performed the highest landing of a C-130J at the Daulat Beg Oldi airstrip in Ladakh at the height of 16,614 ft (5,064 m).

One crashed in 2014, which was replaced in 2019.

=== Lineage ===
- Constituted as No. 77 Squadron (Veiled Vipers) on 5 February 2011

=== Aircraft ===
- C-130J Super Hercules
