= 87th Division =

87th Division or 87th Infantry Division may refer to:

- 87th Division (National Revolutionary Army), Republic of China, National Revolutionary Army
- 87th Division (2nd Formation) (People's Republic of China)
- 87th African Infantry Division, French Army, Second World War
- 87th Territorial Infantry Division, French Army, First World War
- 87th Infantry Division (German Empire), Imperial German Army
- 87th Infantry Division (Wehrmacht), German Army
- 87th Guards Rifle Division, Soviet Union
- 87th Rifle Division, Soviet Union
- 87th Infantry Division (United States)

== See also ==
- List of military divisions by number
- 87th Brigade (disambiguation)
- 87th Regiment (disambiguation)
- 87th Squadron (disambiguation)
