= 87th Regiment =

87th Regiment or 87th Infantry Regiment may refer to:

- 87th Regiment of Foot (disambiguation), several units of the British Army
- 87th Postal and Courier Regiment RLC, a unit of the British Army
- 87th Infantry Regiment (United States), a unit of the US Army

American Civil War regiments:

- 87th Illinois Volunteer Infantry Regiment, a unit of the Union (Northern) Army
- 87th Indiana Infantry Regiment, a unit of the Union (Northern) Army
- 87th New York Volunteer Infantry, a unit of the Union (Northern) Army
- 87th Ohio Infantry, a unit of the Union (Northern) Army
- 87th Pennsylvania Infantry, a unit of the Union (Northern) Army

== See also ==
- 87th Division (disambiguation)
- 87th Squadron (disambiguation)
