= Indian Army =

Land service branch of the Indian Armed Forces

- Bhāratīya Sēnā
- Emblem of the Indian Army
- Founded: 26 January 1950; 76 years ago (in current form) 1 April 1895; 131 years ago (as British Indian Army)
- Country: India
- Type: Army
- Role: Land warfare
- Size: 1,248,000 active personnel; 900,000 reserve personnel ~310 crewed aircraft
- Part of: Indian Armed Forces
- Headquarters: Integrated Defence Headquarters, Ministry of Defence, New Delhi
- Mottos: Sevā Paramo Dharmaḥ (ISO) transl. 'Service Before Self' lit. 'Service is the eternal dharma.'
- Colours: Gold, red and black
- March: Quick: Qadam Qadam Badhaye Ja (Keep stepping forward); Slow: Samman Guard (The Guard of Honour)
- Anniversaries: Army Day: 15 January
- Engagements: See list: Large scale international conflicts; Mahdist War (1881–1899); World War I (1914–1918); World War II (1939–1945); Korean War; Wars with Afghanistan; Third Anglo-Afghan War (1919); Tirah campaign (1897–1898); Waziristan campaign (1919–1920); Wars with China; Boxer Rebellion (1899–1901); Sino-Indian War (1962); Nathu La and Cho La clashes (1967); 2020–2021 China–India skirmishes; Sri Lankan Civil War; Indian intervention in the Sri Lankan Civil War (1987–1990); Indian intervention in Maldives coup d'etat (1988); Wars with Pakistan; Indo-Pakistani War of 1947–1948; Indo-Pakistani War of 1965; Indo-Pakistani War of 1971; Siachen conflict (1984–2003); Kargil War (1999); India-Pakistan standoffs and border skirmishes; 2008 India–Pakistan standoff; 2013 India–Pakistan border skirmishes; 2014–2015 India–Pakistan border skirmishes; 2016–2018 India–Pakistan border skirmishes; 2016 Indian Line of Control strike; 2019 India–Pakistan border skirmishes; 2020–21 India–Pakistan border skirmishes; 2025 India–Pakistan border skirmishes; Minor conflicts and annexations; Expedition to Tibet (1903–1904); Annexation of Hyderabad (1948); Annexation of Goa (1961); Annexation of Dadra and Nagar Haveli (1954); Invasion of Sikkim (1975); Domestic conflicts; Insurgency in Jammu and Kashmir (1989–); Insurgency in Northeast India (1954–); Operation Golden Bird 2015; Operation Hot pursuit 2015; Operation Sunrise (2019)
- Website: indianarmy.nic.in

Commanders
- Commander-in-Chief: (India) President Droupadi Murmu
- Chief of the Army Staff (COAS): General Dhiraj Seth
- Vice Chief of the Army Staff (VCOAS): Lieutenant General Sandeep Jain
- Notable commanders: Field Marshal K. M. Cariappa; Field Marshal Sam Manekshaw; General J. N. Chaudhuri; General K. S. Thimayya

Insignia
- Flag

Aircraft flown
- Attack helicopter: HAL Rudra, HAL Prachand, Boeing AH-64 Apache
- Utility helicopter: HAL Dhruv, HAL Chetak, HAL Cheetah

The Indian Army (IA) (ISO: Bhāratīya Sēnā) is the land-based branch and largest component of the Indian Armed Forces. The president of India is the Supreme Commander of the Indian Army, and its professional head is the Chief of the Army Staff (COAS). The Indian Army was established on 1 April 1895 alongside the long established presidency armies of the East India Company, which too were absorbed into it in 1903. Some princely states maintained their own armies which formed the Imperial Service Troops which, along with the Indian Army formed the land component of the Armed Forces of the Crown of India, responsible for the defence of the Indian Empire. The Imperial Service Troops were merged into the Indian Army after independence. The units and regiments of the Indian Army have diverse histories and have participated in several battles and campaigns around the world, earning many battle and theatre honours before and after Independence.

The primary mission of the Indian Army is to ensure national security and national unity, to defend the nation from external aggression and internal threats, and to maintain peace and security within its borders. It conducts humanitarian rescue operations during natural calamities and other disturbances, such as Operation Surya Hope, and can also be requisitioned by the government to cope with internal threats. It is a major component of national power, alongside the Indian Navy and the Indian Air Force. The independent Indian army has been involved in four wars with neighbouring Pakistan and one with China. It has emerged victorious in all wars against Pakistan. Other major operations undertaken by the army include Operation Vijay, Operation Meghdoot, and Operation Cactus. The army has conducted large peacetime exercises such as Operation Brasstacks and Exercise Shoorveer, and it has also been an active participant in numerous United Nations peacekeeping missions. The Indian Army was a major force in the First and Second World Wars, particularly in the Western Front and the Middle Eastern theatre during World War I, and the South-East Asian Theatre and the East African and North African campaigns during World War II.

The Indian Army is operationally and geographically divided into seven commands, with the basic field formation being a division. The army is an all-volunteer force and comprises more than 80% of the country's active defence personnel. It is the largest standing army in the world, with 1,248,000 active troops and 960,000 reserve troops. The army has embarked on an infantry modernisation program known as Futuristic Infantry Soldier As a System (F-INSAS), and is also upgrading and acquiring new assets for its armoured, artillery, and aviation branches.

== History ==
Until the independence of India, the "Indian Army" was a British-commanded force defined as "the force recruited locally and permanently based in India, together with its expatriate British officers"; the "British Army in India" referred to British Army units posted to India for a tour of duty. The "Army of India" meant the combined Indian Army and the British Army in India.

=== Background ===
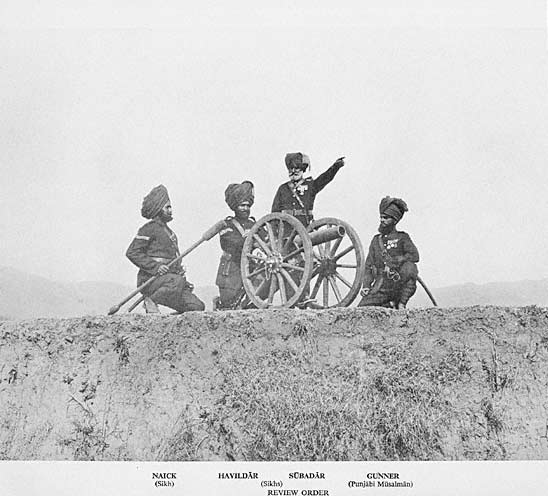
No. 4 (Hazara) Mountain Battery with RML7 pounder "Steel Gun" Mountain Gun in Review Order. Left to right Naick, Havaldar, Subadar (Sikhs) and Gunner (Punjabi Musalman) c. 1895.

In 1776, a Military Department was created within the government of the East India Company at Calcutta. Its main function was to record orders that were issued to the army by various departments of the East India Company for the territories under its control.

With the Charter Act 1833, the Secretariat of the government of the East India Company was reorganised into four departments, including a Military Department. The army in the presidencies of Bengal, Bombay and Madras functioned as respective Presidency Armies until 1 April 1895, when they were unified into a single force known as the Indian Army. For administrative convenience, it was divided into four commands, namely Punjab (including the North West Frontier), Bengal, Madras (including Burma), and Bombay (including Sind, Quetta and Aden).

The Indian Army was a critical force for maintaining the primacy of the British Empire, both in India and throughout the world. Besides maintaining internal security, the Army fought in many other theatres: Third Anglo-Afghan war; the Boxer Rebellion in China; in Abyssinia and in the First and Second World Wars.

=== World wars ===
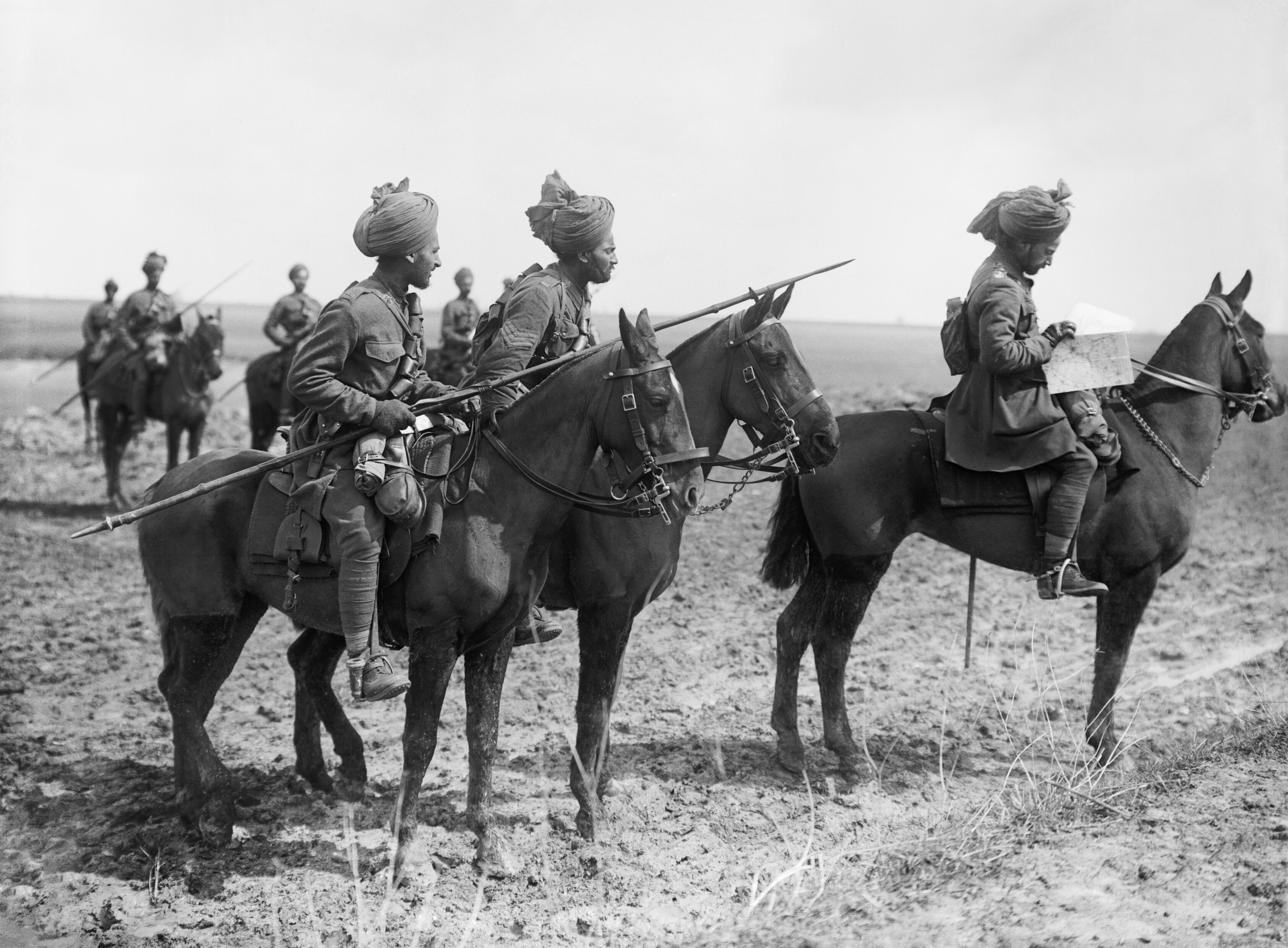
Indian Cavalry on the Western Front during World War I.

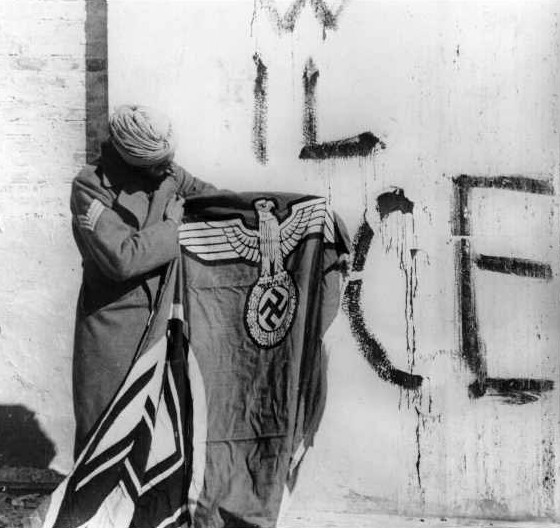
A Sikh soldier of the 4th Division (the Red Eagles) of the Indian Army, attached to the British Fifth Army in Italy. Holding a captured Nazi flag after the surrender of German forces in Italy, May 1945. Behind him, a fascist inscription says "VIVA IL DUCE", "Long live the Duce" (i.e. Mussolini).

The Kitchener Reforms brought the British Army to a new century. In the 20th century, the Indian Army was a crucial adjunct to the forces of the British Empire in both world wars. 1.3 million Indian soldiers served in World War I (1914–1918) with the Allies, in which 74,187 Indian troops were killed or missing in action. In 1915 there was a mutiny by Indian soldiers in Singapore. The United Kingdom made promises of self-governance to the Indian National Congress in return for its support but reneged on them after the war, following which the Indian Independence movement gained strength.

The "Indianisation" of the Indian Army began with the formation of the Prince of Wales Royal Indian Military College at Dehradun, in March 1912, to provide education to the scions of aristocratic and well-to-do Indian families and to prepare selected Indian boys for admission into the Royal Military College, Sandhurst. Cadets were given a King's commission, after passing out, and were posted to one of the eight units selected for Indianisation. Because of the slow pace of Indianisation, with just 69 officers being commissioned between 1918 and 1932, political pressure was applied, leading to the formation of the Indian Military Academy in 1932 and greater numbers of officers of Indian origin being commissioned. On the eve of World War II, the officer corps consisted of roughly 500 Indians holding regular commissions against approximately 3,000 British officers.

In World War II Indian soldiers fought alongside the Allies. In 1939, British officials had no plan for expansion and training of Indian forces, which comprised about 130,000 men (in addition there were 44,000 men in British units in India in 1939), whose mission was internal security and defence against a possible Soviet threat through Afghanistan. As the war progressed, the size and role of the Indian Army expanded dramatically, and troops were sent to battlefronts as soon as possible. The most serious problem was the lack of equipment. Indian units served in Burma, wherein 1944–45, five Indian divisions were engaged along with one British and three African divisions. Even larger numbers operated in the Middle East. Some 87,000 Indian soldiers died in the war. By the end of the war, it had become the largest volunteer army in history, rising to over 2.5 million men in August 1945.

In the African and Middle East campaigns, captured Indian troops were given a choice to join the German Army, to eventually "liberate" India from Britain, instead of being sent to POW camps. These men, along with Indian students who were in Germany when the war broke out, made up what was called the Free India Legion. They were originally intended as pathfinders for German forces in Asia but were soon sent to help guard the Atlantic Wall. Few who were part of the Free India Legion ever saw any combat, and very few were ever stationed outside Europe. At its height, the Free India Legion had over 3,000 troops in its ranks.

Indian POWs also joined the Indian National Army, which was allied with the Empire of Japan. It was raised by a former colonel of the Indian Army, General Mohan Singh, but was later led by Subhas Chandra Bose and Rash Bihari Bose. With the fall of Singapore in 1942, about 40,000 Indian soldiers were captured. When given the choice, over 30,000 joined the Indian National Army. Those who refused became POWs and were mostly shipped to New Guinea. After initial success, this army was defeated, along with the Japanese; but it had a huge impact on the Indian independence movement.

=== Indian independence ===
Upon the Partition of India and Indian independence in 1947, four of the ten Gurkha regiments were transferred to the British Army. The rest of the Indian Army was divided between the newly created Union of India and the Dominion of Pakistan. The Punjab Boundary Force, which had been formed to help police Punjab during the partition period, was disbanded. Headquarters Delhi and the East Punjab Command were formed to administer the area.

The departure of virtually all senior British officers following independence, and their replacement by Indian officers, meant many of the latter held acting ranks several ranks above their substantive ones. For instance, S. M. Shrinagesh, the ground-forces commander of Indian forces during the first Indo-Pak War of 1947–49 (and the future third COAS), was first an acting major-general and then an acting lieutenant-general during the conflict while holding the substantive rank of major, and only received a substantive promotion to lieutenant-colonel in August 1949. Gopal Gurunath Bewoor, the future ninth COAS, was an acting colonel at his promotion to substantive major from substantive captain in 1949, while future Lieutenant General K. P. Candeth was an acting brigadier (substantive captain) at the same time. In April 1948, the former Viceroy's Commissioned Officers (VCO) were re-designated Junior Commissioned Officers, while the former King's Commissioned Indian Officers (KCIO) and Indian Commissioned Officers (ICO), along with the former Indian Other Ranks (IOR), were respectively re-designated as Officers and Other Ranks.

Army Day is celebrated on 15 January every year in India, in recognition of Lieutenant General K. M. Cariappa's taking over as the first "Indian" chief of the army staff and commander-in-chief, Indian Army from General Sir Roy Bucher, on 15 January 1949. With effect from 26 January 1950, the date India became a republic, all active-duty Indian Army officers formerly holding the King's Commission were recommissioned and confirmed in their substantive ranks.

=== Conflicts and operations ===
==== First Kashmir War (1947) ====
Immediately after independence, tensions between India and Pakistan erupted into the first of three full-scale wars between the two nations over the then princely state of Kashmir. The Maharaja of Kashmir wanted to have a standstill position. Since Kashmir was a Muslim majority state, Pakistan wanted to make Kashmir a Pakistani territory. As a result, Pakistan invaded Kashmir on 22 October 1947, causing Maharaja Hari Singh to look to India, specifically to Lord Mountbatten of Burma, the governor-general, for help. He signed the Instrument of Accession to India on 26 October 1947. Indian troops were airlifted to Srinagar from dawn on 27 October. This contingent included General Thimayya who distinguished himself in the operation and in the years that followed became a Chief of the Indian Army. An intense war was waged across the state and former comrades found themselves fighting each other. Pakistan suffered significant losses. Its forces were stopped on the line formed which is now called the Line of Control (LOC).

An uneasy peace, sponsored by the UN, returned by the end of 1948, with Indian and Pakistani soldiers facing each other across the Line of Control, which has since divided Indian-held Kashmir from that part held by Pakistan. Several UN Security Council resolutions were passed, with Resolution 47 calling for a plebiscite to be held in Kashmir to determine accession to India or Pakistan, only after Pakistan withdrew its army from Kashmir. A precondition to the resolution was for Pakistan and India to return to a state of "as was" before the conflict. Pakistan would withdraw all tribesmen and Pakistani nationals brought in to fight in Kashmir. Pakistan refused to pull back, and there could be no further dialogue on fulfilling the UN resolution. Tensions between India and Pakistan, largely over Kashmir, have never been eliminated.

==== Annexation of Hyderabad (1948) ====
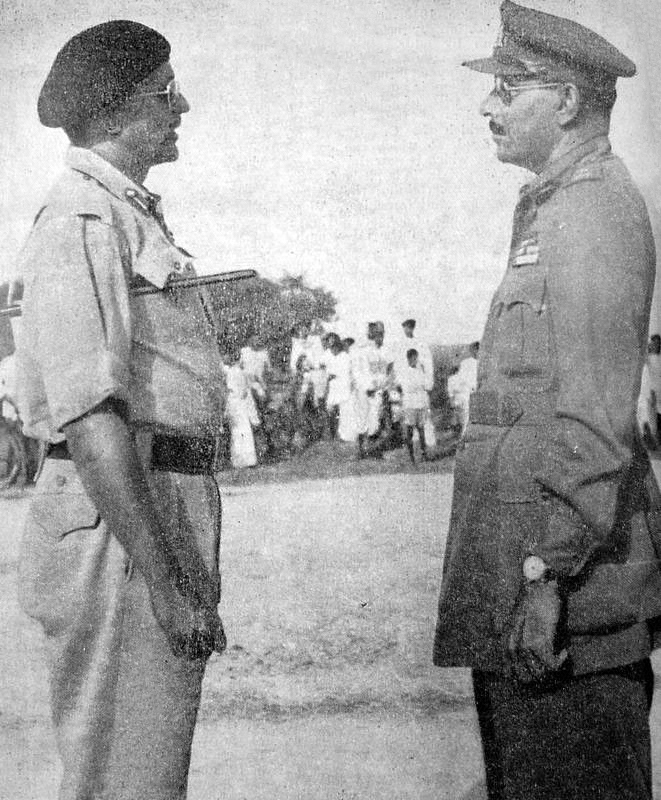
Major General El Edroos (at right) offers his surrender of the Hyderabad State Forces to Major General (later Army Chief) J.N. Chaudhuri at Secunderabad

After the partition of India, Hyderabad State, a princely state under the rule of the Nizam of Hyderabad, chose to remain independent. The ensuing stand-off between the Government of India and the Nizam ended on 12 September 1948, when India's then Deputy Prime Minister Sardar Vallabhbhai Patel ordered Indian troops to secure Hyderabad State. During five days of fighting, the Indian Army, backed by an Indian Air Force squadron of Hawker Tempest aircraft, routed the Hyderabad State forces. Five Indian Army infantry battalions and one armoured squadron were engaged in the operation. The following day, Hyderabad was proclaimed part of India. Major General Joyanto Nath Chaudhuri, who led the operation, and accepted the surrender of the Nizam's forces on 18 September 1948, was appointed the military governor of Hyderabad, to restore law and order, and served until 1949.

==== Assistance during the Korean War (1950–1953) ====
During the Korean War, although deciding against sending combat forces, India sent its 60th Parachute Field Ambulance unit to aid the UN troops fighting against the North Korean invasion of South Korea, as part of the 1st Commonwealth Division. In the aftermath of the war, an Indian infantry brigade formed the Custodian Force of India, some of whose soldiers were also part of the Neutral Nations Repatriation Commission, which assisted in the exchange of prisoners of war and was headed by Lieutenant General K. S. Thimayya.

==== Annexation of Goa, Daman and Diu (1961) ====
Even though the British and French vacated all their colonial possessions in the Indian subcontinent, Portugal refused to relinquish control of its colonies of Goa, Daman, and Diu. After repeated attempts by India to negotiate were spurned by Portuguese prime minister and dictator, António de Oliveira Salazar, on 12 December 1961 India launched Operation Vijay to capture the Portuguese colonies, which was accomplished by small contingents of Indian troops. After a brief conflict that lasted twenty-six hours—during which 31 Portuguese soldiers were killed, the Portuguese Navy frigate Afonso de Albuquerque was destroyed, and over 3,000 Portuguese were captured—Portuguese General Manuel António Vassalo e Silva surrendered to Major General Kunhiraman Palat Kandoth of the Indian Army. Goa, Daman, and Diu became a part of the Republic of India.

==== Sino-Indian War (1962) ====
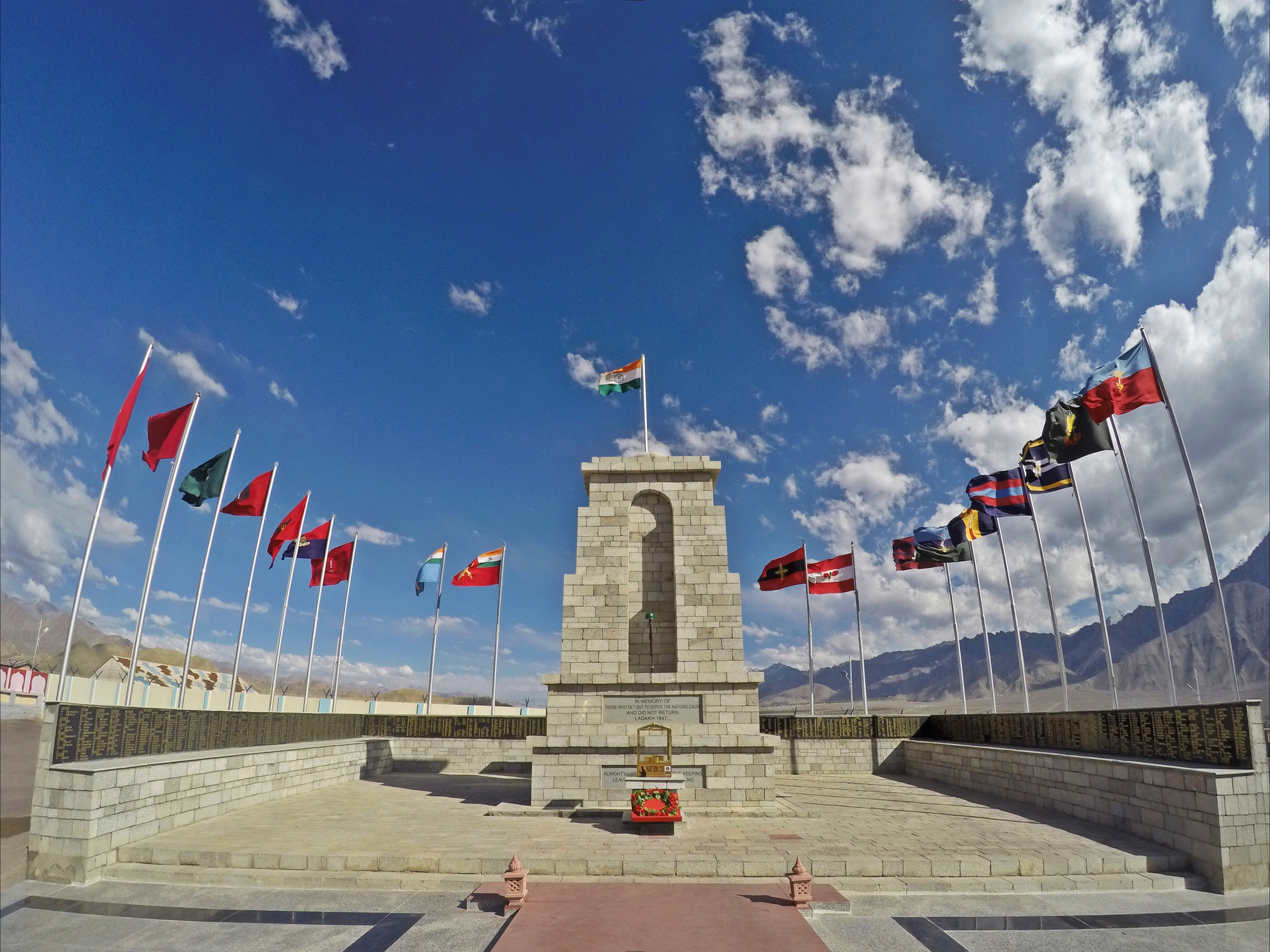
Indian Army Hall of Fame at Leh, near Indo-Tibet border

The cause of this war was a dispute over the sovereignty of the widely separated Aksai Chin and Arunachal Pradesh border regions. Aksai Chin, claimed by India as part of Kashmir, and by China as part of Xinjiang, contains an important road link that connects the Chinese regions of Tibet and Xinjiang. China's construction of this road was one of the triggers of the conflict.

Small-scale clashes between Indian and Chinese forces broke out as India insisted on the disputed McMahon Line being regarded as the international border between the two countries. Chinese troops claimed not to have retaliated to the cross-border firing by Indian troops, despite sustaining losses. China's suspicion of India's involvement in Tibet created more rifts between the two countries.

In 1962, the Indian Army was ordered to move to the Thag La ridge, located near the border between Bhutan and Arunachal Pradesh and about 5 kilometres (3 miles) north of the disputed McMahon Line. Meanwhile, Chinese troops had also made incursions into Indian-held territory, and tensions between the two reached a new high when Indian forces discovered the road constructed by China in Aksai Chin. After a series of failed negotiations, the People's Liberation Army attacked Indian Army positions on the Thag La ridge. This move by China caught India by surprise, and on 12 October Nehru gave orders for the Chinese to be expelled from Aksai Chin. However, poor coordination among various divisions of the Indian Army, and the late decision to mobilise the Indian Air Force in vast numbers, gave China a crucial tactical and strategic advantage over India. On 20 October, Chinese soldiers attacked India from both the northwest and northeast; and captured large portions of Aksai Chin and Arunachal Pradesh.

As the fighting moved beyond disputed territories, China called on the Indian government to negotiate; however, India remained determined to regain lost territory. With no agreement in sight, China unilaterally withdrew its forces from Arunachal Pradesh. The reasons for the withdrawal are disputed, with India claiming various logistical problems for China and diplomatic support from the United States, while China stated that it still held territory it had staked a claim on. The dividing line between the Indian and Chinese forces was named the Line of Actual Control.

The poor decisions made by India's military commanders, and the political leadership, raised several questions. The Henderson-Brooks and Bhagat committee was soon set up by the government of India to determine the causes of the poor performance of the Indian Army. Its report criticised the decision not to allow the Indian Air Force to target Chinese transport lines, out of fear of a Chinese aerial counterattack on Indian civilian areas. Much of the blame was placed on the then–defence minister, Krishna Menon, who resigned from his post soon after the war ended. Despite frequent calls for its release, the Henderson-Brooks report remains classified. Neville Maxwell has written an account of the war.

==== Indo-Pakistani War of 1965 ====
A second confrontation with Pakistan took place in 1965. Although the war is described as inconclusive, India had the better of the war and was the clear winner in tactical and strategic terms. Pakistani president Ayub Khan launched Operation Gibraltar in August 1965, during which Pakistani paramilitary troops infiltrated into Indian-administered Kashmir and attempted to ignite anti-India agitation in Jammu and Kashmir. Pakistani leaders believed that India, which was still recovering from the Sino-Indian War, would be unable to deal with a military thrust and a Kashmiri rebellion. India reacted swiftly and launched a counter-offensive against Pakistan. In reply, on 1 September Pakistan launched Operation Grand Slam, invading India's Chamb-Jaurian sector. In retaliation, the Indian Army launched a major offensive all along its border with Pakistan, with Lahore as its prime target.

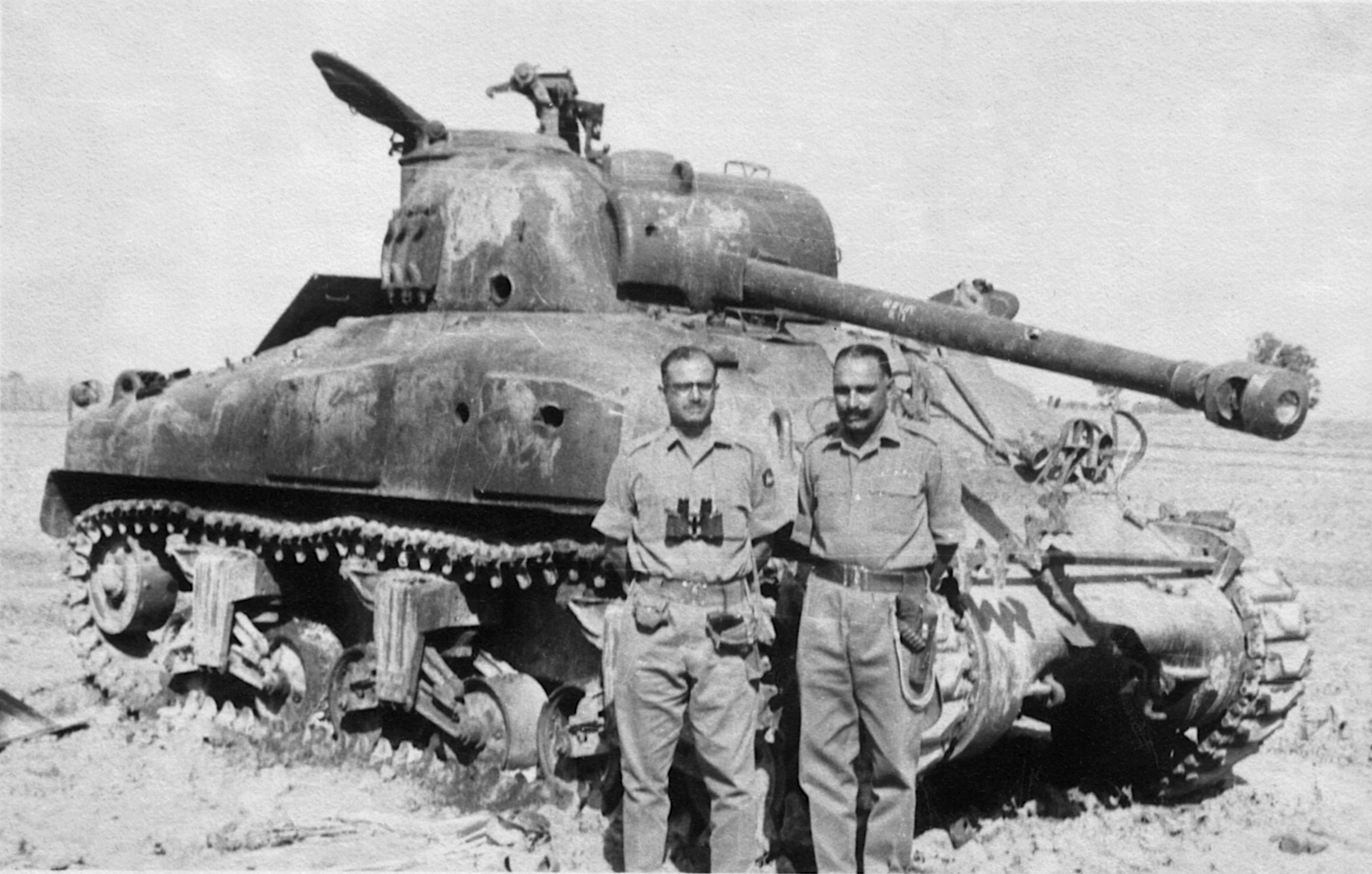
Indian Army officer next to a destroyed Pakistani Sherman tank, after the battle of Asal Uttar.

Initially, the Indian Army met with considerable success in the northern sector. After launching prolonged artillery barrages against Pakistan, India was able to capture three important mountain positions in Kashmir. By 9 September, the Indian Army had made considerable inroads into Pakistan. India had its largest haul of Pakistani tanks when an offensive by Pakistan's 1st Armoured Division was blunted at the Battle of Asal Uttar, which took place on 10 September near Khemkaran. The biggest tank battle of the war was the Battle of Chawinda, the largest tank battle in history after World War II. Pakistan's defeat at the Battle of Asal Uttar hastened the end of the conflict.

At the time of the ceasefire declaration, India reported casualties of about 3,000. On the other hand, it was estimated that more than 3,800 Pakistani soldiers were killed in the conflict. About 200–300 Pakistani tanks were either destroyed or captured by India. India lost a total of 150-190 tanks during the conflict. The decision to return to pre-war positions, following the Tashkent Declaration, caused an outcry in New Delhi. It was widely believed that India's decision to accept the ceasefire was due to political factors, not military, since it was facing considerable pressure from the United States and the United Nations to cease hostilities.

==== 1967 Sino-Indian conflict ====
The 1967 Sino-Indian skirmish, also known as the Cho La incident, was a military conflict between Indian troops and members of the Chinese People's Liberation Army who, on 1 October 1967, invaded Sikkim, which was then a protectorate of India. On 10 October, both sides clashed again. Defence minister Sardar Swaran Singh assured the Indian people that the government was taking care of developments along the border. Indian losses were 88 killed, and 163 wounded, while Chinese casualties were 300 killed and 450 wounded in Nathula, and 40 in Chola. The Chinese Army left Sikkim after this defeat.

==== Operation against the Naxalites during 1971 ====
Under Prime Minister Indira Gandhi, during the president's rule in 1971, the Indian Army and the Indian police launched Operation Steeplechase, a gigantic "counter-insurgency" operation against the Naxalites, which resulted in the death of hundreds of Naxalites and the imprisonment of more than 20,000 suspects and cadres, including senior leaders. The army was also assisted by a brigade of para commandos and the Indian paramilitary. The operation was organised in October 1969, and Lieutenant General J.F.R. Jacob was told by Govind Narain, the Home Secretary, that "there should be no publicity and no records". Jacob's request to be presented with written orders was also refused by the then Army Chief Sam Manekshaw.

==== Bangladesh Liberation War of 1971 ====
An independence movement broke out in East Pakistan which was crushed by Pakistani forces. Due to large-scale atrocities committed against them, thousands of Bengalis took refuge in neighbouring India causing a major refugee crisis there. In early 1971, India declared its full support for the Bengali freedom fighters, known as Mukti Bahini, and Indian agents were extensively involved in covert operations to aid them.

On 20 November 1971, the Indian Army moved 14 Punjab Battalion of the 45th Cavalry regiment, into Garibpur, a strategically important town in East Pakistan, near India's border, and successfully captured it. The following day, more clashes took place between Indian and Pakistani forces. Wary of India's growing involvement in the Bengali rebellion, the Pakistan Air Force (PAF) launched a preemptive strike on 10 Indian air bases—at Srinagar, Jammu, Pathankot, Amritsar, Agra, Adampur, Jodhpur, Jaisalmer, Uttarlai, and Sirsa—at 17:45 hours on 3 December. However, this aerial offensive failed to accomplish its objectives and gave India an excuse to declare a full-scale war against Pakistan the same day. By midnight, the Indian Army, accompanied by the Indian Air Force, launched a major three-pronged assault into East Pakistan. The Indian Army won several battles on the eastern front including the decisive Battle of Hilli. The operation also included a battalion-level airborne operation on Tangail, which resulted in the capitulation of all resistance within five days. India's massive early gains were attributed largely to the speed and flexibility with which Indian armoured divisions moved across East Pakistan.

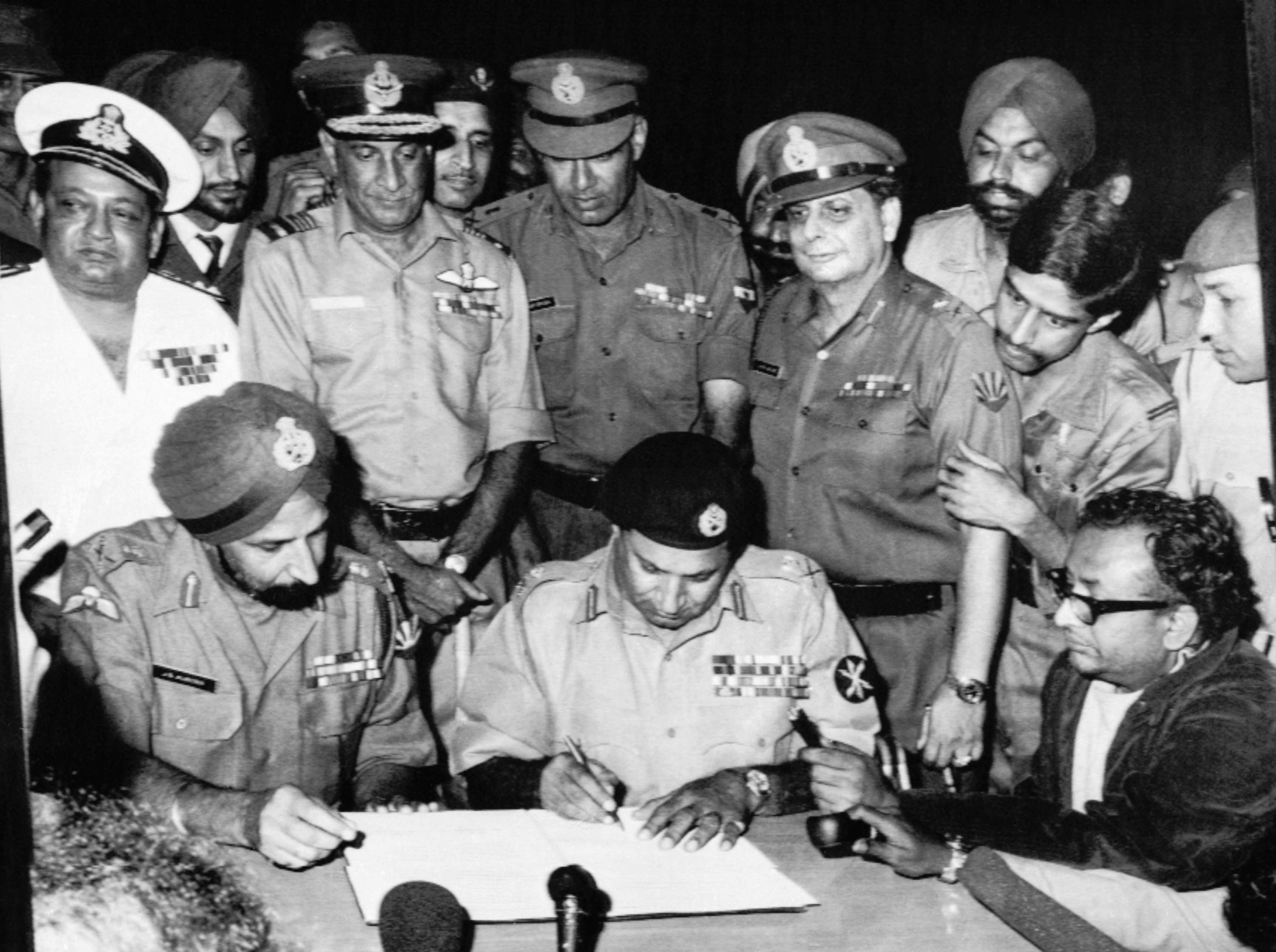
Lt Gen A A K Niazi (right), commander of the Pakistani Eastern Command, signing the Instrument of Surrender under the gaze of Lt Gen J S Arora.

Pakistan launched a counterattack against India on the western front. On 4 December 1971, A Company of the 23rd Battalion of India's Punjab Regiment intercepted the Pakistani 51st Infantry Brigade near Ramgarh, Rajasthan. The Battle of Longewala ensued, during which A Company, though outnumbered, thwarted the Pakistani advance until the Indian Air Force directed its fighters to engage the Pakistani tanks. By the time the battle had ended, 38 Pakistani tanks and 100 armoured vehicles were either destroyed or abandoned. About 200 Pakistani troops were killed in action, while only two Indian soldiers died. Pakistan suffered another major defeat on the western front at the Battle of Basantar, which was fought from 4 to 16 December. During the battle, about 66 Pakistani tanks were destroyed and 40 more were captured. Pakistani forces destroyed only 11 Indian tanks. By 16 December, Pakistan had lost sizeable territory on both the eastern and western fronts.

On 16 December 1971, under the command of Lt. General J. S. Arora, elements of the three corps of the Indian Army that had invaded East Pakistan entered Dhaka as a part of the Indo-Bangladesh allied force and forced Pakistani forces to surrender, one day after the conclusion of the Battle of Basantar. After Pakistan's Lt General A. A. K. Niazi signed the Instrument of Surrender, India, as a part of the allied forces, took more than 90,000 Pakistani prisoners of war. By the time of the signing, 11,000 Pakistani soldiers had been killed in action, while India suffered 3,500 battle-related deaths. In addition, Pakistan lost 220 tanks during the battle compared to India's 69.

In 1972, the Simla Agreement was signed between the two countries, although subsequent incidences of heightened tensions have resulted in continued military vigilance on both sides.

==== Siachen conflict (1984) ====
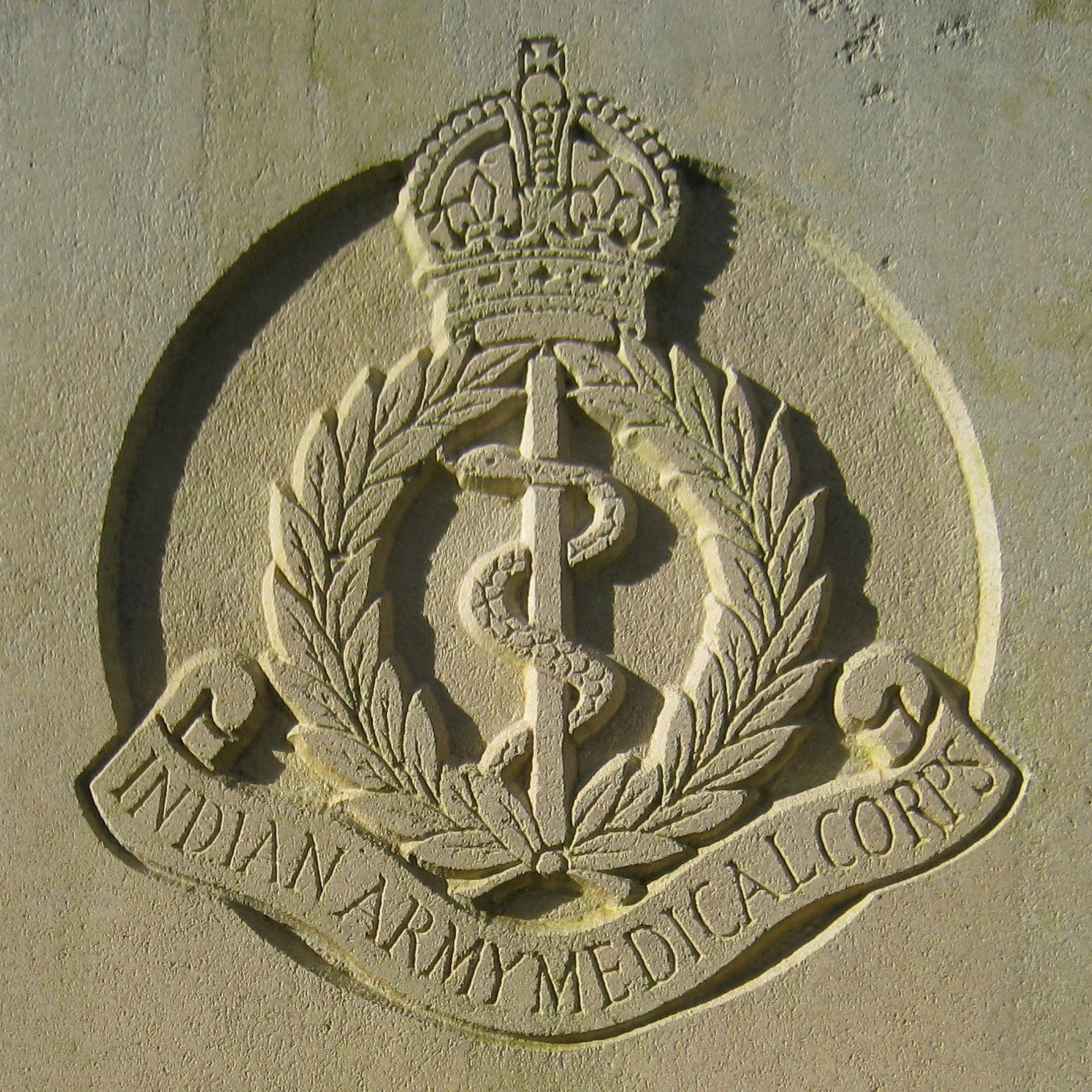
A memorial for the 22 Indian Army Medical Corps at the War Cemetery in Taiping, Perak

The Siachen Glacier, although a part of the Kashmir region, was not demarcated on maps prepared and exchanged between the two sides in 1947. In consequence, before the 1980s neither India nor Pakistan maintained a permanent military presence in the region. However, beginning in the 1950s, Pakistan began sending mountaineering expeditions to the glacier. By the early 1980s, the Government of Pakistan was granting special expedition permits to mountaineers and United States Army maps showed Siachen as a part of Pakistan. This practice gave rise to the term oropolitics.

India, possibly irked by these developments, launched Operation Meghdoot in April 1984. An entire battalion of the Kumaon Regiment was airlifted to the glacier. Pakistani forces responded quickly, and clashes between the two followed. The Indian Army secured the strategic Sia La and Bilafond La mountain passes, and by 1985 more than 2,600 km^{2} (1,000 sq mi) of territory claimed by Pakistan was under Indian control. The Indian Army continues to control all of the Siachen Glacier and its tributary glaciers. Pakistan has made several unsuccessful attempts to regain control over Siachen. In late 1987, Pakistan mobilised about 8,000 troops and garrisoned them near Khapalu, aiming to capture Bilafond La. However, they were repulsed by Indian Army personnel guarding Bilafond. During the battle, about 23 Indian soldiers lost their lives, while more than 150 Pakistani troops perished. Further unsuccessful attempts to reclaim positions were launched by Pakistan in 1990, 1995, 1996, and 1999, most notably in Kargil in the latter year.

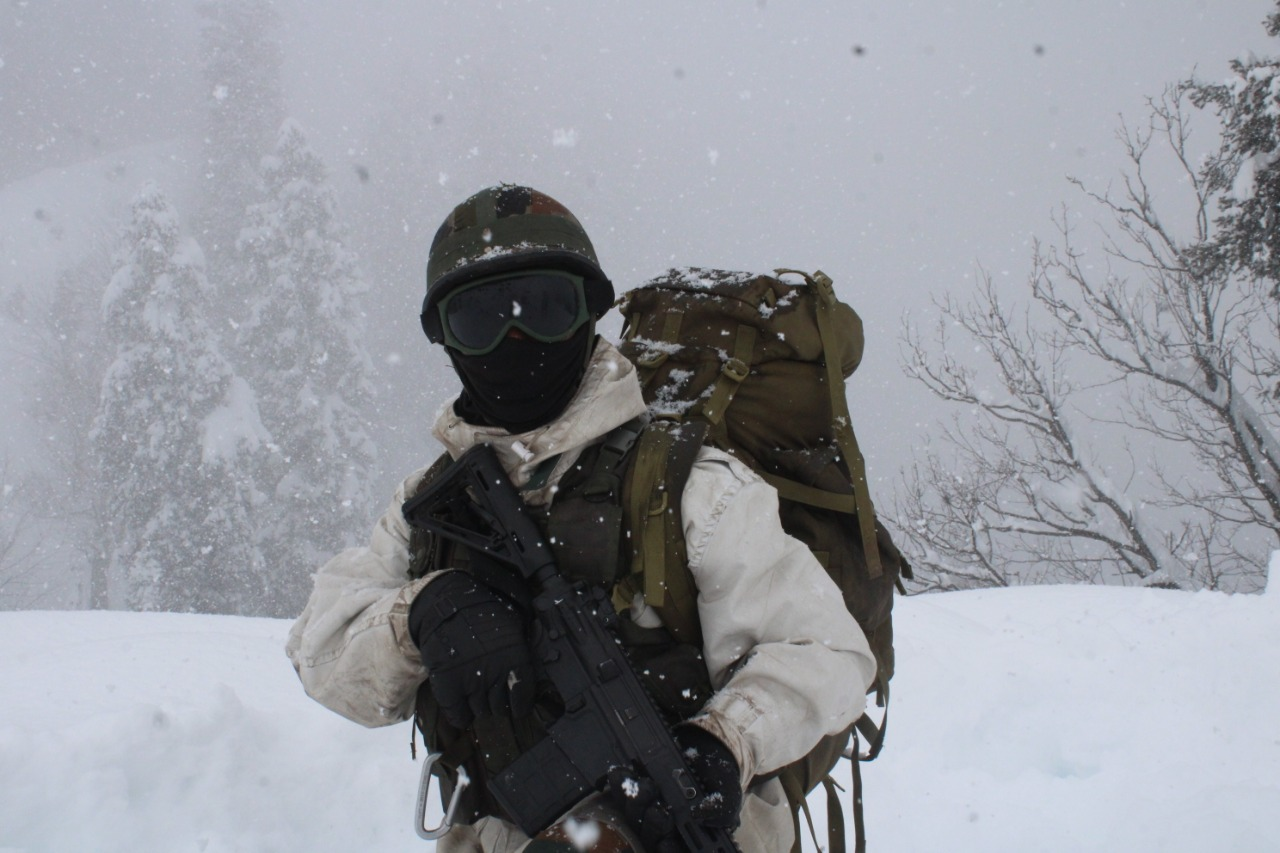
An Indian Army soldier, part of a patrolling group, in snow camouflage holding a SIG 716i.

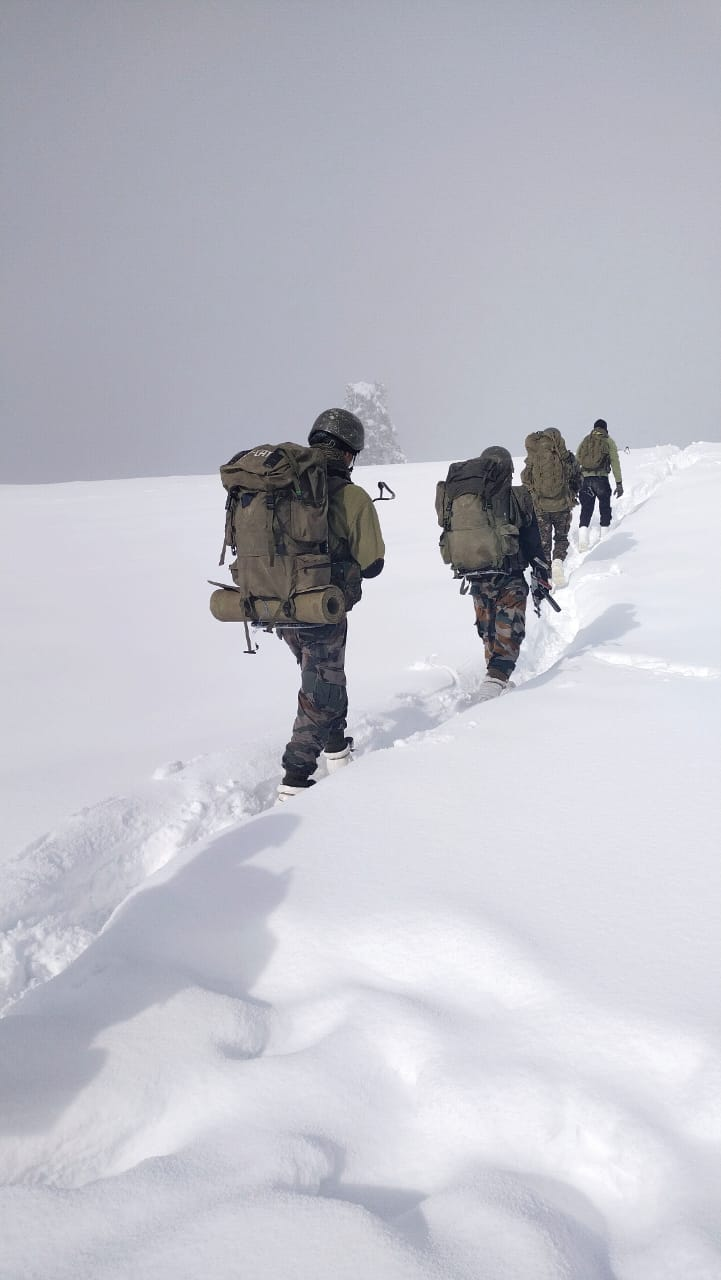
Indian Army soldiers patrolling snow clad mountain range.

India continues to maintain a strong military presence in the region, despite inhospitable conditions. The conflict over Siachen is regularly cited as an example of mountain warfare. The highest peak in the Siachen Glacier region, Saltoro Kangri, could be viewed as strategically important for India because of its height, which would enable Indian forces to monitor Pakistani or Chinese movements in the area. Maintaining control over Siachen poses several logistical challenges for the Indian Army. Several infrastructure projects were constructed in the region, including a helipad at an elevation of 6,400 m (21,000 ft). In 2004, the Indian Army was spending an estimated US$2 million a month to support its personnel stationed in the region.

==== Counter-insurgency activities ====
The Indian Army has played a crucial role in fighting insurgents and terrorists within the nation. The army launched Operation Blue Star and Operation Woodrose in the 1980s to combat Sikh insurgents. The army, along with some paramilitary forces, has the prime responsibility of maintaining law and order in the troubled Jammu and Kashmir region, under Northern Command. The Indian Army sent a contingent to Sri Lanka in 1987 as a part of the Indian Peace Keeping Force. The Indian Army also successfully conducted Operation Golden Bird in 1995, as a counter-insurgency operation in northeast India.

==== Kargil war (1999) ====
In 1998, India carried out nuclear tests; and a few days later, Pakistan responded with nuclear tests of its own, giving both countries nuclear deterrence capability, although India had tested a hydrogen bomb, which Pakistan lacked. Diplomatic tensions eased after the Lahore Summit was held in 1999. However, the sense of optimism was short-lived. In mid-1999, Pakistani paramilitary forces and Kashmiri insurgents captured the deserted, but strategic, Himalayan heights in the Kargil district of India. These had been vacated by the Indian Army during the onset of the inhospitable winter and were to be reoccupied in spring. The troops that took control of these areas received important support, of both arms and supplies, from Pakistan. Some of the heights under their control, which also included the Tiger Hill, overlooked the vital Srinagar–Leh Highway (NH 1A), Batalik, and Dras.

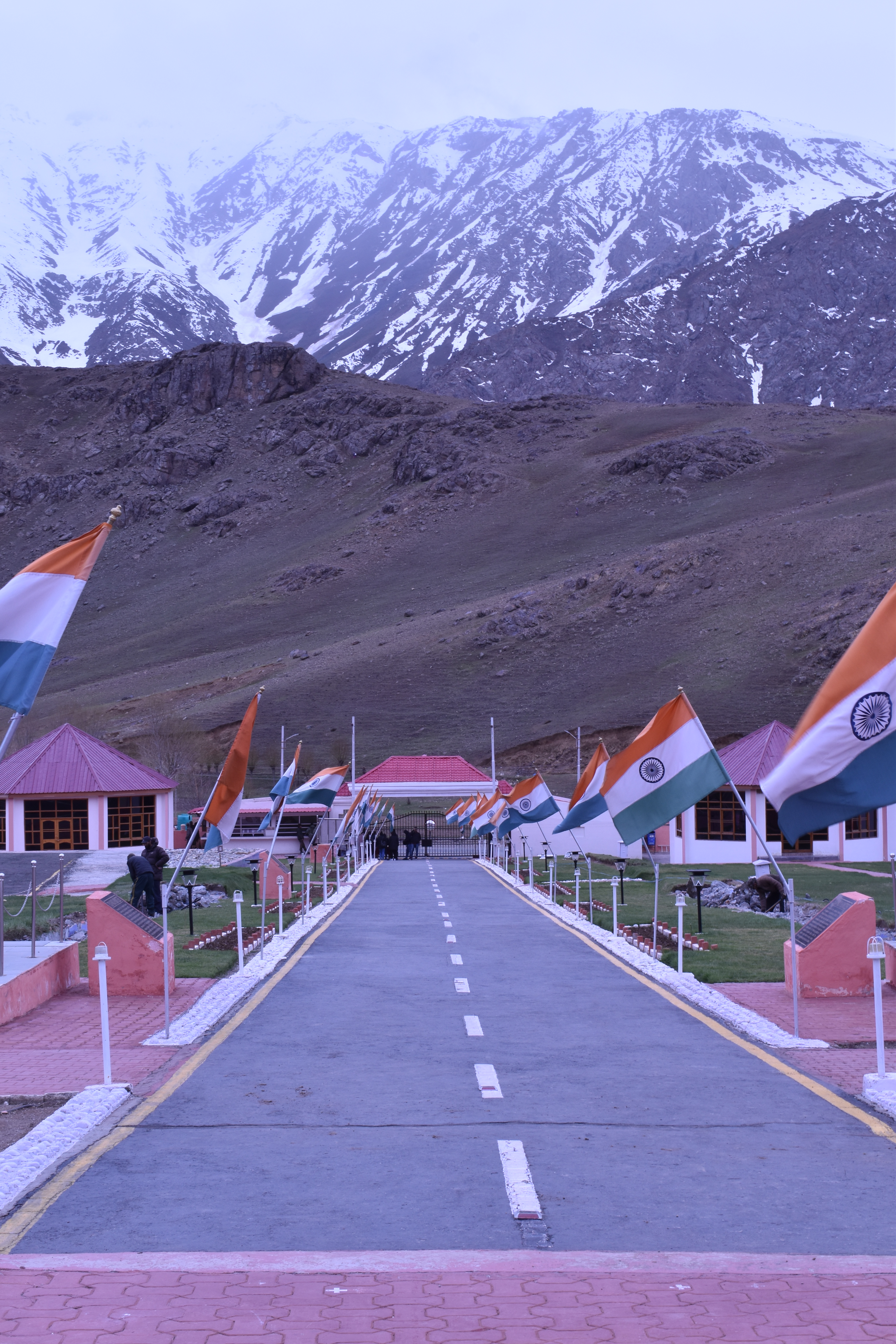
Kargil War Memorial looking at National Highway 1 from the foot of Tololing

Once the scale of the Pakistani incursion was realised, the Indian Army quickly mobilised about 200,000 troops, and Operation Vijay was launched. However, since the heights were under Pakistani control, India was at a clear strategic disadvantage. From their observation posts, the Pakistani forces had a clear line-of-sight to lay down indirect artillery fire on NH 1A, inflicting heavy casualties on the Indians. This was a serious problem for the Indian Army as the highway was its main supply route. Thus, the Indian Army's priority was to recapture peaks near NH 1A. This resulted in Indian troops first targeting the Tiger Hill and Tololing complex in Dras. This was soon followed by more attacks on the Batalik–Turtok sub-sector, which provided access to Siachen Glacier. Point 4590, which had the nearest view of the NH 1A, was successfully recaptured by Indian forces on 14 June.

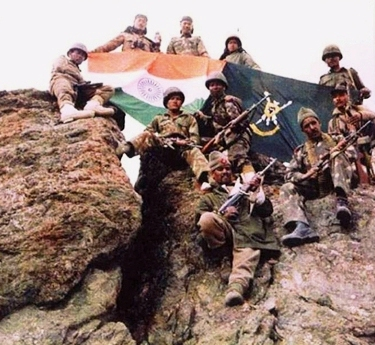
Indian soldiers after winning a battle during the Kargil War.

Though most of the posts in the vicinity of the highway were cleared of the enemy by mid-June, some posts near Dras endured sporadic shelling until the end of the war. Once the NH 1A area was cleared, the Indian Army turned to drive the invading force back across the Line of Control. The Battle of Tololing, among others, slowly tilted the war in India's favour. Nevertheless, some Pakistani posts put up a stiff resistance, including Tiger Hill (Point 5140), which fell only later in the war. As the operation was fully underway, about 250 artillery guns were brought in to clear the infiltrators in posts that were in the line-of-sight. At many vital points, neither artillery nor air power could dislodge the Pakistan soldiers, who were out of visible range. The Indian Army mounted some direct frontal ground assaults, which were slow and took a heavy toll, given the steep ascents that had to be made on peaks as high as 5,500 m (18,000 ft). Two months into the conflict, Indian troops had slowly retaken most of the ridges they had lost. According to official accounts, an estimated 75%–80% of the enemy-occupied area, and nearly all the high ground, was back under Indian control.

Following the Washington Accord of 4 July, where Sharif agreed to withdraw Pakistani troops, most of the fighting came to a gradual halt; but some Pakistani forces remained in positions on the Indian side of the LOC. In addition, the United Jihad Council (an umbrella group for all extremists) rejected Pakistan's plan for a draw-down, deciding instead to fight on. The Indian Army launched its final attacks in the last week of July. As soon as the Dras sub-sector had been cleared of Pakistani forces, the fighting ceased on 26 July, which has since been celebrated as Kargil Vijay Diwas (Kargil Victory Day) in India. By the end of the war, India had resumed control of all the territory south and east of the Line of Control, as was established in July 1972 per the Shimla Accord. By the time all hostilities had ended, the number of Indian soldiers killed during the conflict stood at 527, while more than 700 regular members of the Pakistani Army had been killed. The number of Islamist fighters, also known as Mujahideen, killed by Indian armed forces during the conflict stood at about 3,000.

==== 2016 Surgical Strikes on Kashmir and the 2016–2018 India-Pakistan conflict ====
On 18 September 2016, a fedayeen attack was made by four armed militants on an army base near the town of Uri. Nineteen Indian Army soldiers were killed. India accused Jaish-e-Muhammad, a Pakistan-based terrorist organisation. On 29 September 2016, the India Army announced that it conducted "surgical strikes" against militant launch pads across the Line of Control, in Pakistani-administered Kashmir, and inflicted "significant casualties". Indian media reported the casualty figures variously from 35 to 70 killed. Partial footage of the strikes was released to the Indian media on 27 June 2018 as proof of the strike. The incident triggered the 2016–2018 India-Pakistan border conflict, which ended on 16 June 2018 with both India and Pakistan agreeing on a ceasefire.

==== 2019 India–Pakistan border skirmishes ====
Following the 2019 Pulwama attack in Jammu and Kashmir, which killed 40 Indian Central Reserve Police Force personnel. Responsibility for the attack was claimed by a Pakistan-based militant group, Jaish-e-Mohammed. India blamed Pakistan for the attack and promised a robust response, while the latter condemned the attack and denied having any connection to it.

Twelve days later, in the early morning of 26 February 2019, India carried out a cross-border airstrike near Balakot, Khyber Pakhtunkhwa, Pakistan.

After over a month-long skirmish, both Indian Prime Minister Narendra Modi and Pakistani Prime Minister Imran Khan agreed on a peace offer on 22 March 2019 ending hostilities and vowed to fight against terrorism together.

==== United Nations peacekeeping missions ====
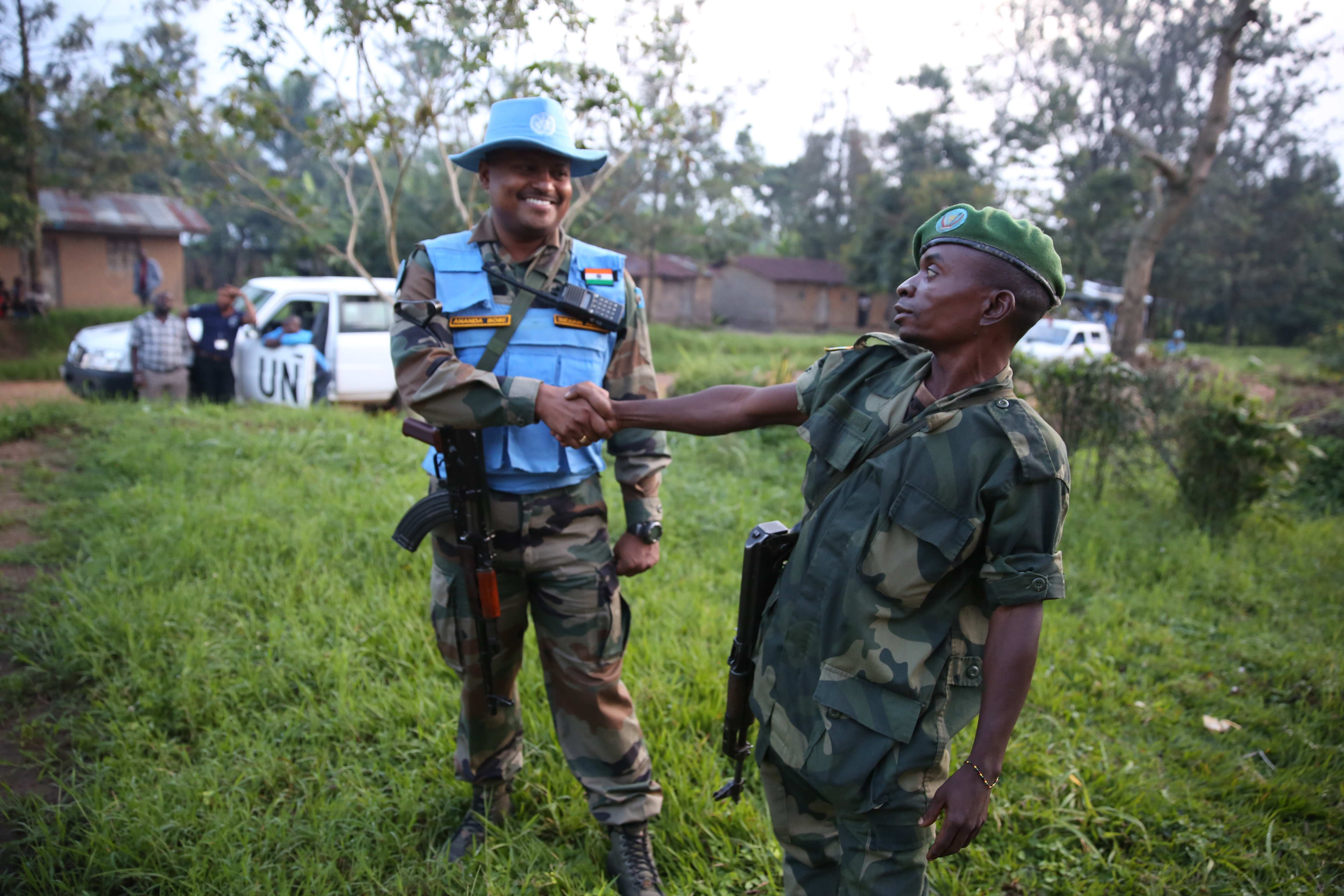
An Indian Army peacekeeper and an FARDC soldier shake hands and encourage each other

India has been the largest troop contributor to UN peacekeeping missions since its inception. So far, India has taken part in 43 Peacekeeping missions, with a total contribution exceeding 160,000 troops and a significant number of police personnel having been deployed. In 2014, India was the third largest troop contributor (TCC), with 7,860 personnel deployed, of which 995 were police personnel, including the first UN Female Formed Police Unit, serving with ten UN peacekeeping missions. As of 30 June 2014, 157 Indians have been killed during such missions. The Indian army has also provided paramedical units to facilitate the withdrawal of the sick and wounded.

=== Major exercises ===
==== Operation Brasstacks ====
Operation Brasstacks was launched by the Indian Army in November 1986 to simulate a full-scale war on India's western border. The exercise was the largest ever conducted in India; it included nine infantry, three mechanised, three armoured divisions, and one air assault division, as well as three independent armoured brigades. Amphibious assault exercises were also conducted with the Indian Navy. Brasstacks also allegedly incorporated nuclear attack drills. It led to tensions with Pakistan and a subsequent rapprochement in mid-1987.

==== Exercise Nomadic Elephant ====
Since 2004, and every year since, the Indian Army has been conducting training exercises with the Mongolian Army. In 2012, the exercise took place in Belgaum; in June 2013, it was held in Mongolia. The aim of the exercises is to enhance counterinsurgency and counter-terrorism operations, and to train in conducting peacekeeping operations under the mandate of the United Nations.

==== Exercise Ashwamedha ====
Indian Army tested its network-centric warfare capabilities in the Ashwamedha exercise. The exercise was held in the Thar desert, and over 300,000 troops participated. Asymmetric warfare capability was also tested by the Indian Army during the exercise.

==== Exercise Yudh Abhyas ====
Yudh Abhyas 2012 – US and Indian Army military exercise video trailer

Indian Army Aviation Corps Dhruv helicopter ferrying U.S. soldiers during the Yudh Abhyas training exercise in 2009

The Yudh Abhyas exercise is an ongoing series, since 2005 of joint exercises between the Indian and United States armies, agreed upon under the New Framework of the India-US Defence Relationship. Commencing at the platoon level, the exercise has graduated to a command post (CPX) and field training exercise (FTX).

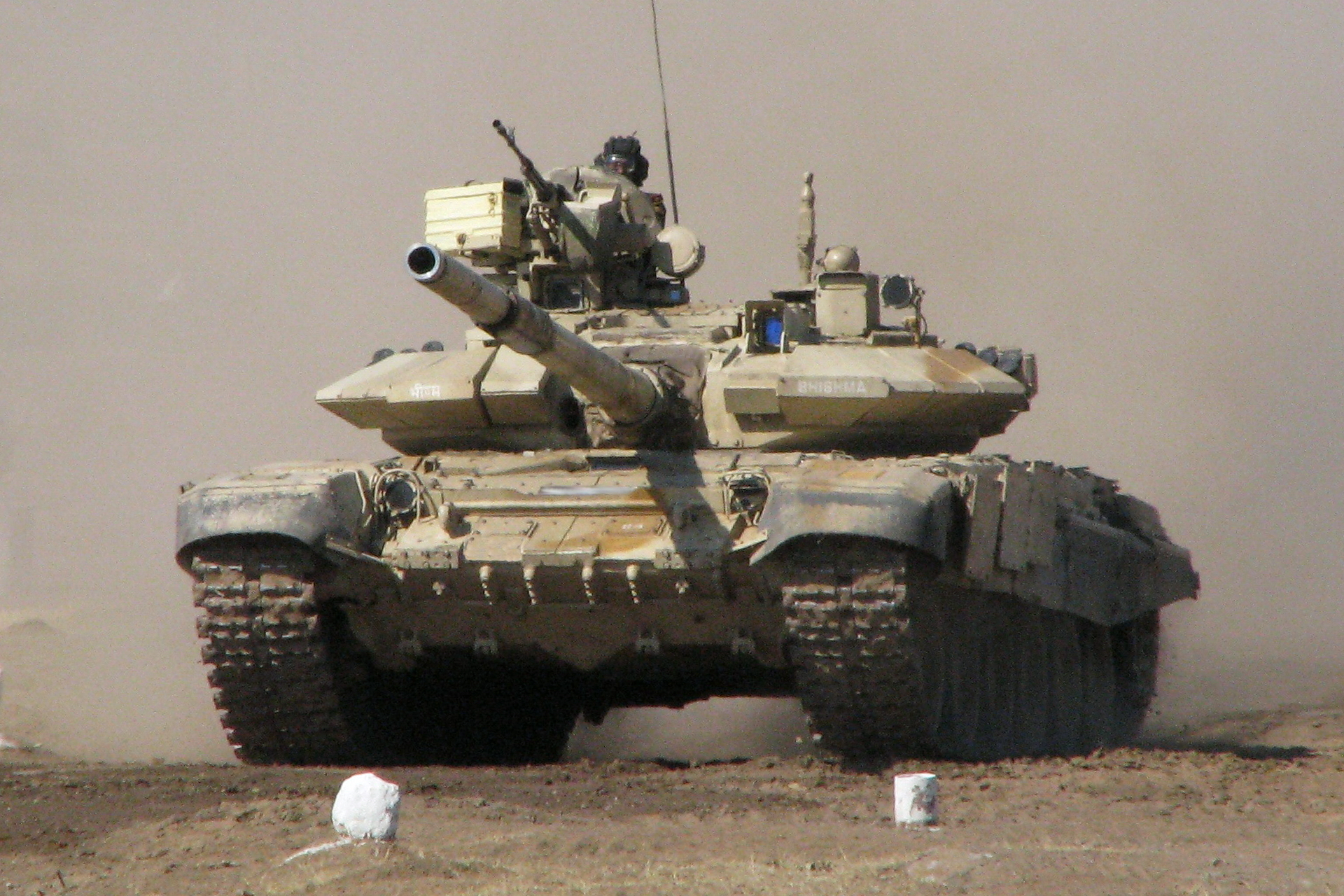
Indian army armoured vehicles during Yudh Abhyas exercises

The seventh edition of Yudh Abhyas began on 5 March 2012, in two locations under the Southwestern Command. The US Army contingent is from the US Army Pacific (USARPAC), part of the United States Pacific Command (USPACOM). The command post exercise has an engineer brigade headquarters, with its planners drawn from both countries, while the field training exercise comprises troops of the United States' 2nd Squadron, 14th Cavalry Regiment, from the 25th Infantry Division, Hawaii, along with a Stryker platoon, and a similarly sized Indian Army contingent of mechanised infantry. Several key surveillance, communications, and IED detection and neutralisation technologies, available to both sides, were fielded in the exercise.

The eighth edition of Yudh Abhyas was conducted from 3 to 17 May 2013 as a U.S.-Army-Pacific-sponsored bilateral training exercise with the Indian Army, an exercise that focused on the two countries' cultures, weapons training, and tactics. Units from the United States included the 1st Brigade Combat Team, 82nd Airborne Division, from Fort Bragg, N.C., and the 3rd Squadron, 73rd Cavalry Regiment. Units from India were the Indian Army's 99th Mountain Brigade; the 2nd Battalion, 5th Gurka Rifles; the 50th Independent Parachute Brigade; and the 54th Engineers Regiment.

==== Exercise Shakti ====
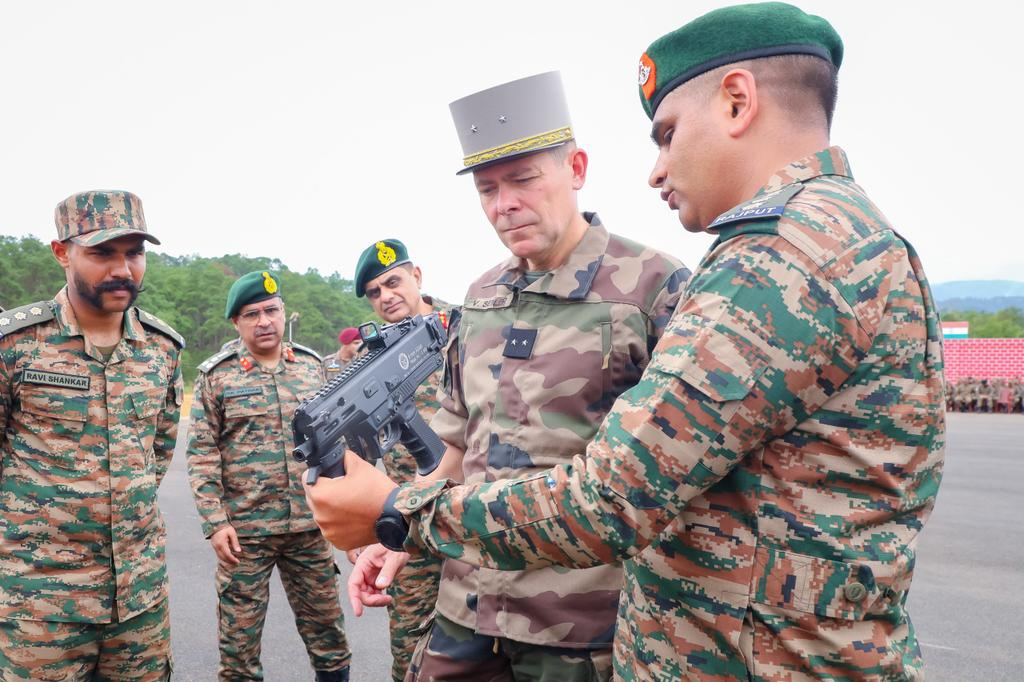
Indian Army showcasing ASMI to French soldier during Exercise Shakti

The Shakti exercise is an ongoing series, since 2011, of joint exercises between the Indian and French armies. The exercise is conducted to practice and validate anti-terrorist operations in snowbound and mountainous areas. The first joint exercise was held in India in October 2011 and the second one in September 2013. The theme of the exercise is to conduct joint platoon-level counter-insurgency operations in high-altitude mountainous terrain under the UN Charter, thus emphasising the shared concerns of both countries regarding global terrorism. An added aim of the exercise is to qualitatively enhance knowledge of each other's military procedures, thus increasing the scope for interoperability and the ability to respond to a common threat. The twelve-day exercise with the French Army is scheduled to be conducted in multiple modules in order to achieve complete integration between the two contingents at every stage.

==== Exercise Shoorveer ====
From the first week of April to the first week of May 2012, the Indian Army launched a massive summer exercise in the Rajasthan desert, involving over 50,000 troops and several hundred artillery pieces and infantry combat vehicles, as part of its efforts to shore up its battle worthiness on the western front, the border with Pakistan. The exercise, code-named "Shoorveer", was being conducted by the Jaipur-based South Western Command. This was the largest ever exercise conducted by the Indian army since 1947. The collective training started with the honing of basic battle procedures and tactical drills.

Several field firings were carried out to check the accuracy and lethality of weapon systems. Many innovations, adopted by units and formations to enhance combat power, were tested in the field. The troops built on the training momentum gradually, with increasing combat tempo, to set the stage for a major joint army–air force exercise in the latter part of the exercise.

==== Exercise Rudra Akrosh ====
In May 2012, the Indian Army conducted several war games aimed (according to officials) at validating "the operational and transformational effectiveness of various formations under the Western Army Command". The exercise involved approximately 20,000 troops and support from the Indian Air Force.

==== Exercise Shatrujeet ====
In April 2016, the Indian Army conducted a major exercise called Shatrujeet, with the elite Mathura-based Strike Corps in the desert area of the Mahajan Field Firing Range in Rajasthan, whose object was to evaluate the capability to strike deep into enemy territory, to deliver a quick, lethal strike against the enemy in an integrated air-land battle environment, with co-ordination among all the forces in a nuclear, biological, and chemical warfare scenario.

== Mission and doctrine ==
Initially, the army's main objective was to defend the nation's frontiers. However, over the years, the army has also taken up the responsibility of providing internal security, especially against insurgencies in Kashmir and Northeast India. Currently, the army is also looking at enhancing its special forces capabilities. With India's increasing international role, and the requirement to protect its interests in far-off countries becoming important, the Indian Army and the Indian Navy are jointly planning to set up a marine brigade.

The current combat doctrine of the Indian Army is based on effectively utilising holding formations and strike formations. In the case of an attack, the holding formations would contain the enemy and strike formations would counter-attack to neutralise enemy forces. In the case of an Indian attack, the holding formations would pin enemy forces down, whilst the strike formations would attack at a point of India's choosing. The Indian Army is large enough to devote several corps to the strike role.

== Organisation ==
=== Leadership ===
Leadership at Army Headquarters
Appointment	Appointee
Chief of the Army Staff	General Dhiraj Seth, PVSM, UYSM, AVSM
Vice Chief of Army Staff	Lieutenant General Sandeep Jain, AVSM, SM
Deputy Chief of Army Staff (Strategy)	Lieutenant General Rajiv Ghai, SYSM, UYSM, AVSM, SM***
Deputy Chief of the Army Staff (Information Systems and Training)	Lieutenant General Vipul Shinghal, AVSM, SM
Deputy Chief of Army Staff (Capability Development and Sustenance)	Lieutenant General Shamsher Singh Virk, AVSM, SM
Adjutant General	Lieutenant General VPS Kaushik, PVSM, UYSM, YSM, SM
Military Secretary	Lieutenant General Rashim Bali, PVSM, UYSM, AVSM, SM, VSM
Quartermaster General	Lieutenant General Prashant Srivastava, UYSM, AVSM, SM
Master General Sustenance	Lieutenant General Amardeep Singh Aujla, PVSM, UYSM, YSM, SM, VSM
Engineer-in-Chief	Lieutenant General Vikas Rohella, AVSM, SM**

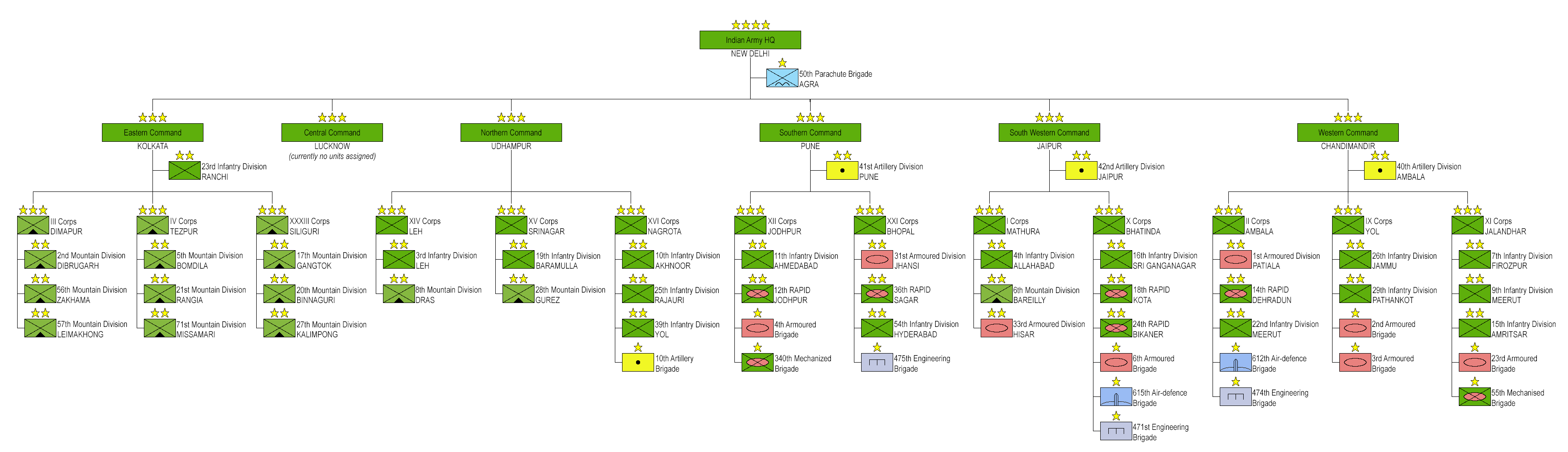
Indian Army Structure (click to enlarge)

The troops are organized into 40 Divisions in 14 Corps. Army headquarters is located in the Indian capital, New Delhi, and it is under the overall command of the Chief of Army Staff (COAS).

=== Command structure ===
The army operates six operational commands and one training command. Each command is headed by general officer commanding-in-chief with the rank of lieutenant general. Each command directly reports to Army HQ in New Delhi. These commands are given below in order of creation, with location (city) and commanders listed. There is also the Army Training Command (ARTRAC).

Six static formations called Areas are also part of the operational commands, alongside corps and divisions. These are Delhi Area, Dakshin Bharat Area, Madhya Bharat Area, Uttar Bharat Area, Maharashtra, Gujarat & Goa Area and 101 Area.

Insignia	Name	Headquarters	Army Commander	Few of known Subordinate Unit(s)/ Formation(s)
	Headquarters, Indian Army	New Delhi		50th Independent Parachute Brigade
	Central Command	Lucknow	Lieutenant General Sanjay Mitra	6th Mountain Division
	Eastern Command	Kolkata	Lieutenant General V. M. Bhuvana Krishnan	III Corps; 2nd Mountain Division –; 57th Mountain Division; 56th Infantry Division; IV Corps; 71st Mountain Division; 5th Mountain Division; 21st Mountain Division; XXXIII Corps; 17th Mountain Division; 20th Mountain Division; 27th Mountain Division; XVII Corps; 59th Infantry Division; 72 Infantry Division**
	Northern Command	Udhampur	Lieutenant General Pratik Sharma	XIV Corps; 3rd Infantry Division; 8th Mountain Division; XV Corps; 19th Infantry Division, 28th Mountain Division; XVI Corps; 10th Infantry Division; 25th Infantry Division; 39th Infantry Division; 10 Artillery brigade; I Corps; 4th Infantry Division; 23rd Infantry Division; 33rd Armoured Division
	Southern Command	Pune	Lieutenant General Rajesh Pushkar	41st Artillery Division; XII Corps; 4th Armoured Brigade; 340th Mechanised Brigade; 11th Infantry Division; 12th RAPID; XXI Corps; 31st Armoured Division; 36th RAPID; 54th Infantry Division; 475th Engineering Brigade
	South Western Command	Jaipur	Lieutenant General Mohit Malhotra	42nd Artillery Division; X Corps; 16th Infantry Division; 18th RAPID; 24th RAPID; 6th Independent Armoured Brigade; 615th Independent Air Defence Brigade; 471st Engineering Brigade
	Western Command	Chandimandir	Lieutenant General Pushpendra Pal Singh	40th Artillery Division; II Corps; 1st Armoured Division; 14th RAPID; 22nd Infantry Division; 474th Engineering Brigade; 612th Mechanised Independent Air Defence Brigade; IX Corps; 26th Infantry Division; 29th Infantry Division; 2nd Independent Armoured Brigade; 3rd Independent Armoured Brigade; XI Corps; 7th Infantry Division; 9th Infantry Division; 15th Infantry Division; 23rd Armoured Brigade; 55th Mechanised Brigade
	Army Training Command	Shimla	Lieutenant General Shrinjay Pratap Singh	Army Training Establishments

=== Combat Arms ===
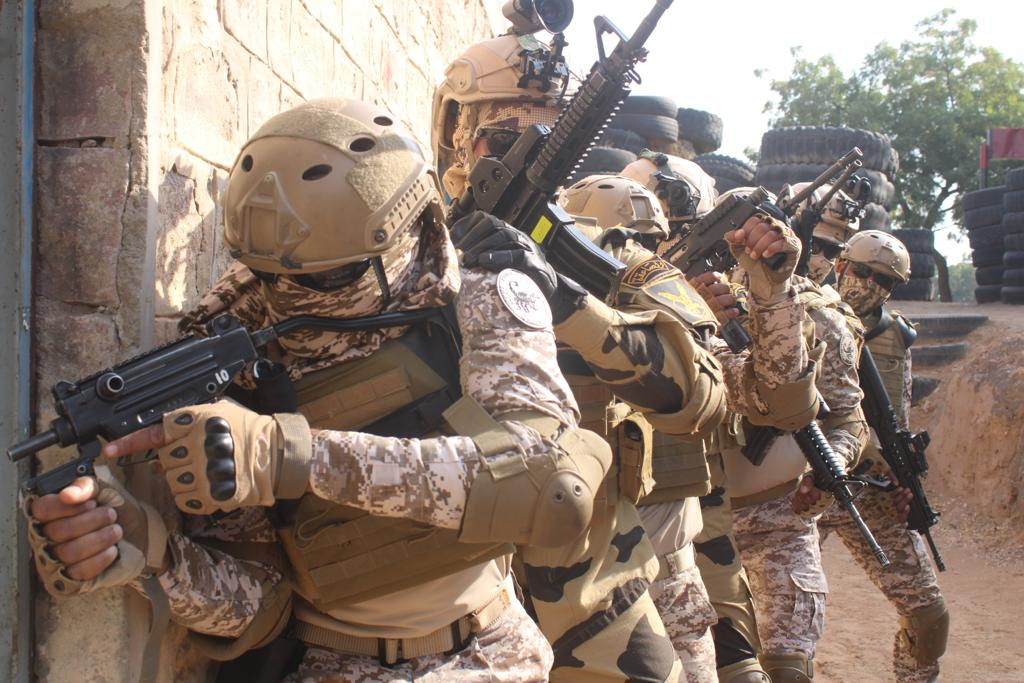
Indian Army and Egyptian Army during Exercise Cyclone

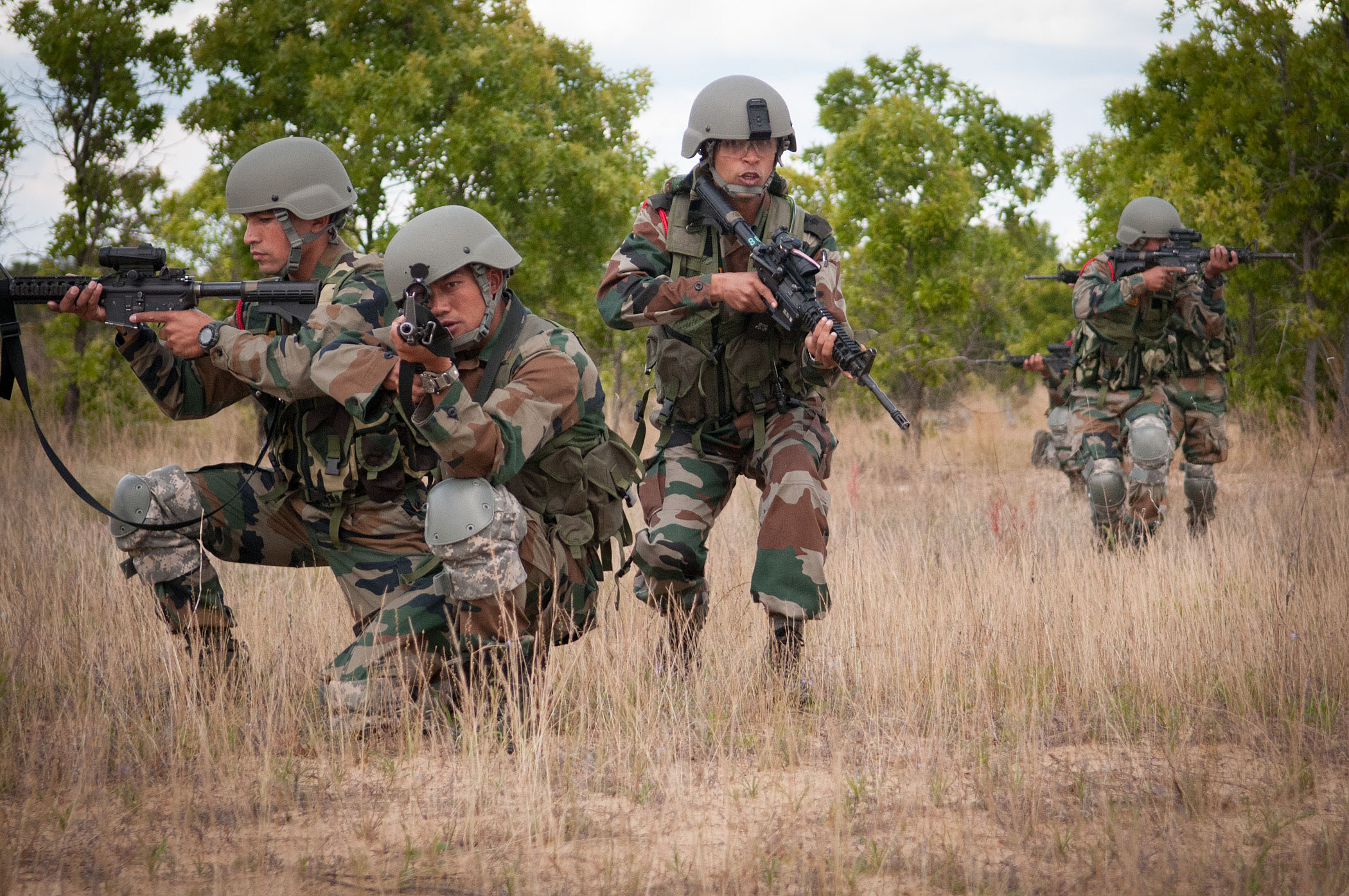
Indian Army soldiers move into position while demonstrating a platoon level ambush to U.S. Army paratroopers.

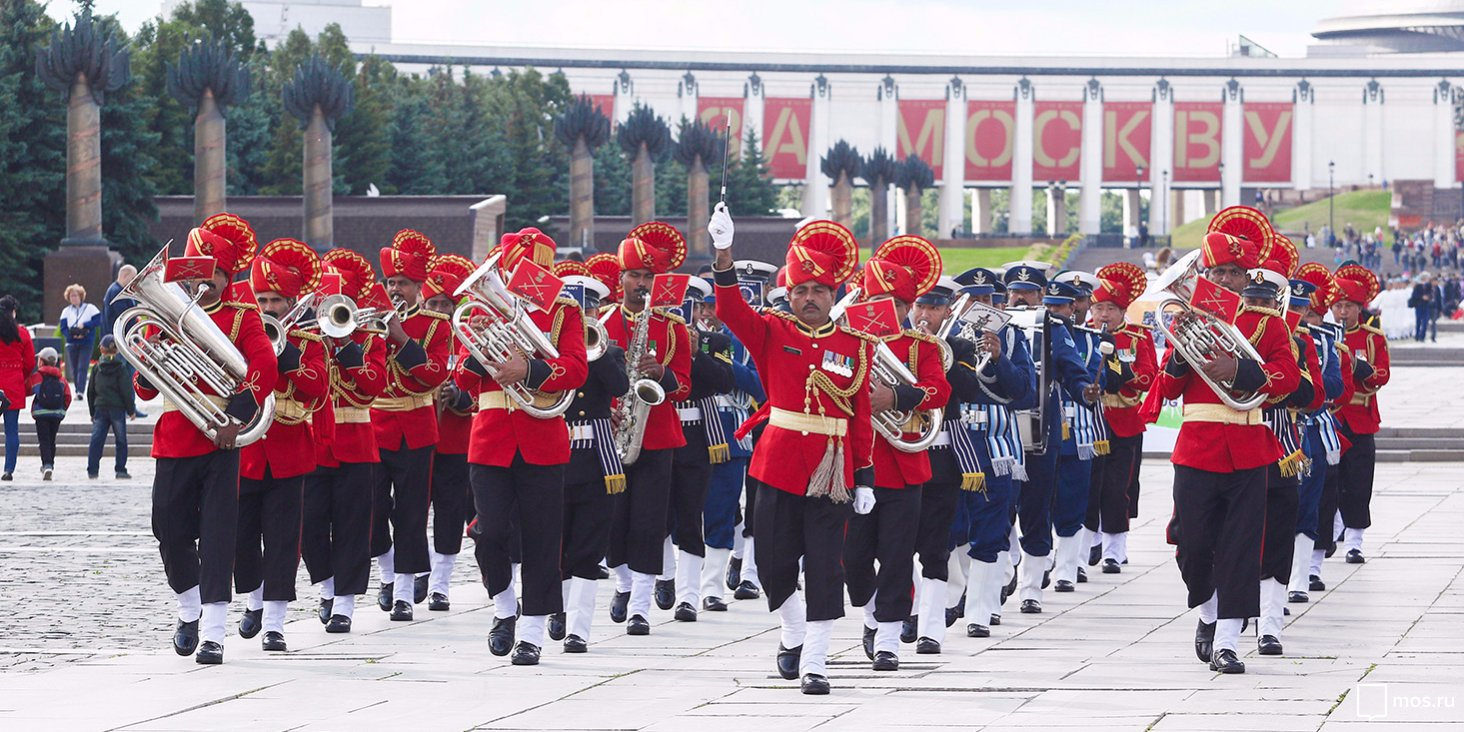
Indian army band in Russia during the Moscow Victory Day Parade

Not to be confused with the field corps listed above, the corps mentioned below are divisions entrusted with specific pan-Army tasks.

The Indian Territorial Army has battalions affiliated with different infantry regiments and some department units that are from the Corps of Engineers, Army Medical Corps, or the Army Service Corps. They serve as a part-time reserve. On 4 June 2017, the chief of staff announced that the Army was planning to open combat positions to women, who would first be appointed to positions in the military police.

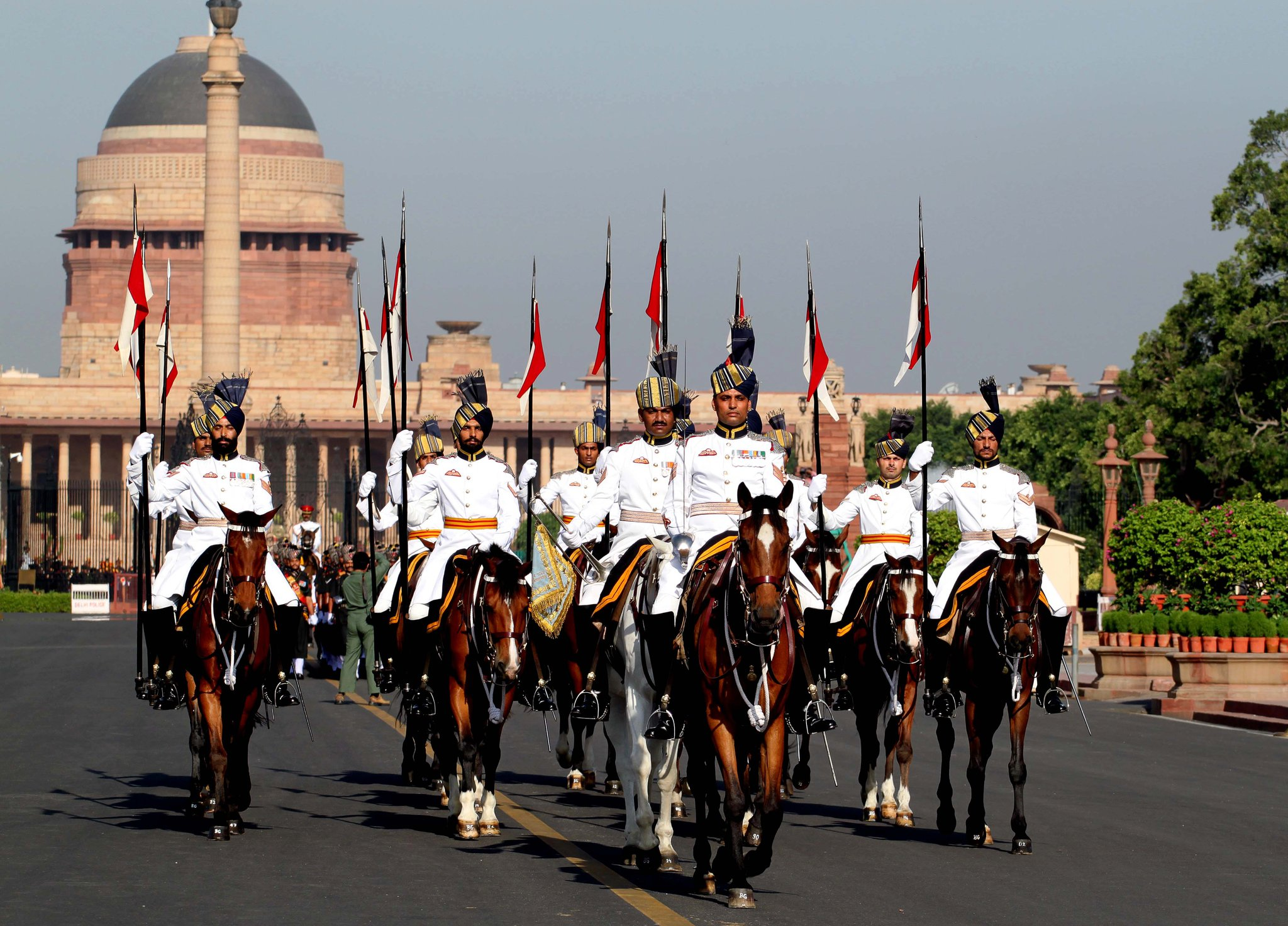
President's Bodyguard in summer ceremonial uniforms in Rashtrapati Bhavan courtyard during changing of the guard

Name	Director General	Centre
Armoured Corps	Lieutenant General Prit Pal Singh, PVSM, AVSM	The Armoured Corps Centre and School, Ahmednagar
Regiment of Artillery	Lieutenant General Anoop Shinghal, AVSM, SM	The School of Artillery, Devlali near Nasik
Corps of Army Air Defence	Lieutenant General I S Panjrath, SM, VSM	Gopalpur, Odisha.
Army Aviation Corps	Lieutenant General Vinod Nambiar, SM	Combat Army Aviation Training School, Nasik.
Electronic and Mechanical Engineers	Lieutenant General Rajiv Kumar Sahni, AVSM, VSM	Military College of Electronic and Mechanical Engineering, Secunderabad
Corps of Engineers	Lieutenant General Vikas Rohella, AVSM, SM**	College of Military Engineering, Pune; Madras Engineer Group, Bangalore; Bengal Engineer Group, Roorkee; Bombay Engineer Group, Khadki near Pune
Corps of Signals	Lieutenant General Vivek Dogra, SM	Military College of Telecommunication Engineering (MCTE), Mhow; Two Signal Training Centres at Jabalpur and Goa.
Infantry	Lieutenant General Anil Kumar Pundir, SM, VSM	Multiple centres

==== Armoured Corps ====
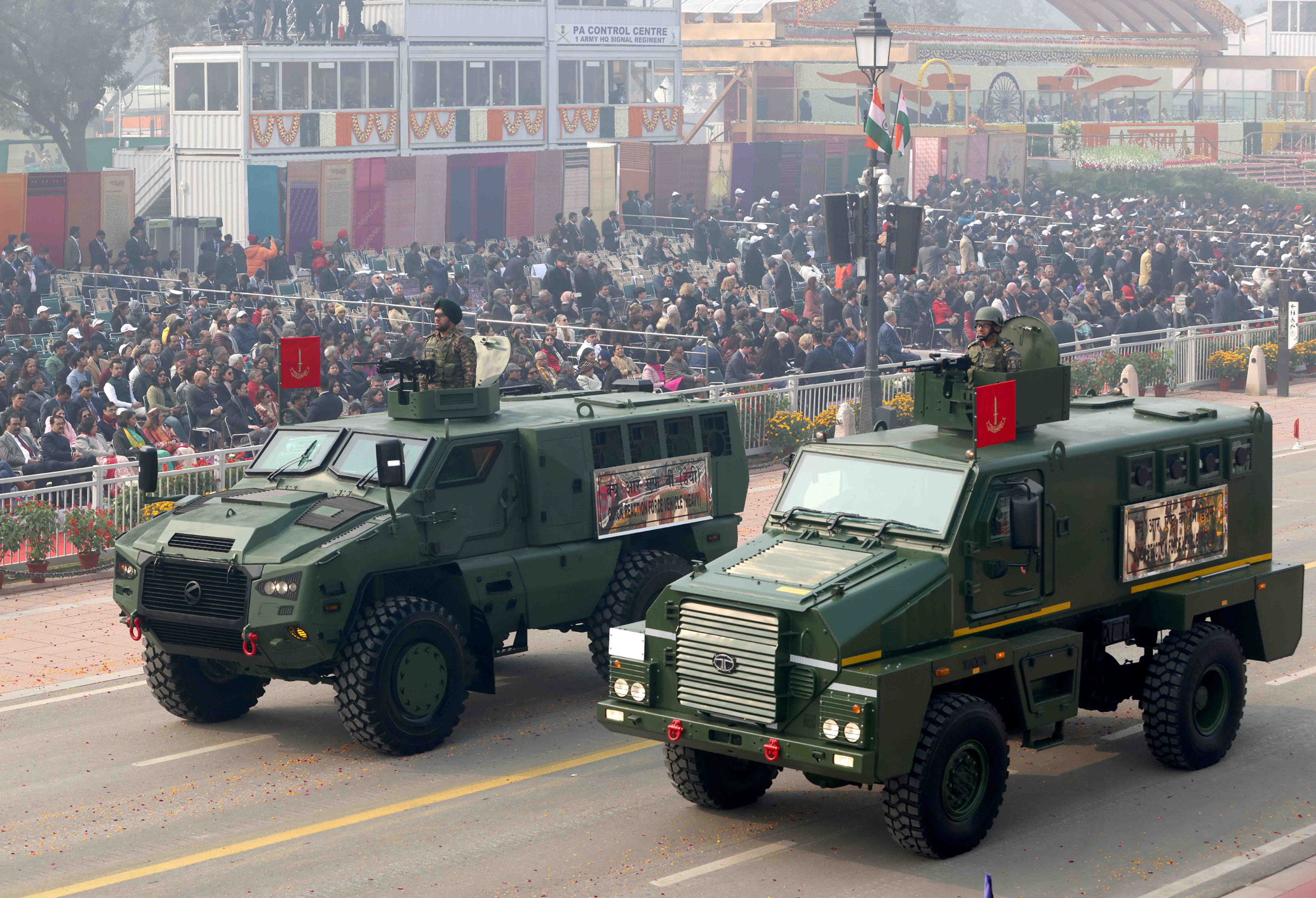
Kalyani and Tata Mine Protected Vehicles

There are 65 armoured regiments in the Indian Army. These include the President's Bodyguard and the 61st Cavalry as well as the following historic regiments dating back to the nineteenth century or earlier: 1st (Skinner's) Horse, the 2nd Lancers (Gardner's Horse), the 3rd Cavalry, the 4th (Hodson's) Horse, the 7th Light Cavalry, the 8th Light Cavalry, the 9th (Deccan) Horse, the 14th (Scinde) Horse, the 17th (Poona) Horse, the 15th Lancers, the 16th Light Cavalry, the 18th Cavalry, the 20th Lancers and the 21st (Central India) Horse. A substantial number of additional units designated as either "Cavalry" or "Armoured" Regiments have been raised since Independence.

==== Mechanised Infantry ====
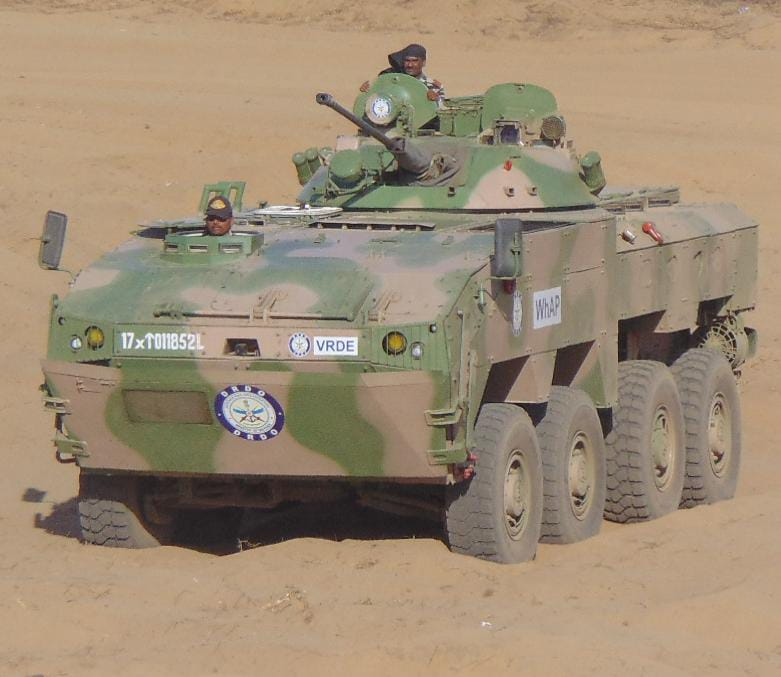
TATA Kestrel of the Indian Army

The Mechanised Infantry is the newest combat arm of the Indian Army. Often referred to as "tomorrow's arm in today's army", it is formed of two regiments—The Brigade of the Guards and Mechanised Infantry Regiment—and comprises 50 Mechanised Infantry battalions in all. It is the brainchild of General Krishnaswamy Sundarji (28 April 1930 – 8 February 1999), who was the Chief of Army Staff of the Indian Army from 1986 to 1988. During the late 70s, as part of Indian Army modernisation, there was an urgent need to re-calibrate the Indian Mechanised Forces, which led to the forming of Mechanised Infantry units to further the shock-action, fire-power, flexibility, and mobility of armoured formations by including ground-holding ability. The Mechanised Infantry regiments were first created with carefully selected existing Infantry battalions, based on their operational performance. As the need for more mechanised battalions grew, the elite Brigade of The Guards was also converted to the mechanised profile. The two regiments along with the Armoured Corps form part of the Indian Army's elite "Mechanised Forces".

There are 50 mechanised infantry battalions in the Army. Of these, 10 are for reconnaissance and support battalions (5 wheeled and 5 tracked) and 40 are standard mechanised infantry battalions (10 wheeled and 30 tracked).

The Standard and Recce & Support Tracked battalions are equipped with BMP-2 while the Wheeled ones are equipped with Jeep (mounted ATGM launchers) and BRDM-2. The recce and support battalions also included 4 ATGM battalions (including 17 Guards battalion). These were later converted to R&S battalions.

==== Infantry ====
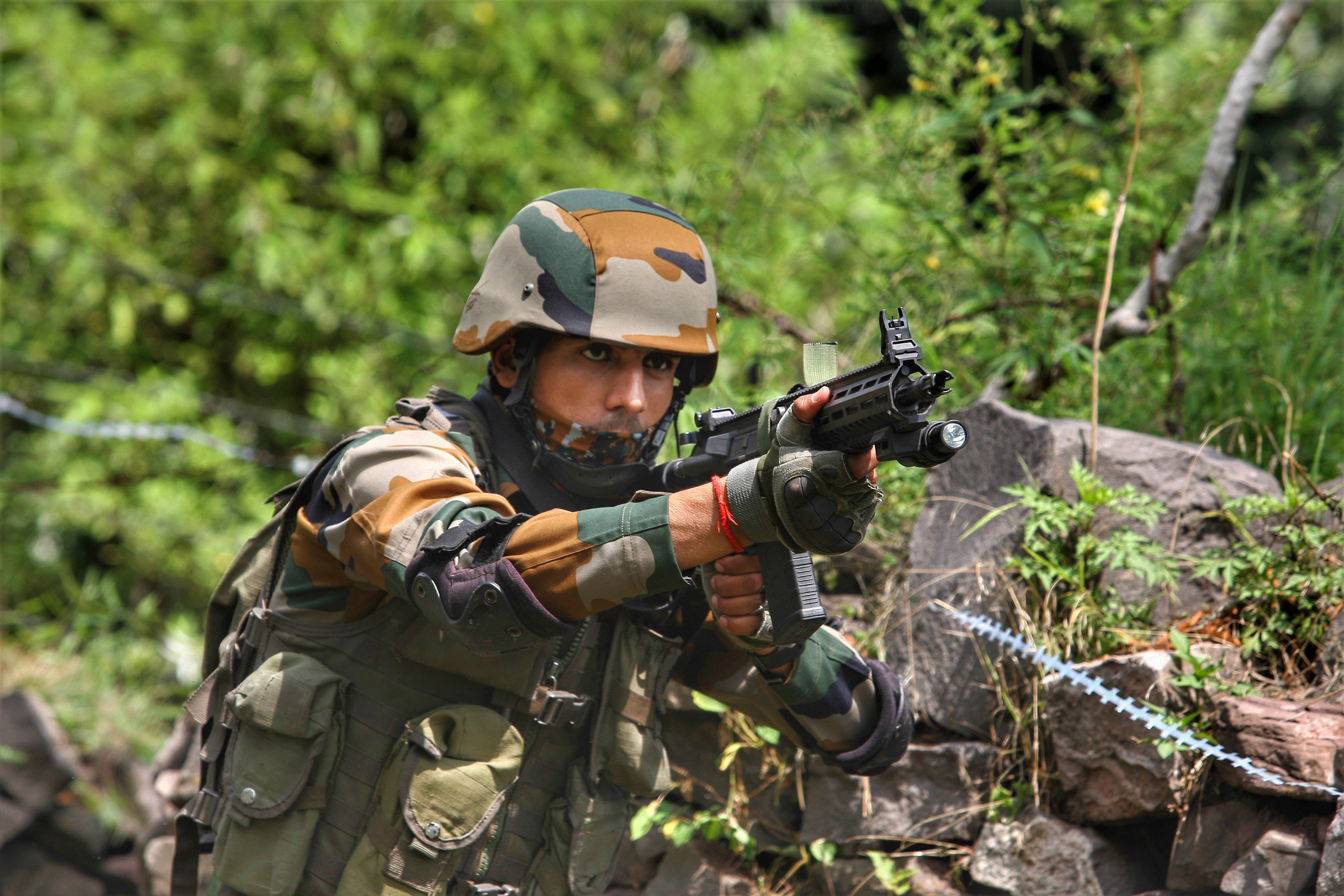
Indian soldier from White Knight Corps armed with a standard issued Sig 716i, 2021

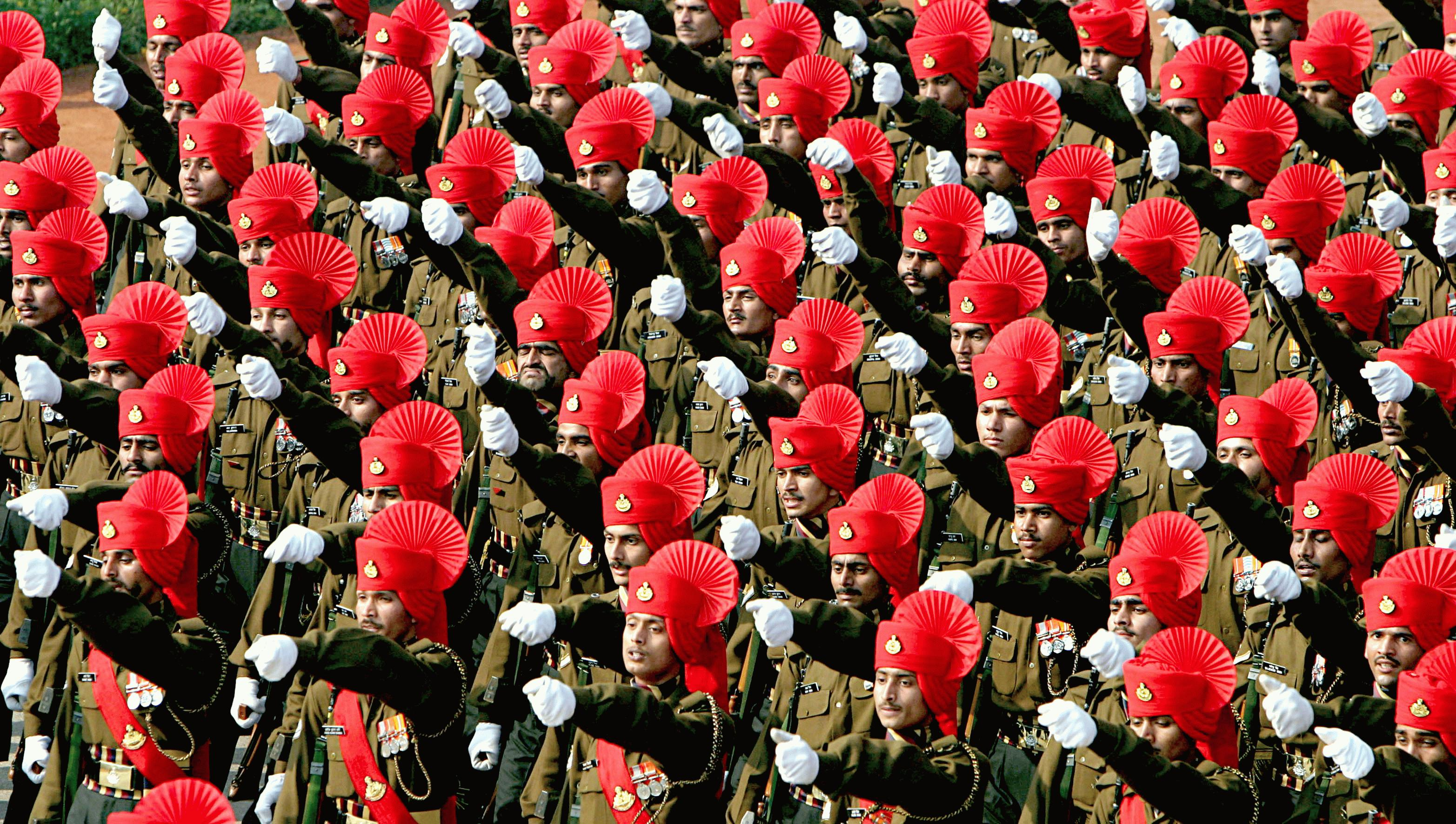
Soldiers of the Rajput Regiment during a Republic Day Parade

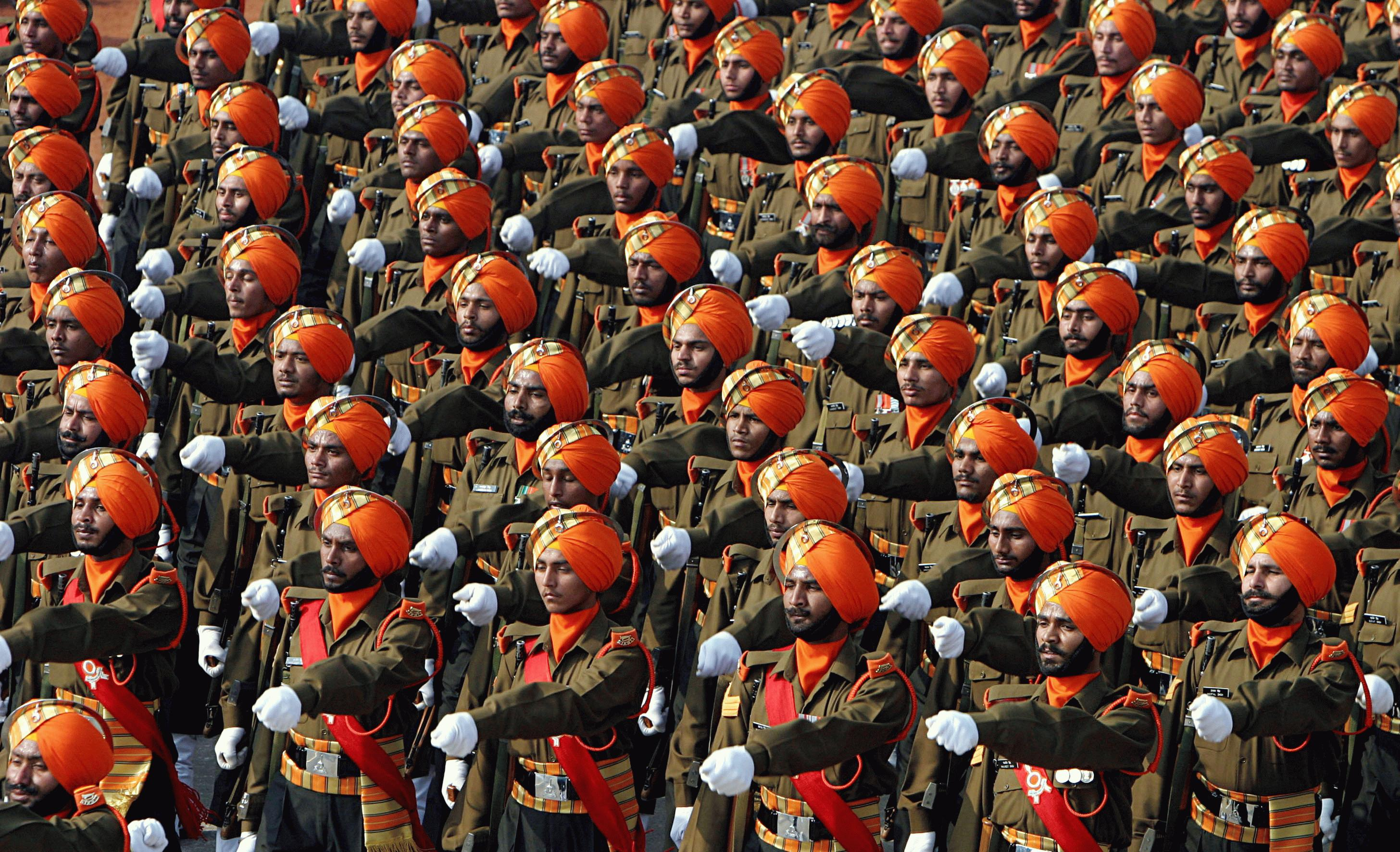
Soldiers of the Sikh Light Infantry during a Republic Day Parade

Upon its inception, the Indian Army inherited the British Army's organisational structure, which is still maintained today. Therefore, like its predecessor, an Indian infantry regiment's responsibility is not to undertake field operations but to provide battalions and well-trained personnel to the field formations. As such, it is common to find battalions of the same regiment spread across several brigades, divisions, corps, commands, and even theatres. Like its British and Commonwealth counterparts, troops enlisted within the regiment are immensely loyal, take great pride in the regiment to which they are assigned, and generally spend their entire career within the regiment.

Most Indian Army infantry regiments recruit based on certain selection criteria, such as region (for example, the Assam Regiment), caste/community (Jat Regiment), or religion (Sikh Regiment). Most regiments continue the heritage of regiments raised under the British Raj, but some have been raised after independence, some of which have specialised in border defence, in particular the Ladakh Scouts, the Arunachal Scouts, and the Sikkim Scouts.

Over the years there have been fears that troops' allegiance lay more with their regiments and the regions/castes/communities/religions from which they were recruited, as opposed to the Indian union as a whole. Thus some "all India" or "all class" regiments have been created, which recruit troops from all over India, regardless of region, caste, community, or religion: such as the Brigade of the Guards (which later converted to the Mechanised Infantry profile) and the Parachute Regiment.

Given the rise in drone warfare, the Indian Army included drone platoons to each of its infantry battalions.

Infantry regiments in the Indian Army
Regiment	Regimental Center	Raised
Parachute Regiment	Bangalore, Karnataka	1945
Punjab Regiment	Ramgarh Cantonment, Jharkhand	1761
Madras Regiment	Wellington Cantonment, Tamil Nadu	1758
The Grenadiers	Jabalpur, Madhya Pradesh	1778
Maratha Light Infantry	Belgaum, Karnataka	1768
Rajputana Rifles	Delhi Cantonment, New Delhi	1775
Rajput Regiment	Fatehgarh, Uttar Pradesh	1778
Jat Regiment	Bareilly, Uttar Pradesh	1795
Sikh Regiment	Ramgarh Cantonment, Jharkhand	1846
Sikh Light Infantry	Fatehgarh, Uttar Pradesh	1857
Dogra Regiment	Faizabad, Uttar Pradesh	1877
Garhwal Rifles	Lansdowne, Uttarakhand	1887
Kumaon Regiment	Ranikhet, Uttarakhand	1813
Assam Regiment	Shillong, Meghalaya	1941
Bihar Regiment	Danapur Cantonment, Bihar	1941
Mahar Regiment	Sagar, Madhya Pradesh	1941
Jammu & Kashmir Rifles	Jabalpur, Madhya Pradesh	1821
Jammu and Kashmir Light Infantry	Avantipur, Jammu and Kashmir	1947
Naga Regiment	Ranikhet, Uttarakhand	1970
1 Gorkha Rifles	Sabathu, Himachal Pradesh	1815
3 Gorkha Rifles	Varanasi, Uttar Pradesh	1815
4 Gorkha Rifles	Sabathu, Himachal Pradesh	1857
5 Gorkha Rifles (Frontier Force)	Shillong, Meghalaya	1858
8 Gorkha Rifles	Shillong, Meghalaya	1824
9 Gorkha Rifles	Varanasi, Uttar Pradesh	1817
11 Gorkha Rifles	Lucknow, Uttar Pradesh	1918
Ladakh Scouts	Leh, Jammu and Kashmir	1963
Rashtriya Rifles	Udhampur, Jammu and Kashmir	1990
Arunachal Scouts	Shillong, Meghalaya	2010
Sikkim Scouts	Lucknow, Uttar Pradesh	2013

==== Artillery ====
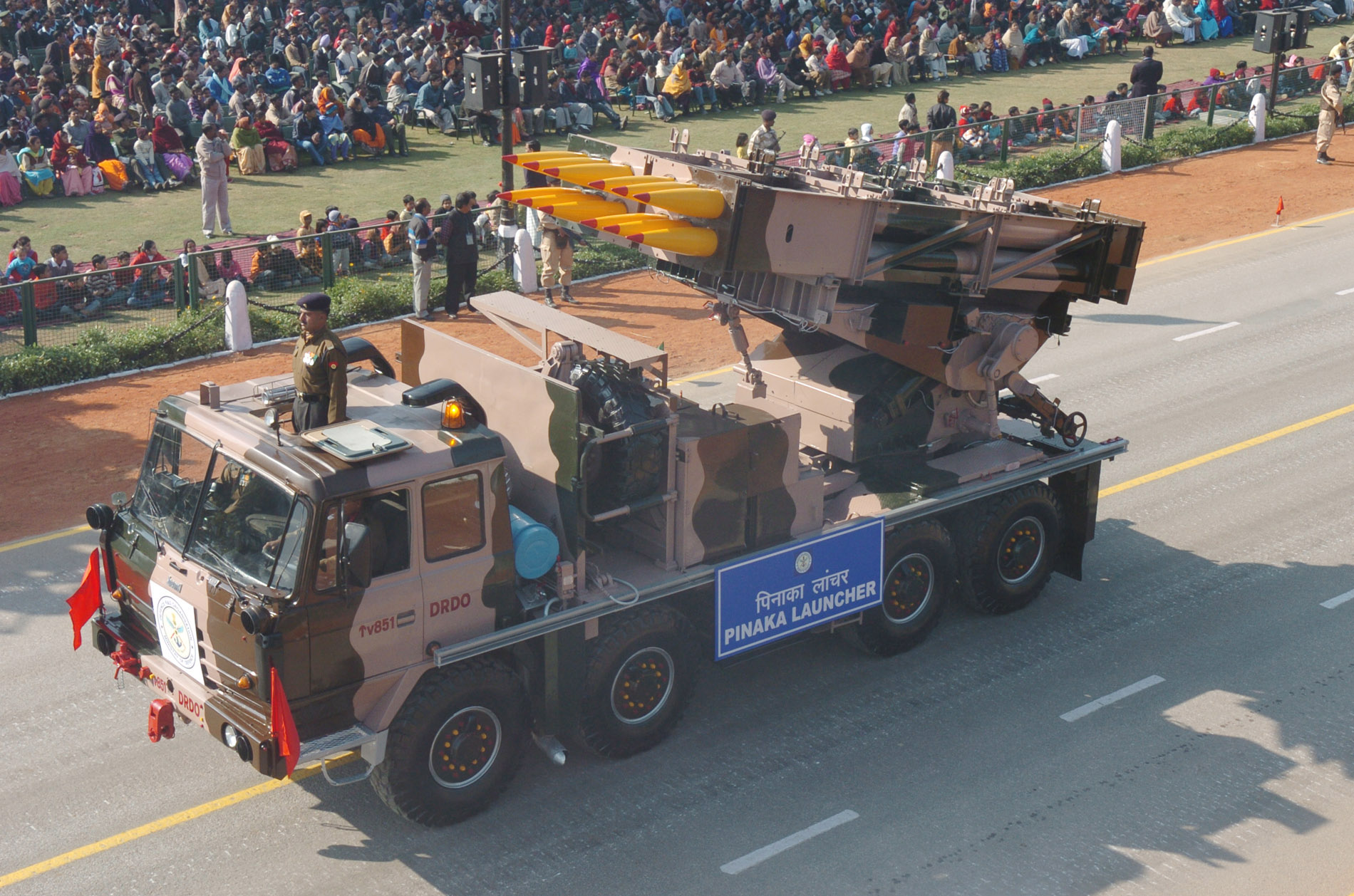
Pinaka Multi Barrel Rocket Launchers were used during the Kargil War.

The Regiment of Artillery is the second-largest arm of the Indian Army, constituting nearly one-sixth of the Army's total strength. Originally raised in 1935 as part of the Royal Indian Artillery of the British Indian Army, the regiment is now tasked with providing the Army's towed and self-propelled field artillery, including guns, howitzers, heavy mortars, rockets, and missiles.

As an integral part of nearly all combat operations conducted by the Indian Army, the Regiment of Artillery has a history of being a major contributor to its military success. During the Kargil War, it was the Indian Artillery that inflicted the most damage. Over the years, five artillery officers have gone on to the Army's highest post as Chief of Army Staff.

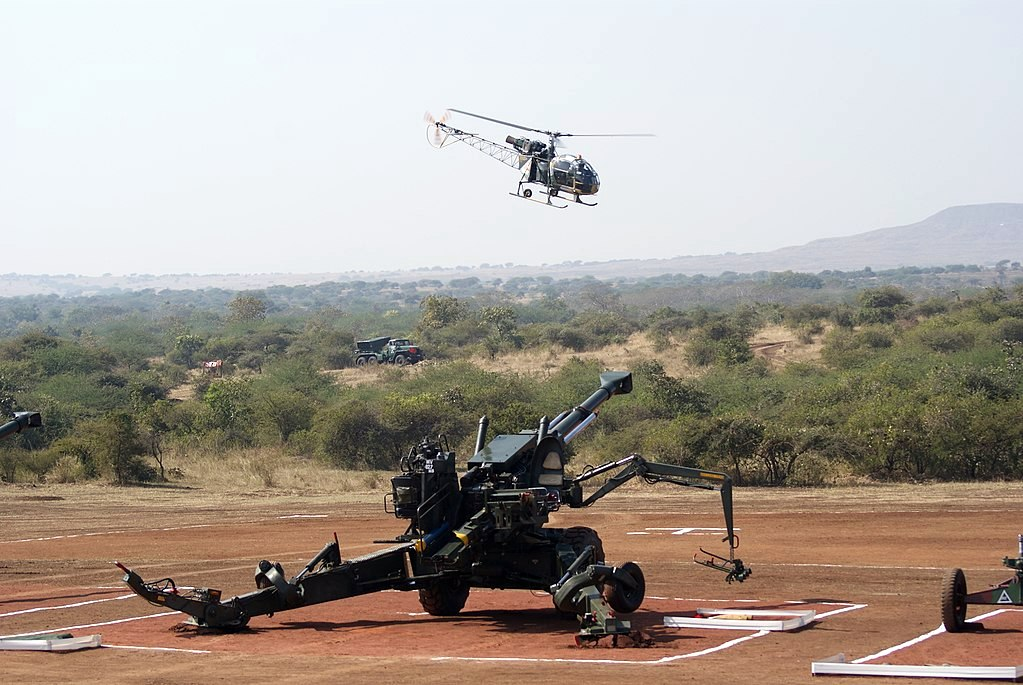
Dhanush artillery gun

For some time, the Regiment of Artillery commanded a significantly larger share of the Army's personnel than it does now, as it was also responsible for air defence artillery and some aviation assets. The 1990s saw the formation of the Corps of Army Air Defence and the coalescing of all aviation assets into the Army Aviation Corps. The arm is now focused on field artillery and supplies regiments and batteries to each of the operational commands. The home of the regiment is in Nashik, Maharashtra, where their headquarters is located, along with the service's museum. The School of Artillery of the Indian Army is located nearby, in Devlali.

After suffering consistent failure to import or produce modern artillery for three decades, the Regiment of Artillery is finally going ahead with procurement of brand new 130-mm and 155-mm guns. The Army is also putting large numbers of rocket launchers into service, with 22 regiments to be equipped with the indigenously developed Pinaka multi barrel rocket launcher by the end of the next decade.

==== Corps of Engineers ====
The Indian Army Corps of Engineers has a long history dating back to the mid-18th century. The earliest existing subunit of the corps (18 Field Company) dates back to 1777, while the corps officially recognises its birth as 1780, when the senior-most group of the corps, the Madras Sappers, were raised. The corps consists of three groups of combat engineers, namely the Madras Sappers, the Bengal Sappers, and the Bombay Sappers. A group is roughly analogous to a regiment of the Indian infantry, each group consisting of several engineer regiments. The engineer regiment is the basic combat-engineer unit, analogous to an infantry battalion.

==== Corps of Signals ====
Indian Army Corps of Signals is a corps and the arm of the Indian Army which handles its military communications. It was formed on 15 February 1911 as a separate entity under Lieutenant Colonel S. H. Powell and went on to make important contributions during World War I and World War II. On 15 February 2011, the corps celebrated the 100th anniversary of its raising.

==== Army Aviation Corps ====
The Army Aviation Corps, formed on 1 November 1986, is the aviation arm of the Indian Army. It is headed by a director-general with the rank of lieutenant general at Army HQ in New Delhi.

==== Corps of Army Air Defence ====
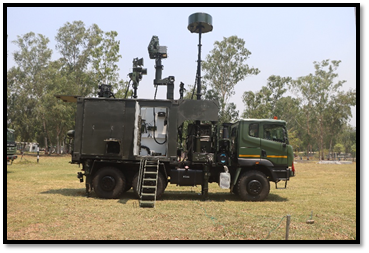
During Operation Sindoor, Akashteer played a central role in neutralizing drone and air attacks by Pakistan

The Corps of Army Air Defence (abbreviated AAD) is an active corps of the Indian Army, and a major combat formation tasked with the air defences of the country from foreign threats. The corps is responsible for the protection of Indian air space from enemy aircraft and missiles, especially those below 5,000 feet.

The history of the AAD dates back to 1939, during the times of the British Raj in India. The corps actively took part in the Second World War, fighting on behalf of the British Empire. Post-independence, the corps has participated in all the wars involving India, starting with the 1947 Indo-Pakistani War, up to the 1999 Kargil conflict. The corps enjoyed autonomous status from 1994, after the bifurcation of the Corps of Air Defence Artillery from the Army's artillery regiment. A separate training school, the Army Air Defence College (AADC), was established to train its personnel.

=== Services ===
Name	Director General	Centre
Army Service Corps	Lieutenant General Mukesh Chadha, AVSM, SM, VSM	Bengaluru
Army Medical Corps	Lieutenant General C G Muralidharan, AVSM	Lucknow/Pune
Army Dental Corps	Lieutenant General Vineet Sharma, AVSM, VSM	Lucknow
Army Ordnance Corps	Lieutenant General Deepak Ahuja	Jabalpur and Secunderabad (HQ)
Corps of Electronics and Mechanical Engineers	Lieutenant General Rajiv Kumar Sahni, AVSM, VSM	Secunderabad
Remount and Veterinary Corps		Meerut
Army Education Corps	-	Pachmarhi
Corps of Military Police		Bengaluru
Pioneer Corps		Bengaluru
Army Postal Service Corps	-	Kamptee near Nagpur
Territorial Army		New Delhi
Defence Security Corps	-	Kannur Cantonment, Kerala
Intelligence Corps	-	Pune
Judge Advocate General's Department	-	Institute of Military Law Kamptee, Nagpur
Military Nursing Service	-	Pune and Lucknow
Human Rights Cell	-	Delhi

==== Recruitment and training ====
Pre-commission training of Gentlemen Cadets is carried out at the Indian Military Academy at Dehradun and the Officers Training Academy at Chennai. There are also specialised training institutions such as the Army War College, at Mhow, Madhya Pradesh; the High Altitude Warfare School (HAWS), at Gulmarg, Jammu and Kashmir; the Counter Insurgency and Jungle Warfare School (CIJW), in Vairengte, Mizoram; and the College of Military Engineering (CME), in Pune.

The Army Training Command (ARTRAC), at Shimla, supervises training of personnel.

In 2020 a 'Tour of Duty' scheme was proposed for voluntary recruitment into the forces for civilians, to enable them to join for three years of short service. The scheme is on a trial basis and will start with a test group of 100 officers and 1000 jawans.

===== Agnipath Scheme =====
Agnipath Scheme is a new scheme introduced by the Government of India on 14 June 2022, for recruitment of soldiers below the rank of commissioned officers into the three services of the armed forces. All recruits will be hired only for a four-year period. Personnel recruited under this system are to be called Agniveers (transl. Fire-Warriors), which will be a new military rank. The introduction of the scheme has been criticized for lack of consultation and public debate. The scheme was implemented in September 2022.

Recruitment in the Indian Army from 2015
Year	Soldiers
2015–16	71,804
2016–17	52,447
2017–18	50,026
2018–19	53,431
2019–20	80,572
2020–21	0
2021–22	0
2022–23	0
2023-24	13,000

This scheme will bypass many things including long tenures, pension and other benefits which were there in old system. Opposition parties in India have criticised and expressed concerns about the consequences of the new scheme. They have asked the scheme to be put on hold and that the scheme be discussed in the Parliament.

==== Intelligence ====
The Directorate of Military Intelligence (DMI) is an intelligence-gathering arm of the Indian Army. The MI (as it is commonly referred to) was constituted in 1941. It was initially created to check corruption in the Army's ranks. With time, its role has evolved into cross-border intelligence, intelligence sharing with friendly nations, infiltrating insurgent groups, and counterterrorism.

In the late 1970s, the MI was embroiled in the Samba spy scandal, wherein three Indian Army officers were falsely implicated as Pakistani spies. The organisation has since emerged from the scandal as a prime intelligence organisation of the Indian Army.

As of 2012, the MI has seen many of its roles taken away by the newly created National Technical Research Organisation and the Defence Intelligence Agency. Since it was set up in 2004 as a premier scientific agency under the National Security Adviser in the Prime Minister's Office, it also includes the National Institute of Cryptology Research and Development (NICRD), which is the first of its kind in Asia.

==== STEAG ====
The Signals Technology Evaluation and Adaptation Group (STEAG), a specialist technical unit tasked with investigating and evaluating cutting-edge communication technologies, was founded by the Indian Army on 18 March 2024. It will prioritize the development of specialized technologies for both wired and wireless systems, such as 5G and 6G networks, quantum technologies, artificial intelligence, machine learning, software-defined radios (SDR), electronic exchanges, mobile communications, and Electronic Warfare (EW) systems. In order to find appropriate defense applications, the unit will work with industry and academics to utilize state-of-the-art technology. In addition to developing and evaluating key Information and Communications Technology (ICT) solutions, STEAG will do technical scouting and provide user interface assistance by maintaining and upgrading modern technologies.

=== Field formations ===
Below are the basic field formations of the Indian Army:

- Command: Indian Army has six operational commands and one training command. Each one is headed by a general officer commanding-in-chief (GOC-in-C), known as the army commander, who is among the senior-most lieutenant general officers in the army.
- Corps: A command generally consists of two or more corps. Indian Army has 14 Corps each one commanded by a general officer commanding (GOC), known as the corps commander, who holds the rank of lieutenant general. Each corps is composed of three or four divisions. There are three types of corps in the Indian Army: Strike, Holding and Mixed. The Corps HQ is the highest field formation in the army.
- Division: Each division is headed by GOC (division commander) in the rank of major general. It usually consists of three to four Brigades. Currently, the Indian Army has 40 Divisions including four RAPIDs (Re-organised Army Plains Infantry Division), 18 Infantry Divisions, 12 Mountain Divisions, three Armoured Divisions and three Artillery Divisions.
- Brigade: A brigade generally consists of around 3,000 combat troops with supporting elements. An Infantry Brigade usually has three Infantry battalions along with various Support Elements. It is commanded by a brigade commander who is a brigadier, equivalent to a brigadier general in some armies. In addition to the Brigades in various Army Divisions, the Indian Army also has five Independent Armoured Brigades, 15 Independent Artillery Brigades, seven Independent Infantry Brigades, one Independent Parachute Brigade, three Independent Air Defence Brigades, two Independent Air Defence Groups and four Independent Engineer Brigades. These Independent Brigades operate directly under the corps commander (GOC Corps).
- Battalion: Composed of four rifle companies. Commanded by a battalion commander who is a colonel and is the Infantry's main fighting unit. Every infantry battalion also possesses one Ghatak Platoon.
- Company: Composed of three platoons. Commanded by a company commander who is a major or lieutenant-colonel.
- Battery: Comprising either 3 or 4 sections, in artillery and air defence units. Every battery has two officers, the senior of which is the battery commander.
- Platoon: Composed of three sections. Commanded by a platoon commander who is a JCO.
- Section: Smallest military outfit, with a strength of 10 personnel. Commanded by a section commander of the rank of Havaldar.

=== Indian Army forts ===
- Fort William, Kolkata: Garrison of Eastern Army Command
- Fort St George, Chennai: Garrison of ATNK&K Army Area
- OD Fort, Allahabad, Ordnance Depot

== Personnel ==
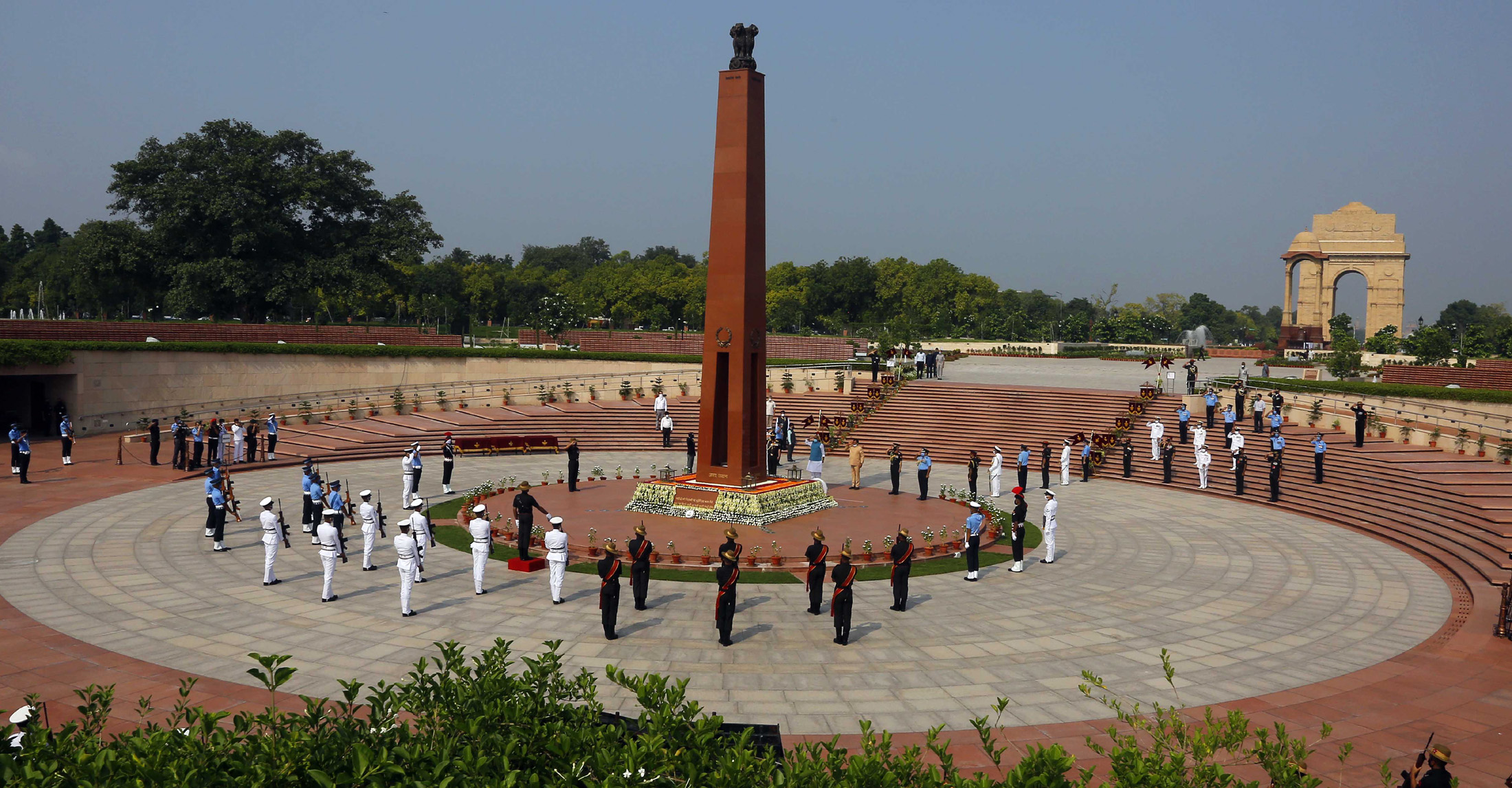
National War Memorial in honour of soldiers who laid down their lives for the nation.

The Indian Army is a voluntary service, and although a provision for military conscription exists in the Indian constitution, conscription has never been imposed. As of 1 July 2017, the Indian Army has a sanctioned strength of 49,932 officers (42,253 serving, being 7,679 under strength), and 1,215,049 enlisted personnel (1,194,864 serving, being 20,185 under strength). Recently, it has been proposed to increase the strength of the army by more than 90,000, to counter the increasing presence of Chinese troops along the Line of Actual Control. According to the International Institute for Strategic Studies, in 2020 the army had a strength of 1,237,000 active personnel and 960,000 reserve personnel. Of those in reserve, 300,000 are first-line reserves (within 5 years of active service), 500,000 are committed to return if called until the age of 50, and 160,000 were in the Indian Territorial Army, with 40,000 in regular establishment. This makes the Indian Army the world's largest standing volunteer army.

=== Rank structure ===
The ranks of the Indian Army for the most part follow the British Army tradition.

Strength of the Indian Army
1. Officers 42,913 (3.49%)
2. Personnel below officer rank 1,185,146 (96.5%)

Strength of the Indian Army
Pay level	Rank	Borne Strength (status as on 1 July 2021)
Officers
18	General	2
17/16/15	Lieutenant General	90
14	Major General	300
13A	Brigadier	1162
13	Colonel	5586
12A	Lieutenant Colonel	12620
11	Major	11885
10B	Captain	6637
10	Lieutenant	3218
—N/a	Re-employed & Officers in select rank officers outside cadre	1574
Total		43056
Officers in AMC & ADC		6647
Officers in MNS		3866
GRAND TOTAL		53569

As of January 2019, the Indian Army had an authorized strength of 50,312 officers and 1,223,381 personnel below officer rank (PBOR), bringing the total to 1,273,693. However, there was a shortfall of 7,399 officers and 38,235 PBORs, reducing the actual strength to 42,913 officers and 1,185,146 PBORs. This resulted in a total actual strength of 1,228,059 personnel.

Commissioned Officers Commissioned officers are the leaders of the army and command units from platoon/company to brigade, division, corps, and above.

Indian Army officers are continually put through different courses of training, and assessed on merit, for promotions and appointments. Substantive promotions up to lieutenant colonel, or equivalent, are based on time in service, whereas those for the colonel and above are based on selection, with promotion to colonel being also based on time served.

Equivalent ranks of Indian military
Commission	Indian Navy	Indian Army	Indian Air Force
Commissioned	Admiral of the fleet	Field marshal	Marshal of the Indian Air Force
Commissioned	Admiral	General	Air chief marshal
Commissioned	Vice admiral	Lieutenant general	Air marshal
Commissioned	Rear admiral	Major general	Air vice marshal
Commissioned	Commodore	Brigadier	Air commodore
Commissioned	Captain	Colonel	Group captain
Commissioned	Commander	Lieutenant colonel	Wing commander
Commissioned	Lieutenant commander	Major	Squadron leader
Commissioned	Lieutenant	Captain	Flight lieutenant
Commissioned	Sub lieutenant	Lieutenant	Flying officer
Junior commissioned	Master chief petty officer 1st class	Subedar major (Note: Risaldar major in cavalry and armoured regiments)	Master warrant officer
Junior commissioned	Master chief petty officer 2nd class	Subedar (Note: Risaldar in cavalry and armoured regiments)	Warrant officer
Junior commissioned	Chief petty officer	Naib subedar (Note: Naib risaldar in cavalry and armoured regiments. Called jemadar until 1965.)	Junior warrant officer
Non-commissioned	Petty officer	Havildar/Daffadar	Sergeant
Non-commissioned	Leading seaman	Naik/Lance daffadar	Corporal
Non-commissioned	Seaman 1	Lance naik/Acting Lance-Daffadar	Leading aircraftsman
Non-commissioned	Seaman 2	Sepoy/Sowar	Aircraftsman

Rank group	General / flag officers					Senior officers			Junior officers
Indian Army
Indian Army	Field marshal फील्ड मार्शल	General जनरल	Lieutenant general लेफ्टिनेंट जनरल	Major general मेजर जनरल	Brigadier ब्रिगेडियर	Colonel कर्नल	Lieutenant colonel लेफ्टिनेंट कर्नल	Major मेजर	Captain कैप्टन	Lieutenant लेफ्टिनेंट
	Honorary/ War time rank	Held by the Chief of Defence Staff (with different insignia) or the Chief of the Army Staff

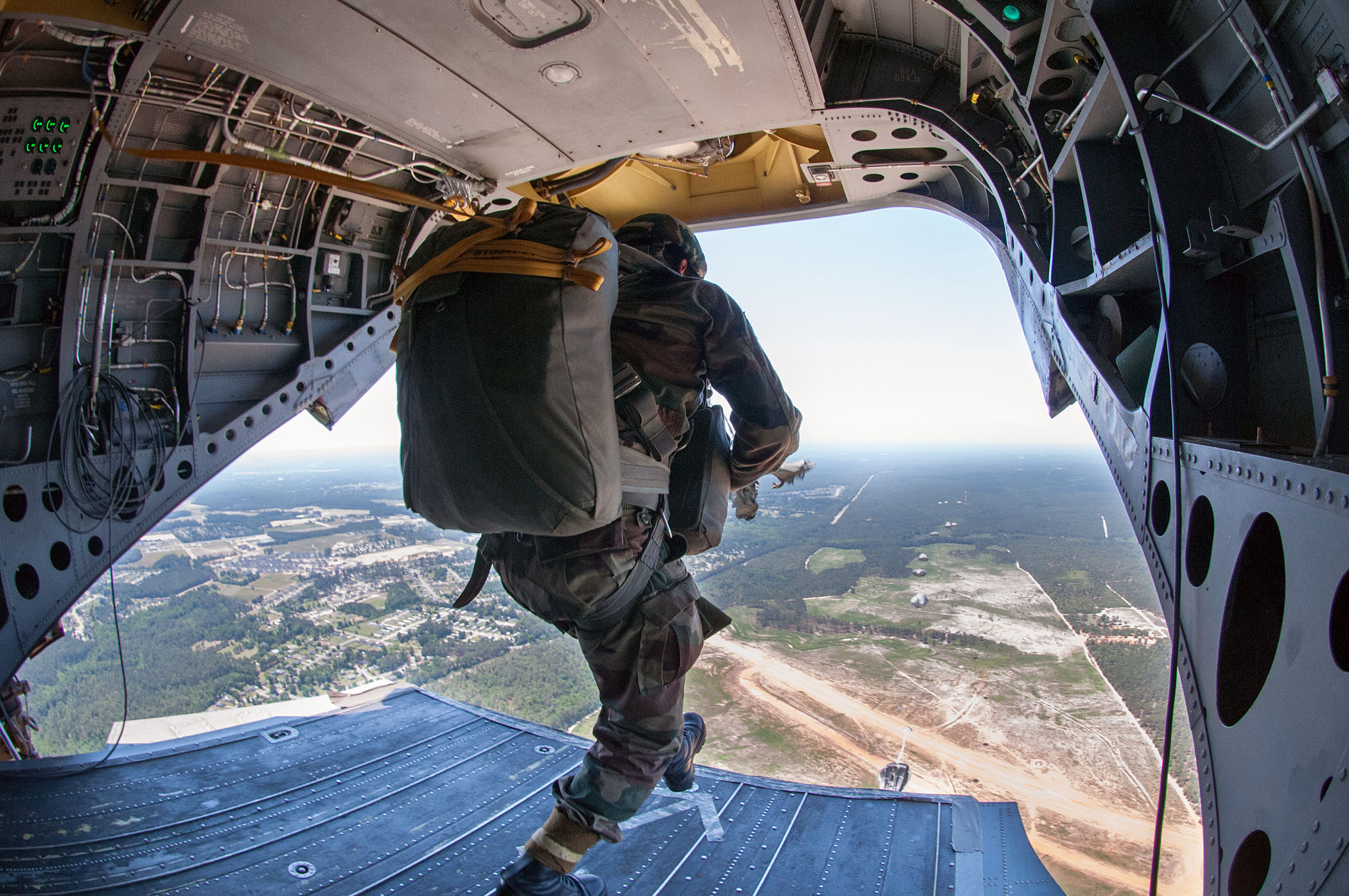
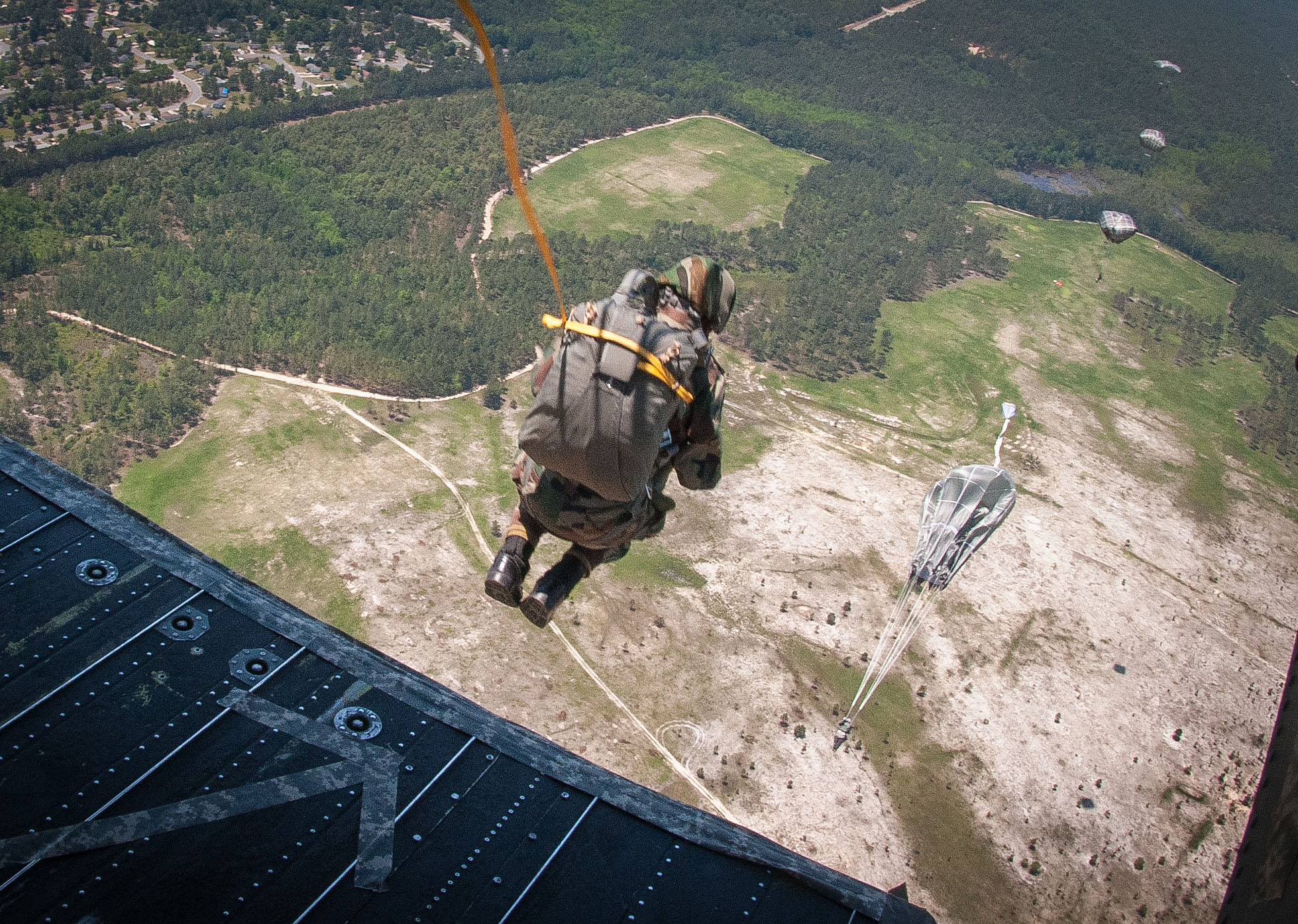
An Indian Army paratrooper with the 50th Parachute Brigade jumps from a helicopter

Other Ranks

Rank group	Junior commissioned officers			Non commissioned officer			Enlisted
Indian Army							No insignia
Indian Army	Subedar-major सूबेदार मेजर	Subedar सूबेदार	Naib subedar नायब सूबेदार	Havildar हवलदार	Naik नायक	Lance naik लांस नायक	Sepoy सिपाही

=== Uniforms ===
To make themselves less of a target, the forces of the East India Company in India dyed their white summer tunics to neutral tones initially a tan called khaki (from the Hindi word for "dusty"). This was a temporary measure that became standard in the Indian service in the 1880s. Only during the Second Boer War in 1902, did the entire British Army standardise on dun for Service Dress. The Indian Army uniform standardised on dun for khaki.

The Indian Army's current service dress consists of a dark green coloured short-sleeved shirt with matching dark green trousers. Officers can add a four pocket tunic worn over a peach coloured button down shirt and black tie. The Winter "Angola", meaning Angora wool, version substitutes a light brown/dark khaki long-sleeved button up shirt. It is accompanied by beret or peaked cap depending on the regiment the soldier belongs to. Organizational headwear, sashes, belts, spats, medals, lanyards, and other achievements are added for ceremonial duties. A black version of the service dress is worn by the Armoured Corps.

The 2006 standard issued camouflage uniform of the Indian Army was the PC-DPM which consists of French Camouflage Europe Centrale featuring a forest camouflage pattern and is designed for use in woodland environments being printed on BDU. The Desert variant issued in 2006 was based on the French Camouflage Daguet printed on BDU, which features a desert camouflage pattern, is used by artillery and infantry posted in dusty, semi-desert, and desert areas of Rajasthan and its vicinity. Starting in 2022, a digital pixelated camouflage pattern uniform designed by NIFT has been adopted, while the uniform style is similar to the US Marine MMCUU uniform.

The new camouflage pattern retains the mix of colours including olive green and earthen, and has been designed keeping in mind aspects like areas of deployment of the troops and climatic conditions they operate in. According to the officials, the fabric of the new material makes it lighter, sturdier, more breathable, and more suitable for the different terrains that the soldiers are posted in.

The new uniform, unlike the old one, has a combat T-shirt worn underneath and a jacket over it. Also, unlike the older uniform, the shirt will not be tucked in. The jacket has angular top pockets, lower pockets with vertical openings, knife pleats at the back, a pocket on the left sleeve & a pen holder on the left forearm, and improved-quality buttons. The trousers will be adjustable at the waist with elastic and buttons, and has a double layer at the groin. For the caps, the girth will be adjustable, and the logo of the Army will be of better quality than earlier.

The new uniforms would not be available in the open market. The uniforms will be barcoded and QR coded to maintain their uniqueness and will be available only through the ordnance chain or military canteens. To control random proliferation, they will come in over a dozen pre-stitched standard sizes. The new uniform will be made available in a phased manner to the nearly 1.2 million personnel of the Indian Army.

The modern Indian Army wears distinctive parade uniforms characterised by variegated turbans and waist-sashes in regimental colours. The Gurkha and Garhwal Rifles and the Assam, Kumaon, and Naga Regiments wear broad-brimmed hats of traditional style. Traditionally, all rifle regiments (the Jammu and Kashmir Rifles, the Garhwal Rifles, all Gorkha Rifles, and the Rajputana Rifles), as well as the Jammu and Kashmir Light Infantry, wear rank badges, buttons, and wire-embroidered articles in black, instead of the usual brass (or gold) colour, as the original role of the rifle regiments was camouflage and concealment.

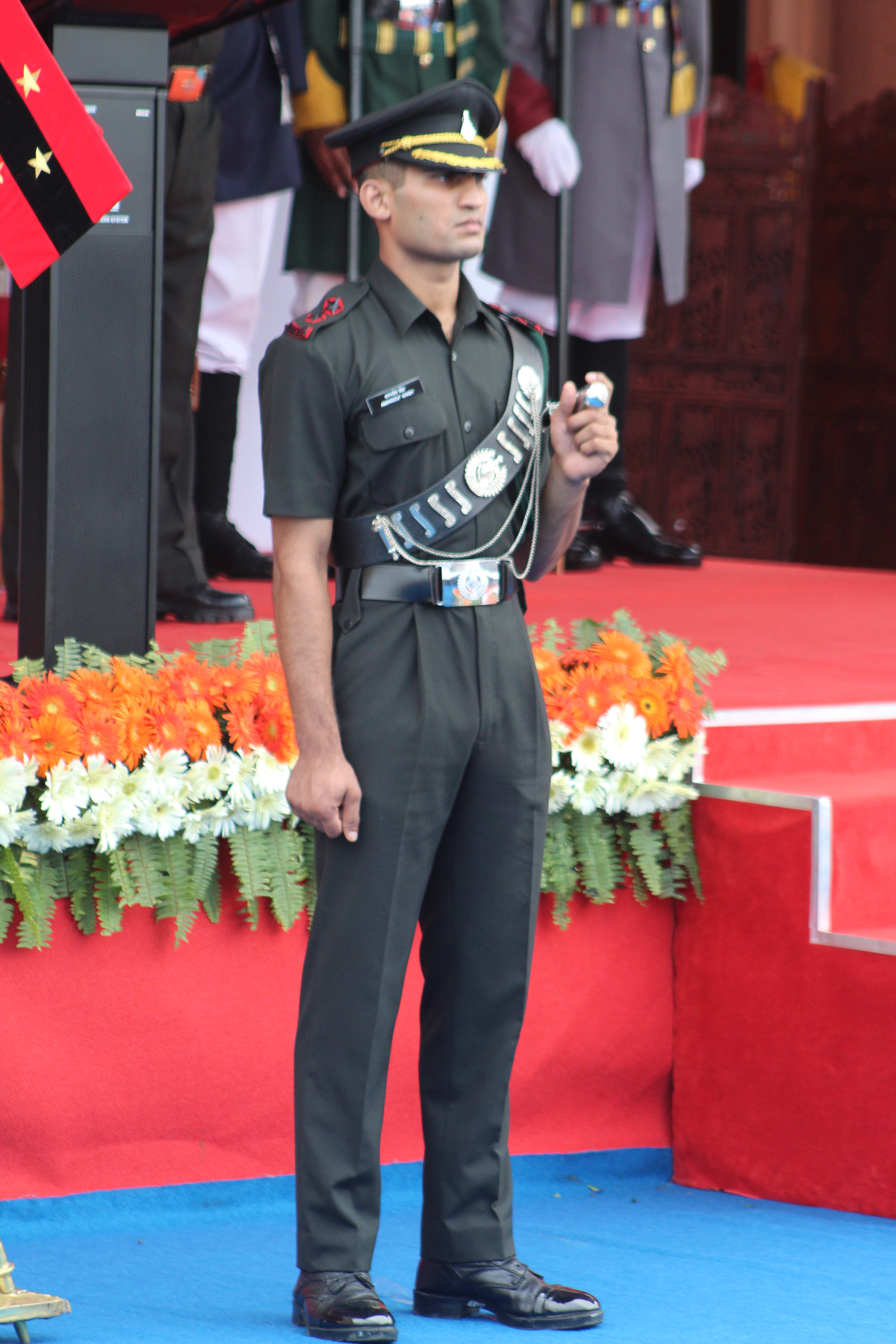
Indian Army officer in green service uniform

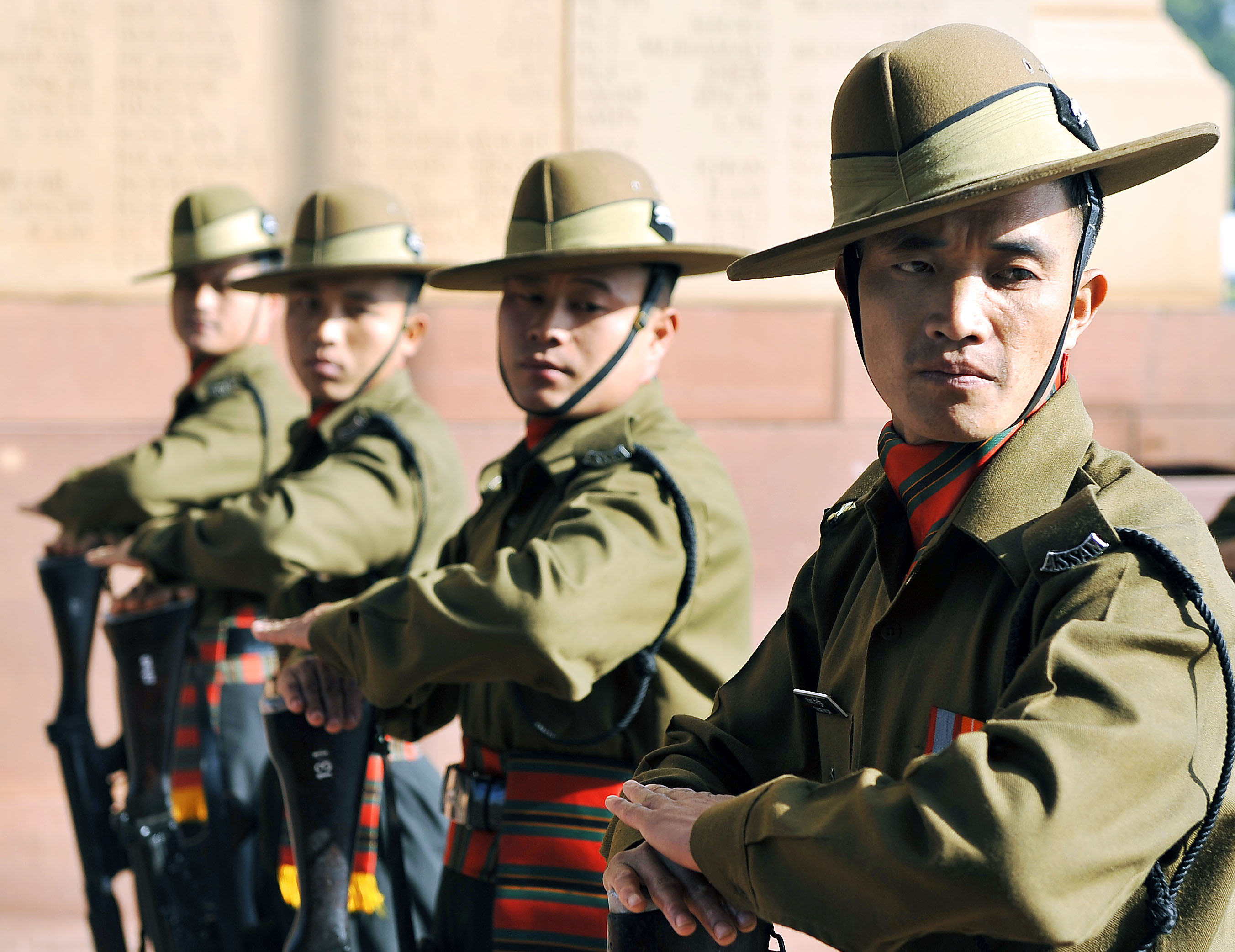
Soldiers of the Assam Regiment wearing the Angola winter shirt.

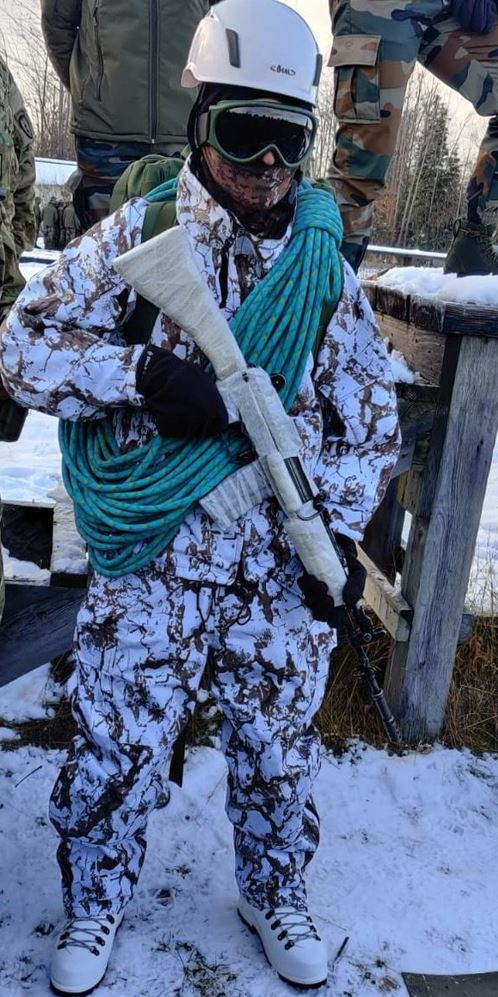
Winter camouflage adopted in 2022

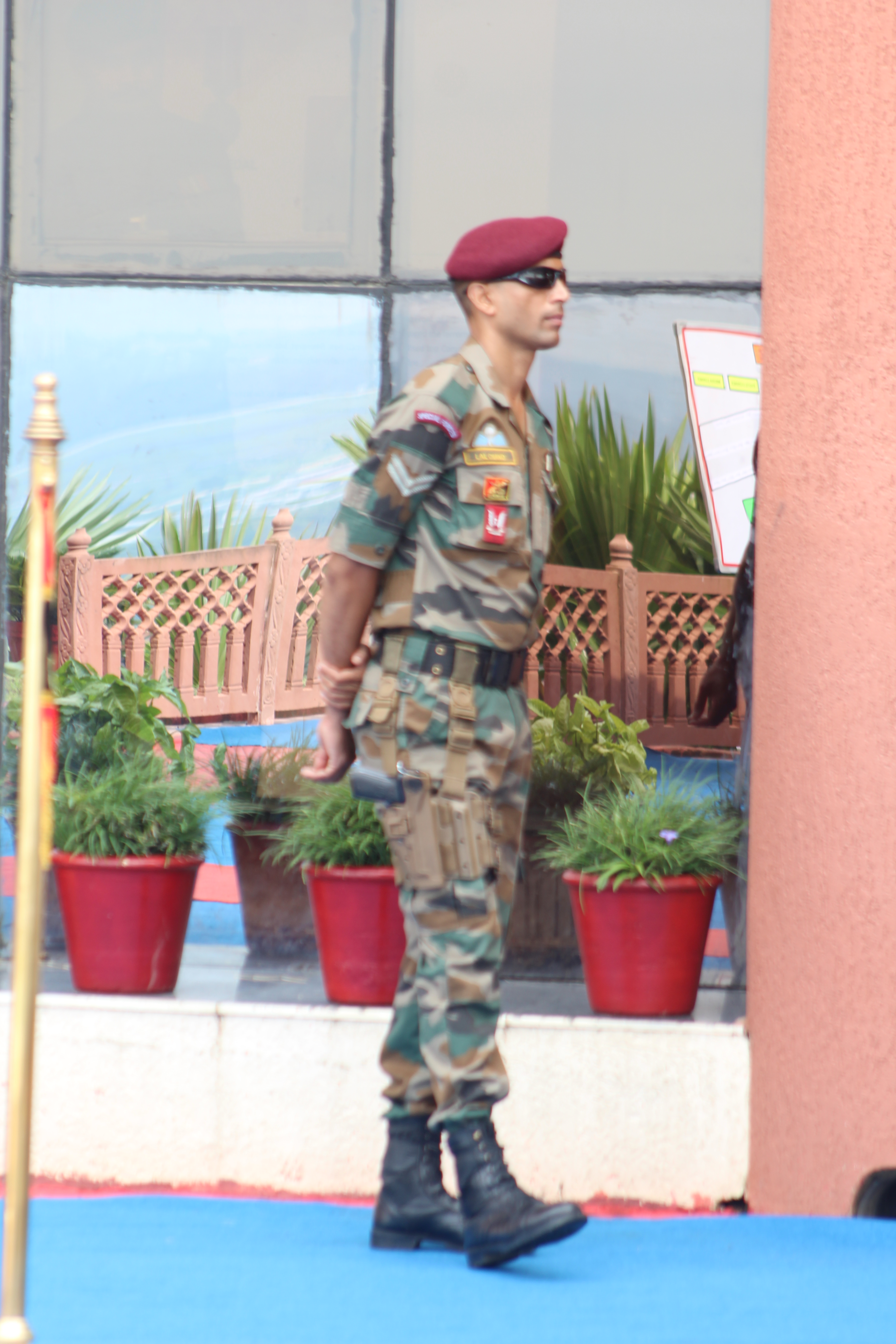
Indian Army Para-Commando wearing the PC-DPM based on a combination of French French Camouflage Europe Centrale printed on US-style BDU

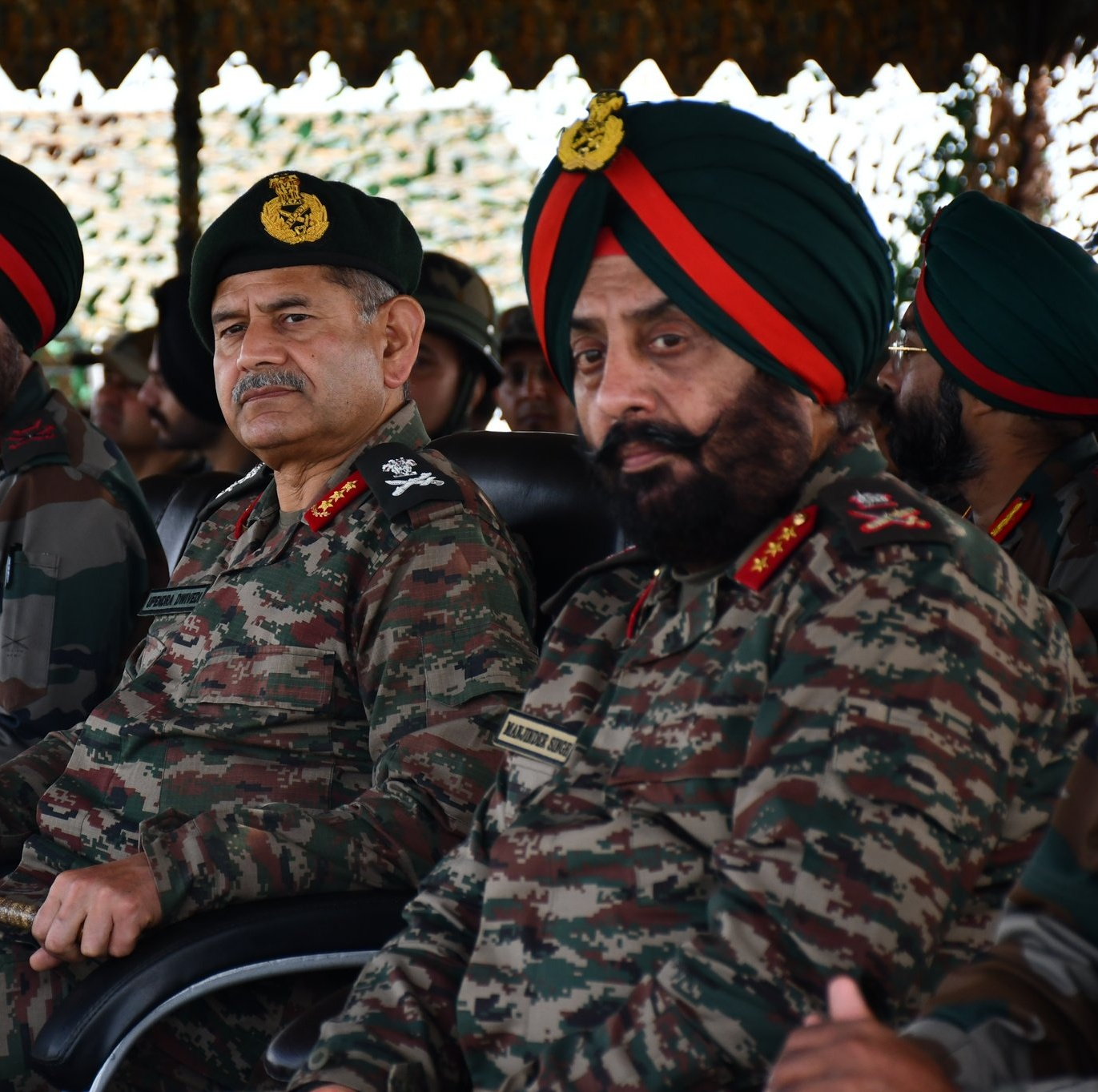
Senior officer from Northern Command wearing the new NIFT Camouflage

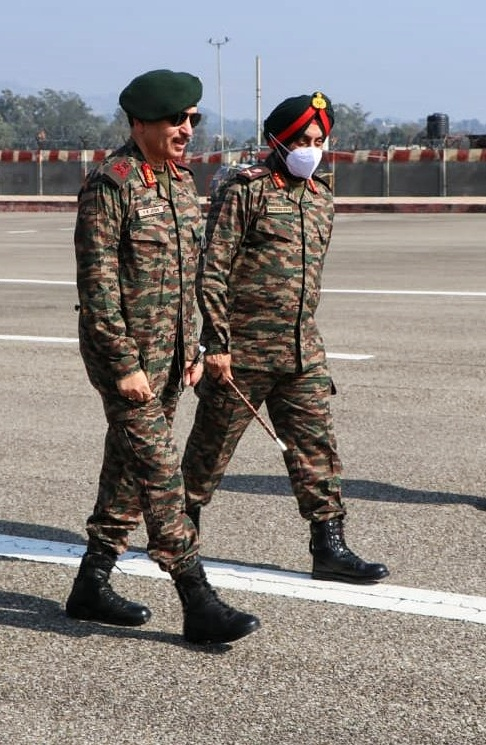
Indian Army personnel wearing the new uniform designed by NIFT

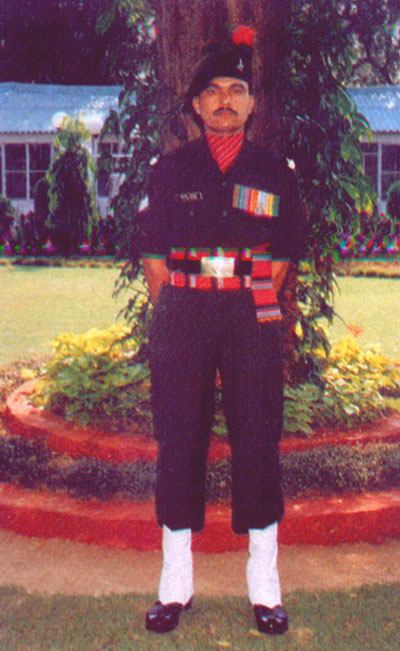
14th Maratha jawan in ceremonial version of the service dress

=== Medals and awards ===
The medals awarded by the President of India for gallantry displayed on the battlefield, in order of precedence, are Param Vir Chakra, Maha Vir Chakra, and Vir Chakra.

The medals awarded by the president for gallantry displayed away from the battlefield, in order of precedence, are Ashoka Chakra, Kirti Chakra, and Shaurya Chakra.

Many of the recipients of these awards have been Indian Army personnel.

=== Women ===
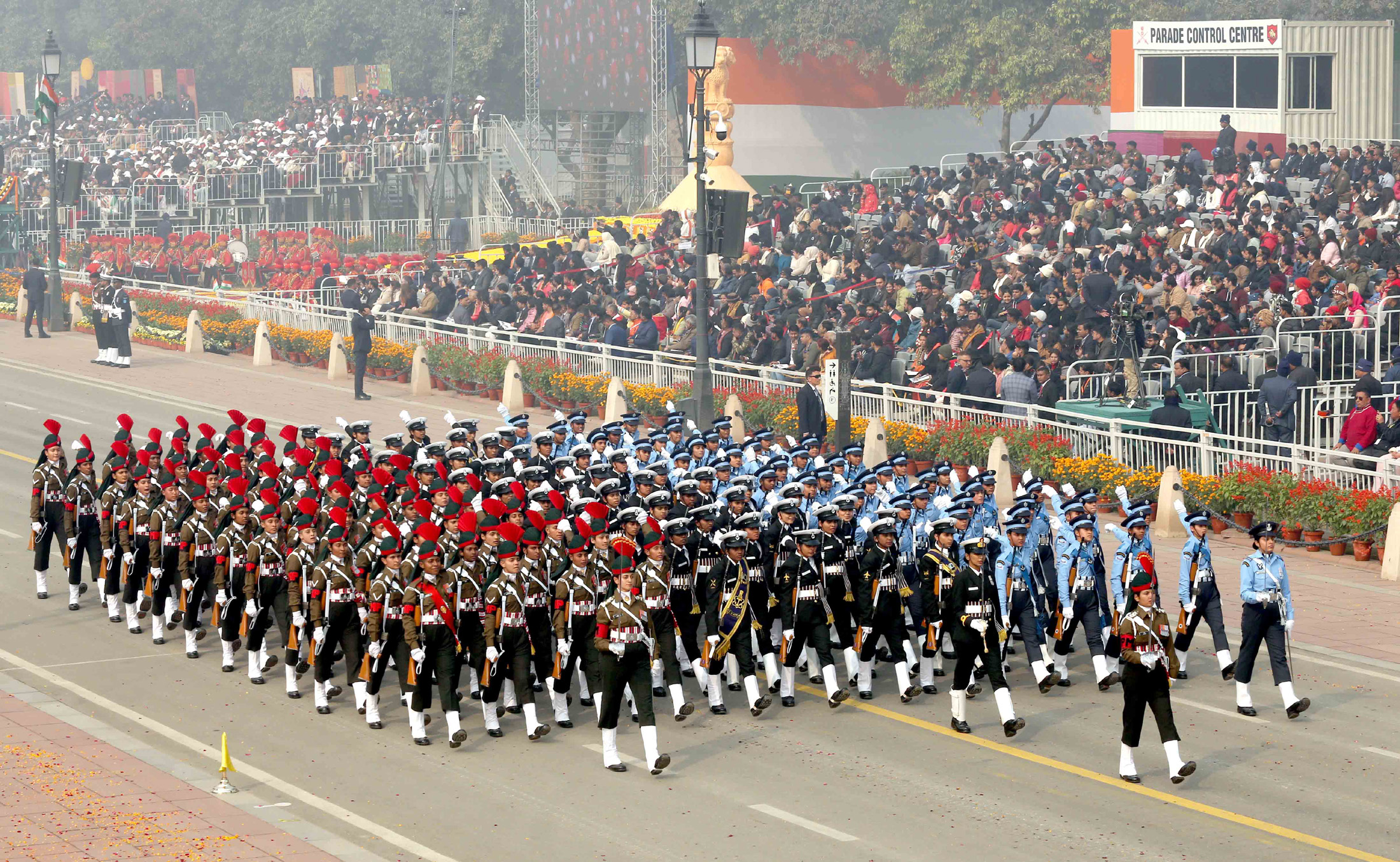
All Women contingents from the three services during Republic day parade 2024

The role of women in the Indian Army began when the Indian Military Nursing Service was formed in 1888. Nurses served in World Wars I and II, where 350 Indian Army nurses either died, were taken prisoner of war, or declared missing in action; this includes nurses who died when SS Kuala was sunk by Japanese Bombers in 1942. In 1992, the Indian Army began inducting women officers in non-medical roles.

=== Agnipath Recruiting Scheme ===
The Agnipath Scheme (also spelled Agneepath Scheme) (Hindi: Agnīpath Yojanā, transl. Agnipath Scheme) is a tour of duty style scheme approved by the Government of India on 14 June 2022 and implemented in the country a few months later in September 2022, for recruitment of soldiers below the rank of commissioned officers into the three services of the armed forces. All recruits will be hired only for a four-year period however 25% will be eligible for advancement into career status. Personnel recruited under this system are to be called Agniveers (transl. Fire-Warriors), which will be a new military rank. The introduction of the scheme has been criticised for lack of consultation and public debate. Initial training will last six months and the remaining three years and six months will be service time.

== Recruitment and Training ==
=== Officers (Permanent commission) ===
==== National Defence Academy and Naval Academy Examination ====
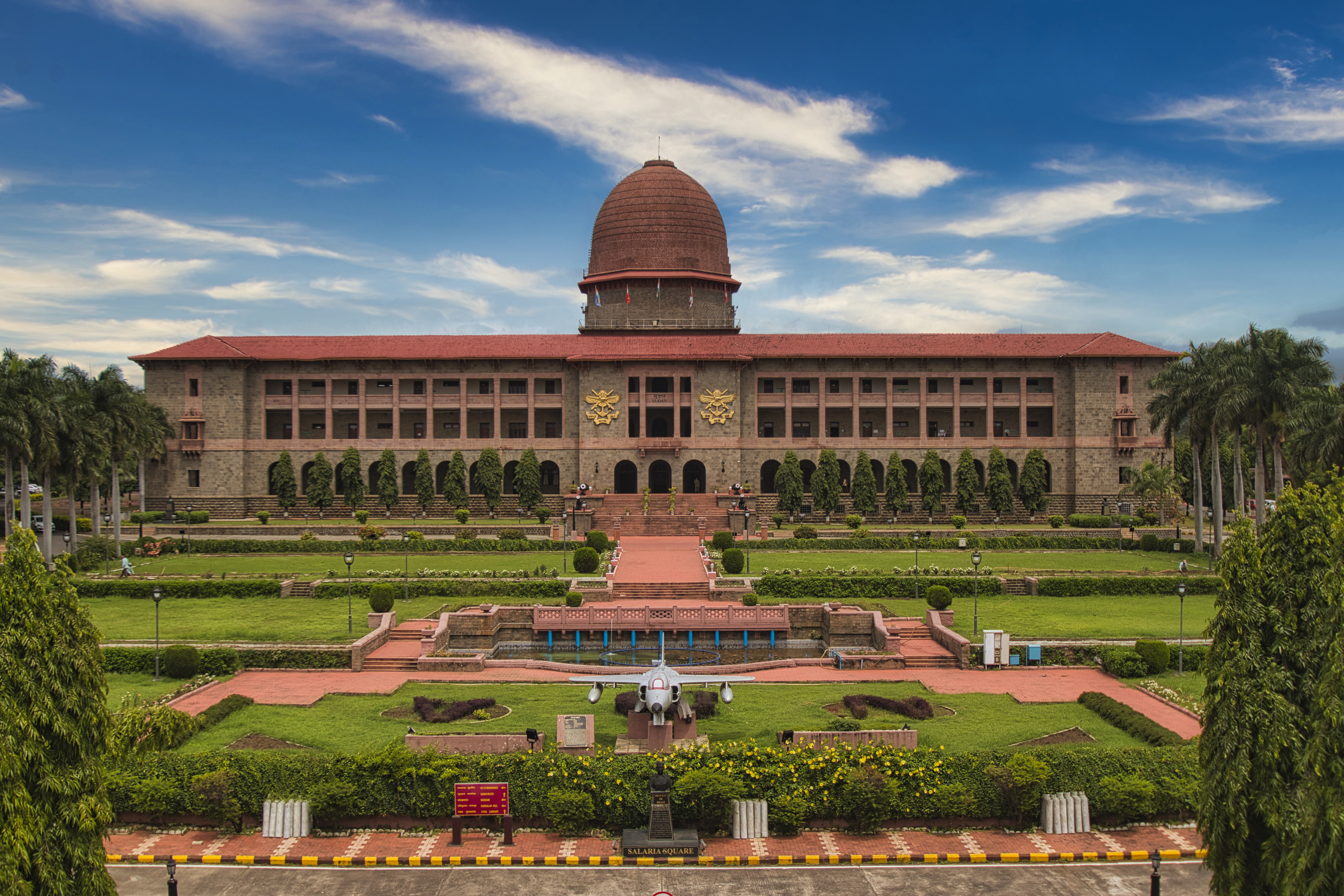
NDA is the premier officer training academy for the army

The NDA/NA is the premier entry route to join the army as Permanent Commission officers. It is open to unmarried candidates aged 16½–19½ years, NDA/NA selects students after 10+2, irrespective of stream for army. The NDA/NA exam is held twice a year, consisting of Mathematics and General Ability. Candidates who clear the cutoff undergo a five-day Services Selection Board (SSB) interview, followed by a medical examination. The final merit determines the selection. The examination is highly competitive as approximately 600,000 candidates apply for roughly 800 vacancies each year.

Training is conducted in two phases. First, cadets spend three years at National Defence Academy, earning a Jawaharlal Nehru University affiliated degree in B.Sc. or B.A. while undergoing basic military training. After graduation, Army cadets move to the Indian Military Academy (IMA), Dehradun for one year of advanced army training focused on leadership and field warfare.

On completion, cadets are commissioned as Lieutenants. Based on merit and preference, they are allotted to infantry (such as Rajputana Rifles, Dogra Regiment, etc.), armoured corps (such as Poona Horse, 87th Armoured Regiment, etc.), Regiment of Artillery, Corps of Engineers, Corps of Signals, etc.

==== Combined Defence Services Examination (IMA) ====
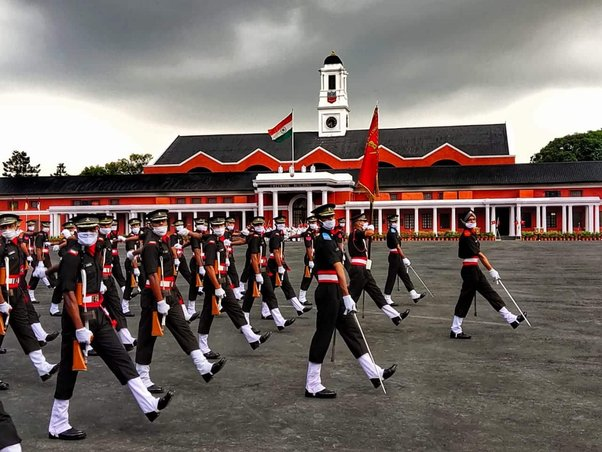
The IMA is the sole PC general duty training academy for officers

The Combined Defence Services Examination (CDSE) is conducted for graduates to join the army as Permanent Commission officers. It is conducted by UPSC twice a year (April and September), CDSE allows entry into the Indian Military Academy (IMA) for the Army.

Candidates applying must be unmarried Indian male citizens, aged 19–24 years for IMA entry. A bachelor's degree in any stream is required for the Army, along with medical fitness standards similar to NDA, with strict requirements for vision, height, and general health. The selected candidates for the army join the Indian Military Academy (IMA), Dehradun, for 12 months of pre-commission training. This includes advanced weapon training, field tactics, leadership development, and physical conditioning. After the successful completion of the training, the candidate is commissioned as a lieutenant in the army.

==== Medical officers (AFMC) ====
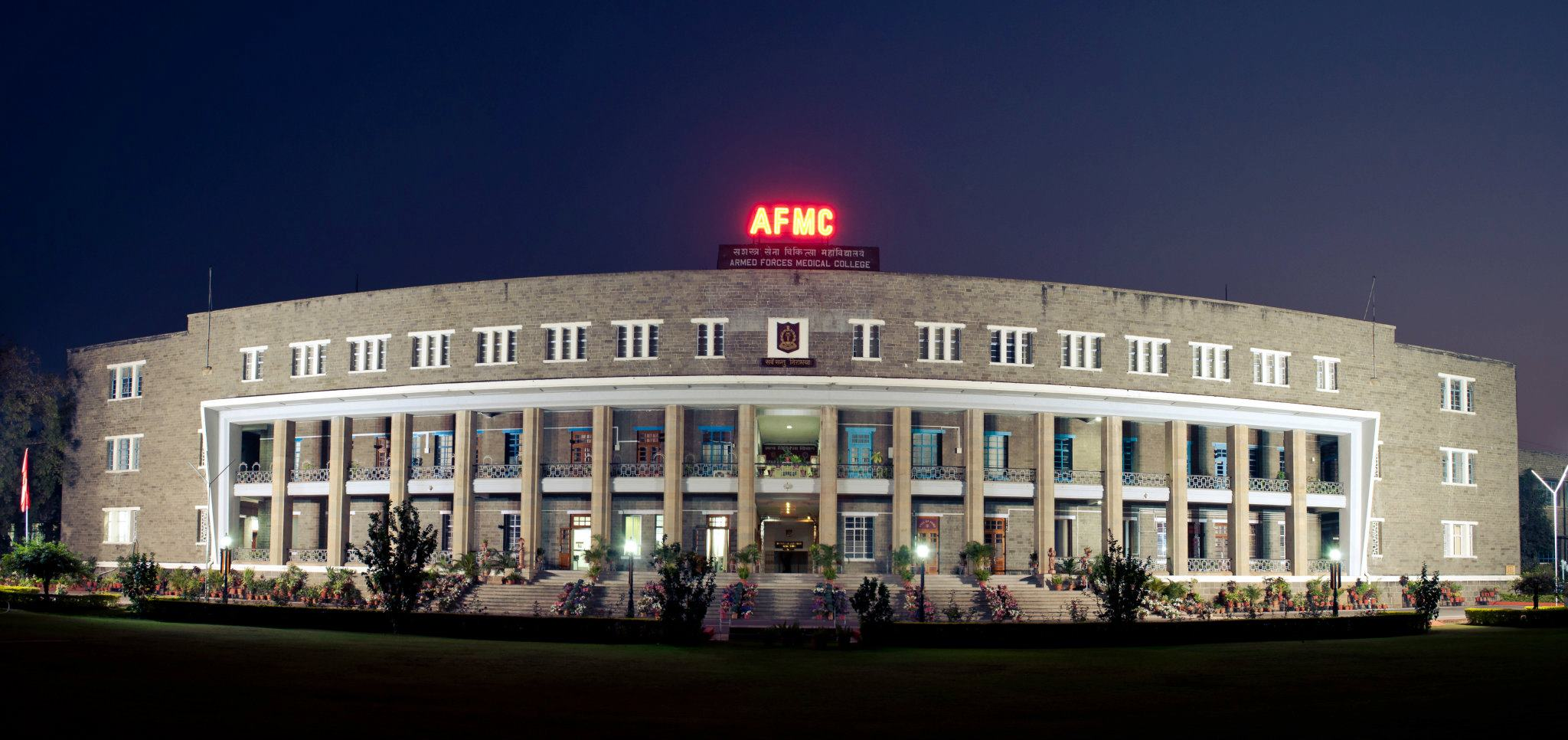
The AFMC is the only permanent commission officers (medical) training academy

The Armed Forces Medical College (AFMC) is India's premier military medical institution and the primary pathway to join the army as a medical officer (PC). It trains qualified physicians for the Armed Forces Medical Services (AFMS), which serves the Army, Navy, and Air Force. AFMC offers a fully funded MBBS program, after which graduates are commissioned as officers in the Army Medical Corps (AMC). The candidate applying must be an unmarried Indian citizen, aged 17 to 24 years. The candidate must have opted for Physics, Chemistry, Biology or Biotechnology and English in 10+2 with minimum 60% aggregate (50% minimum in each subject).

The selection is based shortlisting of candidates based on National Eligibility cum Entrance Test scores. Then shortlisted candidates attend a ToELR-WT test (Test of English Language, Comprehension, Logic, and Reasoning + Written Test) followed by Psychological Assessment, Interview Board, and document verification, and medical tests. The final merit list is preepared using NEET scores, ToELR-WT marks, and interview performance.

After the selection, the candidate obtains a Bachelor of Medicine, Bachelor of Surgery (MBBS) undergraduate degree from AFMC, along with basic military training. After completion of the course graduates are directly commissioned as Captains in the Army Medical Corps with a Permanent Commission. Around 150 seats are available every year in the AFMC, and 2.5 to 3 lakh NEET aspirants apply annually for these limited seats, making it the most competitive and academically challenging course in the Indian Armed Forces.

==== Technical Entry Scheme (TES) ====
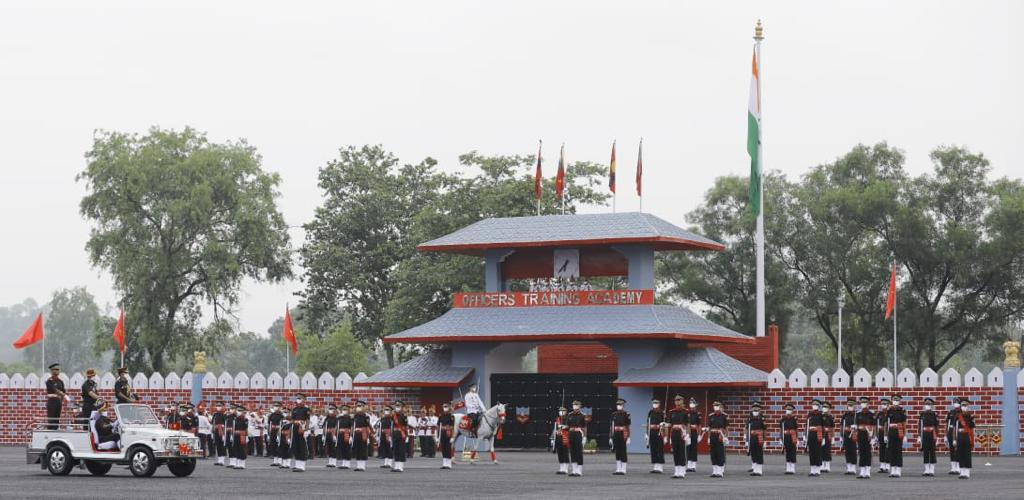
OTA, Gaya: Training academy engineering cadets, selected through TES

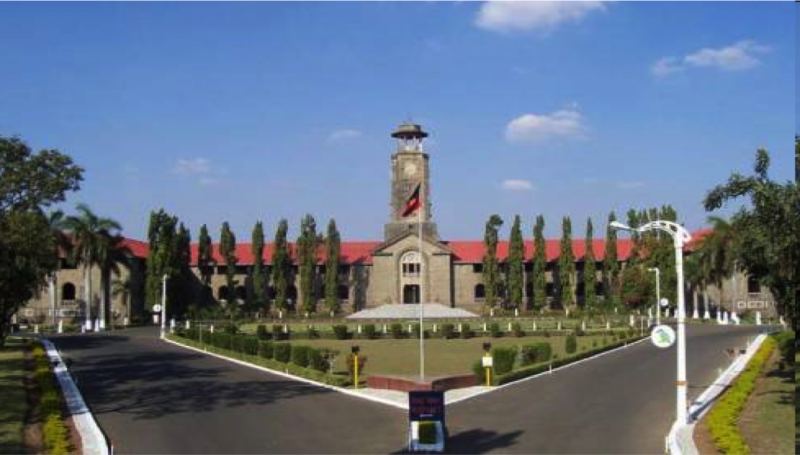
CME Pune, the professional training academy for the TES cadets

The Technical Entry Scheme (TES) is a specialized route for 10+2 students who have opted for Physics, Chemistry and Maths as their main subjects to join the Army as engineering officers in technical branches. Candidates applying for TES shall be unmarried male Indian citizens, aged 16½ to 19½ years, and must have passed 10+2 with Physics, Chemistry and Mathematics with at least 60% aggregate, and appeared in Joint Entrance Examination - Main with 85-90 percentile score. Unlike NDA or CDSE, TES has no written exam and selection is based on academic performance, SSB evaluation and final medical tests.

TES offers a 5-year integrated program, combining engineering education and military training:

In the first three years, academic engineering training at one of the Army's technical institutes like College of Military Engineering, MCEME, Secunderabad, or MCTE, Mhow. Cadets also undergo basic military training, discipline, and physical conditioning. In the last few years the cadets are trained at Officers Training Academy, Gaya. On successful completion of training, cadets are awarded a B.Tech degree in their engineering stream.

==== Technical Graduate Course ====
The Technical Graduate Course (TGC) is a direct entry scheme for engineering graduates to join the army as engineering officers in technical branches. It is available for candidates who have completed or are in the final year of their B.E./B.Tech and want to serve in core technical roles like Engineers, Signals, or EME. The candidate must be an unmarried male candidate, aged 20 to 27 years at the commencement of the course and must have completed or be in the final year of an engineering degree in a stream notified in the TGC recruitment notification (e.g., Civil, Mechanical, Electronic, Computer Science). Around 30–40 seats, distributed across engineering streams like Civil, Mechanical, ECE, CSE, etc. are available each year, and the interview process is similar to TES.

=== Enlisted (Agnipath) ===
==== Soldier (Gorkha — General Duty) ====
Since the introduction of the Agnipath Scheme in 2022, India has shifted to inducting Gorkha troops exclusively through this new recruitment system. However, the Government of Nepal strongly opposed the scheme, stating that its four-year short-term service contracts and absence of long-term benefits were inconsistent with the principles of the historic 1947 Britain–India–Nepal Tripartite Agreement, which has governed the recruitment of Gorkhas for decades. As a result, Nepal has refused to allow its citizens to participate in Agnipath recruitment.

This deadlock has led to a complete halt in the recruitment of Nepali Gorkhas for nearly five years, creating deep uncertainty for thousands of aspiring candidates and casting doubt on the future of the legendary Gorkha regiments, which have been an integral part of the army for over seven decades.

Traditionally, India recruits Gorkha soldiers who are citizens of Nepal under the framework of the Tripartite Agreement. To qualify, a candidate shall be aged between 17.3 and 21 years and must have successfully completed Class 10 and hold a matriculation certificate from a recognized educational board. Following this, the candidate must undergo a rigorous physical and medical examination, demonstrating excellent physical fitness, 6/6 eyesight, and being completely free of deformities, disorders, or diseases that could impair service.

Gorkha candidates are provided special height relaxation compared to the general requirements for the Western Plains region. As per current standards, the minimum height required for Gorkha recruits is 157 centimetres, with a minimum weight of 48 kilograms and a chest measurement of 77 centimetres (with a 5 cm expansion).

== Equipment ==
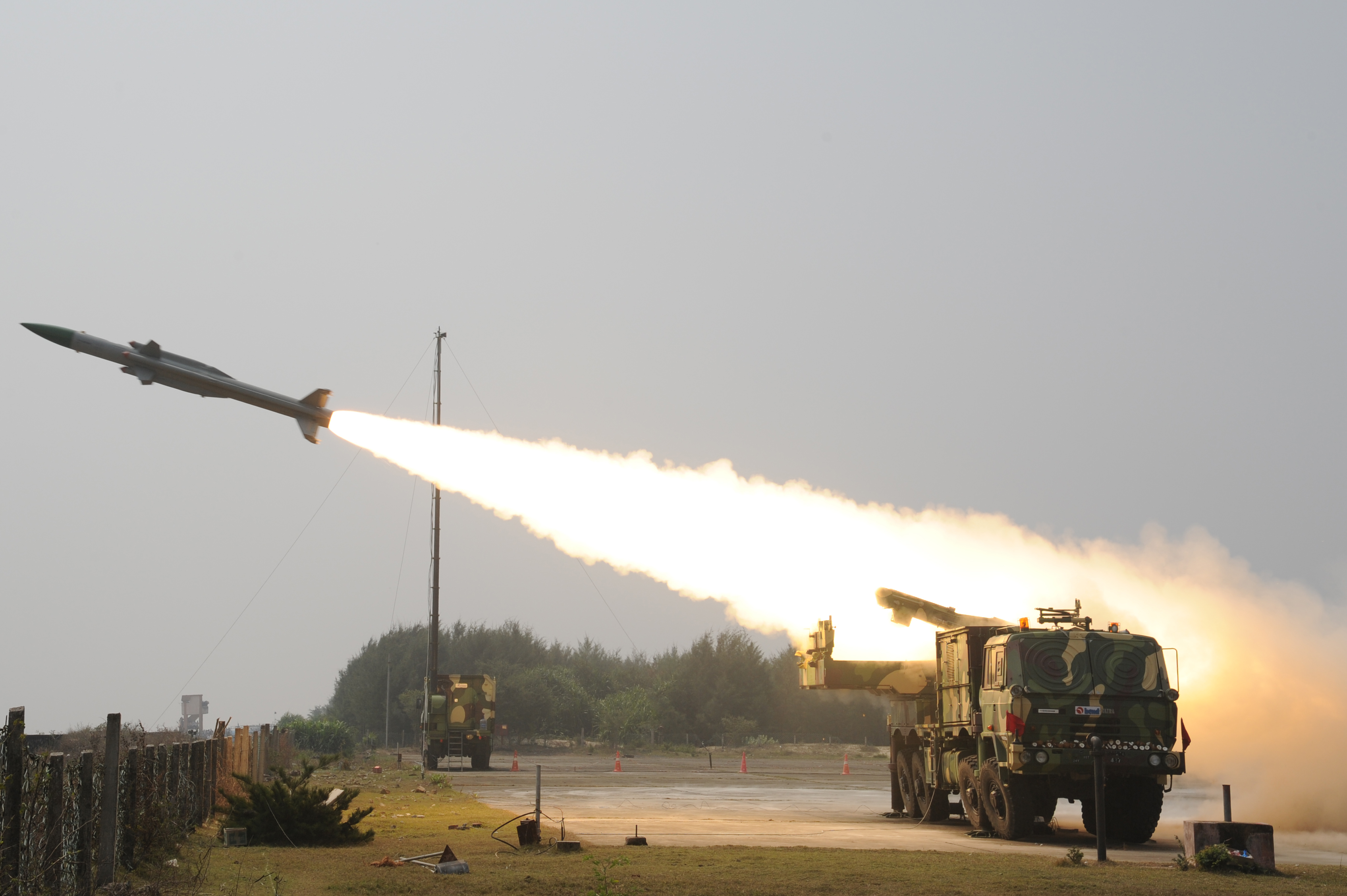
Akash Surface to Air Missile

Most of the army equipment is imported, but efforts are being made to manufacture indigenous equipment. The Defence Research and Development Organisation has developed a range of weapons for the Indian Army, including small arms, artillery, radars, and the Arjun tank. All Indian military small-arms are manufactured under the umbrella administration of the Ordnance Factories Board, with principal firearm manufacturing facilities in Ichhapore, Cossipore, Kanpur, Jabalpur, and Tiruchirapalli. The Indian Small Arms System (INSAS) rifle, which has been successfully deployed since 1997, is a product of Rifle Factory Ishapore, while ammunition is manufactured at Khadki, and possibly at Bolangir.

In 2014, Army chief General Bikram Singh said that if given sufficient budget support, the Indian Army might be able to acquire half the ammunition needed to fight in a major conflict by the next year.

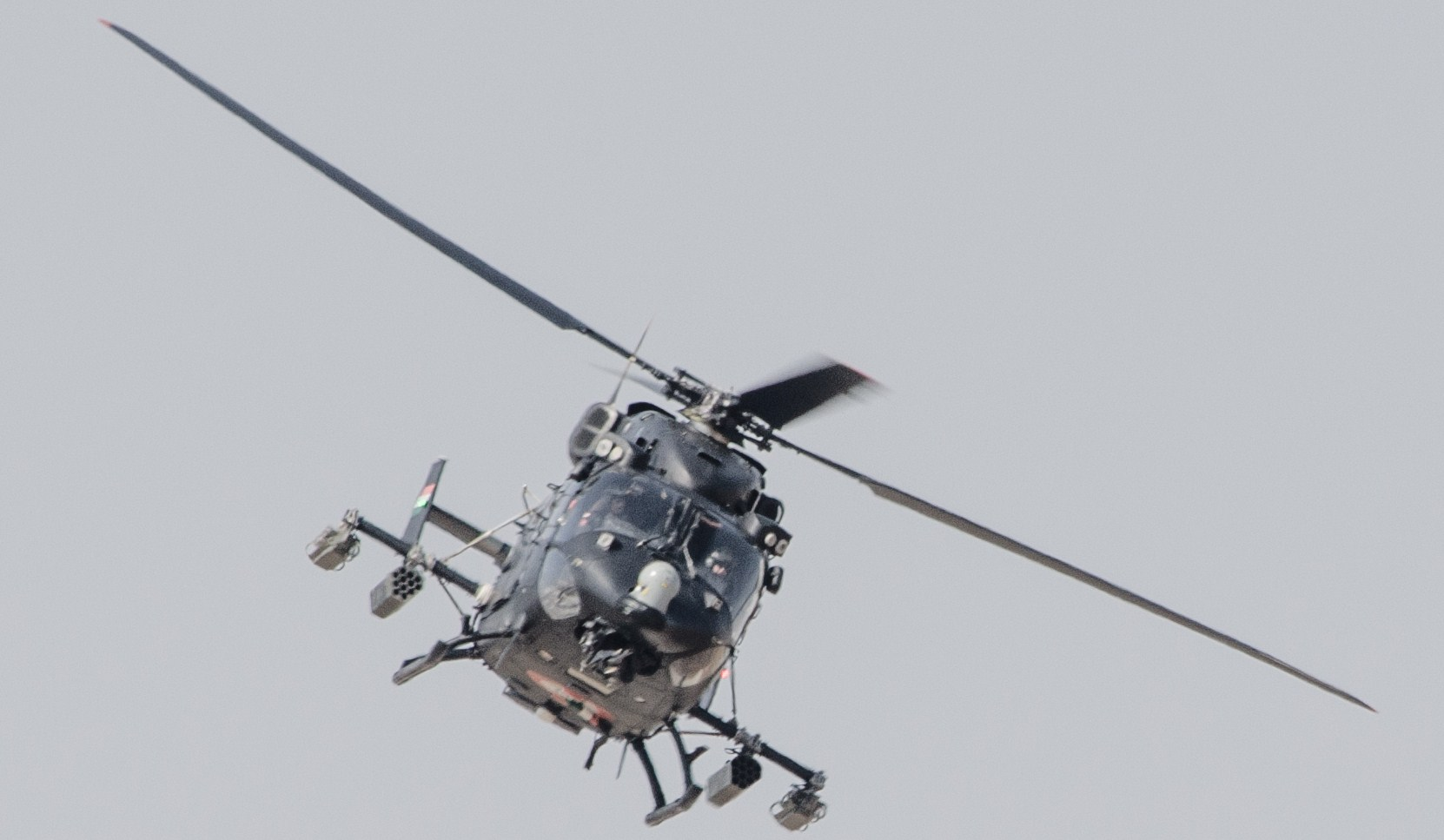
HAL Rudra

=== Aircraft ===
The Army Aviation Corps is the main body of the Indian Army for tactical air transport, reconnaissance, and medical evacuation, while the Indian Air Force's helicopter assets are responsible for assisting army troop transport and close air support. The Aviation Corps operates approximately 150 helicopters. The Indian army had projected a requirement for a helicopter that can carry loads of up to 750 kilograms (1,650 lb) to heights of 7,000 m (23,000 ft) on the Siachen Glacier in Jammu and Kashmir. Flying at these heights poses unique challenges due to the rarefied atmosphere. The Indian Army will induct the HAL Light Utility Helicopter to replace its ageing fleet of Chetaks and Cheetahs, some of which were deployed more than three decades ago.

On 13 October 2012, the defence minister gave control of attack helicopters to the Indian Army, which had formerly rested the Indian Air force.

=== Future developments ===
The major ongoing weapons programmes of the Indian Army are as follows:

- F-INSAS is the Indian Army's principal infantry modernisation programme, which aims to modernise the army's 465 infantry and paramilitary battalions by 2020. The programme aims to upgrade the infantry to a multi-calibre rifle with an under-barrel grenade launcher, as well as bulletproof jackets and helmets. The helmet would include a visor, flashlight, thermal sensors, night vision devices, and a miniature computer with an audio headset. There would also be a new lightweight and waterproof uniform, which would help the soldier in carrying extra loads and fighting in an NBC environment.
- In 2008, the Cabinet Committee on Security approved raising two new infantry mountain divisions (with around 15,000 combat soldiers each) and an artillery brigade. These divisions were likely to be armed with ultralight howitzers. In July 2009, it was reported that the Army was advocating a new artillery division. The proposed artillery division, to be under the Kolkata-based Eastern Command, was to have three brigades – two armed with 155 mm howitzers and one with the Russian "Smerch" and indigenous "Pinaka" multiple-launch rocket systems.
- In February 2024, reports emerged for the formation of a new corps under the Central Command for deployment along Line of Actual Control (LAC). The XVIII Corps would consist of at least one division (with around 15,000 to 18,000 combat soldiers each) and three independent brigades. This includes 14 RAPID Division, 9 Mountain Brigade, 136 Mountain Brigade and 119 Mountain Brigade. This move will convert HQ Uttar Bharat from a Static Formation into 'Full-fledged Combat Arm'. This move is in a proposal stage in the Army and will be forwarded to the Ministry of Defence for clearance.
- In April 2024, Indian Army proposed two new formations. One of them was the creation of an "adversial force" acting as opposing force which will represent an enemy force in wargames. The other one is a "test-bed brigades or formation" which will enhance the efficiency of testing new weapons for procurement.

== Force modernisation and reorganisation ==
The Indian Army planned to undergo a phased restructuring from 2023 in order to become a lean, agile, and technologically advanced military. The internal study report Re-organization and Rightsizing of the Indian Army from 2022 served as its foundation. As part of the restructuring, the Chief of the Army Staff General Upendra Dwivedi ordered the creation of the Rudra all-arms brigades, Bhairav light commando battalions, Shaktibaan artillery regiments and Divyastra batteries on 25 July 2025. He announced these approvals in Drass War Memorial on 26 July on the occasion of Kargil Vijay Diwas. Additionally, he also announced that each infantry battalion is also equipped with drone platoons. In multi-domain battlefields dominated by information, digitization, automation, precision, and AI, Rudra and Bhairav are built for quick and decisive action. The Chief of the Army Staff General Upendra Dwivedi called these restructuring moves as Indian Army's approach as a “transformative, modern, and future-oriented force”.

On 10 August, it was reported that the Indian Army has issued "specific orders" with "implementation instructions" to undertake these major reorganisations through “Save and Raise” mode which will not have an effect on the defence budget.

On 22 October, director general (infantry), Lieutenant General Ajay Kumar, announced the completion of raising 380 'Ashni' specialist drone platoons with each of the 380 infantry battalions. Each platoon employs 20–25 soldiers and is equipped with loitering munitions and drones to perform intelligence, surveillance and reconnaissance (ISR) roles. The Army is procuring six types of loitering munitions and four types of ISR drones for the infantry.

=== Integrated Battle Groups ===
The concept of combined arms operations was first demonstrated with the Indian Army in a field exercises in Punjab in 2013. The idea was later reintroduced in 2018 by the then CoAS General Bipin Rawat as Integrated Battle Group (IBG).

The Integrated Battle Groups would be Brigade-sized, self-sufficient combined arms formations commanded by an officer of the rank major general. The IBGs are meant to transform the overall field formation of the Indian Army. By July 2019, the new concept of formations had been test-bedded with the IX Corps (Rising Star Corps) and were being re-organised based on the basis of feedbacks. The formation of a specific IBG and its resource allocation would depend on three T's — Threat, Terrain and Task. The formation would have mobilisation time of 12–48 hours. The IBG will replace the traditional field formation of Commands–Corps–Divisions–Brigades with Commands and corps being the largest static formation spread across a defined geography and the largest mobile formation, respectively. The composition of IBG also depends on its nature — offensive or defensive. While Offensive IBG will be designed to be mobilised at the earliest to thrust into enemy territory for strike operations, the Defensive IBG will be tasked to hold ground at vulnerable points where enemy action is expected.

In October 2019, the 59 Infantry Division of the XVII Corps (Brahmastra Corps) conducted the first military exercise to validate the concept of Integrated Battle Groups (IBG). Exercise Him Vijay included three IBGs of the division. The aim was to reduce the response time Cold Start Doctrine's 72 hours to under 24 hours. By May 2022, the IBGs were test-bedded by IX Corps and further validated by the XVII Corps. The Army identified these Holding Corps in the Western Front and the Strike Corps in the Northern/Eastern Front for total 'IBG-isation' parallel to the formation of the larger Integrated Theatre Commands of the Armed Forces.

By June 2024, two and five IBGs under IX Corps and XVII Corps were raised under the first and second phases, respectively. These formations also participated in wargames and were validated in multiple scenarios. Though the Army HQ had earlier submitted the report on Phase 1 of 'IBG-isation', the Defence Ministry also demanded the same for Phase 2 before the official Government Sanction Letter (GSL) can be issued. The original plan was to initially carve out 8–10 IBGs (5,000 to 6,000 troops each) and followed by more over the years. By November, the Army submitted a draft GSL seeking official approval for the establishment of the IBGs. The issuing of the GSL implied the approval for the implementation of IBGs. Post approval, the Army aimed to have the IBGs operational by 2025.

During the annual press conference on 15 January 2025, on the occasion of the Army Day, CoAS General Upendra Dwivedi said that the Integrated Battle Groups will be either implemented by 2025 given the approval is granted otherwise the project will be totally abandoned. The proposals were in the final stages of approval and has financial as well as equipment and human resources implications. "It is the first Special Purpose Vehicle (SPV) as far as the restructuring is concerned. If it goes through, others will also follow suit," as per the COAS stated by a report. Some top-of-the-rack changes in the Northern Theatre Command has been identified to implement the IBGs and will incorporate lessons learnt from Exercise Him Vijay 2019. The IBGs could be equipped to lead surgical strike-like operations in case of a war unlike the current structure of the Army where the same role is carried out by Strike Corps.

In January 2026, a report revealed plans of the Indian Army to convert two Divisions under XVII Corps. The plans have been fast-tracked according to sources. The IBGs will comprise a major general-ranked commanding officer with a size of over 5,000 troops but without any brigade commander. The IBG will be able to draw logistics and other support elements from units placed under its respective Corps HQ, while a dedicated group can also be established to draw fire support. However, their implementation remains under discussion and could be further refined before deployment. The approach to capability development is based on capacity assessments, not on a threat-based model.

On 29 June, reports indicated that the formation of the XVII Corps will be restructured into four integrated battle groups and a fire support group, Each of which will be commanded by a Major General-ranked commanding officer. The will be operationalised from 1 July onwards in a phased manner. The four IBGs will be subordinate to the 59 Division and 23 Division of the corps. The timeline for the formations has been expedited; they were previously expected to be formed in September. The IBG will be composed of 5,000 soldiers organised into 12–13 sub units and is expected to have a brigadier-ranked chief operations officer. They will have battalions from the infantry, artillery regiments, as well as elements of the Corps of Electronics and Mechanical Engineers (EME), Combat Engineers, Army Service Corps, and a field hospital among others. Meanwhile, the FSG will be composed of artillery platforms and will directly report to the corps commander. The newly formed Divyastra batteries may be placed under the FSG.

=== Rudra all-arms brigades ===
On the occasion of 26th Kargil Vijay Diwas, the COAS announced that he had approved the formation of Rudra all-arms brigades a day earlier, on 25 July 2025 and that two brigades deployed on the border has already been converted to Rudra brigades. As part of the plan, 250 single-arm brigades — with over 3,000 soldiers each — are to be converted to all-arms ones with integration of fighting elements like infantry, mechanised infantry, armoured (tanks), Special Forces as well as support elements like artillery, engineers, air defence, electronic warfare and UAVs (unmanned aerial vehicles). The formations will receive specially prepared logistics for support and combat support.

Though, the design of the Rudra brigades is based on the concept of integrated battle groups, there are few but major modifications. Firstly, while an IBG was conceptualised to be a scaled-down Division, the Rudra brigades are not so but are slightly larger than standard brigades. Secondly, IBGs were envisioned to be commanded by a major general, eliminating the rank of brigadier. However, the Rudra brigades will have a brigadier- ranked commanding officer.

Reportedly, the two Rudra brigades that are already formed will be operationalised in eastern Ladakh and Sikkim likely under IX Corps and XVII Corps, respectively, within few months.

The Rudra Brigade under the Konark Corps of the Southern Command was operationally validated during Exercise Akhand Prahaar under the Tri Service Exercise (TSE) Trishul in early November 2025. With the operationalisation of these brigades, the Army reportedly plans to upgrade its Cold Start military doctrine to "Cold Strike". The term was coined by a retired Army officer, Lieutenant General A B Shivane and later used by the commanding officer of Southern Command, Lieutenant General Dhiraj Seth.

=== Bhairav Light Commando Battalions ===
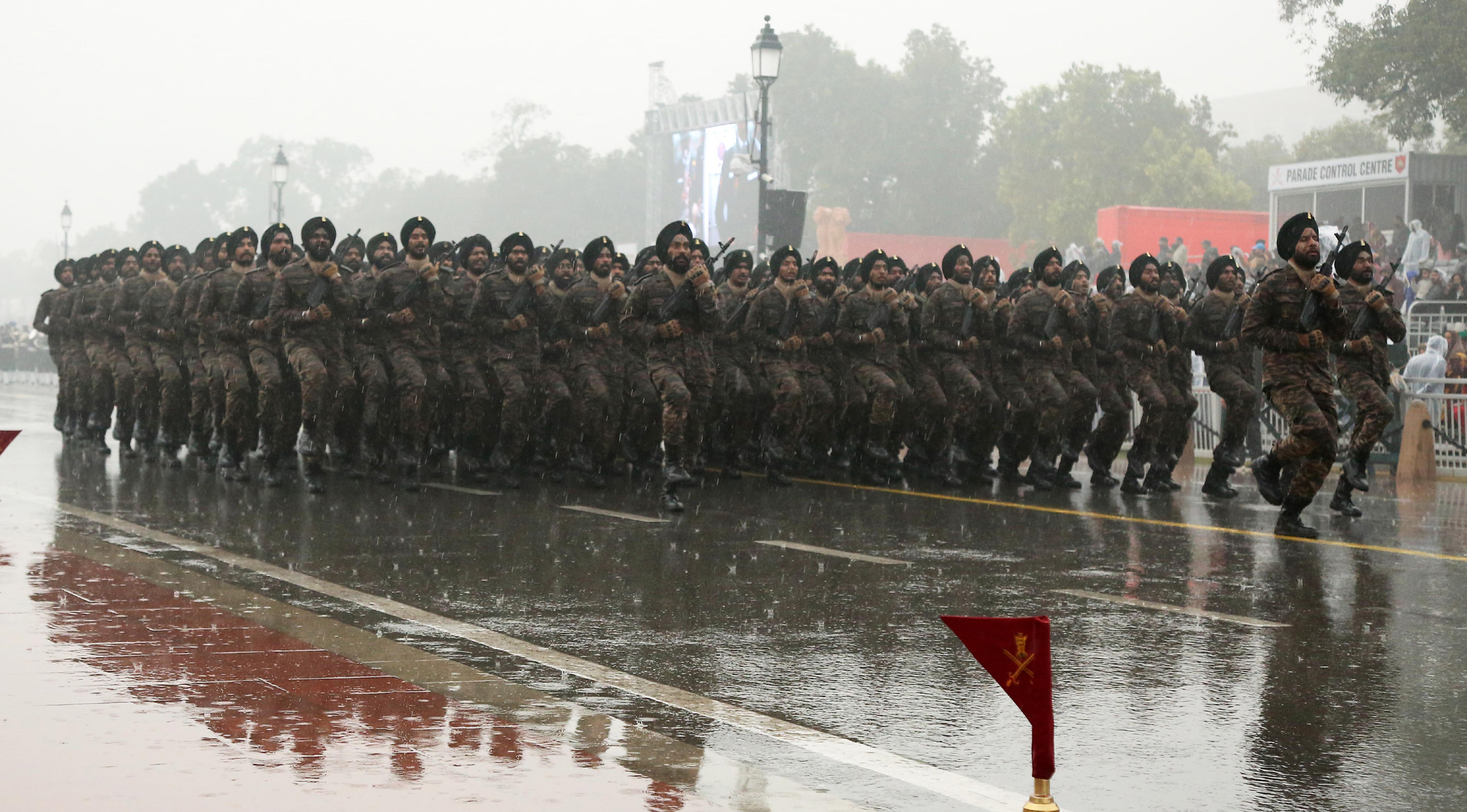
Bhairav Battalion Marching

Bhairav Battalions are another type of formation that is being raised by the Indian Army. The battalion has a strength of 250 personnel, including 78 officers, which is much less than that of a standard infantry battalion (800 soldiers) or a Parachute Regiment battalion (620 soldiers). AK-203 is the standard issue rifle for the Bhairav light commandos. These agile and compact battalions, evolving from the Ghatak Platoon concept, are designed as shock troops to undertake clandestine missions or deliver surprise strikes under high-risk conditions the enemy lines to inflict maximum damage. The units are being raised under the long-standing “son of the soil” concept, in which soldiers are recruited from the areas they will be called upon to defend, in order to recruit soldiers with local knowledge and connections, as well as a direct personal stake in defending their communities. The Army Chief has tasked the individual Infantry Regimental Centres to select, train, and depute personnel from their respective units, which will be affiliated with and operate alongside specific corps. The selected soldiers will be trained for 2–3 months for their first phase under the Regimental Centre, followed by a month-long second phase of advanced training under the aegis of Special Forces training centres of the troops' respective deployment theatres. These units will be lighter armed and less strategically tasked than the Special Forces, serving instead as a bridge between Special Forces and regular infantry, thereby freeing the former for more critical operations.

As per a report on 14 August, the Indian Army plans to have five such battalions by the end of 31 October. From the five battalions, three of the battalions will be assigned to the Northern Command with one each for XIV Corps, XV Corps and XVI Corps, while one each will be deployed in the Western and the Northeastern sectors. The battalions will be tasked for roles like cross-border interdiction, reconnaissance and disruption of adversary positions. Ultimately, 23 Bhairav Battalions are planned to be raised.

As of 22 October, the service will raise 25 Bhairav battalions within six months. Meanwhile, five battalions, as earlier planned, have already been deployed and their training programme will culminate on 30 October, following which, the battalions will be operationalised. Additionally, four additional battalions are being raised.

As of 4 January 2026, the Army has raised 15 such battalions. The 4 Bhairav battalion, formed from the Sikh Light Infantry Regiment, participated in the 77th Delhi Republic Day parade in 2026. Additionally, on the same occasion, the 6 Bhairav of the Eastern Command also took part in the Red Road parade in Kolkata. A report on 27 January by the Hindustan Times indicated that the Army had raised 21 Bhairav battalions.

On 25 April 2026, the 16 'Bhairav' Battalion was raised and commissioned by Brigadier Joydeep Mukherjee, commandant of the Maratha Light Infantry Regimental Centre in Belgaum. The battalion flag was presented to the commanding officer of the newly raised unit.

Under the "Son of the Soil" concept, the soldiers are in listed from the same region where the unit is to be deployed. This ensures that the soldiers are familiar with the area’s geography, language and social conditions. Hence, they operate more efficiently because of their inherent knowledge of the terrain.

List of known Bhairav Battalions
Battalion	Nickname	Corps	Command	Affiliated Regiment	Ref
6 Bhairav		III Corps	Eastern Command		
2 Bhairav	Desert Falcon	XII Corps	Southern Command		
—N/a		XIV Corps	Northern Command		
—N/a		XV Corps	Northern Command		
—N/a		XVI Corps	Northern Command		
4 Bhairav				Sikh Light Infantry	
16 Bhairav				Maratha Light Infantry	

=== Shaktibaan regiments and Divyastra batteries ===
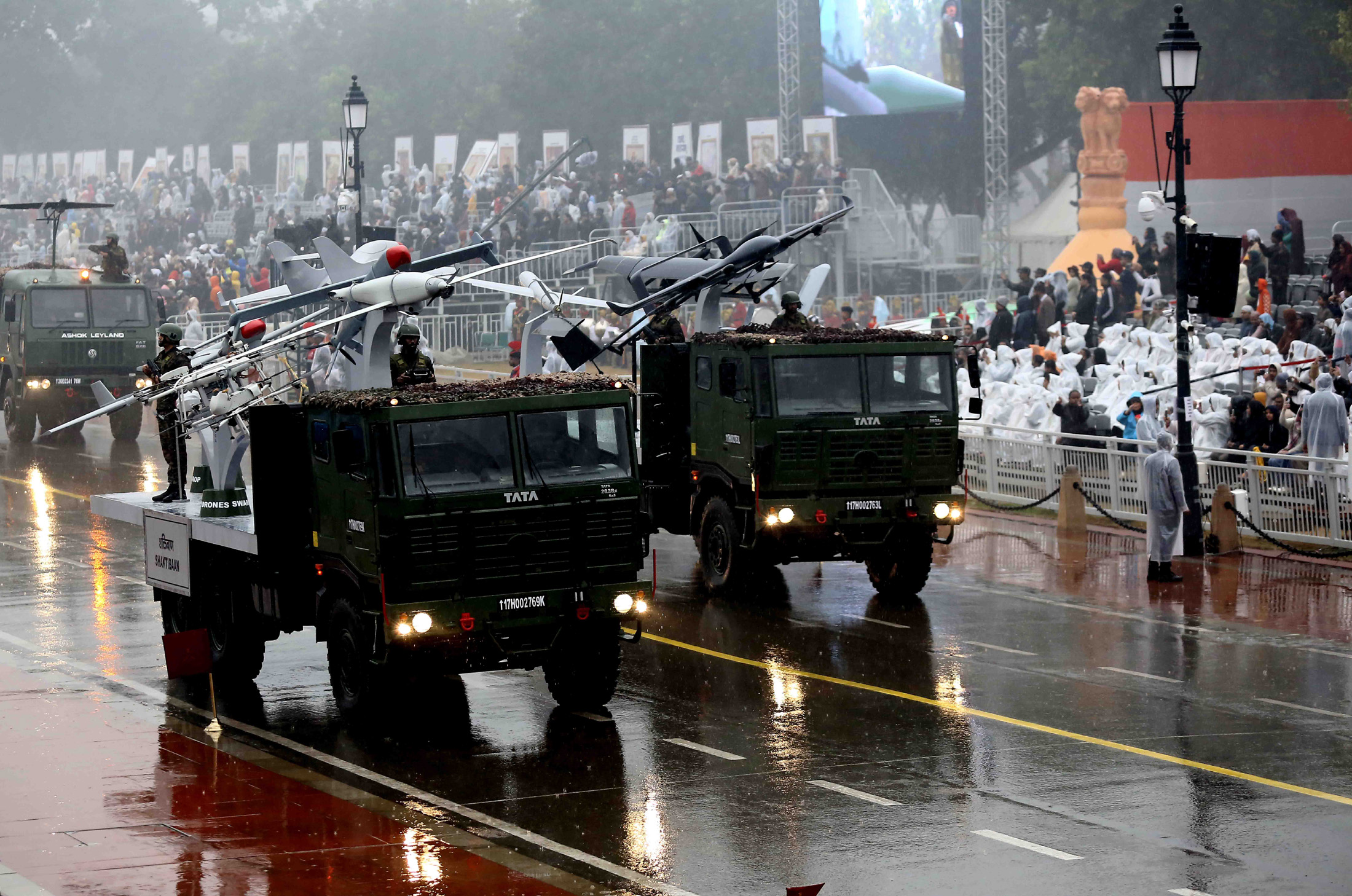
Shaktibaan drones.

The Indian Army will also reorganise the Artillery Regiments to adapt with modern battlefield needs.

Each newly raised Shaktibaan regiment will be purely technology-driven units with the objective of "see-and-strike" operations and will include three batteries, with two of them operating long- and medium-range loitering munitions and the third operating swarm drones and remotely piloted aircraft system (RPAS). The regiments are being raised under "Save and Raise" format, implying restructuring existing assets and infrastructure rather than forming entirely new units.

Additionally, each traditional artillery regiment will be equipped with a Divyastra Battery. These will be composite batteries equipped with loitering munitions as well as dual-role RPAs and operating alongside the two batteries equipped with eight medium artillery guns each. The configuration will enable sensor-to-shoot networking and integrate real-time surveillance and engagement into an independent unit.

Under the first phase, five artillery regiments are expected to be introduced with Divyastra batteries by the end of August 2025. On 29 December 2025, the Defence Acquisition Council (DAC) cleared the Indian Army proposal to procure 850 loitering munitions with launchers worth ₹2,000 crore (equivalent to ₹21 billion or US$220 million in 2026) from Indian sources. The munitions will equip the Shaktibaan regiments and Divyastra batteries of the Indian Army Regiment of Artillery. This is part of an overall procurement of 30,000 such munitions to equip all three defence forces as well as special forces. The contracts, worth ₹1,557 crore (equivalent to ₹16 billion or US$170 million in 2026), were signed for 840 loitering munition systems — the largest-ever single purchase of such systems — at a fast-tracked procedure on 14 August 2026 with Tata Advanced Systems and NIBE Limited, who secured the lowest (L1) and second lowest (L2) bidders, respectively. While TASL will deliver 54 systems with 540 loitering munitions at a cost of ₹1,013.77 crore (US$110 million), NIBE will deliver 30 Vayu Astra-1 systems with 300 loitering munitions at a cost of ₹563.36 crore (US$60 million). The munitions have been tested at various high-altitude and desert theatres and haveen validated with a range of up to 100 km. The deliveries will be completed within 12 months.

=== Shaurya squadron ===
The Shaurya squadron was introduced during its validation trials in March 2026. These drone warfare units are part of the Armoured Regiment of the Armoured Corps. Six squadrons have been activated under five Army commands as of 27 March, one of which took part in the 13-day long Amogh Jwala exercise. The exercise was conducted at the Babina Field Firing Ranges near Jhansi by the 31st Armoured Division (White Tiger Division) under the XXI Corps (Sudarshan Chakra Corps). The roles of the squadron includes precision strikes, combat support and electronic warfare. However, the concept of drone integration is still at a nascent stage and more trials were necessary before a formal approval is received and the units are raised formally.

=== Baaz Battalion ===
Another formation dedicated for Remotely Piloted Aircraft operation are being raised as of 30 June 2026. These formations are built on RPA and R&O flights of the Army Aviation Corps. They will employ a specialised cadre of trained personnel for operating and managing Army's expanding arsenal of remotely piloted aerial systems.

== See also ==
- Centre for Land Warfare Studies
- List of serving generals of the Indian Army
- Central Armed Police Forces
- Army Day (India)
- Indian National Army
- Indian Army United Nations peacekeeping missions
- Army Red Football Club
- Army Green Football Club
- Uniforms of the Indian Army

== Bibliography ==
- Gutteridge, William (1963). "The Indianisation of the Indian Army 1918-45". Race. 4 (2): 39–46. doi:10.1177/030639686300400205.
- International Institute for Strategic Studies (2010). Hackett, James (ed.). The Military Balance 2010. London: Routledge. ISBN 978-1-85743-557-3.
- International Institute for Strategic Studies (7 March 2012). Hackett, James (ed.). The Military Balance 2012. London: Routledge. ISBN 978-1-85743-642-6.
- International Institute for Strategic Studies (3 February 2014). The Military Balance 2014. London: Routledge. ISBN 978-1-85743-722-5.
- Mazumder, Rajit K. The Indian Army and the making of Punjab (Orient Blackswan, 2003) online.
- Omissi, David. The Sepoy and the Raj: the Indian army, 1860-1940 (Springer, 2016) online
- Praval, K.C. Indian Army After Independence (3rd ed. 2013) online
- Rose, Patrick. The Indian Army, 1939-47: experience and development (Routledge, 2016) online.
- Sundaram, Chandar S. Indianization, the Officer Corps, and the Indian Army: The Forgotten Debate, 1817–1917 (Lexington Books, 2019) online book review
- Wilkinson, Steven I. Army and Nation: The Military and Indian Democracy since Independence. (Harvard University Press, 2015).
