= Indian Navy ranks and insignia =

The Indian Navy (IN), the naval component of the Indian Armed Forces follows a certain hierarchy of rank designations and insignia derived from the erstwhile Royal Indian Navy (RIN).

== History ==
The Indian Naval Ensign.

=== 1947–2023 ===
Upon the establishment of establishment of India's independence in 1947, the country became a dominion within the British Commonwealth of Nations; nevertheless, the armed forces, namely, the British Indian Army (BIA), the Royal Indian Navy (RIN) and the Royal Indian Air Force (RIAF) - under the helm of King George VI as the Commander-in-Chief, retained their respective pre-independence ranks and corresponding insignia.

In May 1949, Lord Mountbatten, the inaugural Governor-General of India and himself a naval officer, dispatched a note to Prime Minister Jawaharlal Nehru, titled Names and Insignia of Indian Armed Forces, containing a list of suggestions regarding the nomenclature of the armed forces that were to be enforced upon the dominion's conversion to a republic. In the note, Mountbatten proposed that the future IN should retain its predecessor's nomenclature as much as possible - advocating the retention of the RIN's ranks, insignia and uniforms; the only exemption to these retentions was the force's naval ensign, which was modified to feature the Indian tricolor as a substitute for the Union Jack. In September 1949, Nehru forwarded the proposals to the country's minister of defence, Baldev Singh, recommending Mountbatten's suggestions, which were consequently enforced upon India's emergence as a republic on 26 January 1950.

=== 2023 modifications ===
In December 2022, Admiral R. Hari Kumar, the IN's Chief of the Naval Staff (CNS), proposed several alterations to the force's rank structure, namely, a proposal to drop the rank of Petty Officer and to integrate IN ranks with that of the IA and the IAF, reasoning the present rank nomenclature reflected of what was termed by several as a colonial mindset.

Following a review of the IN rank structure in October 2023, the IN announced that the rank nomenclature of the Personnel Below Officer Rank (PBOR) cadre would be revised to reflect a gender-neutral perspective. Multiple sources indicated that the seven ranks of the PBOR cadre would be allotted Indian-origin names. In March 2024, R. Hari Kumar suggested that "seaman" be replaced with the gender-neutral "nausainik" (navy soldier).

Consequently, the revision plan was publicized during the IN's 2023 Navy Day celebrations, when prime minister Narendra Modi announced that the rank structure's designations would be retitled with domestic names to reflect Indian-origin traditions, while the shoulder board epaulettes worn by flag officers would be altered to bear the octagonal-shaped naval crest, which had been adopted by the IN the previous year. Accordingly, the alterations to the flag officer insignia were revealed later that month; notably, other observable emendations in the new insignia included the introduction of an Indian sword-cum-telescope design instead of the older sword-cum-baton design and a gold button embossed with a clear anchor instead of a fouled anchor.

In 2025, news came out reporting that the rollout of the new names had stalled.

== Structure ==
Presently, the IN's rank hierarchy is divided into four broad categories:

- Commissioned Officers
- Junior Commissioned Officers (JCO)
- Other Ranks (OR)
  - Non-Commissioned Officers (NCO)
  - Enlisted

Equivalent ranks of Indian military
Commission	Indian Navy	Indian Army	Indian Air Force
Commissioned	Admiral of the fleet	Field marshal	Marshal of the Indian Air Force
Commissioned	Admiral	General	Air chief marshal
Commissioned	Vice admiral	Lieutenant general	Air marshal
Commissioned	Rear admiral	Major general	Air vice marshal
Commissioned	Commodore	Brigadier	Air commodore
Commissioned	Captain	Colonel	Group captain
Commissioned	Commander	Lieutenant colonel	Wing commander
Commissioned	Lieutenant commander	Major	Squadron leader
Commissioned	Lieutenant	Captain	Flight lieutenant
Commissioned	Sub lieutenant	Lieutenant	Flying officer
Junior commissioned	Master chief petty officer 1st class	Subedar major (Note: Risaldar major in cavalry and armoured regiments)	Master warrant officer
Junior commissioned	Master chief petty officer 2nd class	Subedar (Note: Risaldar in cavalry and armoured regiments)	Warrant officer
Junior commissioned	Chief petty officer	Naib subedar (Note: Naib risaldar in cavalry and armoured regiments. Called jemadar until 1965.)	Junior warrant officer
Non-commissioned	Petty officer	Havildar/Daffadar	Sergeant
Non-commissioned	Leading seaman	Naik/Lance daffadar	Corporal
Non-commissioned	Seaman 1	Lance naik/Acting Lance-Daffadar	Leading aircraftsman
Non-commissioned	Seaman 2	Sepoy/Sowar	Aircraftsman

=== Commissioned officers ===
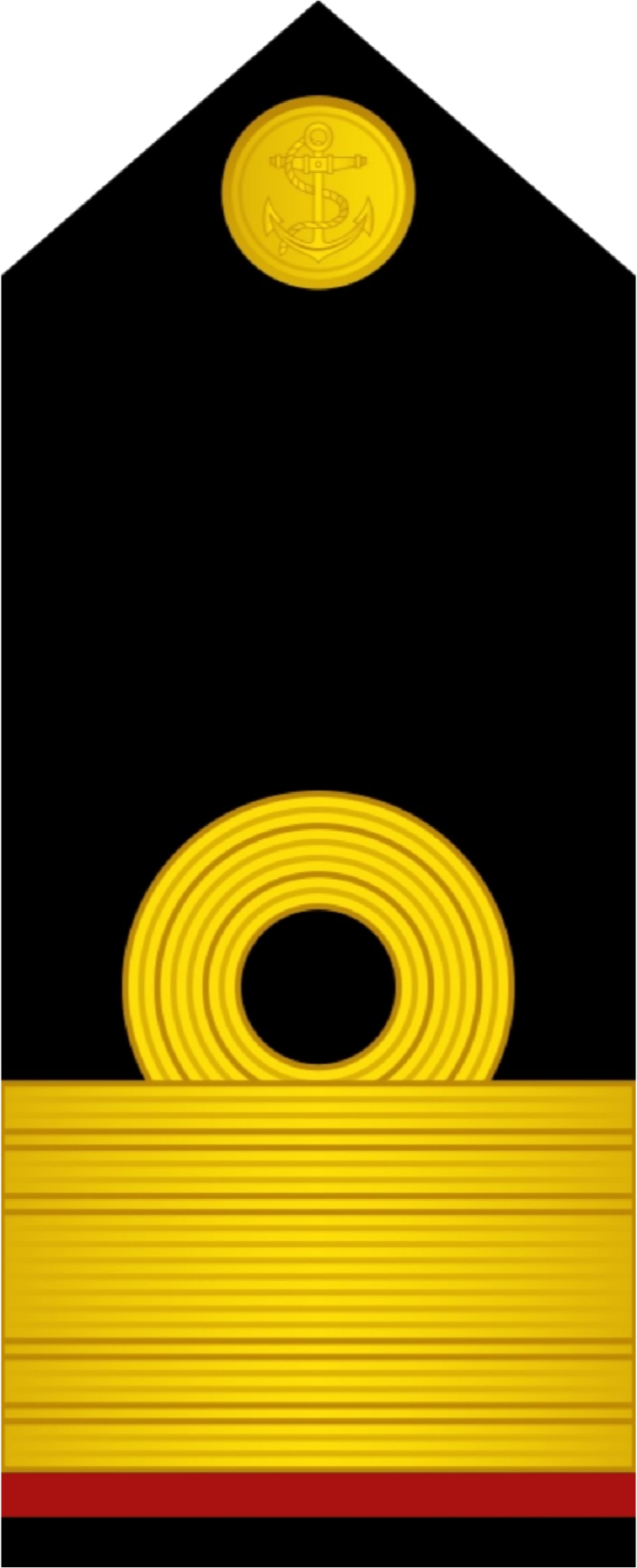
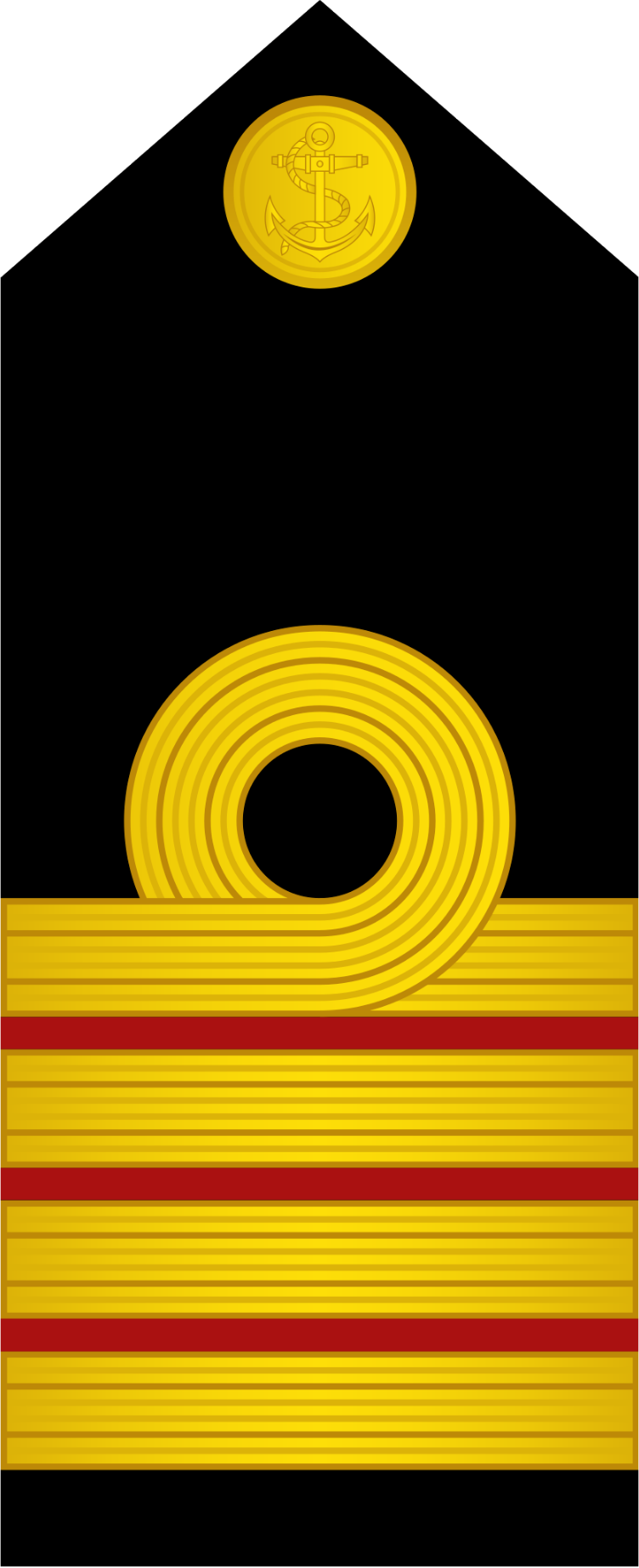
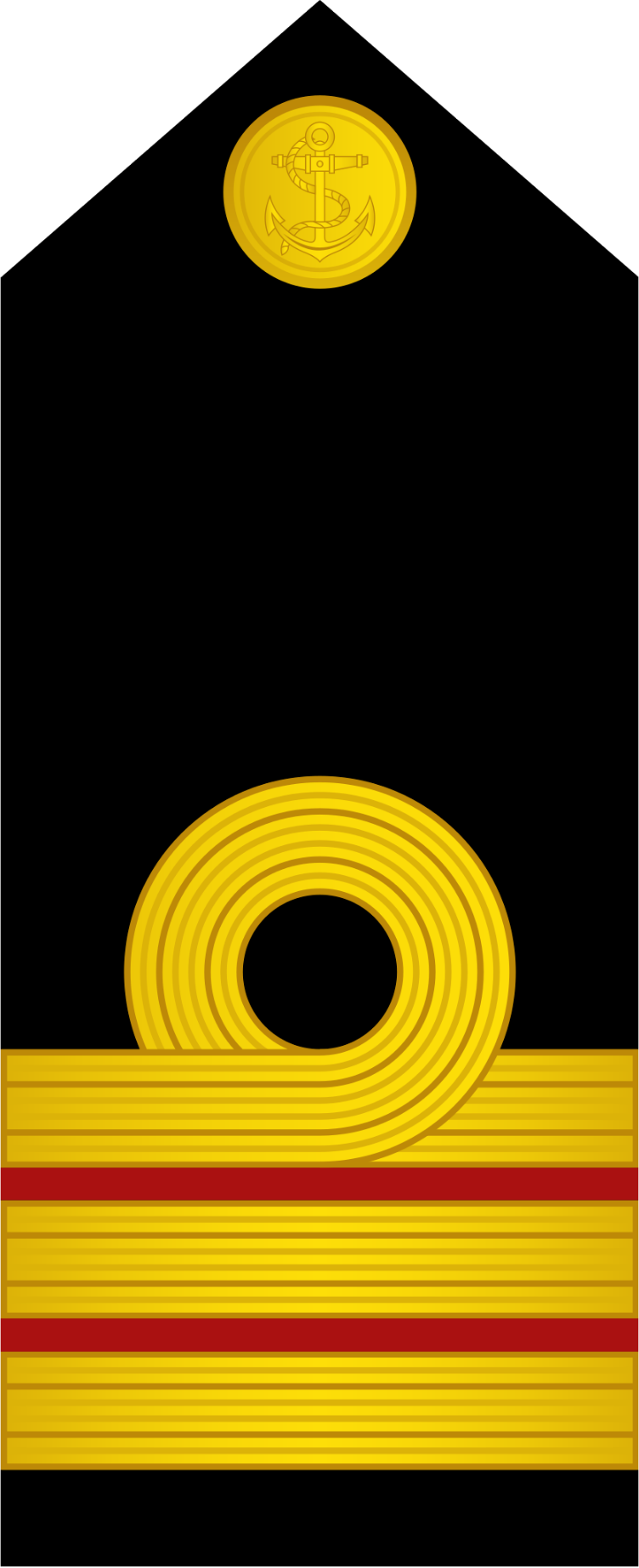
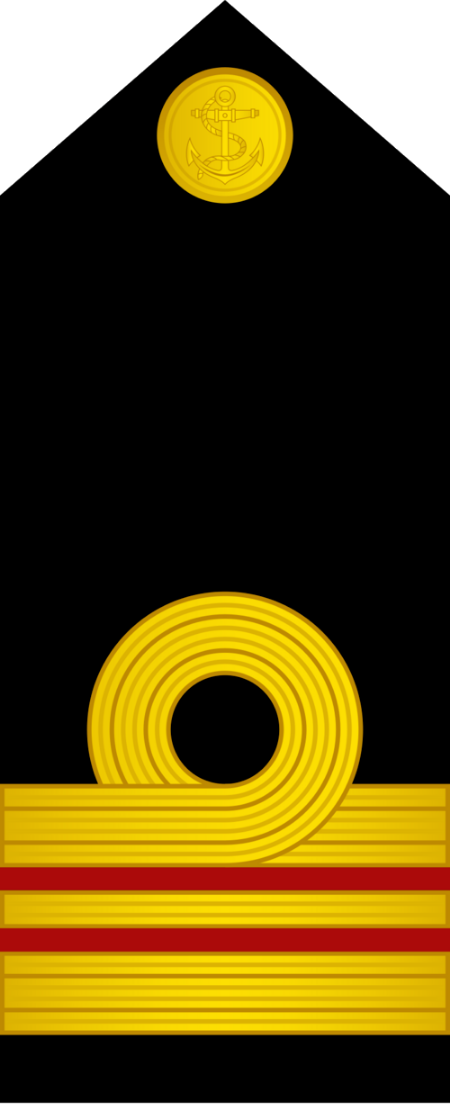
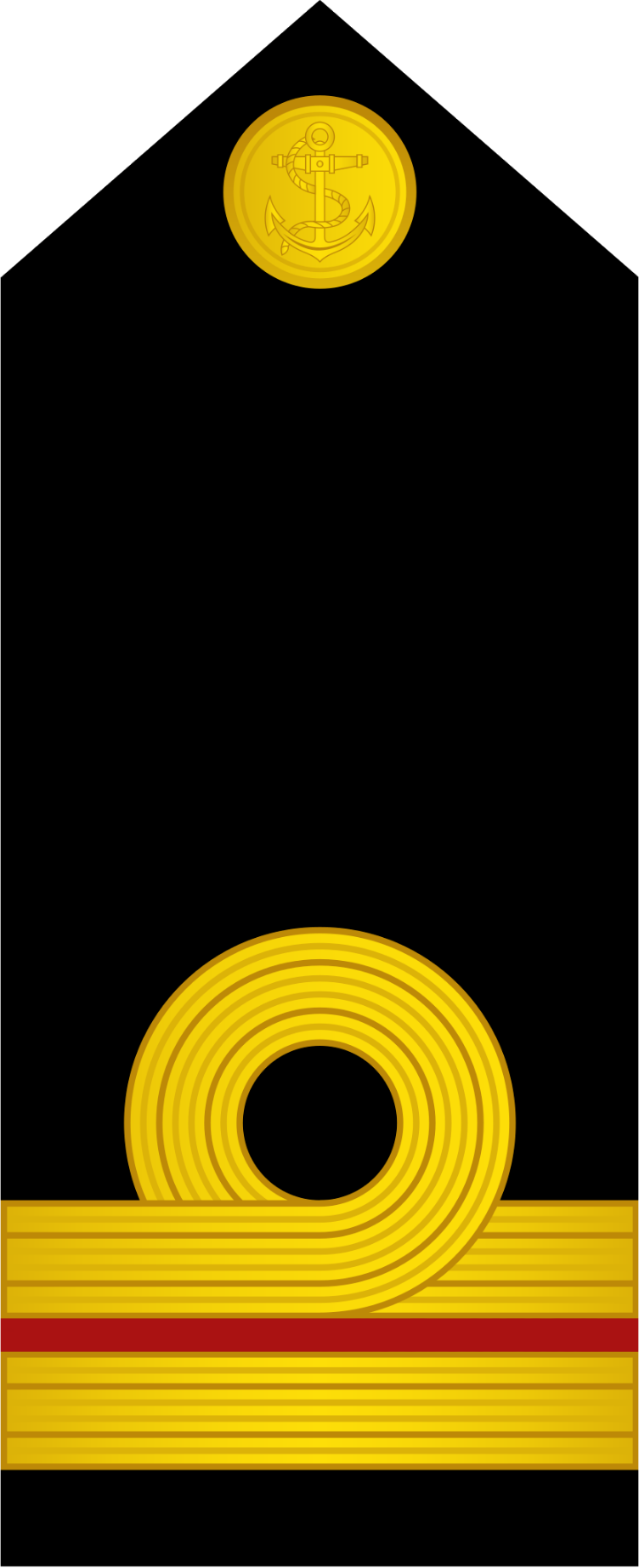
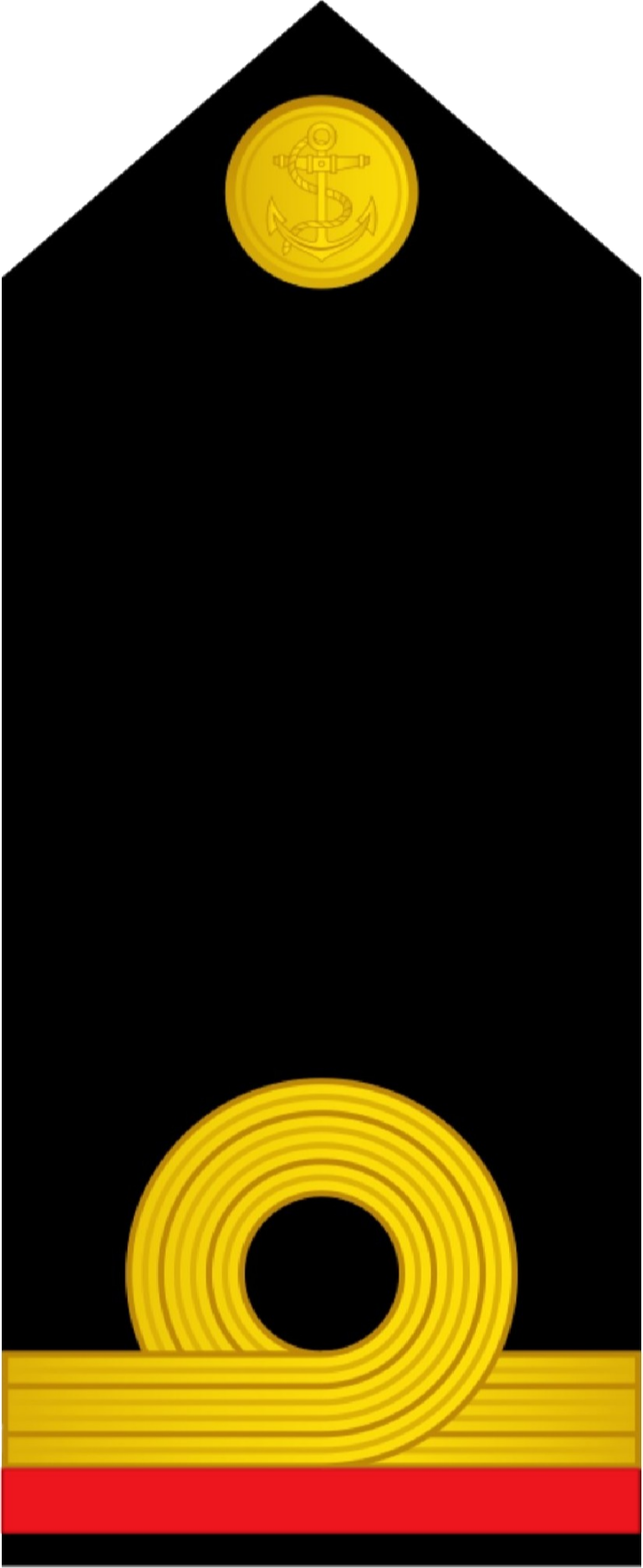
Rank group	General/flag officers				Senior officers			Junior officers
Pay level (7CPC)	18 (apex)	17/16/15	14	13A	13	12A	11	10B	10	Stipend
Indian Navy
Indian Navy	Admiral एडमिरल	Vice admiral वाइस एडमिरल	Rear admiral रियर एडमिरल	Commodore कमोडोर	Captain कैप्टन	Commander कमांडर	Lieutenant commander लेफ़्टिनेंट कमांडर	Lieutenant लेफ्टिनेंट	Sub-lieutenant सब लेफ्टिनेंट	Midshipman मिडशिपमैन
Indian Navy Medical Service										No insignia
Indian Navy Medical Service		Surgeon Vice admiral	Surgeon Rear admiral	Surgeon Commodore	Surgeon Captain	Surgeon Commander	Surgeon Lieutenant Commander	Surgeon Lieutenant	Surgeon Sub lieutenant

=== Command flags ===
Rank flags	Adm	VAdm	RAdm	Cmde
(1950–2022)
(2022–present)

The highest rank in the IN's CO cadre is Admiral, a four-star rank, which is held exclusively by the Chief of the Naval Staff (CNS). The rank was first awarded to then-Vice Admiral A. K. Chatterji in March 1968, following his appointment to the post of CNS; before him, CNS appointees belonged to the three-star rank of Vice Admiral. However, unlike the IA and the IAF, which both bear the honorary five-star ranks of Field Marshal (FM) and Marshal of the Indian Air Force (MIAF) respectively, the IN does not have a correspondingly recognized equivalent, as no four-star admirals were deemed for promotion to five-star rank.

=== Junior commissioned officer and non-commissioned ranks ===
Rank group	Subordinate Officers (SO)			Non commissioned officers (NCO)		Enlisted
Indian Navy						No insignia
Indian Navy	Master chief petty officer I मास्टर चीफ पेटी ऑफिसर फर्स्ट क्लास	Master chief petty officer II मास्टर चीफ पेटी ऑफिसर सेकेंड क्लास	Chief petty officer चीफ पेटी ऑफिसर	Petty officer पेटी ऑफिसर	Leading Seaman लीडिंग सीमैन	Seaman I सीमैन फर्स्ट क्लास	Seaman II सीमैन सेकंड क्लास

Junior Commissioned Officers (JCOs) in the Indian Navy are senior sailors promoted from the ranks of Non-Commissioned Officers (NCOs), based on merit, seniority, and vacancy availability. They hold a status broadly equivalent to Warrant Officers in the Royal Navy. Positioned between Commissioned Officers and NCOs, MCPO I and MCPO II are highly respected for their experience—typically over 20 years of service—and are often addressed as MaSabs across all ranks.

From 1950 to December 1968, the designation of Chief Petty Officer was the highest non-commissioned rank in IN's rank hierarchy. In December 1968, the designations of Master Chief Petty Officer I and Master Chief Petty Officer II were introduced.

== Rank descriptions ==
Indian Navy ranks are classified into three categories:

- Commissioned Officers – equivalent to All India Services and Group ‘A’ Gazetted officers.
- Junior Commissioned Officers (JCO) – equivalent to Group ‘B’ Gazetted officers.
- Other Ranks (OR) – comprising non-commissioned personnel, equivalent to Group ‘C’ non-gazetted staff.

=== Officer ranks ===
Rank	Epaulette Insignia	Description	Appointments	Superannuation Age/Tenure	Rank flag	Pay level
Admiral		Four-star rank; professional head of the Indian Armed Forces (when appointed), or commander of the Indian Navy	Chief of Defence Staff (CDS); Chief of the Naval Staff (CNS)	65 years (CDS); 62 years (CNS)		Level 18
Vice Admiral (C-in-C grade)		Three star rank; authority of naval commands	FOC-in-C of Eastern, Western and Southern Naval Commands, Vice Chief of Naval Staff, CINCAN, CinC SFC, CISC	60 years		Level 17
Vice Admiral		Three-star rank; operational authority	Deputy Chief of the Naval Staff, Chiefs of Personnel, Materiel, Controller of Warship Production&Acquisition, Director General Naval Operations, Commandants of major training institutions	60 years		Level 15
Rear Admiral		Two-star rank; commands a naval area or fleet	Flag Officers Commanding Fleets, Flag Officers Commanding Naval Areas, Commandant of training institutions, Superintendent of naval dockyards, Assistant Chiefs of the Naval Staff	58 years		Level 14
Commodore		One-star rank, senior-most sea command	Fleet CO, Naval Attaché, Senior Staff in Naval HQ, CO Naval air base, Principal Director at Naval HQ	56 years (58 years for Commodore [Education])		Level 13A
Captain		Commands large warships, naval air squadrons, or shore establishments	Commanding Officer, Director/Joint Director in Naval HQ, Principal Engineer/Technical officer, Senior staff officer	56 years (Timescale Captain) (58 years for Captain [Education]) (Voluntary retirement after 5 years of service as Selected Captain)	—N/a	Level 13
Commander		Senior officer rank, often second-in-command of warships, Commanding Officer of small ships or naval air squadrons	Executive Officer, Senior Engineer, Staff Officer, Senior Technical officer	54 years	—N/a	Level 12A
Lieutenant Commander		Mid-ranking officer responsible for departments on board	Departmental Head, Senior Divisional Officer, Assistant Engineer, Technical officer	52 years	—N/a	Level 11
Lieutenant		Junior officer rank; takes on division and technical duties	Junior executive Officer, OOD, Divisional Officer, Pilot, Assistant technical officer, ATC officer	52 years	—N/a	Level 10B
Sub-Lieutenant		First commissioned rank in the Indian Navy	Pilot, Watchkeeping Officer, Divisional Officer, Junior technical Officer, Observer, ATC officer	52 years	—N/a	Level 10
Midshipman		Trainee officer undergoing Naval Orientation Course	Under training at Indian Naval Academy, Air Force Academy (Pilots)	1.5 to 4.5 years of training	—N/a	Stipend (₹673,200 (US$7,000)) pa

=== Indian Navy Medical Service ===
Medical officer ranks
Rank	Epaulette Insignia	Description	Appointments	Superannuation Age/Tenure	Rank flag	Pay level
Surgeon Vice Admiral (DGAFMS)		Senior-most officer of AFMS; tri-service head	Director General Armed Forces Medical Services	62 years (fixed tenure)		Level 17 (Apex)
Surgeon Vice Admiral		Principal Medical Officer at Naval HQ or Command HQ	Director General Medical Services (Navy), Senior Consultant (Navy)	62 years		Level 16
Surgeon Rear Admiral		Senior specialist and administrative posts at Command HQ / Hospitals	Command Medical Officer, Command Hospital Director	61 years		Level 14
Surgeon Commodore		Senior consultant and hospital administration	CO of large military hospitals, senior advisor	59 years		Level 13A
Surgeon Captain		Specialist with independent responsibilities	Senior Advisor, Principal Medical Officer (Fleet/Establishment)	58 years	—N/a	Level 13
Surgeon Commander		Mid-level medical specialist or administrator	Classified Specialist, Medical Officer-in-Charge	58 years	—N/a	Level 12A
Surgeon Lieutenant Commander		Junior specialist or general duty medical officer	Senior Medical Officer, Station Health Officer	58 years	—N/a	Level 11
Surgeon Lieutenant		Entry-level officer, general medical duties	Medical Officer at ships/establishments	58 years	—N/a	Level 10B
Surgeon Sub Lieutenant		Undergoing internship at Naval Hospitals under AFMC MBBS course	Medical intern	1 year of internship	—N/a	Level 10

=== Subordinate officers (SO) ===
Rank	Insignia	Description	Appointments/Specialisations	Superannuation Age/Tenure	Pay level
Navy Master Chief Petty Officer/ MCERA I	& aiguillettes presented by the CNS	Honorary appointment, highest achievable enlisted rank in the Indian Navy	Principal advisor to CNS on sailor affairs; ceremonial & consultative role & In charge of Engine Room and propulsion systems	57 years (extendable)	Level 9
Master Chief Petty Officer Class I/ MCERA I		Senior JCO-equivalent; assists ship COs in administration and discipline	Base Master-at-Arms, Fleet-level Chief ERA	57 years	Level 8
Master Chief Petty Officer Class II/ MCERA II		Mid level JCO-equivalent; supervises divisions, handles men and machines	Chief ERA, Department 2IC in base/ship	57 years	Level 7
Chief Petty Officer/ ERA III		Junior JCO-equivalent; trained in marine engineering duties	Section-in-charge, Technical supervisor, ERA (Chief Artificer)	52 years	Level 6

=== Non-commissioned officers (NCO) ===
Rank	Insignia	Description	Appointments/Specialisations	Superannuation Age/Tenure	Pay level
Petty Officer/ ERA IV		Senior NCO; supervises divisions or equipment sections	Petty Artificer, section-in-charge, instructor roles	52 years	Level 5
Leading Seaman/ ERA V		First NCO rank; commands a small team or assists Petty Officers	L/ERA, radar ops, communications, weapons handling	52 years	Level 4

=== Enlisted and trainees ===
Rank	Insignia	Description	Appointments/Specialisations	Superannuation Age/Tenure	Pay level
Seaman I	No insignia	Promoted sailor after completing initial training & assessments	Operational duties: navigation, gunnery, ER assistant	52 years	Level 3
Seaman II	No insignia	Freshly inducted sailor post-basic training; under probation	General duties, sentry, deck jobs, mess duty	52 years	Level 3
Artificer Apprentice		Technical trade recruits undergoing training to become ERAs i.e., Leading Seaman	Undergoing training in INS Shivaji or Naval Technical Institutes	2.5 to 3 years	Stipend (₹175,200 (US$1,800)) pa

== Specialisation Badges ==
S.No.	Badge	Description	Role	Specialisation allowance(s)
1		Torpedo & Anti-Submarine badge	Specialist in submarine detection, torpedo operations, and anti-submarine tactics.	₹10,500 (US$110) or ₹15,750 (US$160) per month for officers; ₹5,300 (US$55) or ₹10,500 (US$110) per month for sailors
2		Pilot badge	Naval aviator operating fighter jets, helicopters, and maritime reconnaissance aircraft.	₹25,000 (US$260) per month for naval aviators (officers)
3		Aviation badge	Support staff and technicians maintaining naval aircraft systems and operations.	₹3,600 (US$37) per month for artificers
4		Flight engineer badge	In-flight technical expert responsible for engine, fuel, and system monitoring during operations.	₹10,500 (US$110) per month for naval flight engineers
5		SAR Aircrewman badge	Search and Rescue (SAR) specialist performing recovery operations at sea.	₹10,500 (US$110) per month for naval officers (Aircrewmen); ₹5,300 (US$55) per month for naval sailors (Aircrewmen)
6		Naval aviation specialization badge	Aviation support specialist engaged in technical operations and navigation support.	₹10,500 (US$110) per month for officers
7		Naval Paratrooper badge	Specialist trained in combat parachuting for airborne naval operations.	₹10,500 (US$110) per month for officers; ₹5,300 (US$55) per month for sailors
8		Combat Diver badge (officers and MCPOs)	Underwater operations, sabotage, reconnaissance, and mine clearance.	₹10,500 (US$110) per month for officers
9		Combat Diver badge (sailors)	Tactical diver specializing in demolitions and underwater combat.	₹5,300 (US$55) per month for sailors
10		Gunner badge	Naval artillery operator responsible for deck guns and close-range weapons.	₹1,600 (US$17) per month for sailors (Y)
11		Communication badge	Radio, cryptography, and secure naval communications expert.	₹3,600 (US$37) per month for sailors (X); ₹1,600 (US$17) per month for sailors (Y)
12		Survey Recorder badge	Specialist in hydrographic surveys, navigation chart preparation, and mapping.	₹3,600 (US$37) per month for sailors (X); ₹1,600 (US$17) per month for sailors (Y)
13		Shooting badge	Marksmanship and small arms expert maintaining shooting proficiency.	₹1,600 (US$17) per month for sailors (Y)
14		Radar Plotter badge	Radar operator for navigation, surveillance, and tracking hostile vessels.	₹3,600 (US$37) per month for sailors (X); ₹1,600 (US$17) per month for sailors (Y)
15		Engine Room badge	Specialist in propulsion systems, machinery maintenance, and engine control.	₹3,600 (US$37) per month for artificers, in addition to artificer allowance
16		Physical Trainer badge	Physical fitness trainer maintaining operational readiness of naval personnel.	₹3,600 (US$37) per month for officers; ₹2,700 (US$28) per month for sailors
17		Medical officer badge	Naval doctor or a Flight surgeon providing healthcare and emergency response aboard ships, submarines or aircraft.	20% of basic pay for officers as Non-practising Allowance (NPA); ₹11,220 (US$120) to ₹40,000 (US$420) per month for medical officers
18		Submariner's badge (officers and MCPOs)	Officer trained for submarine operations, stealth missions, and deep-sea warfare.	₹20,000 (US$210) per month for officers
19		Submariner's badge (CPOs and junior enlisted)	Enlisted crew managing submarine maintenance, weapons, and operational support.	₹10,500 (US$110) per month for sailors
20		MARCOS badge (special forces)	Elite commando involved in counter-terrorism, direct action, and special operations.	₹25,000 (US$260) per month
21		Surface warfare officers badge	Officers trained for surface ship combat operations and fleet tactics.	₹10,500 (US$110) per month for officers
22		Surface warfare enlisted badge	Sailors trained for surface ship combat operations, maintenance and logistics.	₹5,300 (US$55) per month for sailors
23		Naval Police badge	Law enforcement aboard ships and naval bases; discipline and security specialist.	₹1,600 (US$17) per month for sailors (Y)
24		Naval Observer (Navigator) badge	Officers trained for airborne surveillance, reconnaissance, navigation, maritime patrol and anti-submarine warfare (air).	₹10,500 (US$110) per month for qualified naval navigators

== Historical ranks ==
Rank group	General / flag officers				Senior officers			Junior officers
Indian Navy (–2023)
Indian Navy (–2023)	Admiral एडमिरल	Vice admiral वाइस एडमिरल	Rear admiral रियर एडमिरल	Commodore कमोडोर	Captain कैप्टन	Commander कमांडर	Lieutenant commander लेफ़्टिनेंट कमांडर	Lieutenant लेफ्टिनेंट	Sub-lieutenant सब लेफ्टिनेंट	Midshipman मिडशिपमैन

== See also ==
- Comparative military ranks
- All India Services
- Indian Army ranks and insignia
- Indian Air Force ranks and insignia
- Coast Guard ranks and insignia of India
- Border Roads Organisation ranks and insignia of India
- Paramilitary forces ranks and insignia of India
- Police ranks and insignia of India
