= Pratap Chandra Lal =

Indian Air Force Chief of Air Staff

Air Chief Marshal Pratap Chandra Lal DFC
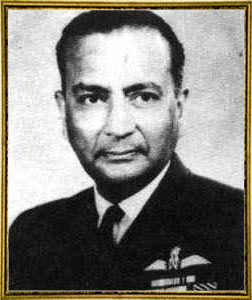
- Air Chief Marshal PC Lal

7th Chief of the Air Staff
- In office 16 July 1969 – 15 January 1973
- President: V. V. Giri
- Prime Minister: Indira Gandhi
- Preceded by: Arjan Singh
- Succeeded by: Om Prakash Mehra

3rd Vice Chief of the Air Staff
- In office 1 October 1964 – 1 September 1966
- Preceded by: Arjan Singh
- Succeeded by: Ramaswamy Rajaram

2nd Air Officer Commanding-in-Chief Western Air Command
- In office 24 November 1963 – 30 September 1964
- Preceded by: Erlic Pinto
- Succeeded by: Ramaswamy Rajaram

3rd Air Officer Commanding-in-Chief Training Command
- In office 11 January 1956 – 19 November 1957
- Preceded by: S N Goyal
- Succeeded by: Kanwar Jaswant Singh

Personal details
- Born: 6 December 1916 Ludhiana, Punjab Province, British India
- Died: 13 August 1982 (aged 65) London, England
- Awards: Padma Vibhushan; Padma Bhushan; Distinguished Flying Cross

Military service
- Allegiance: British India (1939–1947); India (1947–1973)
- Branch/service: Royal Indian Air Force; Indian Air Force
- Years of service: 1939-1973
- Rank: Air Chief Marshal
- Commands: Western Air Command; Training Command; No. 7 Squadron
- Battles/wars: World War II; Indo-Pakistani War (1965); Indo-Pakistani War (1971)

Air Chief Marshal Pratap Chandra Lal, DFC (6 December 1916 – 13 August 1982) was the Chief of Air Staff (CAS) of the Indian Air Force (IAF) during the Indo-Pakistani War of 1971. He served in the IAF from 1939 until his retirement in 1973. He was the CAS at the time of Operation Chengiz Khan, the preemptive strikes that were carried out by the Pakistan Air Force (PAF) that marked the formal initiation of hostilities of the war.

Slated to study law in England, Lal instead joined the Air Force Volunteer Reserve at the outbreak of World War II. After serving as a navigation instructor, he trained as a pilot and joined No. 7 Squadron IAF. He later commanded this squadron during the Burma Campaign and mentioned in dispatches as well as being awarded the Distinguished Flying Cross. In 1945, he was absorbed into the permanent cadre of the Indian Air Force. After the Partition of India in 1947, he served as the Director of Planning and Training at Air HQ. In 1949, he attended the RAF Staff College, Andover. He led the Air Force team which brought King Tribhuvan to safety in 1950. Lal served as the Military Secretary to the Cabinet from 1953 to 1956 in the rank of air commodore. He became the first Indian to break the sound barrier, in 1954.

After commanding Training Command, he was deputed to the Indian Airlines Corporation for five years. He also served as the general manager of Indian Airlines Corporation from 1957 to 1962. During this time, he fell out of favour with Minister of Defence V. K. Krishna Menon, and his services were terminated in 1962. With the outbreak of the Sino-Indian War, he was re-instated and took over as Air Officer Maintenance at Air HQ. After a short stint heading Western Air Command, he served as the Vice Chief of the Air Staff during the Indo-Pakistani War of 1965. From 1966 to 1969, Lal served as the managing director and later chairman of Hindustan Aeronautics Limited.

Lal took over as the seventh Chief of the Air Staff in 1969. Under his command, the IAF scored a decisive victory against Pakistan in the Indo-Pakistani War of 1971, which led to the creation of Bangladesh in December 1971. He was awarded the Padma Vibhushan and the Padma Bhushan, the second and third highest civilian awards of India. After retiring from the IAF, Lal served as the chairman and managing director of Indian Airlines and later chairman of Air India.

== Early life and education ==
Lal was born on 6 December 1916 in Ludhiana. He attended the Modern School and the Bishop Cotton School, Shimla. Having qualified for a diploma in journalism at King's College, London in 1938, Lal expected to return to full-time study of law at the Inns of Court in the fall of 1939. With the outbreak of World War II, his plans were shelved.

Since he held a civilian pilot license, Lal was invited to join the Air Force Volunteer reserve. After appearing before the Selection Board at Safdarjung, Lal arrived at the Air Force Station Risalpur (now Pakistan Air Force Academy). Since there was a shortage of navigators, Lal was recruited as a navigator to begin with and would be trained as a pilot later.

== Military career ==
=== World War II ===
Lal was commissioned in November 1939 as a pilot officer and posted to Karachi as an observer. He was later posted back to Risalpur as a navigation instructor. After a short stint at the Coastal Defence Flight in Calcutta, Lal was posted as a navigation instructor at No. 1 Flying Training School at Ambala. It was here that he was also trained as a pilot. He flew the Hawker Audax and the Hawker Hart.

In 1943, Flight Lieutenant Lal joined, as a combat pilot, No. 7 Squadron, commanded by Squadron Leader Hem Chaudhuri. The squadron was equipped with Vultee A-31 Vengeance dive bombers and supported the Chindits. The squadron also helped in relieving the Siege of Imphal.

In June 1944, Lal was promoted to the acting rank of squadron leader and took command of No. 7 Squadron. Under him, the squadron converted to fighters. From early 1944 to March 1945, the squadron was very active in the Burma Campaign. He led the squadron in a tactical reconnaissance role in support of the XIV Army, from North Burma all the way till Rangoon. He was mentioned in dispatches in December 1944. In October 1945, Lal was awarded the Distinguished Flying Cross (DFC).

The citation for his DFC reads as follows:

CITATION
Acting Squadron Leader Pratap Chandra Lal
(IND.1567), 7 (RIAF) Squadron

Sqn Ldr Lal has completed a considerable number of operational sorties, He is the Commanding Officer of a squadron which has been employed on photographic reconnaissance in support of the Fourteenth Army in the Irrawaddy Valley. He has shown exceptional qualities and keenness and has completed many hazardous sorties in the wake of strong enemy opposition. He has frequently penetrated deep into enemy territory in search of important information. By his coolness and determination, Sqn Ldr Lal has set a fine example to all his pilots.

After the war, Lal was absorbed into the permanent cadre of the IAF. He moved to the Manning department at Air Headquarters. In August 1946, he took over the inter-service recruiting centre at Calcutta. He was sent for a senior commanders' course to the United Kingdom in December 1946.

=== Post-Independence ===
On 15 August 1947, with the Partition of India, a new Air Headquarters of the Dominion of India was formed. Lal was appointed the Director of Planning and Training at Air HQ. In November 1947, he was promoted to the acting rank of group captain. Realising that the planning and training were vast responsibilities, it was divided into two departments. In late 1948, Group Captain Arjan Singh took over as Director of Training, while Lal continued as Director of Planning.

Along with Group Captain Minoo Merwan Engineer, Lal embarked for United Kingdom, having been selected to attend the RAF Staff College, Andover in May 1949. After completing the year-long course, he returned to India and was appointed Senior Air Staff Officer of No. 1 Operational Command (later Western Air Command), serving in that capacity for three years.

In November 1950, there were tensions in the Kingdom of Nepal. King Tribhuvan faced a coup d'état from the Rana dynasty. He took refuge in the Indian embassy. With two Dakota aircraft, Lal led the Indian Air Force team that brought the king to safety in New Delhi. In January 1953, he was promoted to the acting rank of air commodore and posted to the Cabinet Secretariat as deputy secretary (military). He led a team of three in October 1954, consisting of Group Captain (later Air Chief Marshal) Hrushikesh Moolgavkar and Flight Lieutenant (later air commodore) Roshan Lal Suri, to Europe to select new aircraft for the IAF. The team rejected the Supermarine Swift and chose the Folland Gnat, a decision which would serve India and the IAF well during the Indo-Pakistani War of 1965. During this tour, he became the first Indian to break the sound barrier. After a three-year stint at the Cabinet Secretariat, he took over as the air officer commanding Training Command in Bangalore.

=== Indian Airlines Corporation ===
In November 1957, Lal's services were loaned to the Indian Airlines Corporation (IAC) for five years. He took over as the general manager of IAC. He simultaneously served as a member of the board of directors of IAC and Air India. The IAC fleet was modernised and the company showed its first profits during his tenure. During this time, the IAF and the IAC were looking for a replacement for the Dakotas. The three aircraft in the fray were the Hawker Siddeley HS 748, the Fokker F27 Friendship and the Lockheed CL-49. The minister of defence, V. K. Krishna Menon, wanted the HS 748 while Lal had his doubts. Eventually, Krishna Menon had his way and the HS 748 was selected to be manufactured in India. In November 1959, Lal was promoted to the acting rank of air vice marshal.

In November 1960, Air India inaugurated its service to Tokyo, Japan. Lal and Air Marshal Subroto Mukerjee, then Chief the Air Staff (CAS) were passengers on this flight. After landing in Tokyo, on 8 November 1960, Mukerjee was having a meal in a restaurant with a friend, an officer in the Indian Navy. A piece of food got lodged in his windpipe, choking him to death. Before a doctor was called for and could attend, Mukerjee had died. The next day, Lal came back with Mukerjee's body to Palam Airport, New Delhi.

The falling out with Menon led to Lal being informed that his services were no longer required by the IAF at the end of his term with IAC in September 1962. His services were not required by the Ministry of Civil Aviation either. The prime minister, Jawaharlal Nehru, offered him a job in a public sector steel mill but Lal refused. On 30 September 1962, he was paid out provident fund, pension and gratuity and left the service.

=== Return to IAF ===
In October 1962, the Sino-Indian War broke out and with the defeat came Menon's resignation on 31 October. Lal was re-instated in service in December as Air Officer Maintenance at Air Headquarters. After about a year as AOM, he was appointed Air Officer Commanding-in-Chief Western Air Command which was recently upgraded to a full-fledged command. Lal then took over as the Vice Chief of the Air Staff (VCAS) in from Air Marshal Arjan Singh who assumed office as the Chief of the Air Staff.

During the Indo-Pakistani War of 1965, Lal served as the VCAS. For distinguished service of a high order during the war, he was awarded the Padma Bhushan. On 15 January 1966, in recognition of the contribution of the IAF, the post of the CAS was upgraded to the rank of Air Chief Marshal and that of the VCAS to the rank of Air Marshal. Lal was promoted to the acting rank of air marshal, the first VCAS to hold the rank.

=== Hindustan Aeronautics Limited ===
In September 1966, Lal was deputed to the Hindustan Aeronautics Limited (HAL) and took over as the managing director. He brought about many innovations at HAL. He brought in a management specialist from the Indian Institute of Management Ahmedabad to take a fresh look at problems. A management information system was introduced for the first time. To improve productivity and lower costs, a production planning and control system was introduced. Under Lal, corporate policies regarding multiple aspects of human resource management were framed. He was instrumental in the establishment of the production lines for the new Mikoyan-Gurevich MiG-21 and Folland Gnat fighters, and HS 748 transport aircraft.

=== Chief of Air Staff ===
On 16 July 1969, Lal was promoted to the rank of air chief marshal, the fourth Indian officer to hold the rank, and assumed the office of Chief of the Air Staff.

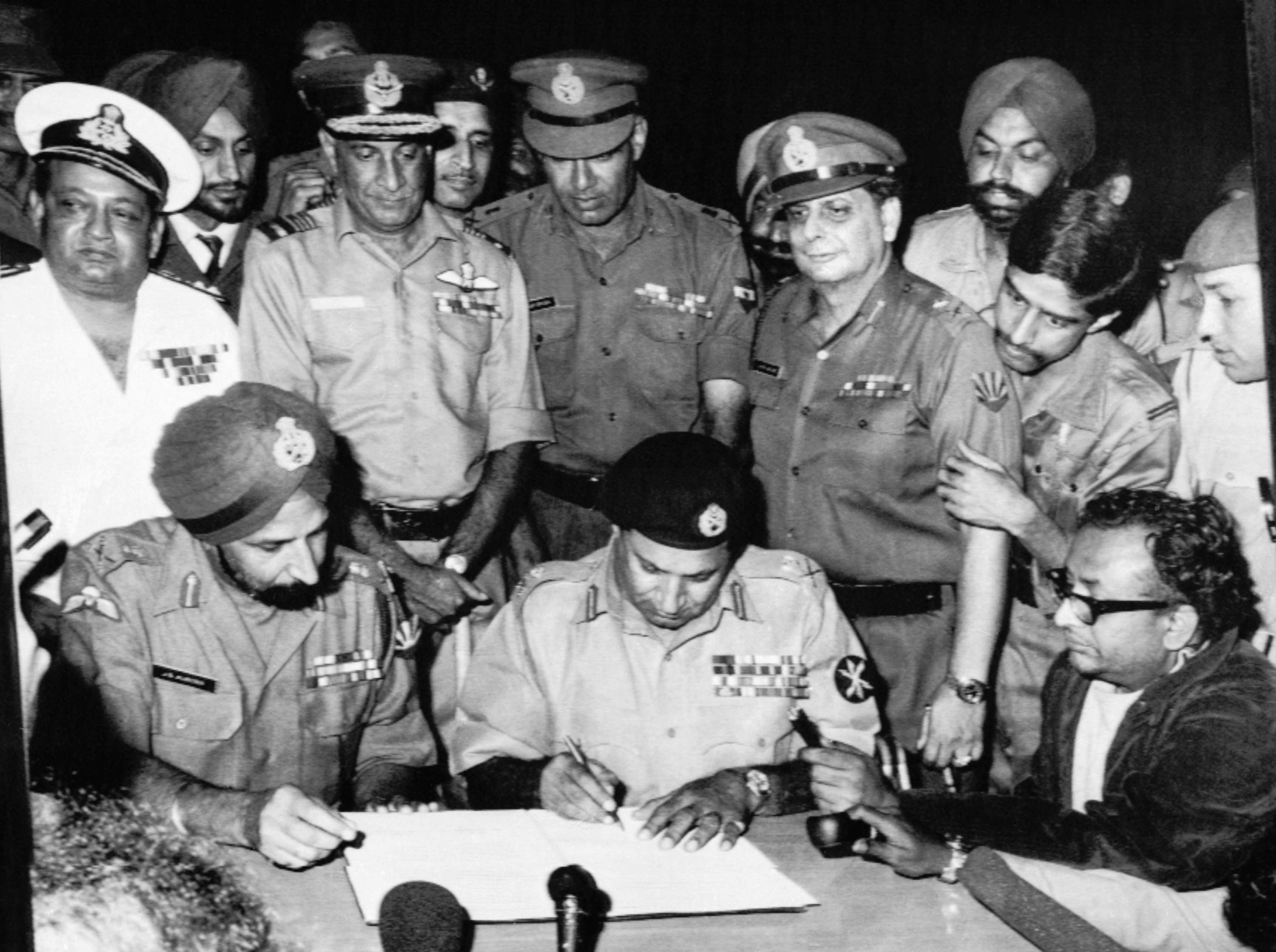
The Instrument of Surrender being signed on 16 December 1971.

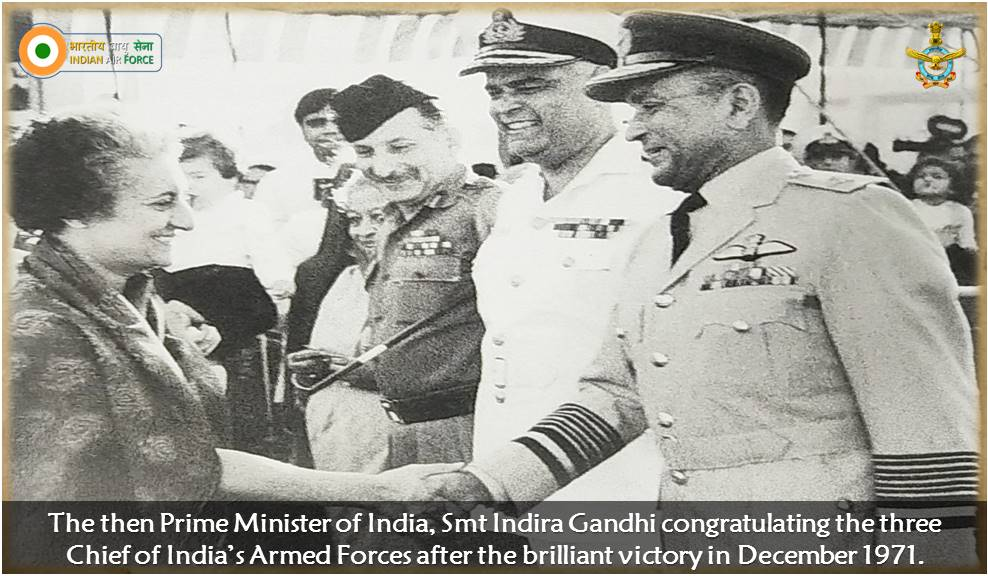
Prime Minister Indira Gandhi congratulating the chiefs of the three services, General Sam Manekshaw, Admiral SM Nanda and Air Chief Marshal PC Lal.

==== Indo-Pakistani War of 1971 ====
The Indo-Pakistani War of 1971 was sparked by the Bangladesh Liberation War, a conflict between the traditionally dominant West Pakistanis and the majority East Pakistanis. In 1970, East Pakistanis demanded autonomy for the state, but the Pakistani government failed to satisfy these demands and, in early 1971, a demand for secession took root in East Pakistan. In March, the Pakistan Armed Forces launched a fierce campaign to curb the secessionists, the latter including soldiers and police from East Pakistan. Thousands of East Pakistanis died, and nearly ten million refugees fled to West Bengal, a neighbouring Indian state. In April, India decided to assist in the formation of the new nation of Bangladesh.

The war started on 3 December 1971 with Operation Chengiz Khan. Aircraft of the Pakistan Air Force (PAF) mounted simultaneous attacks on seven IAF bases – Srinagar, Awantipur, Pathankot, Uttarlai, Jodhpur, Ambala and Agra. A radar station on the border was also hit. The IAF struck back. By 21:00hrs, the Canberras of the No. 35 Squadron and No. 106 Squadron, as well as No. 5 and No. 16 Squadrons, were armed for a foray deep into Pakistan. These flew against eight Western Pakistani airbases: Murid, Mianwali, Sargodha, Chandhar, Risalewala, Rafiqui, and Masroor. In total, 23 combat sorties were launched that night, inflicting heavy damage on Sargodha and Masroor airbases. The PAF units stationed on these airfields had to operate from taxiways for the following two days. Through the night the Indian Air Force also struck the main East Pakistani airfields of Tejgaon, and later Kurmitola. At the same time, the Indian Air Force was deploying additional aircraft to its forward airfields for strikes that were to follow the next morning. Within days, India achieved air superiority.

Lal ensured that the Indian Army and the IAF worked closely with each other. The advance HQs of Western Air Command and Eastern Air Command were alongside their respective army commands. The advance HQs, under an air commodore, were responsible for providing support to the Army as required. Each corps HQ under the commands had a tactical air centre, commanded by a group captain, who reported to the advance HQ. In the field, forward air controllers were responsible for directing strikes called out in the support of the Army.

The war lasted less than a fortnight and saw more than 90,000 Pakistani soldiers taken prisoner. It ended with the unconditional surrender of Pakistan's eastern half and resulted in the birth of Bangladesh as a new nation. The IAF flew over 7300 sorties in 14 days, an average of about 500 sorties per day. About 86 PAF aircraft were downed, at the cost of 42 IAF aircraft.

For his services to the nation, Lal was awarded the Padma Vibhushan in January 1972. Lal retired from service on 16 January 1973 after serving for over 33 years. He handed over charge to Air Chief Marshal Om Prakash Mehra.

== Post-retirement ==
In April 1973, Lal was appointed full-time chairman and managing director (CMD) of the Indian Airlines Corporation (IAC). With the IAC increasing in magnitude and complexity, a need for appointing a full-time CMD was felt. Lal was also a part of the 21-member apex body constituted by the Ministry of Labour to delve into the problems of industrial relations for industries in the private sector. In August 1976, he was removed from the chairmanship after a falling out with Sanjay Gandhi. With the new government being formed in March 1977, Lal was appointed part-time Chairman of Indian Airlines in July. Lal also served as the chairman of the Indian Tube Company, a part of the Tata Group.

In February 1978, J. R. D. Tata, the founder and long-time chairman of Air India was unceremoniously dropped from the board by Prime Minister Morarji Desai. Lal, who was the chairman of Indian Airlines was appointed chairman of Air India as well. Two senior executives, Managing Director K G Appusamy and Deputy Managing Director Nari Dastur, resigned in protest.

== Death and legacy ==
Lal died of a heart attack while visiting London on 13 August 1982. His body was brought back on an Air India flight. He was cremated with full military honours. Among the pall bearers were the former chief ACM, Arjan Singh, and the serving chief, ACM Dilbagh Singh. Wreaths were laid by the Minister of Defence R Venkataraman and the chiefs of the three service – COAS General K. V. Krishna Rao, CNS Admiral Oscar Stanley Dawson and CAS ACM Dilbagh Singh

Lal was working on his memoirs and the history of the IAF when he died. His wife, Ela Lal edited and completed the book and My years with the IAF was published in 1986.

The Indian Air Force won its most decisive victory under the leadership of Lal. He was regarded as an exemplary aviator and administrator. Unlike earlier Chiefs, he was not a fighter jock, but an instructor and manager. The Air Force organises an annual 'Air Chief Marshal P C Lal Memorial lecture'.

== Awards and decorations ==

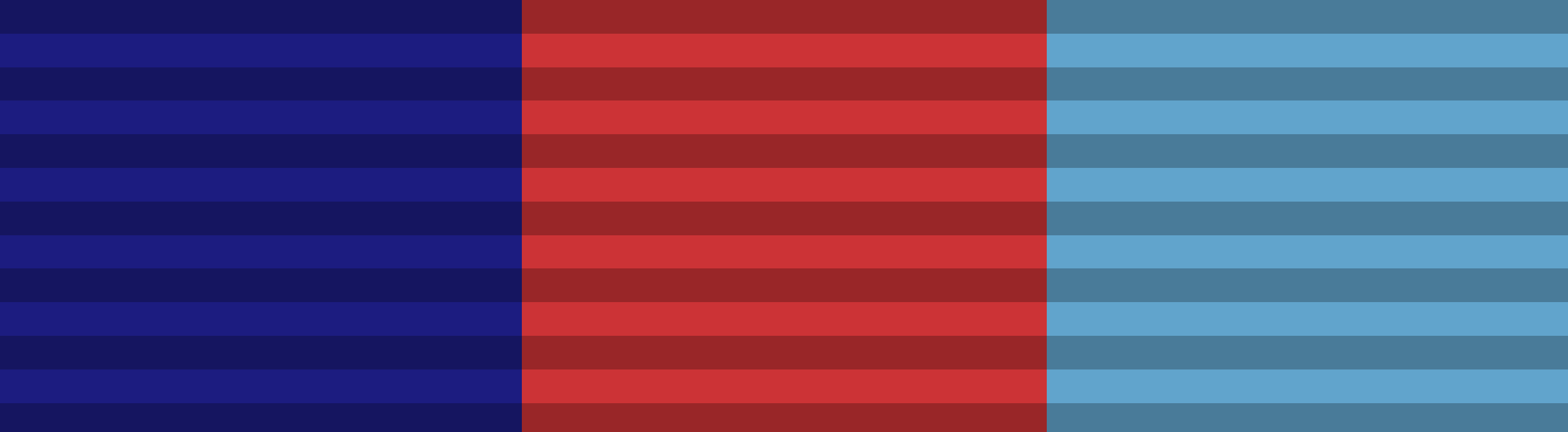

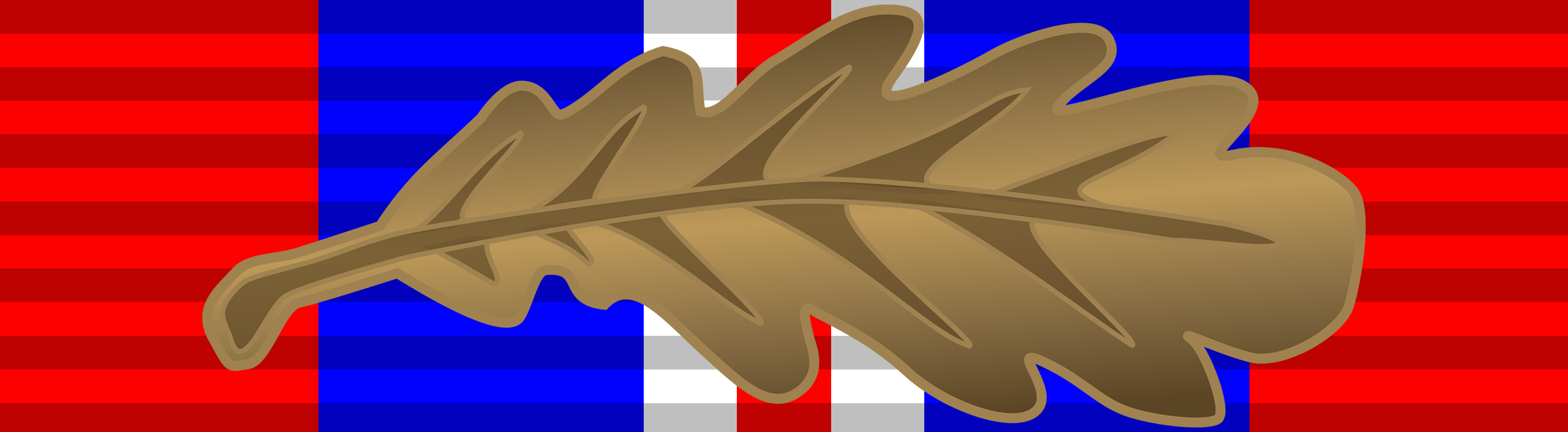

	Padma Vibhushan	Padma Bhushan	
Samar Seva Star	Poorvi Star		Paschimi Star
Raksha Medal	Sangram Medal	Sainya Seva Medal	Indian Independence Medal
25th Independence Anniversary Medal	20 Years Long Service Medal	9 Years Long Service Medal	Distinguished Flying Cross
1939–45 Star	Burma Star	War Medal 1939-1945 (with MID oak leaf)	India Service Medal

== Dates of rank ==
Insignia	Rank	Component	Date of rank
	Pilot Officer	Royal Indian Air Force	14 November 1939
	Flying Officer	Royal Indian Air Force	14 May 1941
	Flight Lieutenant	Royal Indian Air Force	15 May 1942 (acting); 21 September 1944 (substantive)
	Squadron Leader	Royal Indian Air Force	1 October 1944 (acting); 1 November 1946 (substantive)
	Wing Commander	Indian Air Force	15 August 1948
	Group Captain	Indian Air Force	4 November 1947 (acting)
	Group Captain	Indian Air Force	26 January 1950 (recommissioning and change in insignia); 15 September 1952 (substantive)
	Air Commodore	Indian Air Force	28 January 1953 (acting); 1 October 1958 (substantive)
	Air Vice Marshal	Indian Air Force	14 November 1959 (acting); 1 October 1961 (substantive)
	Air Marshal	Indian Air Force	15 January 1966
	Air Chief Marshal (CAS)	Indian Air Force	16 July 1969

== See also ==
- Field Marshal Sam Manekshaw
- Admiral Sardarilal Mathradas Nanda

== Bibliography ==
- Lal, P.C. (1986), My years with the IAF, Lancer Publishers, ISBN 8170620082
- Wadhwaney, Kishin (2004), Indian Airports (Shocking Ground Realities), Ajanta Publications, ISBN 978-8120205932
- Lala, R.M. (1993), Beyond the Last Blue Mountain, Penguin Books Ltd., ISBN 9780140169010
- Singh, Vijay Kumar (2005), Leadership in the Indian Army: Biographies of Twelve Soldiers, SAGE Publications, ISBN 978-0-7619-3322-9

Military offices
Preceded by Arjan Singh	Chief of the Air Staff (India); 1969–1973	Succeeded by Om Prakash Mehra
Preceded by Arjan Singh	Vice Chief of the Air Staff (India); 1964–1966	Succeeded by Ramaswamy Rajaram
Preceded by Erlic Pinto	Air Officer Commanding-in-Chief Western Air Command; 1963–1964	Succeeded by Ramaswamy Rajaram
Preceded by S N Goyal	Air Officer Commanding Training Command; 1956–1957	Succeeded by K. Jaswant-Singh
Preceded by Aizad Baksh Awan	Commanding officer No. 7 Squadron IAF; 1944–1945	Succeeded by Hari Chand Dewan
