= Ramaswamy Rajaram =

Indian air marshal (1917–1969)

Air Marshal Ramaswami Rajaram DFC
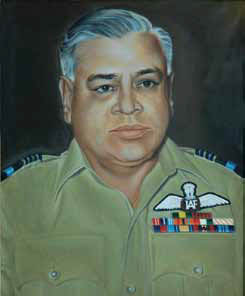
- Military career
- Allegiance: British India (1941–1947); India (from 1947)
- Branch: Royal Indian Air Force (1941-1947); Indian Air Force
- Service years: 1 Apr 1941 – 18 Jun 1969
- Rank: Air Marshal
- Commands: Western Air Command; Eastern Air Command; No.1 Operational Group; Tambaram Air Force Station; 3 Wing; No 1 Squadron
- Awards: Padma Bhushan; Distinguished Flying Cross

Air Marshal Ramaswamy Rajaram, DFC (1917–1969) was a senior officer in the Indian Air Force. He died in harness while serving as the vice chief of air staff (VCAS) of the Indian Air Force. He was the air officer commanding-in-chief Western Air Command during the Indo-Pakistani War of 1965.

== Early life and education ==
Rajaram was born to B S Ramaswamy Iyer, a Superintending Engineer with the Public Works Department (PWD) in Madurai in the Madras Presidency in 1917. He joined the Madras Flying Club and received his flying license in 1935. He attended the Presidency College, Chennai. He then joined the Madras Law College in 1938. With the outbreak of World War II, civilian pilots were invited to join the Indian Air Force Volunteer Reverse.

== Military career ==
=== World War II ===
His former Squadron Commander, MIAF Arjan Singh, about Rajaram.

"Rajaram was a very calm and humane person, with an incisive brain and a tremendous sense of humour. Extremely loyal and devoted to the service, he had a knack of getting on with all kinds of people, whatever their status in life. He was my troubleshooter."

—

Rajaram was commissioned on 20 November 1939 and posted to the Coastal Defence Flight at Madras. He was then posted to the No. 4 Flight at Karachi and then to the No. 1 Flying Training School at Ambala. By 1942, now Flying Officer Rajaram underwent specialised training in fighter reconnaissance and converted to the Hawker Hurricane aircraft. He served with the No. 6 Squadron IAF commanded by Squadron Leader Mehar Singh and then with the No. 1 Squadron IAF, commanded by Squadron Leader Arjan Singh, as the Flight commander. The squadron was inducted into the war and moved to Imphal.

In December 1944, now Squadron Leader Rajaram took over command of the No. 1 Squadron IAF from Squadron Leader Arjan Singh. The squadron operated in the Burma campaign for the remainder of the war. In April 1945, Rajaram was awarded the Distinguished Flying Cross. Promoted to wing commander, Rajaram served at the Air Force Station Kohat (now PAF Base Kohat).

=== Post-Independence ===
In 1950, he was promoted group captain and took command of Tambaram Air Force Station. Rajaram attended the RAF Staff College, Andover and the Imperial Defence College in the United Kingdom in 1953. In December 1955, he was posted as director of personnel in Air HQ. After a three-year stint, he was promoted to the rank of air commodore and appointed senior air staff officer (SASO) of the Operational Command. In 1960, he was promoted to the rank of air vice marshal and took over as the senior directing staff at the National Defence College.

After the Sino-Indian War of 1962, the No. 1 Operational Group was formed at Tezpur in December 1962. Rajaram was appointed the first air officer commanding (AOC). In June 1963, the formation moved to Shillong and was re-designated Eastern Air Command. The appointment of AOC was upgraded to air officer commanding-in-chief (AOC-in-C), and Rajaram took over as the first AOC-in-C of the command in Shillong. In Aug 1963, he moved to Air HQ, having been appointed deputy chief of the air staff (DCAS). As the DCAS, he led the committee of inquiry into the 1963 Poonch Indian Air Force helicopter crash in which five senior officers of the Indian Armed Forces were killed.

On 1 October 1964, Rajaram was appointed air officer commanding-in-chief Western Air Command. He led the Indian Air Force's operations in the Western theatre during the Indo-Pakistani War of 1965. He was awarded the Padma Bhushan for his leadership in the war.

After the war, Rajaram was promoted air marshal in January 1966, and took over as the first commandant of the National Defence College from the Indian Air Force. After a short stint as commandant NDC, he assumed office of the vice chief of air staff (VCAS) in December 1966.

== Death and legacy ==
Rajaram was suffering from leukemia. He was admitted to the military hospital in New Delhi on 14 June 1969, and his condition worsened on 16 June. He died on 18 June at 0855 hours. The chief of the Air Staff Air Chief Marshal Arjan Singh was present when he died. He was cremated with full military honours. His body was carried in a procession from the residence of the Vice Chief at No.6, King George's Avenue (now Rajaji Marg) to the Nigambodh Ghat. All IAF installations in Delhi were closed on the day as a mark of respect. In 1973, the All India Lawn Tennis Association instituted the Air Marshal Rajaram All India Sub-Junior Tennis Trophy in his memory.

Military offices
Preceded by Pratap Chandra Lal	Vice Chief of the Air Staff; 1966–1969	Succeeded by Shivdev Singh
Preceded by Vice Admiral Adhar Kumar Chatterji	Commandant of the National Defence College; 1966–1966	Succeeded by Lieutenant General M M Khanna
Preceded by Arjan Singh	Deputy chief of the air staff 1963–1964	Succeeded by Minoo Merwan Engineer
Preceded by Arjan Singh	Commanding officer No. 1 Squadron IAF; 1944–1945	Succeeded by Edwin Nazirullah
