= Indian Air Force ranks and insignia =

The Indian Air Force (IAF), the aerial component of the Indian Armed Forces follows a certain hierarchy of rank designations and insignia derived from the erstwhile Royal Indian Air Force (RIAF).

== History ==
The Indian Air Force Ensign.

=== 1947–1950 ===
Upon the establishment of India's independence in 1947, the country became a dominion within the British Commonwealth of Nations; nevertheless, the armed forces, namely, the British Indian Army (BIA), the Royal Indian Navy (RIN) and the Royal Indian Air Force (RIAF) - under the helm of King George VI as the Commander-in-Chief, retained their respective pre-independence ranks and corresponding insignia.

=== 1950–present ===
In May 1949, Lord Mountbatten, the inaugural Governor-General of India and himself a naval officer, dispatched a note to Prime Minister Jawaharlal Nehru, titled Names and Insignia of Indian Armed Forces, containing a list of suggestions regarding the nomenclature of the armed forces that were to be enforced upon the dominion's conversion to a republic.

In the note, Mountbatten proposed that the future IAF should retain its predecessor's nomenclature as much as possible - advocating the retention of the RIAF's ranks, insignia, and uniforms. It was later decided that the rank braids of the officers cadre remained unchanged, whilst the three lions of Ashoka i.e., the State Emblem of India should replace the Tudor Crown on the insignia, flying badges and peak caps of airmen ranks. Additionally, busts of the State Emblem and a semi-Chakra were incorporated as the main features on the badges corresponding to Master Warrant Officers (MWO) and Warrant Officers (WO); nonetheless, the MWO's badge was decided to be superimposed on the rank braids of the Pilot Officers.

In September 1949, Nehru forwarded the proposals to the country's minister of defence, Baldev Singh, recommending Mountbatten's suggestions, which were consequently enforced upon India's emergence as a republic on 26 January 1950.

=== Structure ===
Presently, the IAF's rank hierarchy is divided into three broad categories:

- Commissioned Officers (CO)
- Junior Commissioned Officers (JCO)
- Non-Commissioned Officers (NCO)

Equivalent ranks of Indian military
Commission	Indian Navy	Indian Army	Indian Air Force
Commissioned	Admiral of the fleet	Field marshal	Marshal of the Indian Air Force
Commissioned	Admiral	General	Air chief marshal
Commissioned	Vice admiral	Lieutenant general	Air marshal
Commissioned	Rear admiral	Major general	Air vice marshal
Commissioned	Commodore	Brigadier	Air commodore
Commissioned	Captain	Colonel	Group captain
Commissioned	Commander	Lieutenant colonel	Wing commander
Commissioned	Lieutenant commander	Major	Squadron leader
Commissioned	Lieutenant	Captain	Flight lieutenant
Commissioned	Sub lieutenant	Lieutenant	Flying officer
Junior commissioned	Master chief petty officer 1st class	Subedar major (Note: Risaldar major in cavalry and armoured regiments)	Master warrant officer
Junior commissioned	Master chief petty officer 2nd class	Subedar (Note: Risaldar in cavalry and armoured regiments)	Warrant officer
Junior commissioned	Chief petty officer	Naib subedar (Note: Naib risaldar in cavalry and armoured regiments. Called jemadar until 1965.)	Junior warrant officer
Non-commissioned	Petty officer	Havildar/Daffadar	Sergeant
Non-commissioned	Leading seaman	Naik/Lance daffadar	Corporal
Non-commissioned	Seaman 1	Lance naik/Acting Lance-Daffadar	Leading aircraftsman
Non-commissioned	Seaman 2	Sepoy/Sowar	Aircraftsman

== Commissioned Officers ==
Rank group	General / flag officers					Senior officers			Junior officers
Epaulette/Collar rank insignia
Indian Air Force
Indian Air Force	Marshal of the Indian Air Force मार्शल ऑफ द इंडियन एयरफोर्स	Air chief marshal एयर चीफ मार्शल	Air marshal एयर मार्शल	Air vice marshal एयर वाइस मार्शल	Air commodore एयर कमोडोर	Group captain ग्रुप कैप्टन	Wing commander विंग कमांडर	Squadron leader स्क्वाड्रन लीडर	Flight lieutenant फ्लाइट लैफ्टिनेंट	Flying officer फ्लाइंग अफसर

=== Command flags ===
MIAF	ACM	AM	AVM	Air Cdre	Gp Capt	Wg Cdr

The IAF has ten commissioned officer (CO) ranks, of which the highest is that of Marshal of the Indian Air Force (MIAF), a ceremonial five-star rank. The rank was awarded for the first, yet only time in January 2002 to then-retired Air Chief Marshal Arjan Singh DFC, who served as the IAF's third Chief of the Air Staff (CAS) between 1964 and 1969, for his exceptional leadership of the IAF during the 1965 Indo-Pakistan War.

The highest operational rank in the IAF is the four-star rank of Air Chief Marshal, currently held exclusively by the CAS; coincidentally, the first time the rank was awarded was also to Singh in 1966, when he was then an Air Marshal. Before him, CAS appointees belonged to the three-star rank of Air Marshal.

=== Collar tabs ===
Sometime towards the end of Air Chief Marshal S. K. Sareen's tenure in 1998, the IAF introduced a new series gorget patches for its CO cadre - blue collar tabs embossed with white stars denoting the rank of the particular wearer; five for MIAF, four for Air Chief Marshal, three for Air Marshal, two for Air Vice Marshal and one for Air Commodore. Initially, for the rank of Air Marshal, the collar tabs did not immediately distinguish between the positions of Vice Chief of the Air Staff (VCAS), Air Officer Commanding-in-Chief (AOC-in-C) and other three-star designated positions; however, later three-star collar tabs were embossed with a wreath design to solely indicate the positions of VCAS and AOC-in-C.

== Junior commissioned officer and non-commissioned ranks ==
The rank of Master Warrant Officer was introduced in February 1950.

Rank group	Subordinate Officers (SO)			Non commissioned officers (NCO)		Enlisted
Indian Air Force							No insignia
Indian Air Force	Master warrant officer मास्टर वारंट अफसर	Warrant officer वारंट अफसर	Junior warrant officer जूनियर वारंट अफसर	Sergeant सार्जेंट	Corporal कॉरपोरल	Leading aircraftsman लीडिंग एयरक्राफ्ट्समैन	Aircraftsman एयरक्राफ्ट्समैन

== Former ranks ==
Effective from 16 May 1977, the rank of Flight Sergeant was abolished and replaced with the rank of Junior Warrant Officer; existing warrant officer rank insignia were modified accordingly.

The rank of Pilot Officer is no longer in use; all new officers are commissioned as Flying Officers.

Former/Discontinued Ranks
	Officers		Non-commissioned officers
Shoulder; Insignia		Arm
Rank	Pilot officer पायलट अफसर		Warrant officer वारंट अफसर	Junior warrant officer जूनियर वारंट अफसर	Flight sergeant फ्लाइट सार्जेंट

== Specialisation badges ==
Badge	Description	Specialisation allowance(s)
IAF Pilot Badge	Pilot Badge	₹25,000 (US$260) per month for officers
	Police Badge	—N/a
	Parachute instructor Badge	₹3,600 (US$37) per month for officers; ₹2,700 (US$28) per month for airmen
	Navigator Badge	—N/a
	SAGW Badge	—N/a
	Signaler Badge	—N/a
	Loadmaster Badge	—N/a
	Flight Control & Administration Badge	—N/a
	Gunner Badge	—N/a
	Parachutist Badge	—N/a
	Air Traffic Control (ATC) Badge	—N/a
	Engineer badge	—N/a
	Medical officer & Flight surgeon badge	20% of basic pay for officers as Non-practising Allowance (NPA); ₹11,220 (US$120) to ₹40,000 (US$420) per month for medical officers
	Garud Commando badge (special forces)	₹25,000 (US$260) per month

== Rank description ==
=== Commissioned Officers ===
Rank	Shoulder Insignia	Description	Appointments	Superannuation Age/Tenure	Rank flag	Pay level
Marshal of the Indian Air Force		Five-star ceremonial rank; highest possible rank in the IAF, awarded only once for exceptional service during wartime	Honorary position, therefore no active command	Lifetime		—N/a
Air Chief Marshal		Four-star rank; professional head of the Indian Armed Forces (when appointed), or commander of the Indian Air Force	Chief of Defence Staff (CDS); Chief of the Air Staff (CAS)	65 years (CDS); 62 years (CAS)		Level 18 (apex)
Air Marshal (C-in-C grade)		Three-star rank; authority over Air Commands	Air Officer Commanding-in-Chief (AOC-in-C) of Western, Eastern, Central, Southern, South Western, Maintenance, and Training Commands; Vice Chief of Air Staff (VCAS); Commander-in-Chief Strategic Forces Command (tri-service nuclear command)	60 years		Level 17
Air marshal		Three-star rank; senior operational and staff authority	Deputy Chiefs of Air Staff, Air Officer-in-Charge (Personnel, Administration, Operations, etc.), Director General (Inspection, Flight Safety, etc.), Commandants of tri-service defence colleges like NDA, DSSC	60 years		Level 15
Air Vice Marshal		Two-star rank; middle-level senior leadership	Senior Air Staff Officer, Senior Maintenance Staff Officer, Principal Directors, Air Defence Command roles, Air Attachés, Commandants of key training institutions	58 years		Level 14
Air Commodore		One-star rank; base-level leadership and strategic functions	Air Officer Commanding (AOC) of Air Force Stations, Directors at Air HQ, Group Commanders, Air Defence Directors	57 years		Level 13A
Group Captain		Senior field rank; comparable to Colonel in the Army	Station Commanders, Staff roles at Air HQ, Commanding Officers of large operational units	54 years		Level 13
Wing Commander		Mid-level field rank	Commanding Officers of Squadrons, Flights, smaller bases, and key staff officers	52 years		Level 12A
Squadron Leader		Junior field rank	Flight Commanders, Deputies to COs, operational staff positions	52 years	—N/a	Level 11
Flight Lieutenant		Junior officer rank	Flight leads, various operational & administrative duties	52 years	—N/a	Level 10B
Flying Officer		Entry-level commissioned officer rank	Junior pilots, initial staff appointments	52 years	—N/a	Level 10

=== Junior Commissioned Officers (JCOs) ===
Rank	Rank Insignia	Description	Appointments	Superannuation Age/Tenure	Pay level
Master Warrant Officer (MWO)		Senior-most JCO rank; acts as a bridge between commissioned officers and airmen. Provides leadership, discipline, and professional guidance.	Station Warrant Officer (SWO), senior advisory positions to Station Commander	56 years	Level 8
Warrant Officer (WO)		Second-highest JCO rank; supervises large units or sections, responsible for operational readiness and discipline.	Unit Warrant Officer, Senior Trade Supervisor, Deputy SWO	56 years	Level 7
Junior Warrant Officer (JWO)		Entry-level JCO rank; experienced non-commissioned leader, responsible for mentoring and leading sergeants and other NCOs.	Section In-Charge, Senior Instructor, Supervisory appointments in technical and administrative trades	52 years	Level 6

=== Non-commissioned officers (NCOs) and enlisted ===
Rank	Rank Insignia	Description	Appointments	Superannuation Age/Tenure	Pay level
Sergeant		Senior NCO rank; responsible for supervising corporals and airmen, maintaining discipline, and ensuring operational readiness of a flight or section.	Flight Sergeant, Trade Section Leader, Training Supervisor	52 years	Level 5
Corporal		Mid-level NCO rank; assists sergeants in supervision and training of junior airmen, performs technical and administrative duties.	Deputy Flight Sergeant, Section 2IC, Senior Technician roles	52 years	Level 4
Aircraftsman		experienced in trade duties and often acts as a mentor to junior recruits	Senior Operator, Team Lead in trade-specific duties	52 years	Level 3
Aircraftsman	—N/a	Entry-level rank for all airmen after basic training; performs basic operational, technical, and support duties under supervision.	Junior technician, trainee roles, general duties	52 years	Level 3

== See also ==
- Comparative military ranks
- Indian Army ranks and insignia
- Indian Navy ranks and insignia
- Coast Guard ranks and insignia of India
- Border Roads Organisation ranks and insignia of India
- Paramilitary forces ranks and insignia of India
- Police ranks and insignia of India
