= Navy Master Chief Petty Officer =

Senior most junior commissioned officer of the Indian Navy

Master Chief Petty Officer of Indian Navy
- Badge of MCPO of the Navy

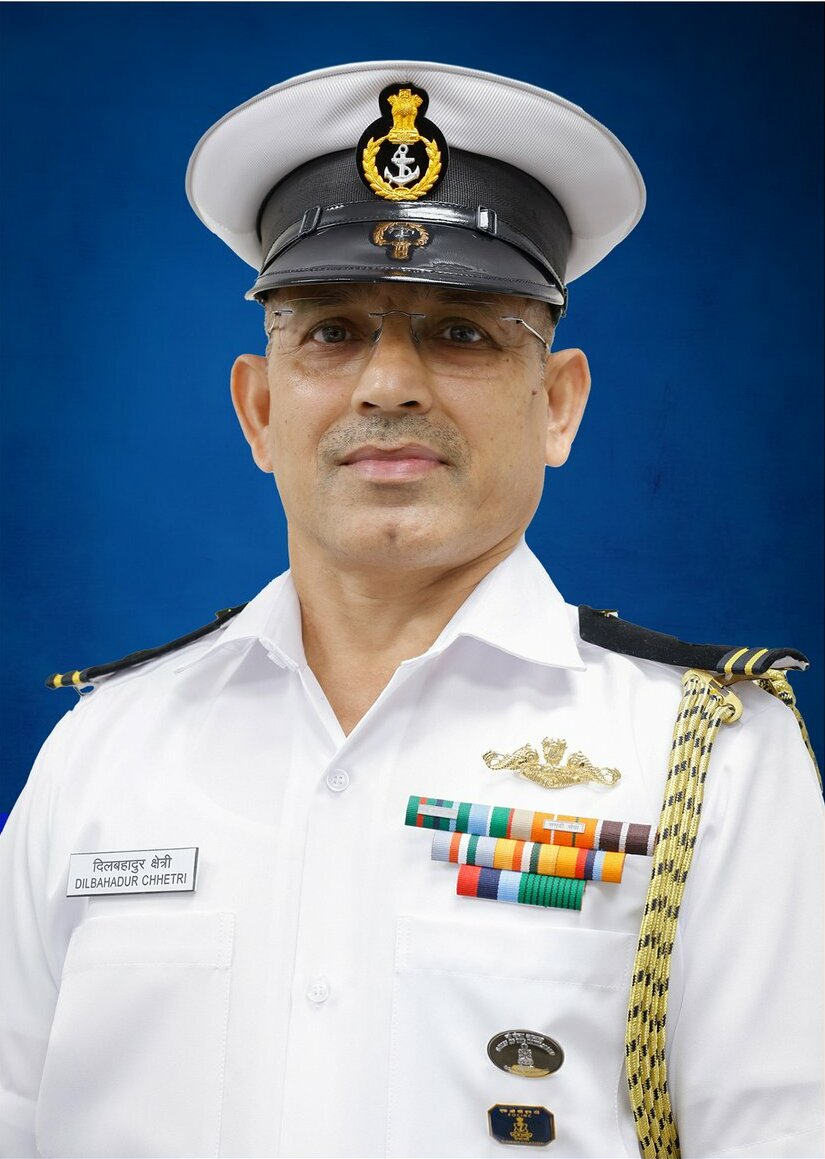
- Incumbent; Dilbahadur Chhetri, VSM; MCERA I, since 29 June 2023
- Indian Navy
- Style: MaSaab
- Type: Ceremonial, consultative
- Abbreviation: Navy MCPO
- Reports to: Chief of the Naval Staff
- Appointer: Chief of Naval Staff; with approval from Ministry of Defence
- Term length: Until 60 years of age; No restriction on renewal
- Formation: 1 May 2022; 4 years ago
- First holder: Rajendra Kumar Behera, MCPO I
- Salary: Pay level 9

The Navy Master Chief Petty Officer (Navy MCPO) is a unique non-commissioned position of office of the Indian Navy. The holder of this position is the most senior rating of the Indian Navy, equivalent to the Indian Air Force Master Warrant Officer (IAF MWO).

The Navy MCPO is appointed by the Chief of the Naval Staff (CNS) to foster seamless communication between CNS and sailors. The current Navy MCPO is Dilbahadur Chhetri, MCERA I, VSM.

== Origin ==
The first Navy MCPO, Rajendra Kumar Behera, was appointed by the 25th Chief of the Naval Staff Admiral R. Hari Kumar on 1 May 2022. The appointment of a senior enlisted leader serving as advisor to the CNS was to ensure seamless integration, effective communication and drive the change for a future-proof Indian Navy. The Navy MCPO holds the mantle of fostering seamless communication between the CNS and sailors.

== Insignia ==
The Navy MCPO retains their rank and wear the insignia of Master Chief Petty Officer. In addition, they wear the aiguillettes presented by the CNS.

== List of officeholders ==
No.	Portrait	Name (born–died)	Term of office			Ref.
No.	Portrait	Name (born–died)	Took office	Left office	Time in office	Ref.
1		MCPO I Rajendra Kumar Behera	1 May 2022	30 June 2023	1 year, 60 days	
2		MCERA I Dilbahadur Chhetri, VSM	30 June 2023	Incumbent	3 years, 83 days	
