= Arjan Singh =

Marshal of the Indian Air Force

Marshal of the Indian Air Force Arjan Singh DFC
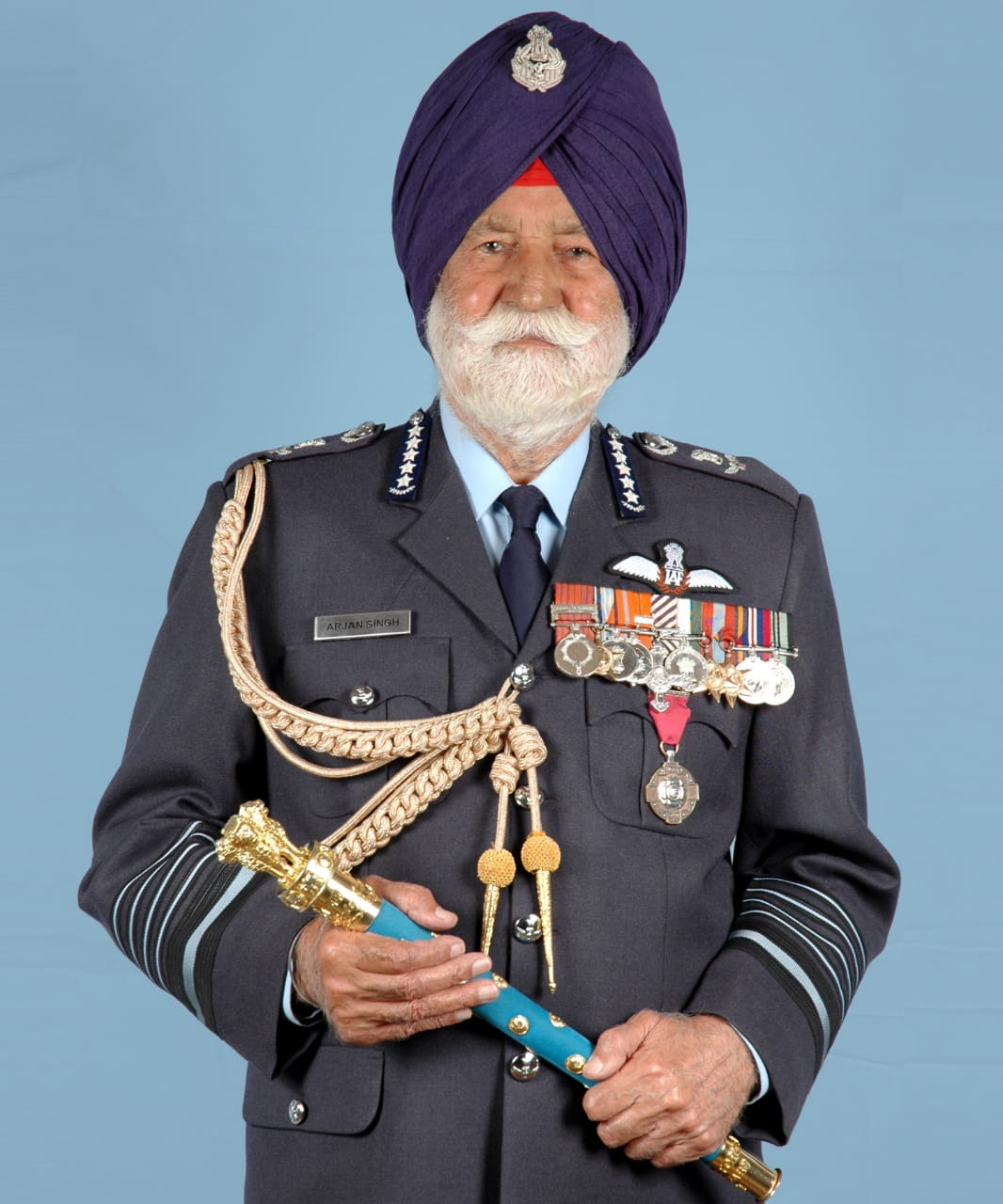
- MIAF Arjan Singh in his Marshal of the Indian Air Force uniform

12th Lieutenant Governor of Delhi
- In office 12 December 1989 – December 1990
- Appointed by: President of India (then, R. Venkataraman)
- Preceded by: Romesh Bhandari
- Succeeded by: Markandey Singh

11th High Commissioner of India to Kenya
- In office 1974–1977
- President: V. V. Giri; Fakhruddin Ali Ahmed; B. D. Jatti; Neelam Sanjiva Reddy
- Prime Minister: Indira Gandhi; Morarji Desai
- Preceded by: K. C. Nair
- Succeeded by: A. N. D. Haksar

9th Ambassador of India to Switzerland, the Holy See and Liechtenstein
- In office 27 March 1971 – 26 March 1974
- President: V. V. Giri
- Prime Minister: Indira Gandhi
- Preceded by: M. A. Hussain
- Succeeded by: Avtar Singh

12th Chairman of the Chiefs of Staff Committee
- In office 7 June 1966 – 15 July 1969
- President: Sir S. Radhakrishnan; Zakir Husain; V. V. Giri
- Prime Minister: Gulzarilal Nanda (acting); Indira Gandhi
- Preceded by: Jayanto Nath Chaudhuri
- Succeeded by: Adhar Kumar Chatterji

3rd Chief of the Air Staff
- In office 1 August 1964 – 15 July 1969
- President: Sir S. Radhakrishnan; Zakir Husain; V. V. Giri
- Prime Minister: Lal Bahadur Shastri; Gulzarilal Nanda (acting); Indira Gandhi
- Preceded by: Aspy Merwan Engineer
- Succeeded by: Pratap Chandra Lal

Personal details
- Born: 15 April 1919 Lyallpur, Punjab, British India (now Faisalabad, Punjab, Pakistan)
- Died: 16 September 2017 (aged 98) New Delhi, India
- Spouse: Teji Singh (m. 1948; died 2011)
- Children: 3

Military service
- Allegiance: British India (1938–1947); India (from 1947)
- Branch/service: Royal Indian Air Force (1938–1947); Indian Air Force (1947–1969, 2002–2017) (Note: Indian military officers of five-star rank hold their rank for life, and are considered to be serving officers until their deaths.)
- Years of service: 1938–1969; 2002–2017 (Note: Like U.S. military officers (U.S. Army and U.S. Navy officers), Indian military officers of five-star rank hold their rank for life, and are considered to be serving officers until their deaths.)
- Rank: Marshal of the Indian Air Force
- Commands: Chief of the Air Staff; Operational Command; Ambala Air Force Station; Air Force Station Kohat; Air Force Station Risalpur; No. 1 Squadron IAF
- Battles/wars: World War II; Indo-Pakistani War of 1947; Indo-Pakistani War of 1965
- Awards: Padma Vibhushan; Distinguished Flying Cross
- Later work(s): Chairman, IIT Delhi; Director, Grindlays Bank; National Commission for Minorities

Marshal of the Indian Air Force Arjan Singh, DFC (15 April 1919 – 16 September 2017) was a senior air officer of the Indian Air Force. He served as the 3rd Chief of the Air Staff from 1964 to 1969, leading the Air Force through the Indo-Pakistani War of 1965. He was the first and only officer of the Indian Air Force (IAF) to be promoted to five-star rank as Marshal of the Indian Air Force, equal to the army rank of field marshal.

Singh attended the Royal Air Force College Cranwell at the age of 19 and graduated in 1939. He joined the No. 1 Squadron IAF and served in the North-West Frontier Province. In World War II, he commanded this squadron during the Arakan Campaign and was awarded the Distinguished Flying Cross. In 1945, he attended the RAF Staff College, Bracknell. After the Partition of India in 1947, he led the first fly-past of Royal Indian Air Force (RIAF) aircraft over the Red Fort in Delhi. He then commanded Air Force Station, Ambala at the rank of group captain. In 1950, after completing the staff course at Joint Service Defence College, Latimer, Buckinghamshire, he was promoted to the rank of air commodore and took over the operational command. He commanded the Operational Command in two stints. In 1958, the post was upgraded to air officer commanding-in-chief at the rank of air vice marshal.

After attending the Imperial Defence College in 1960, he served as the air officer in charge of administration at Air Headquarters. In 1963, he took over as the deputy chief of the air staff and then as the vice chief of the air staff. Singh assumed office as the chief of the air staff, on 1 August 1964. For his distinguished service in commanding the IAF during the Indo-Pakistani War of 1965, he was awarded the Padma Vibhushan and in 1966 became the first IAF officer to be promoted to air chief marshal.

After retiring from the IAF, Singh served as a diplomat, politician and advisor to the Government of India. He served as India's ambassador to Switzerland, the Holy See and Liechtenstein from 1971 to 1974 and as the high commissioner of India to Kenya from 1974 to 1977. He then served as the lieutenant governor of Delhi from 1989 to 1990. In January 2002, the rank of marshal of the Indian Air Force was conferred on Singh, the first and only officer of the IAF to receive the honour.

== Early life and education ==
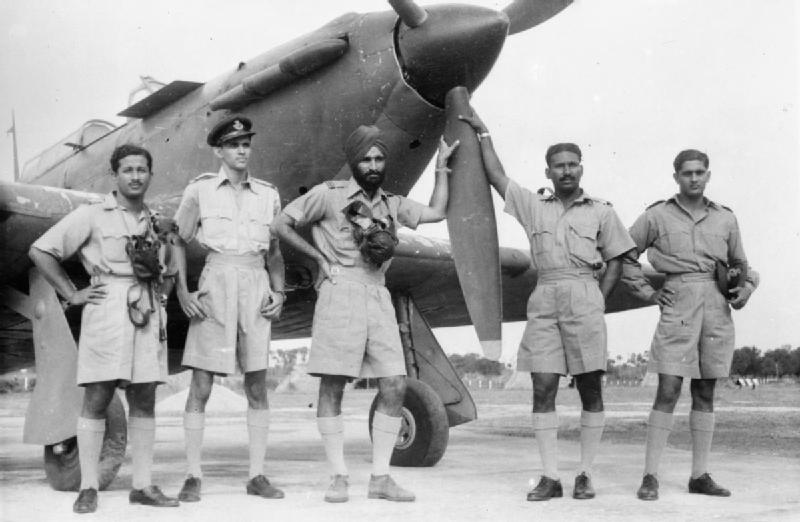
Arjan Singh as a Flight Lieutenant with a group Indian pilots from No.1 Squadron standing by a Hawker Hurricane IIc. L to R : Ibrahim, Homi Ratnagar, Arjan Singh, Henry and Murcot. World War II.

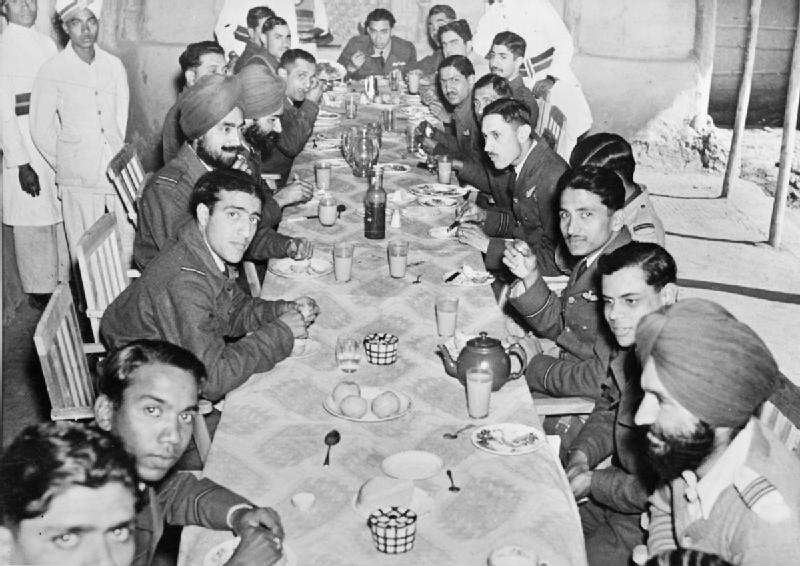
Officers of No. 1 Squadron IAF sit down to tiffin in their mess at Imphal Main, India. At lower right sits the CO Sqn Ldr Arjan Singh. Next to him is Flt Lt R Rajaram.

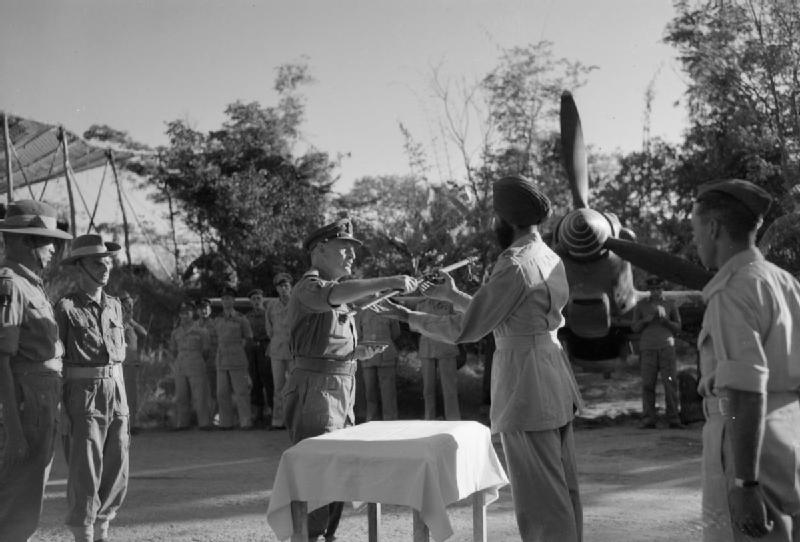
CO No.1 Sqn Ldr Arjan Singh, DFC being presented with a Japanese Sword by GOC 20 Div Maj Gen D D Gracey, OBE

Singh was born on 15 April 1919 in Lyallpur (now Faisalabad), a town in the erstwhile Punjab Province of British India (in present-day Pakistan), into a Punjabi Jat Sikh family of Aulakh clan. Men from the family had joined the armed forces, in keeping with community traditions, and Singh was the fourth generation of his family to join the British Indian armed forces.

Singh's father was a Lance Daffadar in the Hodson's Horse at the time of his birth, and retired as a full Risaldar in the cavalry, serving for a time as ADC to a division commander. His grandfather Risaldar Major Hukam Singh served in the Guides Cavalry between 1883 and 1917, and great-grandfather, Naib Risaldar Sultana Singh, was among the first two generations of the Guides Cavalry enlisted in 1854; he was martyred during the Afghan campaign of 1879. Thus, after three generations of men serving in the lower and middle ranks of the army, Singh was to become the first member of his family to become a commissioned officer.

Singh was educated at Montgomery, British India (now Sahiwal, Pakistan) and was a well-known sportsman. Singh then attended the Government College Lahore. He was the captain of the college swimming team and set four Punjab and four University records in swimming. He also won the All-India one-mile swimming event in 1938. Singh entered the RAF College Cranwell in 1938. At the College, he was the vice captain of the swimming, athletic and hockey teams.

== Military career ==
=== World War II ===
Singh on seeing action during WWII

"The IAF had already extensive experience of fighting against the Pathans in the North-West Frontier Province, but I was eager to go into battle against the Japanese, then poised for an attack on eastern India, especially the Imphal-Kohima front."

—

Singh was commissioned as a Pilot Officer in December 1939, after topping the Empire Pilot training course among his batch of Indian Cadets. He joined No. 1 Squadron which was then stationed at Air Force Station Kohat in the North-West Frontier Province (NWFP) and flew Westland Wapiti biplanes. The Squadron was conducting operations against the tribal forces in NWFP, in which he participated. While flying with the squadron in NWFP, Singh's Hawker Audax was shot down by the Pathans. He crashed in a dry stream in the midst of a fight between British troops and the Pathans. He was not hurt and within two weeks he was flying again in the same area. According to Singh, fighting in the NWFP prepared the squadron for the fight against the Japanese. He then was transferred to the newly-formed No. 2 Squadron for a brief period. He was transferred back to No. 1 Squadron in the rank of Flying Officer. By this time, the squadron had been re-equipped with Hawker Hurricane aircraft.

In 1943, Singh was promoted to acting squadron leader and became the commanding officer of No. 1 Squadron. Frustrated with watch and ward duty, Singh wanted to be in the thick of action. He met the Commander-in-Chief, India, General (later Field Marshal) Claude Auchinleck during his visit to Kohat in the North-West Frontier Province and requested him to send the squadron to fight the Japanese. The squadron was then inducted into the war and moved to Imphal in early 1944.

Singh led No. 1 Squadron into combat during the Arakan Campaign in 1944. He was awarded the Distinguished Flying Cross (DFC) in June 1944. He was presented with the DFC by Lord Mountbatten, the Supreme Allied Commander, South East Asia Command at Imphal. Singh later said about the award, “For a young man to get such a medal in front of his own squadron is a great satisfaction. I was a part of the squadron, and they were my part."

The citation for the DFC reads as follows:

CITATION

Acting Squadron Leader Arjan Singh (IND/1577)

Indian Air Force, No. 1 (IAF) Squadron

This officer has completed very many operational missions involving flights over difficult country, often in bad weather. He has displayed outstanding leadership, great skill and courage, qualities which have been reflected in the high morale and efficiency of the squadron which has won much success.

Singh relinquished command of No. 1 Squadron in December 1944, handing over to Squadron Leader Ramaswamy Rajaram, who led the squadron for the rest of the Burma Campaign. Singh almost faced a court-martial in February 1945 when he tried to raise the morale of a trainee pilot (later rumoured to be the future Air Chief Marshal Dilbagh Singh) by conducting a low level air pass over a house in Kerala. In his defence, he insisted that such tricks were needed for every cadet to be a fighter pilot. Later that year, he commanded the Indian Air Force Exhibition Flight. In February 1945, Singh was promoted to the rank of Wing Commander and in August, he was selected to attend the Staff course at the RAF Staff College, Bracknell in the United Kingdom. On his return, he commanded the Air Force Station Kohat and Air Force Station Risalpur.

=== Post independence ===
As part of the celebrations for Independence Day on 15 August 1947, Singh, by then an acting Group Captain, led the first fly-past of RIAF aircraft over the Red Fort in Delhi. Singh then assumed command of the frontline Airbase Air Force Station, Ambala. He led the airbase during the Partition of India. Singh subsequently moved to Air Headquarters in 1948 and tenanted the appointment of Director of Training. In 1949, Singh attended the Joint Service Defence College at Latimer, Buckinghamshire in the United Kingdom.

On his return to India, in December 1950, Singh was promoted to acting Air Commodore and assumed command of the No. 1 Operational Command (later rechristened Western Air Command). In late 1952, Singh moved to the Air Headquarters and was appointed Air Officer-in-Charge Personnel and Organisation. This appointment was later upgraded to Air Vice Marshal and then to Air Marshal, and is now termed Air Officer-in-charge Personnel (AOP). He simultaneously held the appointment of Air Officer Commanding Air Force Station New Delhi. Singh served in this appointment for three years, until December 1955.

Promoted to substantive Air Commodore, Singh again served as the AOC Operational Command, for the second time. In 1956, Singh led a squadron of Toofani jet fighters to Burma on a goodwill mission. Singh also served as the Chef de Mission of the Indian Contingent for the 1956 Summer Olympics held at Melbourne, Australia. In May 1958, Singh was promoted to the rank of Air Vice Marshal and continued as the head of the Operational Command. The appointment was upgraded to Air Officer Commanding-in-Chief (AOC-in-C) Operational Command. He led the Operational Command until November 1959, handing over command to Air Vice Marshal Erlic Pinto. Singh has the distinction of being the longest serving head of the Operational Command. He led the Command for a total of six years in two stints - December 1950 to December 1952 and December 1955 to November 1959.

Singh was selected to attend the Imperial Defence College and proceeded to United Kingdom in early 1960. After completing the year-long course, he returned to India and assumed charge as the Air Officer in Charge Administration at Air Headquarters. He tenanted this appointment through the Sino-Indian War. By the end of the war, Singh took over as the Deputy Chief of the Air Staff (DCAS), and in August 1963, he took over as the Vice Chief of the Air Staff (VCAS). As the VCAS, Singh was the overall commander of the joint air exercises "Shiksha" with the United States Air Force (USAF), Royal Air Force (RAF) and the Royal Australian Air Force (RAAF) which was held in India.

=== Chief of the Air Staff ===
In May 1964, the Government of India decided to appoint Singh as the Chief of the Air Staff (CAS), succeeding Air Marshal Aspy Engineer, DFC. On 1 August 1964, Singh was promoted to the rank of Air Marshal and took over as the 6th Chief of the Air Staff. When appointed as Chief of the Air Staff of the Indian Air Force, he was around 45 years old.

==== Indo-Pakistani War of 1965 ====
In August 1965, as part of Operation Gibraltar, Pakistan attempted to infiltrate forces into Jammu and Kashmir to precipitate an insurgency against Indian rule. This was followed by a full-scale war between India and Pakistan in the Western theatre. In September, Pakistan launched Operation Grand Slam in which an armoured thrust targeted the Akhnoor and Chhamb regions in Jammu. The Indian Air Force responded to an urgent call for air strikes against the Pakistani Army. Singh was summoned into the Defence Minister Y B Chavan's office with a request for air support. With a characteristic nonchalance, he replied "in an hour." True to his word, the armoured thrust was hit in an hour by the IAF. Although the IAF suffered some losses early on, it bounced back and scored strategic victories during the conflict. The war ended with a ceasefire being declared by both nations on 23 September. Singh led the IAF during the war showing unparalleled leadership and remained cool and inspirational throughout.

Singh was awarded India's second-highest civilian award, the Padma Vibhushan for his leadership during the war. On 15 January 1966, in recognition of the contribution of the IAF, the post of the CAS was upgraded to the rank of Air Chief Marshal. Singh became the first Officer to hold the rank of Air Chief Marshal.

On 7 June 1966, with the retirement of General Jayanto Nath Chaudhuri, Singh took over as the Chairman of the Chiefs of Staff Committee, a post he held until he retired. In 1967, in a rare honour to a non-British Service Chief, Singh was invited to receive the salute as the reviewing officer of the passing out parade at his alma mater, the RAF College Cranwell.

After heading the IAF for almost five years, the second-longest term as Chief of the Air Staff in history, Singh retired in July 1969, at the age of 50.

== Diplomatic and political career ==
In 1971, after his retirement, Singh was appointed India's Ambassador to Switzerland, the Holy See and Liechtenstein. He presented his credentials to the President of the Swiss Confederation, Rudolf Gnägi on 2 April 1971.

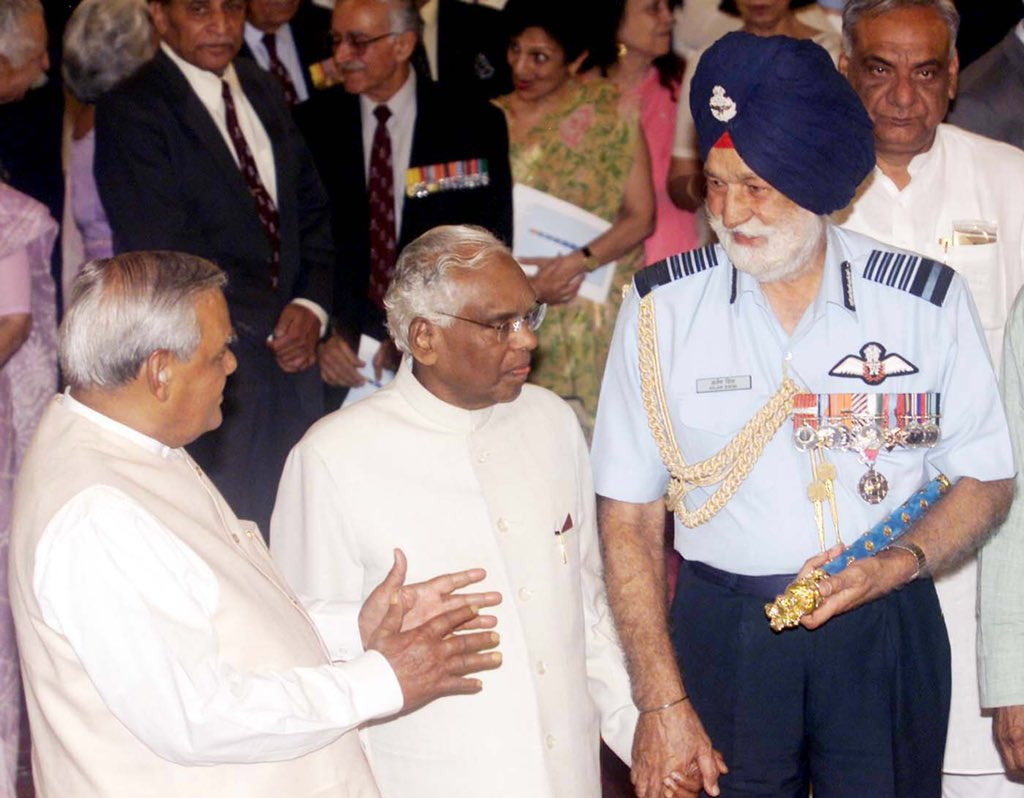
MIAF Arjan Singh carrying the Marshal's baton with the President of India, K. R. Narayanan and Prime Minister of India, Atal Bihari Vajpayee after being promoted to Five Star rank in a ceremony at the Rashtrapati Bhavan.

After a three-year stint at Bern, Singh then took over as the High Commissioner of India to Kenya in 1974. Singh spent three years heading the High Commission of India at Nairobi, till 1977. Subsequently, he served as a member of the National Commission for Minorities from 1978 to 1981.

Singh also served as the chairman of the Indian Institute of Technology Delhi from 1980 to 1983 and was a director of the Grindlays Bank from 1981 to 1988.

He was very moved by the attacks on Sikhs during the 1984 anti-sikh riots, and had given lots of help to Jagjit Singh Aurora when he was forming The Sikh Forum in 1985, where he was a member and regular speaker.

On 12 December 1989, Singh was appointed Lieutenant Governor of Delhi by the president of India. He served in the position for a year, till December 1990.

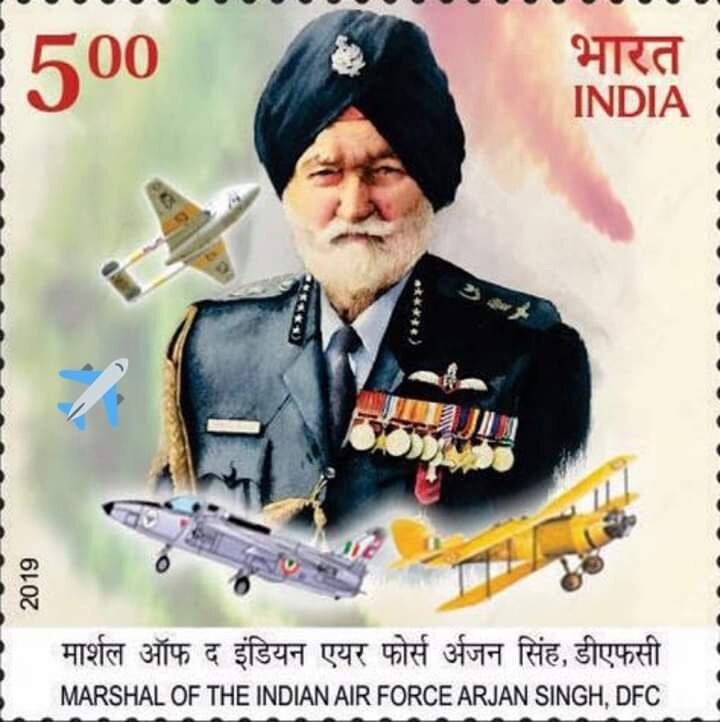
Singh on a 2019 stamp of India

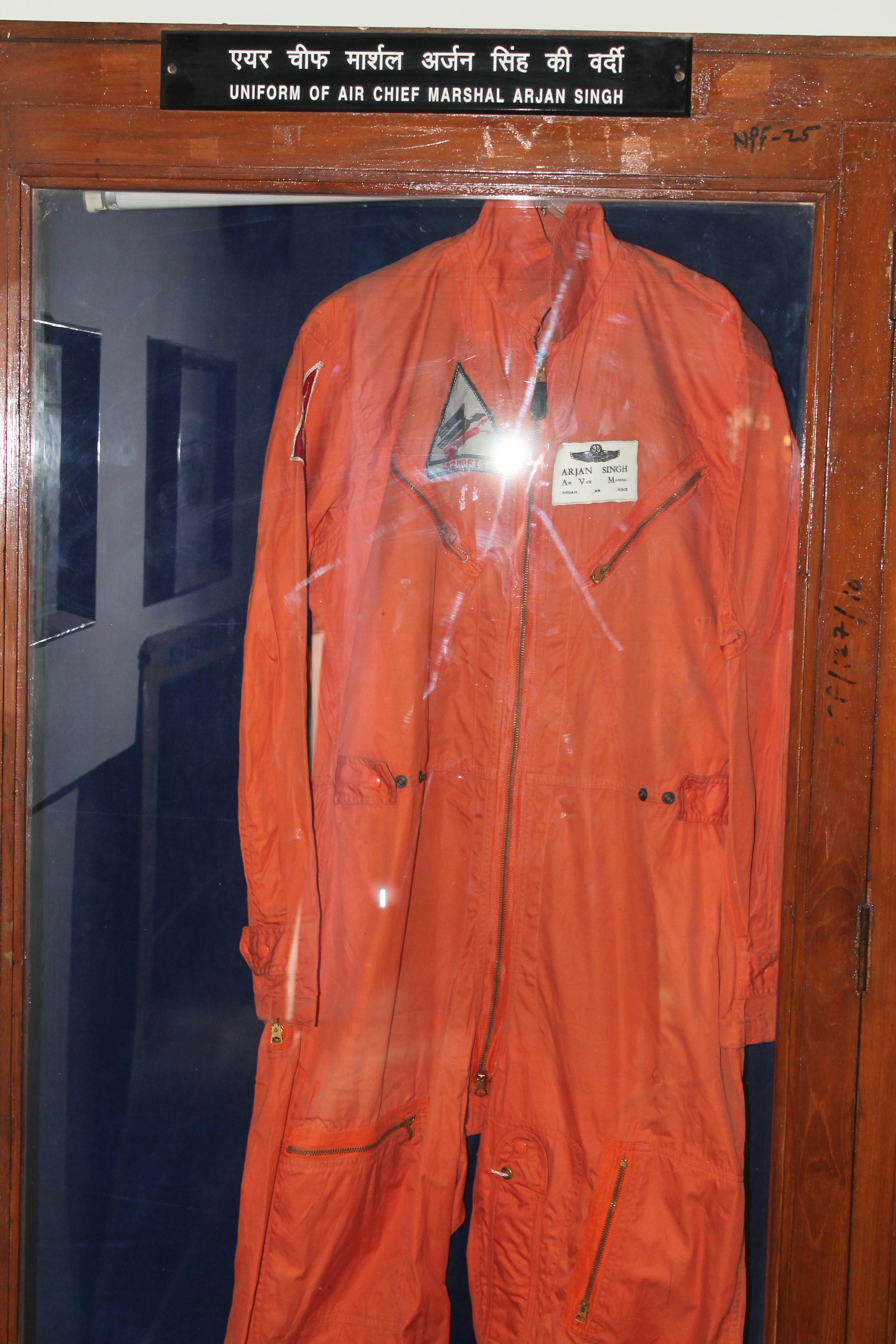
Uniform of Air Chief Marshal Arjan Singh at Air Force Museum in Delhi

== Promotion to Marshal of the Indian Air Force ==
Pushpindar Singh Chopra (a well-known aviator) and Tarlochan Singh (of the National Commission for Minorities) had requested the Indian Government that due to his distinguished service, the honor of being the first (and only) Air Marshal should have been conferred on Arjan Singh. On 25 January 2002, the Government of India announced that the rank of Marshal of the Indian Air Force was to be conferred on Air Chief Marshal Arjan Singh, DFC, with effect from 26 January 2002, in recognition of the most valuable services to the Air Force and the Nation. The rank is the highest in the Indian Air Force. It is equivalent to Field Marshal and is held for life. The President of India, K. R. Narayanan conferred the Five-star rank on Marshal of the Indian Air Force Arjan Singh and handed the Marshal's baton in a ceremony at the Rashtrapati Bhavan on 23 April 2002.

== Personal life ==
In 1948, Singh married Teji Singh, a lady of his own community and similar family background, in a match arranged by their families. They were married for 63 years before her death in April 2011. In 1949, their first daughter Amrita was born. Three years later, her brother Arvind Singh was born and the Singhs' youngest child Asha followed another three years later. Teji Singh was the maternal aunt of actress Mandira Bedi.

== Later years and death ==
Singh's health declined in his final years, and he frequently made references to growing old and the death of many of his friends. In July 2015, then aged 96 and using a wheelchair due to a temporary indisposition, he was among the many dignitaries to lay a wreath at the base of the coffin carrying the mortal remains of former President A.P.J. Abdul Kalam at Palam Airport. He paid his last respects to President Kalam at Palam Airport on 28 July. He remained active even at 98, continuing to take tea and to play golf twice a week at the Delhi Golf Club.

Singh suffered a cardiac arrest at his New Delhi residence in the early morning of 16 September 2017 and was rushed to the Army Hospital, Research and Referral, in New Delhi, where his condition was stated to be critical. He died at 7:47 p.m. (IST) that evening. After his passing, his body was returned to his home at 7A Kautilya Marg in New Delhi, where numerous visitors and dignitaries offered their respects, including President Ram Nath Kovind, Prime Minister Narendra Modi, Defence Minister Nirmala Sitharaman and the three service chiefs of the Indian Armed Forces. Accorded a state funeral by the Indian government, he was cremated at Brar Square in New Delhi on 18 September with full military honours, including a military flypast by IAF fighter jets and helicopters. The National Flag flew at half-mast in Delhi. He was still very involved in aviation and the air force after retirement.

== Legacy ==
Singh was the first officer to have kept his flying rank until he became CAS. He had flown over 60 different types of aircraft from Pre-WWII era biplanes to Folland Gnats and de Havilland Vampires. He also had flown in transports like the Lockheed L-1049 Super Constellation. Singh remained active and worked for the welfare of air force veterans, contributing twenty million rupees from his personal wealth to set up a trust to this end. He was considered a father figure of the service.

The Air Force Sports Control Board organises an annual Marshal Arjan Singh Memorial All India Hockey Tournament. The IAF celebrated the birth centenary of the Marshal in April 2019. Events over a period of one year were planned across the country. The celebrations started with a seminar at Air Headquarters titled "Air Power in the 2040s: Impact of Technology", as a tribute to his vision of the Air Force. The then Chief of the Air Staff Air Chief Marshal Birender Singh Dhanoa also unveiled a bust of the Marshal at Air Headquarters. IAF and the United Services Institution of India (USI) conduct the Marshal of the Air Force Arjan Singh Annual Lecture. The first lecture was delivered in December 2023 by former Chief of the Air Staff Air Chief Marshal R. K. S. Bhadauria.

=== Air Force Station Arjan Singh ===
On 14 April 2016, at an event to mark the Marshal's 97th birthday, the then Chief of Air Staff Air Chief Marshal Arup Raha announced that the Indian Air Force base at Panagarh in West Bengal was being renamed to Air Force Station Arjan Singh in honor of the Marshal's service. The airbase was constructed in 1944 by the United States Air Force in the China Burma India Theater during World War II, the same theatre that Singh served in during the war.

== Awards and decorations ==

Padma Vibhushan	General Service Medal 1947		Samar Seva Star
Raksha Medal	Sainya Seva Medal	Indian Independence Medal	Distinguished Flying Cross
1939–1945 Star	Burma Star	War Medal 1939–1945	India Service Medal

== Dates of rank ==
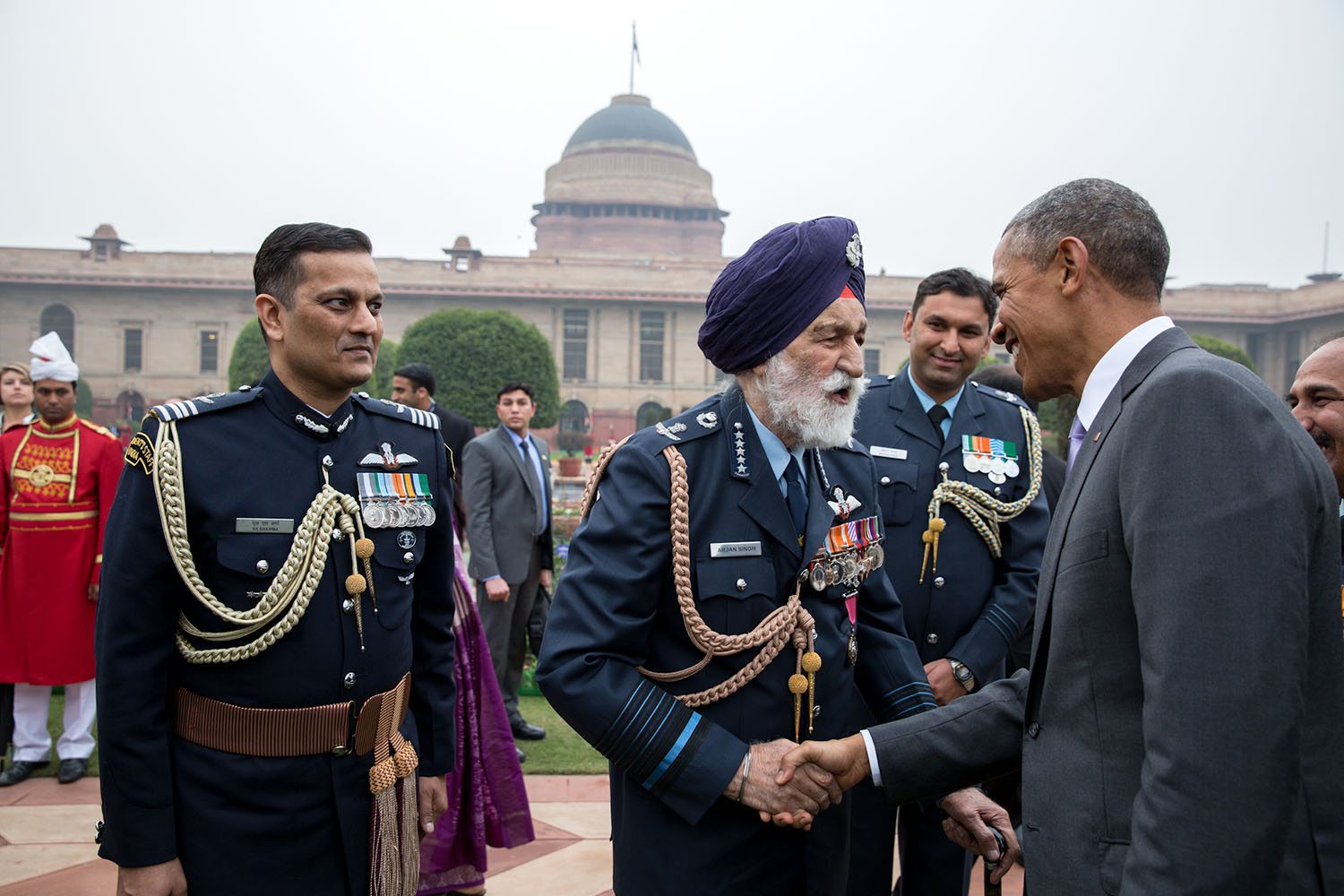
U.S. President Barack Obama greets Singh in the forecourt of Rashtrapati Bhawan during India's republic day parade, 2015.

Flag of the Marshal of Indian Air Force

Insignia	Rank	Component	Date of rank
	Pilot Officer	Royal Indian Air Force	23 December 1939
	Flying Officer	Royal Indian Air Force	23 June 1941
	Flight Lieutenant	Royal Indian Air Force	15 May 1942
	Squadron Leader	Royal Indian Air Force	1 April 1944 (acting); 18 May 1945 (substantive)
	Wing Commander	Royal Indian Air Force	February 1945 (acting); 15 August 1948 (substantive)
	Group Captain	Royal Indian Air Force	16 August 1947 (acting)
	Group Captain	Indian Air Force	26 January 1950 (recommissioning and change in insignia); 15 August 1952 (substantive)
	Air Commodore	Indian Air Force	12 December 1950 (acting); 1 October 1955 (substantive)
	Air Vice Marshal	Indian Air Force	1 May 1958 (acting); 16 June 1960 (substantive)
	Air Marshal (CAS)	Indian Air Force	1 August 1964 (acting); 1 December 1964 (substantive)
	Air Chief Marshal (CAS)	Indian Air Force	15 January 1966
	Marshal of the Indian Air Force	Indian Air Force	26 January 2002

== See also ==
- Field Marshal K M Cariappa
- Field Marshal Sam Manekshaw

== Notes ==
=== Citations ===
Military offices
Preceded by Surendra Nath Goyal	Commanding officer No. 1 Squadron IAF; 1943–1944	Succeeded by Ramaswamy Rajaram
Preceded by Mehar Singh	Commanding Officer, RAF Station Kohat; 1947–1947	Partition of India
Preceded by Aspy Engineer	Air Officer Commanding Operational Command; 1950–1952	Succeeded by Atma Ram Nanda
Preceded by Atma Ram Nanda	Air Officer Commanding-in-Chief Operational Command; 1955–1959	Succeeded by Erlic Pinto
Preceded by Diwan Atma Ram Nanda	Deputy Chief of the Air Staff (India); 1963–1963	Succeeded by Ramaswamy Rajaram
Preceded by Aspy Engineer	Vice Chief of the Air Staff (India); 1963–1964	Succeeded by Pratap Chandra Lal
Preceded by Aspy Engineer	Chief of the Air Staff (India); 1964–1969	Succeeded by Pratap Chandra Lal
Preceded by General Jayanto Nath Chaudhuri	Chairman of the Chiefs of Staff Committee; 1966–1969	Succeeded by Admiral Adhar Kumar Chatterji
Diplomatic posts
Preceded by M A Hussain	Ambassador of India to Switzerland, The Holy See & Liechtenstein; 1971–1974	Succeeded by Avtar Singh
Preceded by K C Nair	High Commissioner of India to the Republic of Kenya; 1974–1977	Succeeded by A. N. D. Haksar
Political offices
Preceded by Romesh Bhandari	Lieutenant Governor of Delhi; 1989–1990	Succeeded by Markandey Singh
