= Marshal of the Indian Air Force =

Highest military rank of the Indian Air Force

Marshal of the Air Force
- Marshal of the IAF rank flag

- Shoulder Board

- Rank Insignia of a Marshal of the Indian Air Force
- Country: India
- Service branch: Indian Air Force
- Abbreviation: MIAF
- Rank: Five-star rank
- NATO rank code: OF-10
- Next higher rank: None
- Next lower rank: Air Chief Marshal
- Equivalent ranks: Field Marshal (Indian Army); Admiral of the fleet (Indian Navy)

Marshal of the Indian Air Force (MIAF) is a five star rank and the highest attainable rank in the Indian Air Force. It is a ceremonial or wartime rank, having been awarded only once.

Marshal of the Air Force is ranked immediately above Air Chief Marshal. Marshal of the Air Force Arjan Singh, DFC is the only Officer to have held this rank.

Marshal of the Air Force is equivalent to Field Marshal in the Indian Army and admiral of the fleet in the Indian Navy. While the rank of admiral of the fleet has never been awarded, there have been two Field Marshals - Sam Manekshaw and K M Cariappa.

== Overview ==
A Marshal of the Air Force receives the full pay of a four–star service chief, and is considered a serving officer until their death. They wear a full uniform on all ceremonial occasions. In addition to this, they also run an office with a secretariat.

== Rank holder ==
=== Arjan Singh ===
MIAF Arjan Singh, DFC (15 April 1919 – 16 September 2017) was the first and only Officer to be promoted to the five star rank of Marshal of the Air Force. He served as the 3rd Chief of the Air Staff from 1964 to 1969. In 1966, he became the first IAF officer to be promoted to Air Chief Marshal. For his distinguished service in commanding the IAF during the Indo-Pakistani War of 1965, he was awarded the Padma Vibhushan. After retiring from the Indian Air Force, he served as a diplomat, politician and advisor to the Government of India. He was Lieutenant Governor of Delhi from 1989 to 1990.

He was conferred with the rank of the Marshal of the Air Force in a ceremony at the Rashtrapati Bhavan by the then President of India, K. R. Narayanan in 2002.

== Insignia ==
The badges of rank consist of four sky blue bands (each on a slightly wider navy blue band) over a sky blue band on a navy blue broad band.

A Marshal of the Indian Air Force wears gorget patches which are blue patches with five white stars.

In addition to this, the Blue Grey terrywool tunic has five sleeve stripes consisting of a broad band with four narrower bands.

A Marshal carries a gold-tipped baton on formal occasions.

Marshal of the IAF shoulder board

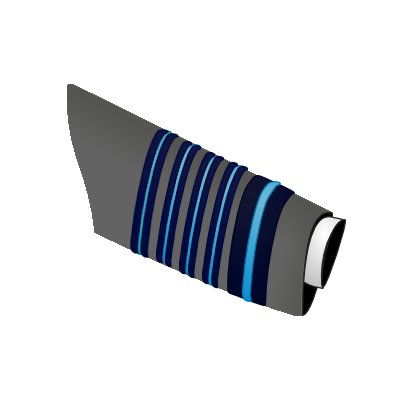
Marshal of the IAF sleeve

Marshal of the IAF command flag

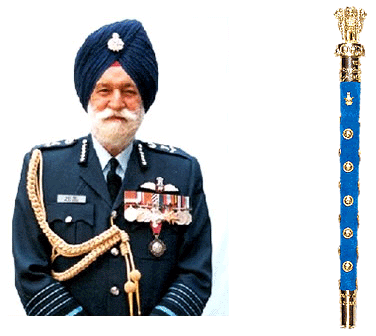
Marshal of the IAF's baton

== See also ==
- Air Force ranks and insignia of India
- Marshal of the air force
- Field Marshal
- Five-star rank
