= Field marshal (India) =

Highest Military rank of the Indian Army

Field Marshal
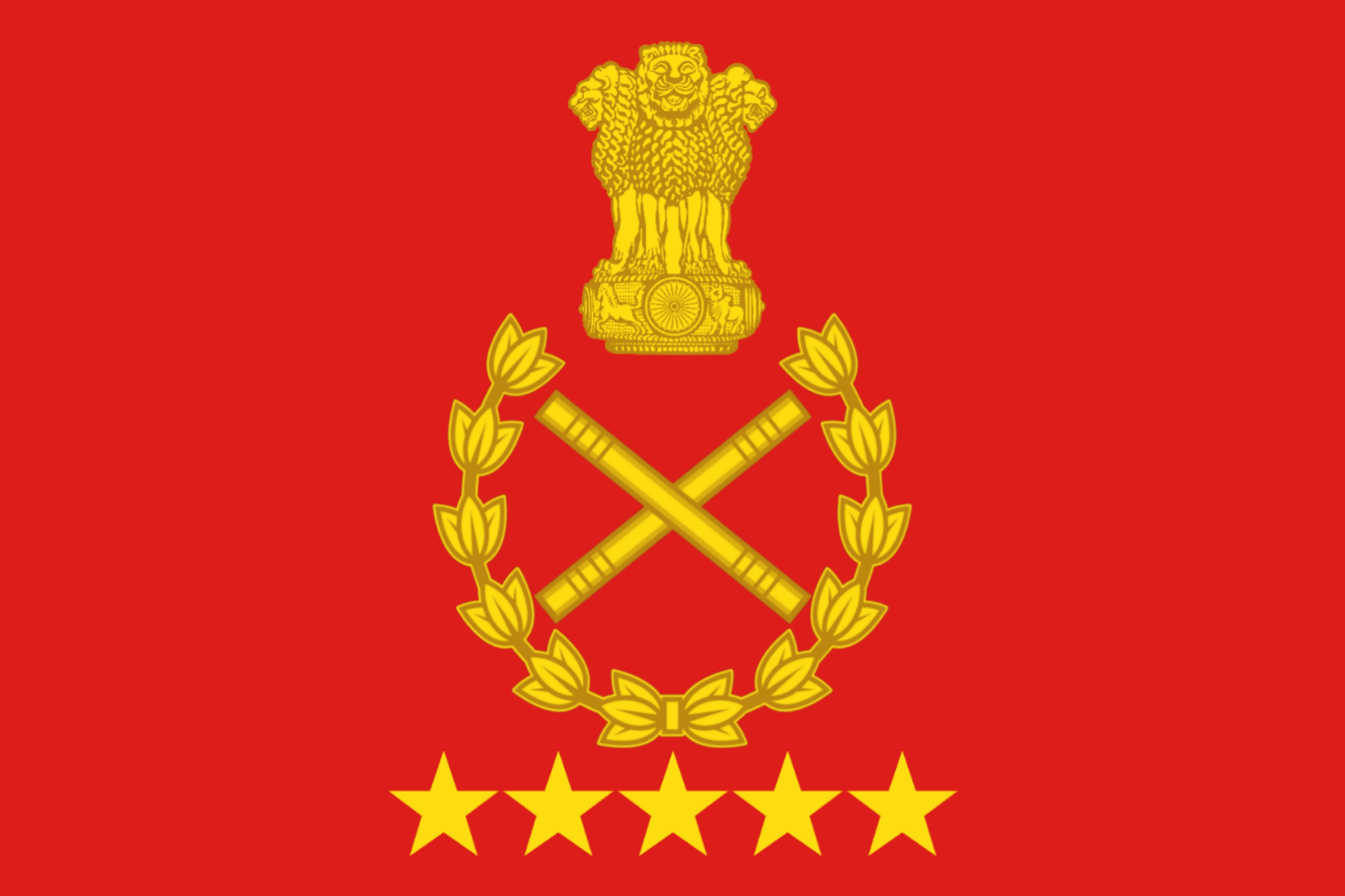
- Rank flag of the Field Marshal

- Shoulder epaulette

- Star insignia of the Field Marshal
- Country: India
- Service branch: Indian Army
- Abbreviation: FM
- Rank: Five star
- NATO rank code: OF-10
- Formation: 3 January 1973
- Next higher rank: None
- Next lower rank: General
- Equivalent ranks: Marshal of the Indian Air Force (IAF); Admiral of the fleet (Indian Navy)

Field Marshal (Hindi: फ़ील्ड मार्शल, romanized: pheeld maarshal) is a five–star officer rank and the highest attainable in the Indian Army. Created in 1973, it exists as a ceremonial recognition, awarded exclusively to officers deemed to have rendered exceptional service during wartime.

Modeled after British military ranking system, the rank is the Army's equivalent to the Marshal of the Indian Air Force (MIAF) and the Admiral of the Fleet (Indian Navy). It presently exists solely for honorary purposes and does not encompass any operational obligations, consequently, it sits outside the Army's operational hierarchy, nevertheless, its rank-holders customarily retain it for life i.e., are considered to be serving officers unto death.

Since its inception, the rank has been awarded only twice, to S. H. F. J. Manekshaw in January 1973 and second, to K. M. Cariappa in April 1986. Outside the Army, the only other officer in the armed forces to have ever held a five-star rank was Arjan Singh, who was promoted as Marshal of the Indian Air Force in January 2002.

== History ==
=== Preceding era ===
During the British Raj, the rank structure of the erstwhile British Indian Army (BIA) was modeled after the British ranking system, and upon India's attainment independence in 1947, the Indian Army, which succeeded the BIA, retained the rank structure with several modifications to its insignia; however, given that no officer in the BIA had ever been promoted to the rank of field marshal, the rank was also omitted from the Indian Army's rank structure. Consequently, the four-star rank of general existed as the highest attainable rank, and remained so until 1973.

=== S. H. F. J. Manekshaw (1973) ===
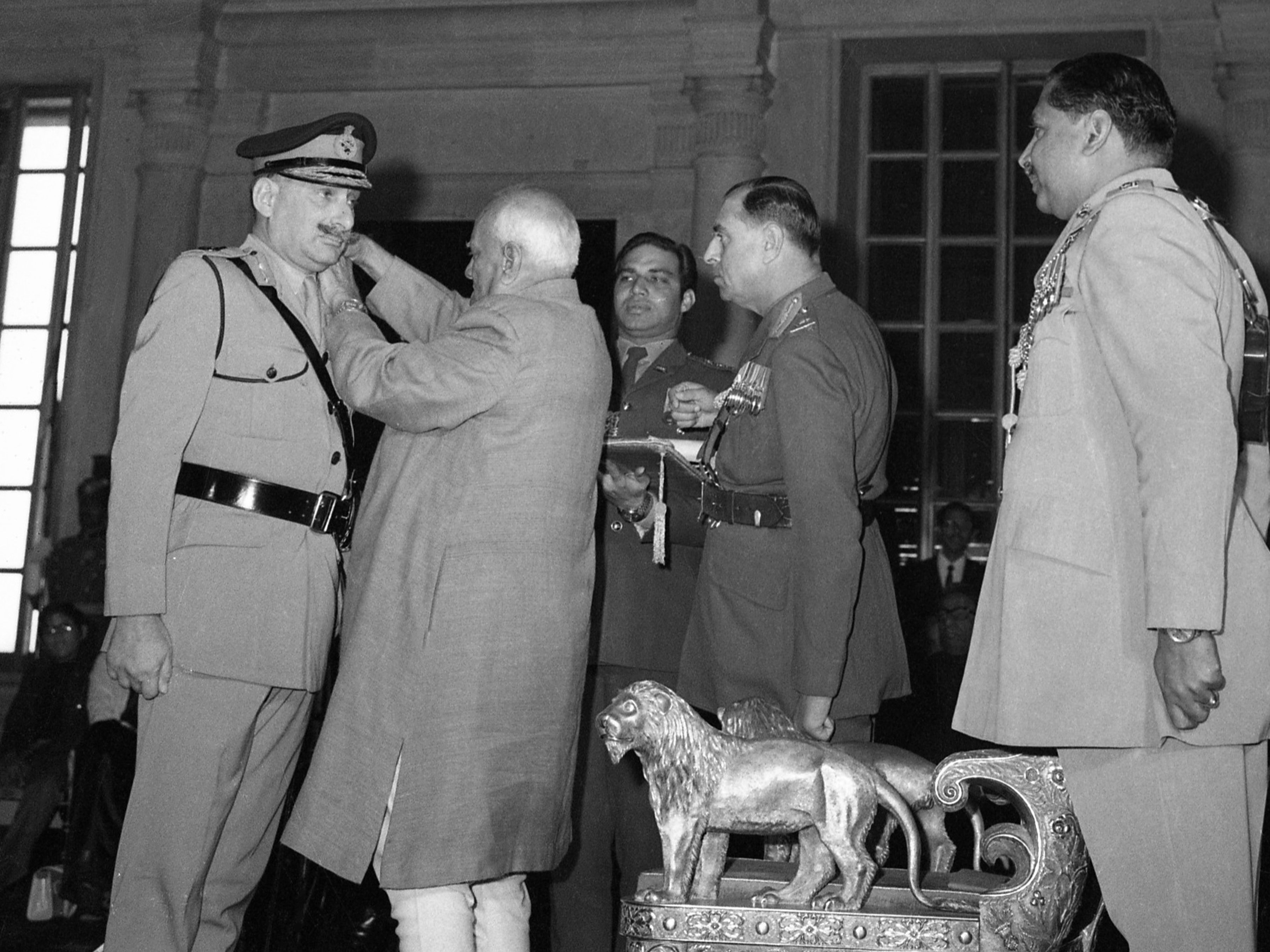
President V. V. Giri presenting the rank of Field Marshal to S. H. F. J. Manekshaw in January 1973

The idea to introduce the rank of field marshal was first proposed by the Union Government in early-1972, just a few months after India's military victory in the 1971 Indo-Pakistani war. At the time, the Army's successes came to be strongly identified with General S. H. F. J. Manekshaw, who for his part, had been a principal commander during the conflict vis-à-vis his leadership as the then-Chief of the Army Staff (COAS) and Chairman Chiefs of Staff Committee. Thus, it was conceived that Manekshaw's wartime leadership merited a promotion to the rank of field marshal, a notion which was then strongly supported by then-prime minister Indira Gandhi. However, the measure was reportedly opposed by then-defence minister Jagjivan Ram and the civilian bureaucracy, which feared an unbalanced tilt in civil-military relations. Consequently, the question regarding the rank's creation remained in limbo until 31 December 1972, when the government decided in favor of Manekshaw's promotion. Manekshaw thus became the first officer in the history of the armed forces to be promoted to a five-star rank, and was formally accorded the honor in a special investiture ceremony at the Rashtrapati Bhavan on 3 January 1973, where President V. V. Giri - the supreme commander of the armed forces, presented him with a baton and a special set of rank epaulettes.

=== K. M. Cariappa (1986) ===
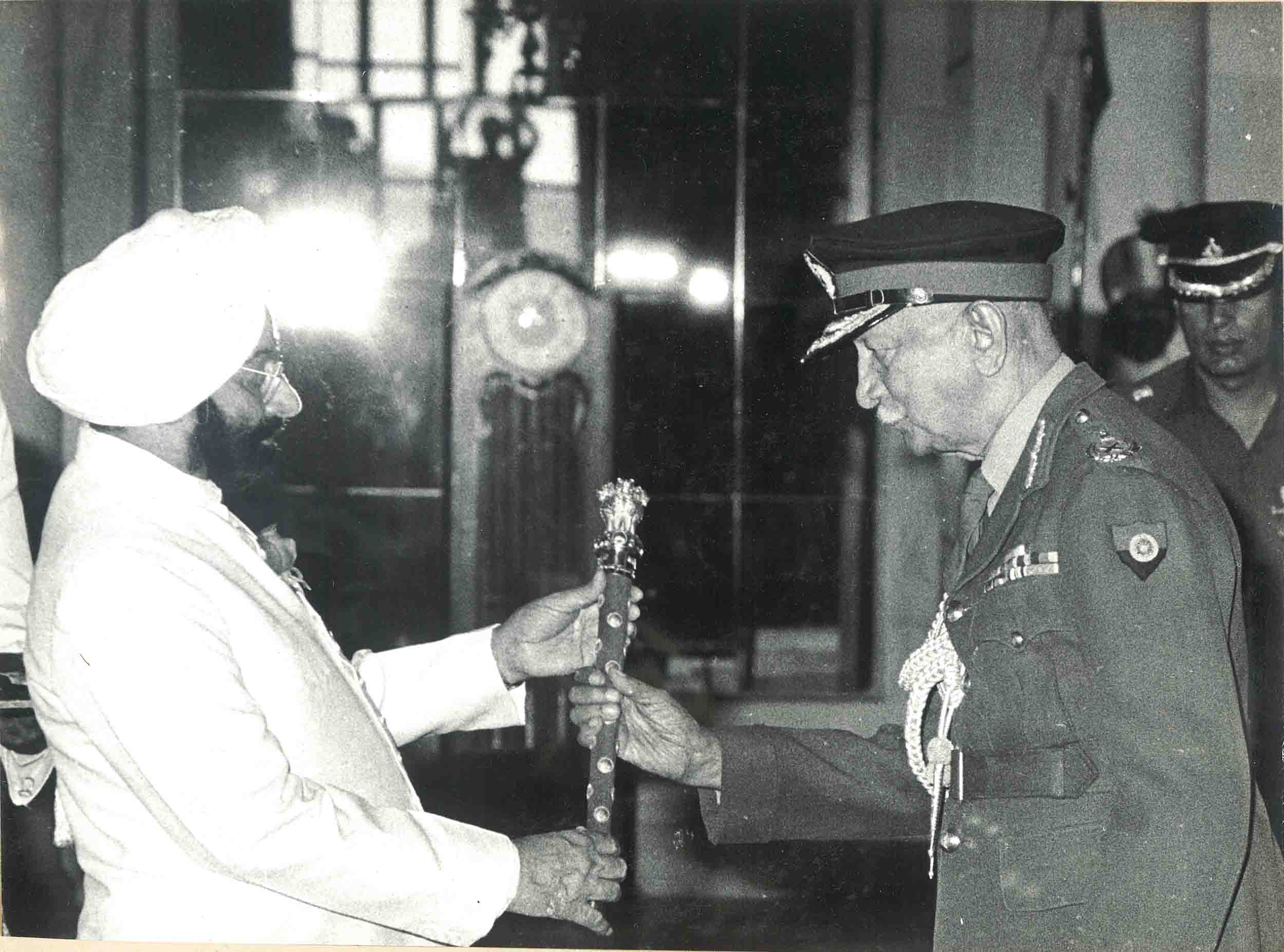
President Zail Singh presenting the rank of Field Marshal to K. M. Cariappa in April 1986.

Subsequently, Manekshaw remained the only officer to hold the distinction until 1986, when the Union Government of India under prime minister Rajiv Gandhi decided to promote retired general K. M. Cariappa. Similar to Manekshaw's service, Cariappa had also been a wartime officer: he had participated in the 1947-1948 Indo-Pakistani war, and had risen to become the first-ever Indian officer to lead the Army as its Commander-in-Chief (the predecessor office to COAS) at the four-star rank of general. Notably, unlike Manekshaw - who had been promoted while in service, Cariappa was a retired officer - having superannuated in 1953. Subsequently, Cariappa was accorded the honor of an honorary field marshal by President Zail Singh at a special investiture ceremony at the Rashtrapati Bhavan on 28 April 1986. However, at the time of Cariappa's promotion, the Ministry of Defence had categorized his accordance as an honorary field marshal, which created confusion as to the difference between an honorary and a substantive field marshal. The confusion was resolved in 1987 when the title honorary was dropped, allowing Cariappa to retain his rank substantively.

== Overview ==
=== Decorations ===
Since the Indian Army's ranking system was modeled after the British Army, the rank insignia of field marshal for both services draw visual similarities. The shoulder epaulette insignia for the Indian Army consists of two crossed batons surrounded by an oak wreath, with the Ashoka Lion placed above the wreath. Although it is usually prepared in metal gold furnishing, Manekshaw personally requested his rank insignia to be prepared in black metal, as he belonged to the Gorkhas, whose officers customarily wore their insignia in black. Cariappa, on the other hand, received his insignia in gold.

In addition to the shoulder epaulette, a field marshal is also accorded a ceremonial baton. Initially, Manekshaw was accorded a simple black cane adorned with an elaborate silver chain with the Ashoka Lion mounted atop. Later, both he and Cariappa were provided with one of standard design, consisting of a thick red-velvet handle studded with gold furnishings of the Ashoka Chakra and the Ashoka Lion perched atop. Field marshals customarily salute by raising their batons in their right hand, instead of providing the open-palm salute.

== List of field marshals ==
| No. | Portrait | Name | Regiment | Date of promotion | Offices held | Notes |
|---|---|---|---|---|---|---|
| 1 | | Sam Hormusji Framji Jamshedji Manekshaw; MC | 8th Gorkha Rifles | 03 January 1973 | Chief of the Army Staff (1969–1973) | Awarded in service for exceptional wartime leadership during the 1971 Indo-Pakistani War. |
| 2 | | Kodandera Madappa Cariappa; OBE | 7th Rajput Regiment | 28 April 1986 | Commander-in-Chief (1949–1953) | Awarded in retirement as honorary recognition for services rendered during the 1947-1948 Indo-Pakistani War |

== See also ==
=== Similar ===
- Marshal of the Indian Air Force
- Five-star rank

=== Related to the armed forces ===
- Chief of the Army Staff

== Bibliography ==
- Singh, Depinder (2002), Field Marshal Sam Manekshaw, M.C.: Soldiering with Dignity, Natraj, ISBN 978-81-85019-02-4
- Singh, Vijay Kumar (2005), Leadership in the Indian Army: Biographies of Twelve Soldiers, Sage, ISBN 978-0-7619-3322-9
- Sharma, Satinder (2007), Services Chiefs of India, Northern Book Centre, ISBN 978-81-7211-162-5
