= Air chief marshal (India) =

Air officer rank in the Indian Air Force

Air Chief Marshal
- Flag of an Air Chief Marshal

- Shoulder Board

- Rank Insignia of an Air Chief Marshal
- Country: India
- Service branch: Indian Air Force
- Abbreviation: ACM
- Rank: Four-star rank
- Next higher rank: Marshal of the Indian Air Force
- Next lower rank: Air marshal
- Equivalent ranks: General (Army); Admiral (Navy)

Air Chief Marshal is a four-star air officer rank in the Indian Air Force. It is the highest active rank in the Indian Air Force. Air Chief Marshal ranks above the three-star rank of air marshal and below the five-star rank of Marshal of the Indian Air Force, which is largely a war-time or ceremonial rank.

The rank is held by the Chief of the Air Staff, the professional head of the Indian Air Force. The rank may also be held by the Chief of Defence Staff when the holder is a serving Indian Air Force officer.

== Rank holders ==
The current and only air chief marshal in the Indian Armed Forces is the Chief of the Air Staff (CAS). The equivalent rank in the Indian Army is general and in the Indian Navy is admiral.

Air Chief Marshal Ashutosh Dixit in uniform

== History ==
The Indian Air Force inherited the rank of air chief marshal from the RAF. While the RAF air officers in command of RAF India were normally of a lower rank, Sir Edgar Ludlow-Hewitt was promoted to the rank in 1937, towards the end of his tenure as Air Officer Commanding RAF India. Additionally, at the height of World War II, Sir Richard Peirse, the Air Officer Commanding-in-Chief of RAF India was also promoted to the rank.

After India gained independence, the Royal Indian Air Force and then Indian Air Force, continued to use the rank on paper. The rank of the Chief of the Air Staff was upgraded from air marshal to Air Chief Marshal in 1966. The first IAF officer to hold this rank was Air Chief Marshal Arjan Singh (later promoted to the five-star rank of marshal of the Indian Air Force) who was promoted to the rank in 1966 while he served as the Chief of the Air Staff. Post 1966, all the air chiefs have held the rank.

== Insignia ==
The flag of an Air chief marshal is sky blue with the national flag in the canton, the roundel in lower fly, and the Indian Air Force badge in upper fly. The badges of rank consist of three sky blue bands (each on a slightly wider navy blue band) over a sky blue band on a navy blue broad band. An air chief marshal wears gorget patches which are blue patches with four white stars and additional oak leaves under them. In addition to this, the blue grey terrywool tunic has four sleeve stripes consisting of a broad band with three narrower bands.

== Appointment and term length ==
Appointments to the office of Chief of the Air Staff are made by the Appointments Committee of the Cabinet, which is chaired by the Prime Minister of India.

The term length of the Chief of the Air Staff is three years or until the age of 62 of the holder, whichever is earlier.

== Order of precedence ==
An air chief marshal ranks at number 12 on the Indian order of precedence, along with the CDS and the chiefs of staff of the Indian Army and Indian Navy (the COAS and the CNS). An air chief marshal is at pay level 18, equivalent to Cabinet Secretary of India (at number 11 on the warrant of precedence), with a monthly pay of ₹250,000 (US$3,500).

== See also ==
- Chief of the Air Staff
- List of serving air marshals of the Indian Air Force
- Air Force ranks and insignia of India
