= Indian Army ranks and insignia =

The Indian Army, the land component of the Indian Armed Forces, follows a certain hierarchy of rank designations and insignia derived from the erstwhile British Indian Army (BIA).

== History ==
The Indian Army Ensign.

=== 1947–1950 ===
Upon the establishment of India's independence in 1947, the country became a dominion within the British Commonwealth of Nations. Nevertheless, the armed forces, namely, the British Indian Army (BIA), the Royal Indian Navy (RIN) and the Royal Indian Air Force (RIAF) - under the helm of King George VI as the Commander-in-Chief - retained their respective pre-independence ranks and corresponding insignia. In the Army's case, the service retained its pre-independence insignia, comprising the Tudor Crown and four-pointed Bath Star, called the pip.

=== 1950–present ===
In May 1949, Lord Mountbatten, the inaugural Governor-General of India, dispatched a note to Prime Minister Jawaharlal Nehru, titled Names and Insignia of Indian Armed Forces, containing a list of suggestions regarding the nomenclature of the armed forces that were to be enforced upon the dominion's conversion to a republic. In the note, Mountbatten proposed that the Tudor Crown, worn on the epaulettes of ranks of Majors and above should be replaced by the Lion Capital of Ashoka and that the pip should be replaced by the Star of India or another form of star.

In September 1949, Nehru forwarded the proposals to the country's minister of defence, Baldev Singh, recommending Mountbatten's suggestions, which were consequently enforced upon India's emergence as a republic on 26 January 1950. Simultaneously, the King's Commission, which was granted to commissioned Indian officers of the BIA was also changed to Indian Commission on the same date; and at a subsequent date the King's Colours of the various armed regiments were laid to rest at the Indian Military Academy (IMA), Dehradun.

== Structure ==
Presently, the Army's rank hierarchy is divided into three broad categories:
Group-A: Commissioned officers (Officers)
Group-B: Junior commissioned officers (JCO)
Group-C: Non-commissioned officers (NCO) and enlisted, also referred to as Other Ranks (OR)

Equivalent ranks of Indian military
Commission	Indian Navy	Indian Army	Indian Air Force
Commissioned	Admiral of the fleet	Field marshal	Marshal of the Indian Air Force
Commissioned	Admiral	General	Air chief marshal
Commissioned	Vice admiral	Lieutenant general	Air marshal
Commissioned	Rear admiral	Major general	Air vice marshal
Commissioned	Commodore	Brigadier	Air commodore
Commissioned	Captain	Colonel	Group captain
Commissioned	Commander	Lieutenant colonel	Wing commander
Commissioned	Lieutenant commander	Major	Squadron leader
Commissioned	Lieutenant	Captain	Flight lieutenant
Commissioned	Sub lieutenant	Lieutenant	Flying officer
Junior commissioned	Master chief petty officer 1st class	Subedar major (Note: Risaldar major in cavalry and armoured regiments)	Master warrant officer
Junior commissioned	Master chief petty officer 2nd class	Subedar (Note: Risaldar in cavalry and armoured regiments)	Warrant officer
Junior commissioned	Chief petty officer	Naib subedar (Note: Naib risaldar in cavalry and armoured regiments. Called jemadar until 1965.)	Junior warrant officer
Non-commissioned	Petty officer	Havildar/Daffadar	Sergeant
Non-commissioned	Leading seaman	Naik/Lance daffadar	Corporal
Non-commissioned	Seaman 1	Lance naik/Acting Lance-Daffadar	Leading aircraftsman
Non-commissioned	Seaman 2	Sepoy/Sowar	Aircraftsman

== Special ranks ==
Rank group
Chief of Defence Staff

== Commissioned Officers ==
Rank group	General / flag officers					Senior officers			Junior officers
Indian Army
Indian Army	Field marshal फील्ड मार्शल	General जनरल	Lieutenant general लेफ्टिनेंट जनरल	Major general मेजर जनरल	Brigadier ब्रिगेडियर	Colonel कर्नल	Lieutenant colonel लेफ्टिनेंट कर्नल	Major मेजर	Captain कैप्टन	Lieutenant लेफ्टिनेंट

The Army has ten commissioned officer (officer) ranks, which are designated as Group-A service ranks and are equivalent to the All India Services.

The highest attainable rank in the Army's officer cadre is that of the Field Marshal, a ceremonial five-star rank immediately superior to full General. It is awarded exclusively to deemed recipients for recognition of exceptional service and leadership during wartime; however, it does not feature in the Army's organizational structure. In the Army's history, only two four-star officers have ever been promoted to the rank: Gen. Sam Manekshaw in 1973 and Gen. K. M. Cariappa in 1986. Recipients are considered to be serving officers until their death. The highest operational rank is General, which is held exclusively by the Chief of the Army Staff (COAS). The first Indian to be promoted to the rank was then-Lt. Gen. K. M. Cariappa, following his appointment as the second Commander-in-Chief (C-in-C) of the Army in January 1949.

The Chief of Defence Staff (CDS), a rotational position deemed the highest uniformed designation-cum-professional head of the armed forces, is also held by a four-star officer drawn from the Army, the Navy or the Air Force. However, CDS appointees do not wear the corresponding insignia of their respective service, but are rather allotted a unique insignia independent of that service's rank hierarchy: a crimson-colored epaulette, adorned with the tri-service emblem of the armed forces. As of 2024, only two four-star officers from the Army have been appointed to the position.

== Junior commissioned officer and non-commissioned ranks ==
Rank group	Subordinate Officers (SO)			Non commissioned officers (NCO)			Enlisted
Indian Army							No insignia
Indian Army	Subedar-major सूबेदार मेजर	Subedar सूबेदार	Naib subedar नायब सूबेदार	Havildar हवलदार	Naik नायक	Lance naik लांस नायक	Sepoy सिपाही
Cavalry ranks	Risaldar Major रिसालदार मेजर	Risaldar रिसालदार	Naib Risaldar नायब रिसालदार	Daffadar दफ़ादार	Lance Daffadar लांस दफ़ादार	Acting Lance Daffadar एक्टिंग लांस दफ़ादार	Sowar सवार

- The title Risaldar replaces Subedar in ranks in cavalry, armored regiments, Remount Veterinary Corps, and animal transport battalions of Army Service Corps.
- Naib Risaldar was called Jemadar until 1965.
- Daffadar, Lance Daffadar and Acting Lance Daffadar - these ranks replace the titles of Havildar, Naik and Lance Naik in cavalry, armored regiments, Remount Veterinary Corps and animal transport battalions of Army Service Corps.
- Sowar replaces the rank Sepoy in cavalry, armored regiments, Remount Veterinary Corps, and animal transport battalions of the Army Service Corps.

== Former ranks ==
Former/Discontinued Ranks
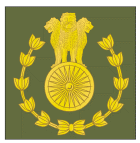
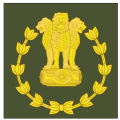
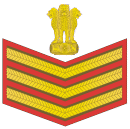
	Officers		Non-commissioned officers
Shoulder; Insignia		Arm
Rank	Second; Lieutenant		Regimental; Havildar; Major	Regimental; Quartermaster; Havildar	Company; Havildar; Major	Company; Quartermaster; Havildar

The rank of Second Lieutenant is no longer in use; all new officers are commissioned as Lieutenants. Notable past holders include 2nd Lt. Arun Khetarpal, 2nd Lt.Rama Raghoba Rane, and other ranks, including CHM Piru Singh Shekhawat and CQMH Abdul Hamid. The appointments of Regimental Quartermaster Havildar and Regimental Havildar Major are no longer used in the Indian Army (except for the Regiment of Artillery and Army Air Defence) and those duties are now performed by JCOs.

== Rank descriptions ==
- Indian Army Ranks can be classified into three categories.
  - Commissioned Officers who are equivalent to All India Services & Group "A" Service officers.
  - Junior Commissioned Officers who are equivalent to Group B Gazetted officers.
  - Other Ranks comprising non-commissioned officers and soldiers.

=== Officers ===
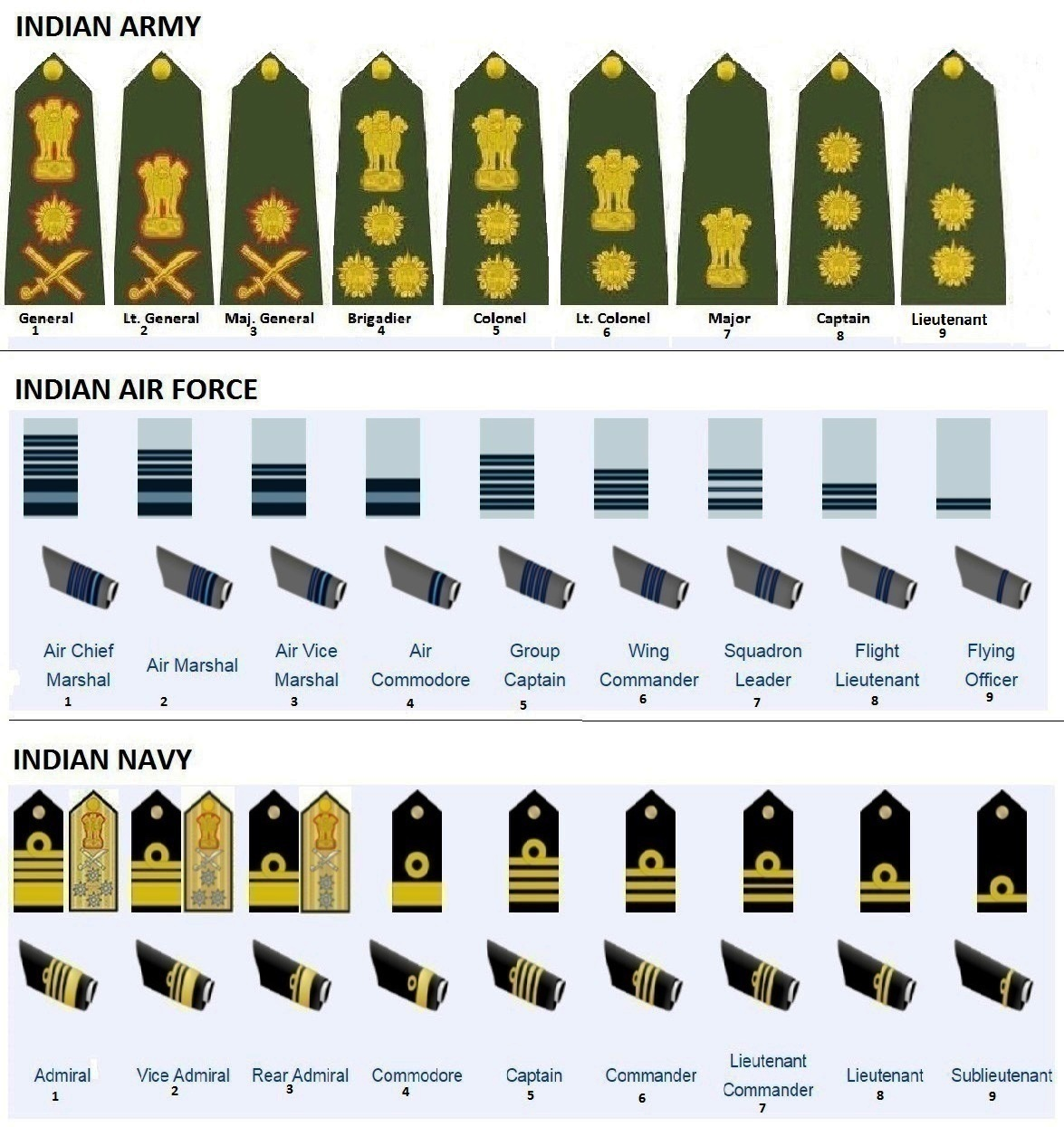
Equivalent ranks of Indian Armed Forces (click to enlarge)

Commissioned officers are the leaders of the army and command anywhere from a Platoon, a Company, a Battalion, a Brigade, a Division, a Corps, and the whole army. At the time of joining, all Indian Army officers are inducted as officer cadets. The rank of officer cadet is denoted by an officer's uniform with no insignia. Indian Army officers are continually put through different courses and assessed on merit throughout their career, for promotions and appointments. Substantive promotions up to Lieutenant Colonel or equivalent (subject to clearance of Part B and Part D exam for Major and Lieutenant Colonel) and are based on time in service whereas those for Colonel and above are based on selection, with promotion to Colonel also based on time served.

Due to steep hierarchy and few vacancies, most of the officers retire at the rank of Colonel and only a few make it to the rank of Brigadier and above. Civilian equivalents are in accordance with government policies on functional allocation of duties in staff billets; otherwise, the rank structure of the armed forces is different from that of civilians about years of service and vacancies available. Indian Army officers undergo various courses, such as the Young Officers Course, Junior Command Course, Defence Services Staff College course at DSSC Wellington, Management Development Programme: Senior Defence Management Course, Higher Defence Management Course at the College of Defence Management (Secunderabad), Higher Command Courses, and NDC courses at various premier institutions of the Armed Forces for promotions. The same applies to officers of the other two services, namely Indian Navy and Indian Air Force.

Rank	Epaulette Insignia	Description	Appointments	Superannuation Age/Tenure	Rank flag	Pay level
Field marshal (FM)		Five-star rank Awarded exclusively in recognition of exceptional service and leadership during wartime. Ceremonial, not included in the Army organizational hierarchy.	Appointed by order of the Government of India * S. H. F. J. Manekshaw - Promoted in 1973 * K. M. Cariappa - Promoted in 1986	Recipients are considered serving officers until the date of demise.		—N/a
General (Gen)		Four-star rank Highest ranking general officer in Army organizational hierarchy.	Chief of Defence Staff (CDS) (Only if appointee is an Army flag officer); Chief of the Army Staff (COAS)	CDS: 65 (or) 3 years of service; whichever is earlier. COAS: 62 (or) 3 years of service; whichever is earlier.	(COAS)	18 (apex)
Lieutenant general (Lt Gen)		Three-star rank Second-highest general officer in Army organizational hierarchy.	Chief of Integrated Defence Staff (CISC) (Only if appointee is an Army general officer) Vice Chief of the Army Staff (VCOAS); Principal Staff Officers (PSOs); General Officer Commanding-in-Chiefs - (GOC-in-C) of army commands e.g. Eastern Command; GOCs of Field corps General Staff; Heads of other directorates. Head of the Assam Rifles.	60	(VCOAS) (Lt Gen)	17/15
Major general (Maj Gen)		Two-star rank Third-highest general officer in Army organizational hierarchy.	General Officer Commanding (GOC) of Divisions Additional Director Generals Commandants/Director Generals of various institutions/organizations and other appointments.	58	Guidon in red, with army crest at the hoist, two stars at the fly	14
Brigadier (Brig)		One-star rank	Brigade Commander; Brigadier General Staff (BGS); Deputy Director Generals of directorates Diplomatic military attaché and other appointments	56	Triangular pennon in red, with army crest at the hoist, one star at the fly	13A
Colonel (Col)		(-)	Colonel General Staff (Col GS); Directors and other appointments CO of battalion/regiment / equivalent unit (Infantry, Artillery, Armored), appointment varies by corps/regiments	54	(-)	13
Lieutenant colonel (Lt Col)		(-)	Second in command of battalion/regiment / equivalent unit (Infantry, Artillery, Armored), appointment varies by corps/regiments	NA	(-)	12A
Major (Maj)		(-)	Company/equivalent unit commander, appointment varies by corps/regiments	NA	(-)	11
Captain (Capt)		(-)	Varies by corps/regiments	NA	(-)	10B
Lieutenant (Lt)		(-)	Varies by corps/regiments	NA	(-)	10
Officer Cadet (GC/LC)	NDA, IMA & OTA tag	Professional training at National Defence Academy (NDA), Indian Military Academy (IMA), Officers Training Academy (OTA).	Gentleman Cadet (GC); Lady Cadet (LC)	1 to 5 years	(-)	—N/a

In the Indian Army, officer cadets are known as Gentlemen Cadets or Lady Cadets. Gentlemen Cadets join the National Defence Academy (NDA), Indian Military Academy (IMA)/Officer's Training Academy (OTA) after going through the Service Selection Board (SSB) interview. Gentlemen Cadets undergo a pre-commission training program at NDA, IMA/OTA, which is equally divided into terms.

=== Junior commissioned officers ===
Junior commissioned officers are promoted from non-commissioned officers and are broadly equivalent to warrant officers in the British Army. Senior non-commissioned officers are promoted to JCO rank based on merit and seniority, restricted to the number of vacancies. In between the Commissioned Officers and the NCOs lie the Junior Commissioned Officers. They are treated with great respect as they have a minimum of 28 years and above and are referred to as Sahab by all ranks.

The current living recipients of the Param Veer Chakra are all from JCO ranks, namely Bana Singh Retd, Sanjay Kumar, and Yogendra Singh Yadav. JCOs are entrusted with supervisory roles, and the three JCO ranks are Subedar Major, Subedar, and Naib Subedar. JCOs are equivalent in status to Group B (Gazetted) of the Government of India. Junior commissioned officers are treated as a separate class and hold many additional privileges. In the army, they have a separate mess (the JCO's mess), get well-furnished family quarters, and are authorized to travel in AC II-tier on the railways.

Ranks and abbreviations		Insignia	Description	Retirement Age	Pay level
Infantry and other arms	Cavalry and Armour	Insignia	Description	Retirement Age	Pay level
Subedar Major (Sub Maj)	Risaldar Major (Ris Maj)		Golden national emblem with stripe	After 34 years service or at the age of 54, whichever is sooner.	8
Subedar (Sub)	Risaldar (Ris)		Two golden stars with stripe	After 30 years of service or at the age of 52, whichever is sooner.	7
Naib Subedar (Nb Sub)	Naib Risaldar (Nb Ris)		One golden star with stripe	After 28 years of service or at the age of 52, whichever is sooner.	6

JCOs are currently enrolled as jawans, and a few of them get promoted to officers over a period of time, based on their performance and on their ability to clear promotion examinations. A few JCOs are directly enrolled as religious teachers and in certain technical arms such as the Corps of Engineers. As of 2021, the Indian Army is discussing a proposal to directly enrol Junior Commissioned Officers (JCOs) in all arms of the service to address the shortage of commissioned officers. According to the proposal, the Indian Army will directly induct JCOs who have cleared the Services Selection Board (SSB) interview. The UPSC will conduct an entrance examination, which will be followed by an SSB interview and a medical examination. Selected candidates would then be trained for one and a half years before joining the units as JCOs. Subsequently, they would be promoted to officers up to the rank of Colonel based on their length of service and qualifications.

=== Other ranks ===
Other ranks in the Indian Army include Non-commissioned officers ("NCOs") and Soldiers ("sepoys" or "jawans")

==== Non-commissioned officers ====
NCOs are soldiers promoted to positions of responsibility and are equivalent to junior non-commissioned officers (sergeants and corporals) in Western armies.

Ranks and abbreviations		Insignia	Description	Retirement Age	Pay level
Infantry and other arms	Cavalry and armour	Insignia	Description	Retirement Age	Pay level
Havildar (Hav)	Daffadar (Dfr)		Three chevrons	After 26 years of service or at the age of 49, whichever is sooner.	5
Naik (Nk)	Lance Daffadar (L/Dfr)		Two chevrons	After 23 years of service or at the age of 49, whichever is sooner.	4
Lance Naik (L/Nk)	Acting Lance Daffadar (ALD)		One chevron	After 19 years of service or at the age of 48, whichever is sooner.	3

==== Soldiers ====
Ranks		Insignia	Retirement Age	
Infantry and other arms	Cavalry and armour	Insignia	Retirement Age	Pay level
Sepoy	Sowar	No insignia	After 15 years, 56 Days' service or at the age of 42, whichever is sooner.	3

A sepoy or sowar is a rank equivalent to Private in most Commonwealth armies. Many regiments and corps use other distinctive and descriptive names instead of sepoys. These distinctive equivalents for Sepoy include:

Corps	Designation	Abbreviation
Army Air Defence and Regiment of Artillery	Gunner	Gnr
Rifle regiments	Rifleman	Rfn
Parachute Regiment	Paratrooper	Ptr
Grenadiers	Grenadier	Gdr
Brigade of the Guards	Guardsman	Gdsmn
Corps of Engineers	Sapper	Spr
Corps of Electronics and Mechanical Engineers	Craftsman	Cfn
Corps of Signals	Signalman	Sigmn

== Honorary ranks ==
=== Brevet ===
Honorary ranks and honors, also called brevet, are granted in the Indian Army and its branches such as India Territorial Army (TA), for various reasons. These ranks may not entitle the rank holder to pay, pension, or perks (e.g., ranks given to celebrities).

==== Retiring Soldiers ====
Since the time of the British Raj, exemplary soldiers who are about to retire are given honorary ranks, usually a few days before their retirement, although these ranks can be granted at any time. Examples include the grant of the rank of Field Marshal, which is rarely granted. Most frequently, honorary ranks that are granted are those of junior commissioned officers, which are granted 1 or 2 weeks before retirement.

==== Prominent citizens as brand ambassadors ====
In order to inspire Indian youths to join the Indian Army and to acknowledge contributions towards the nation, honorary ranks are awarded to the accomplished and eminent personalities who act as brand ambassadors for the defence forces. The following were awarded honorary titles:

- Indian Army's Territorial Army (TA)
  - Kapil Dev, 2008, Lieutenant Colonel, TA, (Punjab Regiment) cricketer
  - Mohanlal Viswanathan, 2009, Lieutenant Colonel, TA, (Madras Regiment), Mollywood actor and filmmaker
  - Mahendra Singh Dhoni, 2011, Lieutenant Colonel, TA, (Parachute Regiment), cricketer
  - Abhinav Bindra, 2011, Lieutenant Colonel, TA, (Sikh Regiment), sports shooter and politician
  - Neeraj Chopra, 2025, Lieutenant Colonel, (Rajputana Rifles)
  - Deepak Rao, 2011, Major, TA, (Parachute Regiment), military trainer and author
  - Nana Patekar, 1990–2013, Lieutenant Colonel, TA, (Maratha Light Infantry), Bollywood actor

==== Foreign trainees at India's military academies ====
Trainees of foreign nations who are trained by the military academies of India, such as the National Defence Academy (NDA) or the Indian Military Academy (IMA), are sometimes awarded honorary ranks in the Indian Army. The trainees are usually from friendly foreign nations, such as the Singapore Army and the Royal Bhutan Army.

=== Reciprocal awarding of honorary ranks to other nations ===
==== Nepal ====
Since 1950, when former Indian Army Chief General K. M. Cariappa visited Nepal, awarding the highest reciprocal honorary ranks to the newly appointed serving chiefs of each other's armies is a practice followed by India and Nepal. For example, in 2009 the newly appointed Nepal Army Chief General Chhatra Man Singh Gurung was decorated with the honorary rank of General of the Indian army at Rashtrapati Bhavan in New Delhi by the President of India who is also the Supreme Commander of Indian Army. Similarly, in 2010, the newly appointed Indian Army Chief General V. K. Singh was awarded the honorary rank of General of Nepal Army at Shital Niwas in Kathmandu by the President of Nepal who is also the Supreme Commander of Nepal Army.

==== British Colonial era: Indian Army ranks to British Army ====
Some members of the ruling families of Princely states were given ceremonial honorary ranks during the colonial era. An 1832 journal reports that during the colonial British Raj era, the Commander-in-Chief of British Army (ex officio role of the serving Monarch of Britain) promulgated an order directing that the Lieutenant Colonel of H.M. (British Royal Army) cannot be superseded by the East India Company's Indian Army's Lieutenant Colonel. Whenever an Indian Army Lieutenant Colonel was promoted to Colonel, all the British Army's Lieutenant Colonels who were deployed with the Indian Army and had the same date and rank as the newly appointed Colonel of the Indian Army were also mandatorily given the local Indian Army's honorary rank of Colonel from the date of their Lieutenant Colonelcy with the British Army. This unfair system preserved the fictional equivalency of British Army officers with Indian Army officers while denying the officers of the Indian Army their hard-earned honours and ranks within their peculiar service.

This was not a reciprocal system, i.e., Lieutenant Colonels of the East India Company (EIC) (Indian Army) were not promoted to Colonel's rank when a British Army Lieutenant Colonel of equal date and rank was promoted to Colonel's rank in the Indian Army. For example, when a ranked Lieutenant Colonel of Bengal Army was promoted to Colonel he was ranked 34th on the general list, he superseded 33 other Lieutenant Colonels of Indian Army, along with him all of the British Army's Lieutenant Colonel serving with the Bengal Presidency were also given the honorary rank of Colonel of Bengal Presidency and they superseded 33 Lieutenant Colonels of Indian Army who were their seniors. The army officers of the EIC appealed against this derogatory and non-reciprocal system in the EIC's Court of Directors. EIC directors had no authority to revoke or amend the order issued by the British monarch.

== Retired officers: form of address ==
On 21 July 2014, the Indian Army issued a circular for retired personnel informing them that the correct form of addressing a retired officer is "Rank ABC (Retd) and not Rank (Retd) ABC", a correct example is: "Brigadier Sant Singh (Retd)". The stated rationale of the army was, "Rank never retires; it is an officer who retires." This form of address applies to both living and deceased officers.

== See also ==
- Comparative military ranks
- Indian Army cap badges
- Indian Navy ranks and insignia
- Indian Air Force ranks and insignia
- Coast Guard ranks and insignia of India
- Border Roads Organisation ranks and insignia of India
- Paramilitary forces ranks and insignia of India
- Police ranks and insignia of India
- Uniforms of the Indian Armed Forces
