= Uniforms of the Indian Armed Forces =

Military uniforms

The uniforms of the Indian Armed Forces currently exist in more than ten categories, ranging from ceremonial uniforms to combat uniforms. While uniforms in the Indian Army are specific to the regiment (or corps) to which a soldier or officer belongs, following the British Army tradition. The uniforms in the Indian Army show significant differentiation between units and also show regimental distinction.

General officers, i.e. Brigadier rank officers and above in the army, do not wear a regimental uniform (except when serving in the honorary position of — Colonel of the Regiment); rather, they wear their own service uniform.

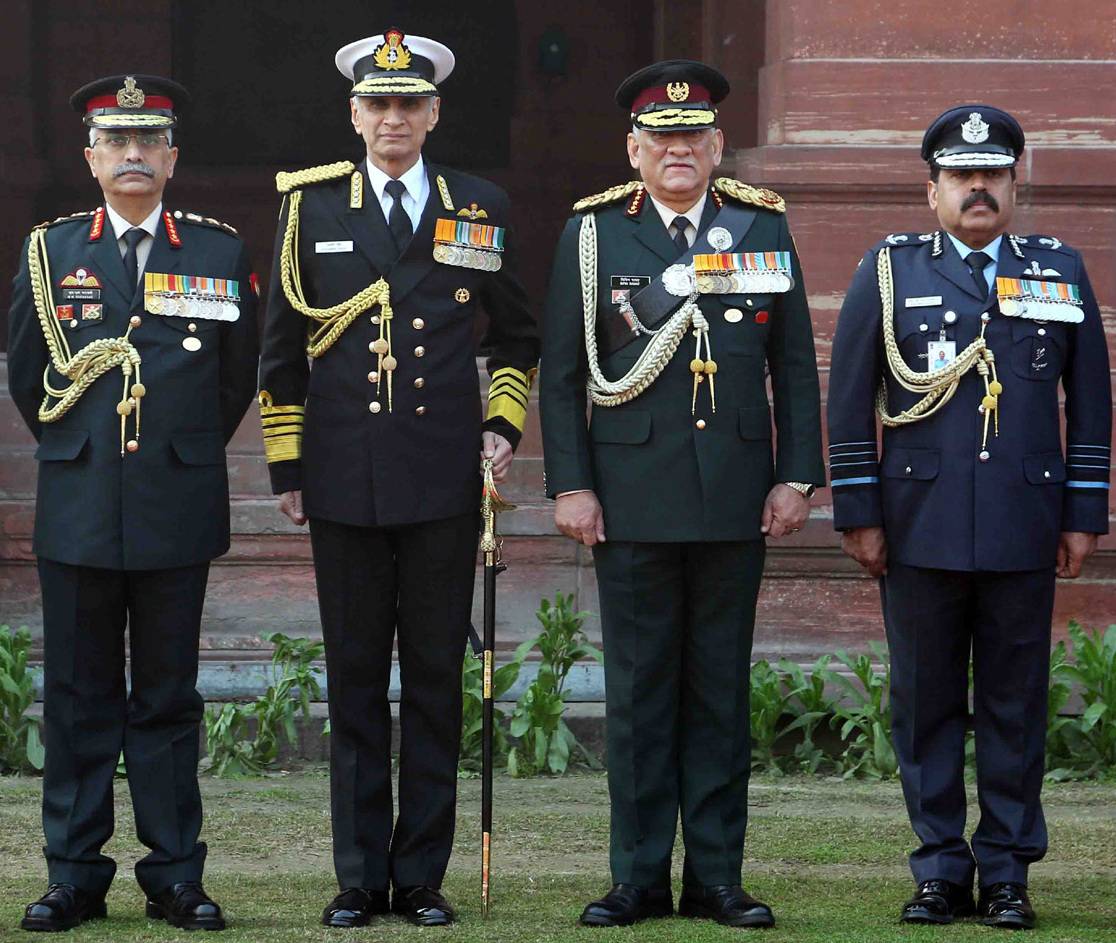
The uniforms of the Indian Armed Forces are largely influenced by British military traditions. In the picture, the uniforms of two serving Generals — General M. M. Naravane (COAS) (1 from Left) and General Bipin Rawat (CDS) (3) — can be seen, alongside Admiral Karambir Singh (CNS) (2) and Air Chief Marshal R. K. S. Bhadauria (CAS) (4)

== Indian Army ==
=== Ceremonial uniforms ===
==== Indian Army Ceremonial Dress (No.2) ====
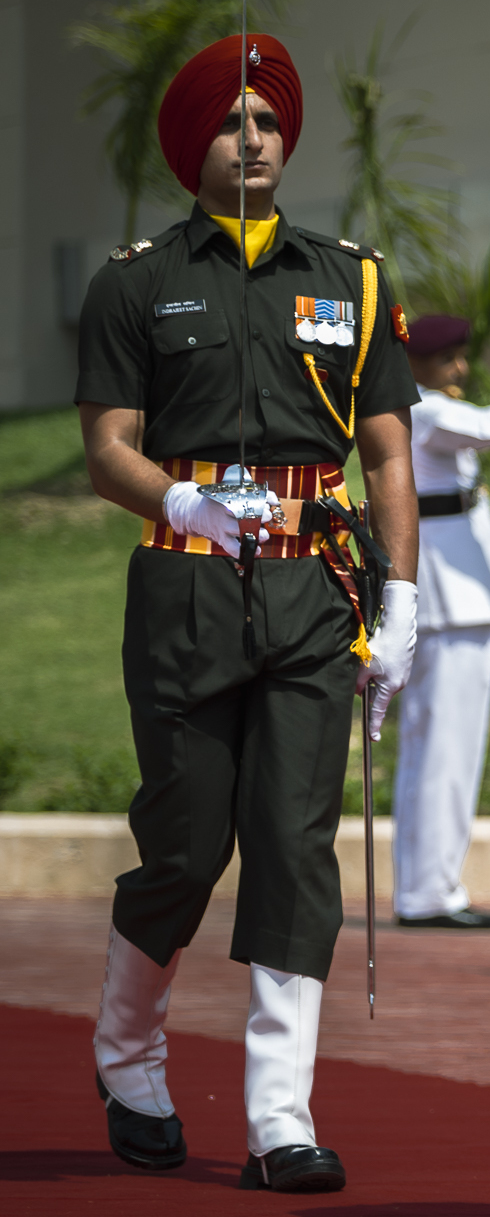
A Sikh officer from the Sikh Regiment wearing No.2 Summer ceremonial dress as the Honor Guard

The Indian Army No. 2 Ceremonial Dress (Summer) is worn by officers or PBORs during parades and formal state functions. It features the following elements:

- Olive green tunic and trousers
  - It is the standard for the Indian Army's ceremonial uniforms.
- Scarlet Turban
  - Turbans are authorised to be worn only by Sikh personnel.
- Medals
  - Full-sized medal(s) to be displayed on the left chest, signifying honours and awards.
- Sam Browne Belt
  - It is a distinctive cross belt worn by commissioned officers.
- Sword
  - Carried during formal parades or state functions such as passing out parades of IMA or state visits of Presidents of foreign nations.
- White gloves
  - It is the standard for ceremonial protocol.
- Lanyard
  - It usually indicates regimental affiliation or corps.

==== Military Police ====
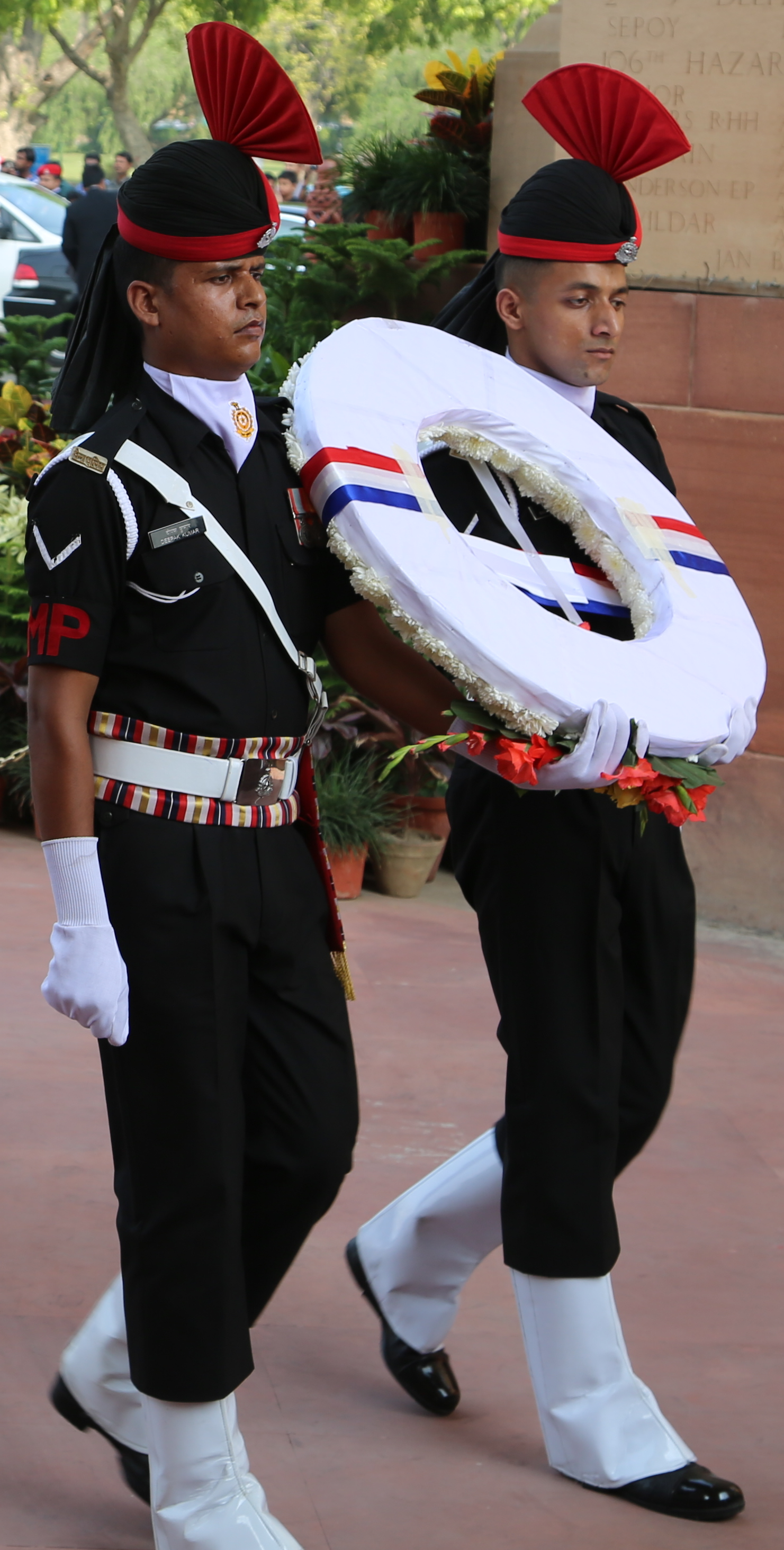
Military policemen from Corps of Military Police wearing Ceremonial uniform

==== Ceremonial uniform (Armoured Corps) ====
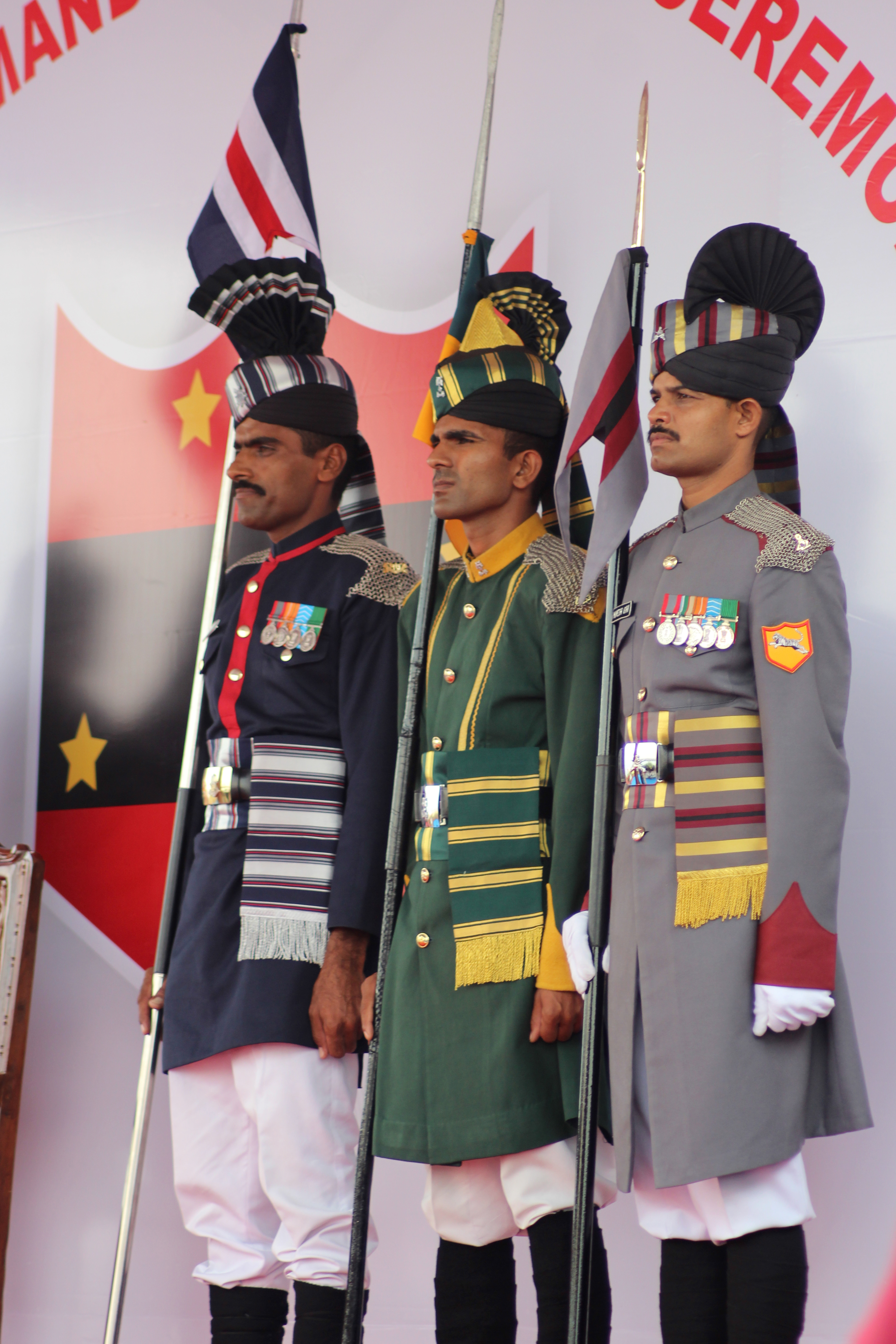
Soldiers of armoured corps in Ceremonial uniform

The ceremonial uniform of the Indian Army Armoured Corps, is distinct from the regular ceremonial uniform; it is worn by personnel from cavalry and tank regiments during state functions, parades and other formal ceremonies.

- Tunics and Trousers
  - Varies by regiment, often royal blue, bottle green, grey, scarlet etc. This style is derived from the British Indian Army, representing pre-independence cavalry uniforms.
- Headgear
  - Distinct pagris or plumed headgear with elaborate regiment patterns and colours.
- Sashes and Belts
  - Multi-stripped silk cummerbands and waistbands, unique to each regiment.
- Shoulder Insignia
  - Metallic or chain-mail shoulder pieces, ornate and traditional
- Shoes
  - Jodhpurs with long black riding boots or puttees
- Weapons
  - Lances and ceremonial swords, linked to mounted cavalry traditions.

=== Service Uniforms ===
==== General Duty Winter Dress (No. 3 Dress – Officers) ====
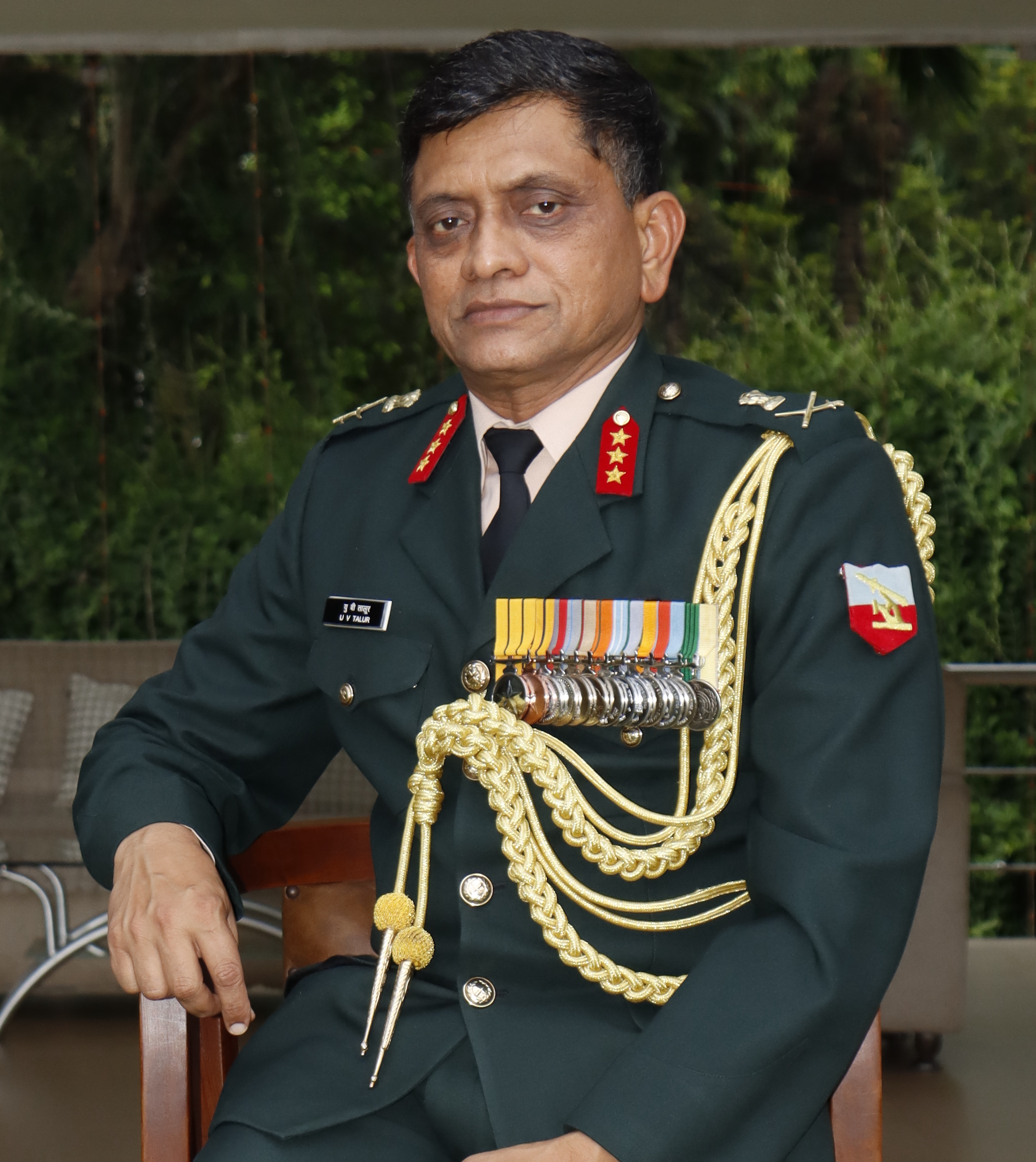
Lt Gen U.V. Talur in Winter General Duty (No. 3) uniform

The Indian Army No. 3 General Duty Winter Dress is a formal uniform worn by officers for day-to-day official duties, inspections, and semi-formal functions during the winter season.

It features the following elements:

- Material
  - The uniform is made of Terry-wool, providing warmth and durability in colder weather.
- Colour
  - Dark Green OCM shade No. 1, which is the standard winter shade for Indian Army uniforms.
- Jacket (Blazer)
  - Design: Single-breasted, cut like a lounge coat with a back seam. It is loose at the chest and shoulders, fitted at the waist, and cut straight in the front.
  - Collars: Stiff collars with a depth of about 8 cm.
- Pockets
  - Two breast plain-patch pockets – 13 cm wide and 16 cm deep, with pointed flaps (14 cm long, 3 cm depth on the sides, and 6 cm at the centre).
  - Two lower side pockets – 18 cm wide and 20 cm deep, with slanting flaps (20 cm long and 7 cm wide) featuring a 2 cm backward slant.
- Sleeves:
- Crown of the sleeve is 16 cm at the centre and 8 cm at the sides, with a pointed finish.
- Front Buttons:
- Four large-sized regimental or general officers' pattern buttons (diameter 2.5 cm) placed vertically in front.
- Shoulder Straps:
  - Made from the same material as the jacket, fastened with a small regimental or general officers' pattern button (diameter 1.2 cm).
- Buttons on Cuffs (General Officer Ranks)

The number of small buttons (diameter 1.2 cm) on the cuffs indicates rank for general officers:

Rank	Number of Buttons
Brigadier	1
Major General	2
Lieutenant General	3
General	4
Field Marshal	5

- Trousers
- Design: Plain cut, shaped from the instep to heel, with a fly front and two side pockets. A single pleat is present at the front, facing outwards.
- Length: The trousers should be long enough to cover the heel when the wearer is standing upright.

==== Summer General Duty Uniform ====
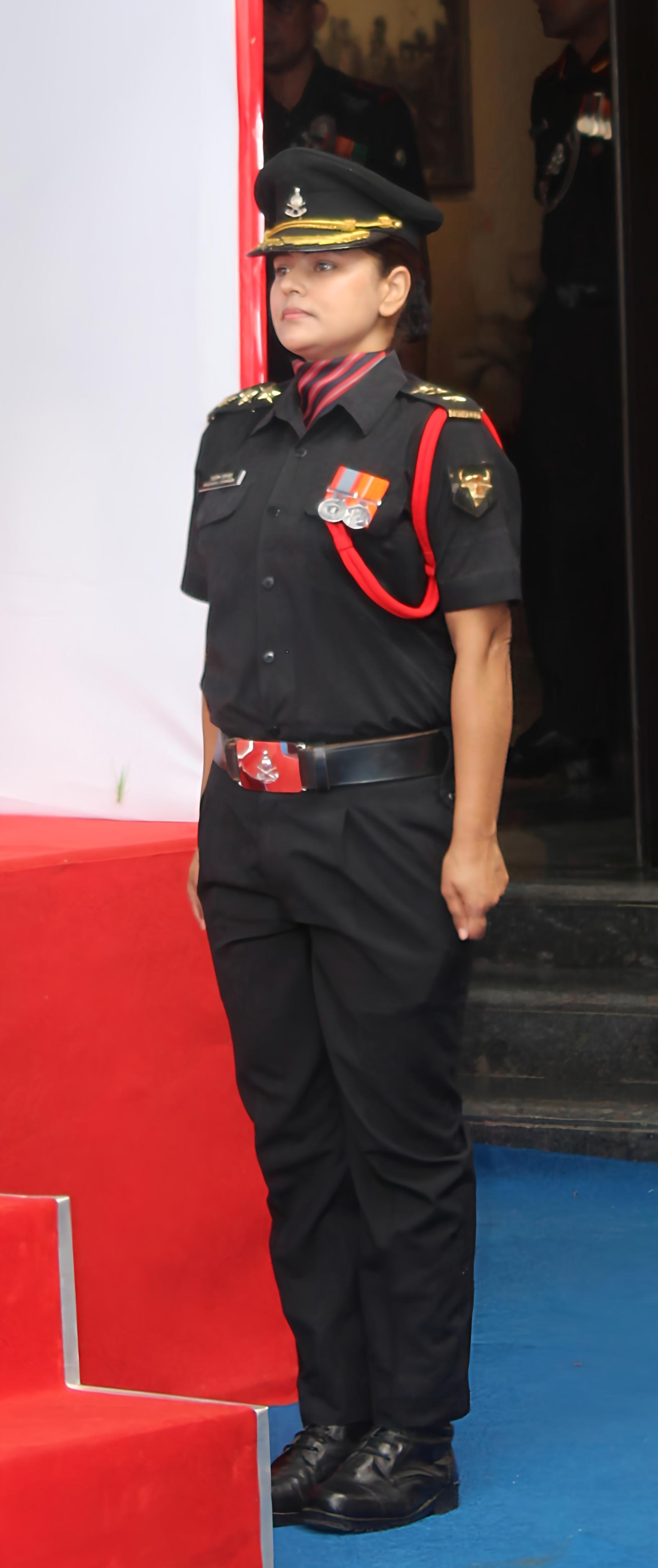
A woman officer of the Indian Army, in summer general duty uniform, in Captain insignia

=== Angola uniform ===
==== Angola Winter Uniform (No. 5 Dress – General Duty Winter) ====
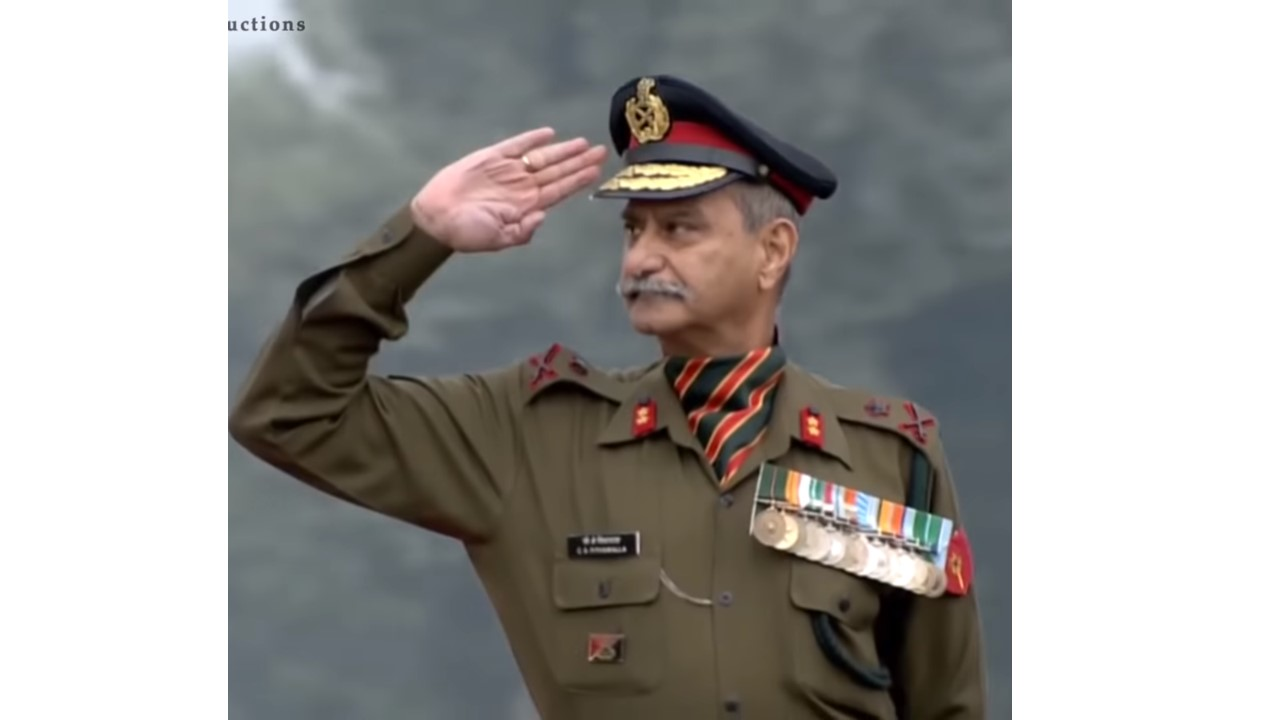
Major General Cyrus Pithawalla in Angola Winters' uniform

The Angola Winter Uniform is a cold-weather general duty uniform of the Indian Army. The term "Angola" refers to the poly-wool drab fabric used to make the winter shirt and trousers. This uniform is worn during winter for office duties, inspections, and other non-ceremonial functions where warmth and comfort are required. It replaces the lighter cotton shirts used in summer.

- Key Features

Feature	Description
Fabric / Material	Made of a poly-wool blend, typically consisting of 67% polyester and 33% wool, balancing warmth and durability.
Colour	A woolen drab shade — darker brownish-olive tone designed for winter general duty wear.
Design / Cut	Full-sleeve winter shirt with a fused collar, shoulder straps, two chest pockets with rectangular flaps, and lapped seams reinforced with double stitching.: The shirt is worn tucked into trousers for a formal appearance.; Trousers match the shirt in color and material.
Sizes	Available in eight standard sizes as per ordnance specifications.
Usage	Worn during the winter season by Indian Army personnel for regular duties, office wear, inspections, and semi-formal settings. It is not used for ceremonial occasions, where No. 1 Dress or Blue Patrol is mandated.

==== Composition ====
The Angola Winter Uniform consists of:

- Angola poly-wool drab shirt (full-sleeve)
- Matching Angola trousers
- Standard olive green woolen cap or beret, depending on corps/regiment
- Belt, insignia, and lanyards as per regimental specifications

==== Notes ====
- The Angola uniform is particularly common in high-altitude areas and northern India during peak winter.
- Its wool blend is designed to provide warmth without being overly heavy, balancing mobility and insulation.

=== Combat Disruptive Dress (Old) ===
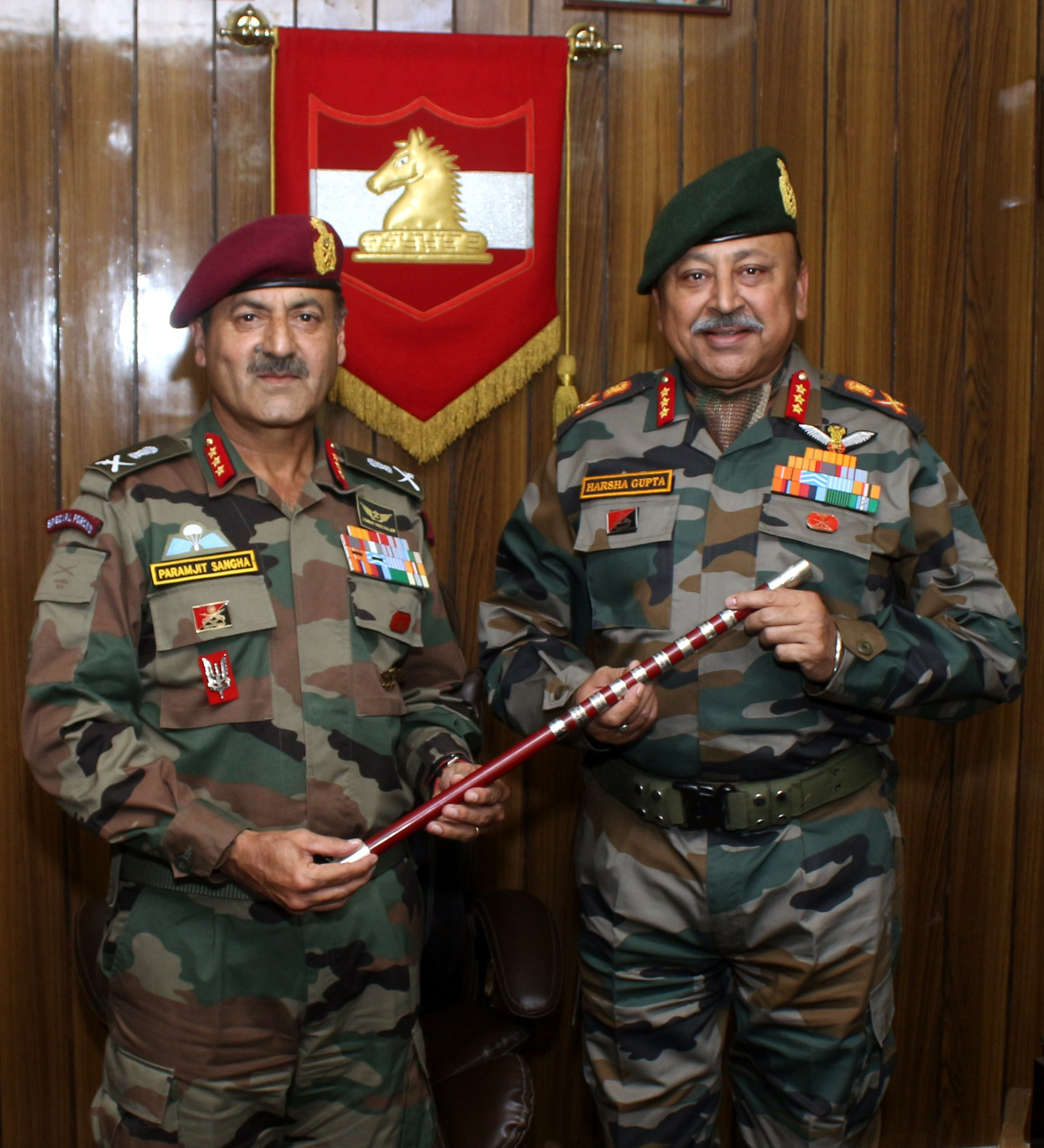
Lt Gen Harsha Gupta and Lt Gen Paramjit Singh Sangha in old Combat Disruptive Dress

==== Key Features ====
- It was in use since about 2008 until phased replacement began around 2022.
- Known as the “disruptive pattern combat uniform” (DPCU), adopting camouflage suited to a variety of terrains.

==== Material & Fabric ====
- It had heavyweight / thicker fabric, sometimes described as “denim-like” in thickness and weight, making it less comfortable in hot and humid conditions.
- Cotton-polyester blend; not as breathable or quick drying as the newer version.

==== Camouflage / Pattern ====
- Disruptive pattern: not digital/pixelated. Organic or blotchy pattern of olive green, brown, and other earth tones.
- Readily reproducible / more easily available in the market and imitators/copies. Because of that, the newer uniform sought to restrict unregulated copies.

==== Design / Style ====
- The shirt had to be tucked into trousers.
- No standard combat T-shirt under it as part of the official uniform (or not formalised as in the new uniform).
- Pockets, buttons, and belt style were simpler / less ergonomic. The trousers did not have waist adjustment features like elastic/buttons seen in newer uniforms.

==== Usage & Phasing Out ====
- The old uniform remained in active use while new designs were trialled and rolled out.
- Deadline to exhaust old uniform stock was extended to June 2026 from the original mid-2025.

=== Combat Disruptive Dress (New) ===
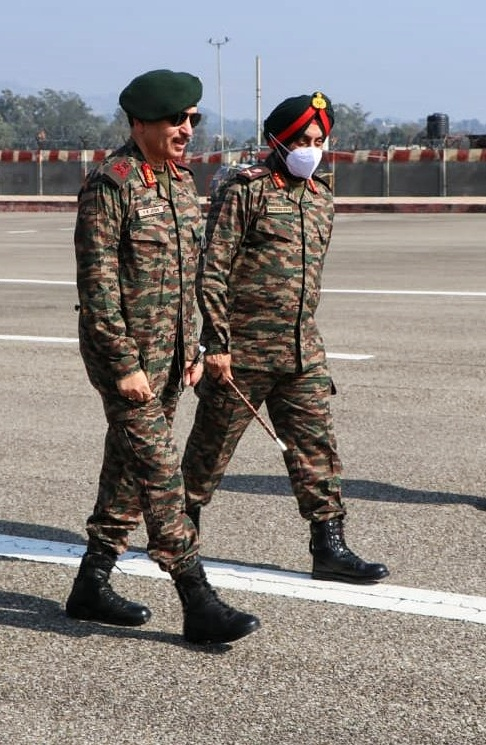
Two officers of the army in the new Combat Disruptive Dress

The new uniform has been designed in collaboration with the National Institute of Fashion Technology (NIFT), after the Indian Army supplied specifications. It replaces the older disruptive pattern uniform (in use since 2008) in a phased manner.

==== Material & Fabric ====
- The fabric is lighter, more breathable, yet sturdy and durable.
- It is quick-drying, better suited for humid or extreme climatic conditions.
- The cotton:polyester ratio is approximately 70:30.
- The new weave is stronger against tearing compared to the old uniform.

==== Camouflage pattern ====
The camouflage is now a digital, disruptive/pixelated type, rather than older organic/disruptive prints. The pattern was specially created; among ~15 pattern options and multiple fabrics, one was selected after trials. The colours include olive green, earthen shades, suitable for multi-terrain deployment — deserts, mountains, jungles etc.

==== Design / Style Changes ====
- The shirt no longer needs to be tucked into the trousers.
- A T-shirt is worn underneath the shirt.
- Jackets (shirts) have: angular top pockets; lower pockets with vertical openings; a pocket on the left sleeve; a pen holder on the left forearm; and knife pleats at the back.
- Trousers have waist adjustability via elastic and buttons; double layer in the groin area.
- Caps or headgear have adjustable girths; better quality logo.

==== Sizes, Distribution & Miscellaneous ====
The uniform is available in 13 standard sizes. Women’s versions have also been designed with gender-specific modifications. The new uniform is not to be available in the open market; it will only be issued through proper military/ordnance/canteen channels. The design and camouflage pattern now have Intellectual Property Rights (IPR) registered by the Indian Army.

=== Snow Camouflage Uniform ===
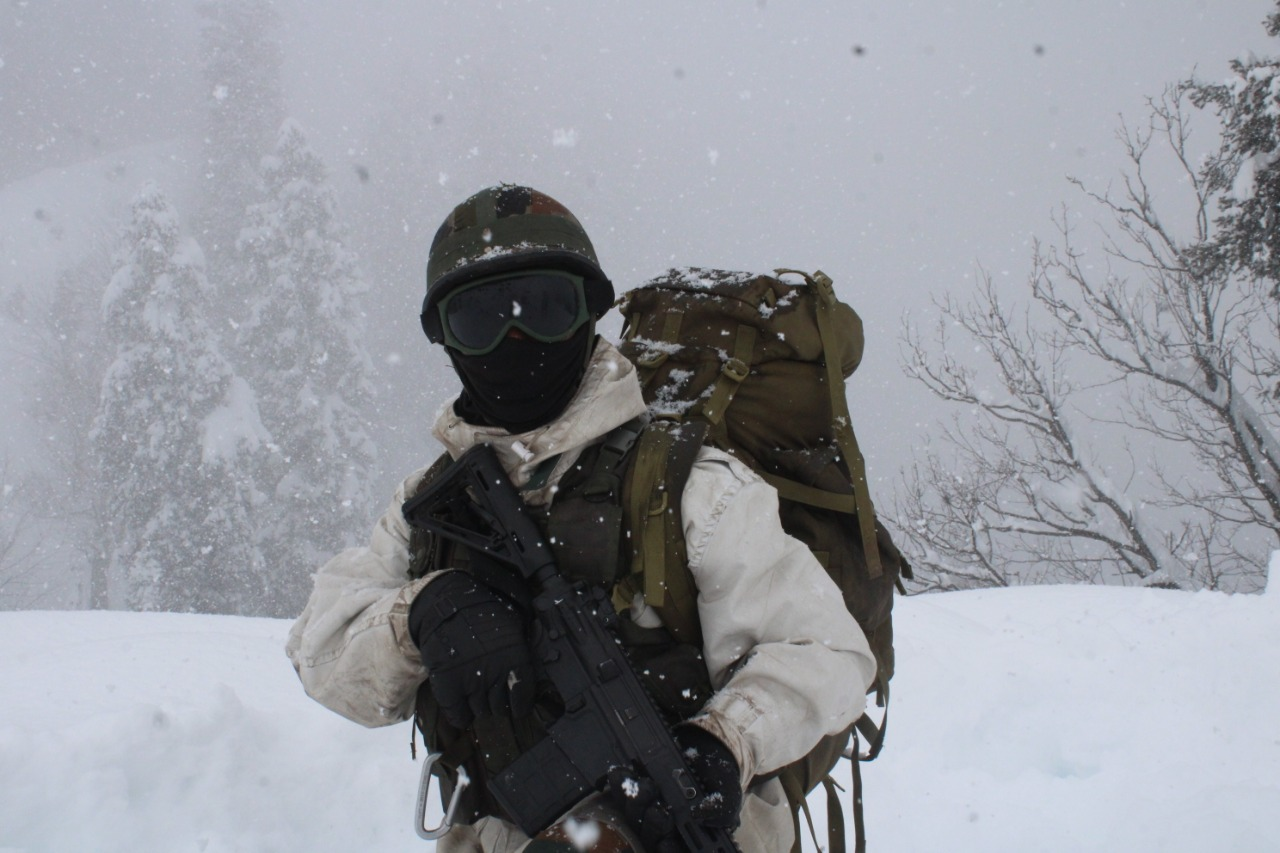
A soldier in Snow Camouflage Uniform with combat load

Snow Camouflage Uniform, also referred to as Himkavach dress by the Indian Army, is a combat dress designed to withstand the extreme sub-zero cold temperatures at Siachen Glacier, Ladakh, and in the state of Sikkim, where military personnel are deployed year-round. This dress was developed in coordination with Defence Research and Development Organisation, and its working range is reported to be from 20 & nbsp °C to -60 & nbsp °C (68 & nbsp °F to -76 & nbsp °F).

This uniform is an overgarment worn over a standard combat or cold-weather uniform, especially in snow-bound terrain. It is mostly white or light in colour, to camouflage with the snowy terrain, sometimes with a reversible or internal white lining. It is part of the Extended Cold Weather Clothing System (ECWCS), designed for high altitude deployments, along Line of Actual Control and Line of Control. The uniform allows layering, breathability, mobility and integrates with other snow gear (boots, gloves, goggles), which is crucial for deployment in such extreme regions, with low atmospheric oxygen and pressure, as low as 42% of available oxygen at sea level, and atmospheric pressure as low as 0.425 atm or 322.5 mmHg.

=== Mess Dress (Winter) – Dress No. 5 (Officers Only) ===
The Indian Army Mess Dress Winter, also known as Green/Blue Patrol, is a formal evening uniform worn exclusively by officers for mess functions, state events, and other official formal occasions.

==== Specifications ====
- Material: Serge (high-quality woolen fabric).
- Colours: Dark blue or dark green, depending on the regiment or corps pattern.

==== Patrol Jacket ====
- Broad back cut with two curved seams and two side slits (15 cm) for comfort.
- Five medium-sized regimental or general officer pattern buttons (diameter 1.5 cm) on the front, spaced 2–3 cm below the collar fastening.
- Two breast plain patch pockets, each 14 cm wide × 15 cm deep with pointed flaps (13 cm × 6 cm), secured by press buttons and small buttons.
- Sleeves have pointed cuffs, 6 cm deep at the back and 14 cm deep at the front.
- Stand-up stiff collar, maximum height of 5 cm, fastened with hooks and eyes.
- Epaulettes and pocket flaps fastened by small buttons (diameter 1.2 cm).

==== Buttons on Cuffs by Rank ====
Rank	Number of Buttons
Brigadier	1
Major General	2
Lieutenant General	3
General	4
Field Marshal	5

==== Footwear ====
- Black socks and black leather brogue shoes.
- Officers of mounted arms (e.g., Armoured Corps, ASC, RVC, mechanised units) may wear Wellingtons (high boots).
- Box spurs are authorised for field rank officers and above when wearing Wellingtons.

==== Shirt ====
- White terry-cloth full-sleeved shirt without collar or pocket.
- Soft front with single semi-stiff cuffs.

==== Trousers ====
- Same material as the patrol jacket.
- Regimental or corps-coloured stripes along side seams (width: 4 cm).
- Side pockets opening width: 10 cm.
- Buttons provided for braces.
- Plain cut with the bottom shaped from instep to heel.
- Length sufficient to cover the heel when standing.

==== Accessories & Insignia ====
- Regimental or corps pattern side cap or black turban (for Sikh officers).
- Colonels and above wear triple-plaited slip-on cords or chains with badges of rank through jacket loops.
- Gorget patches for Colonels and above.
- Miniature medals only (full-sized medals not worn).
- Name tab, aiguillettes, and pouch belts were authorised.
- COAS/Army commendation badges.

==== Occasions for Wearing ====
- State functions at Lok Bhavan or Rashtrapati Bhavan.
- Receptions hosted by the:
  - President of India
  - Prime Minister
  - The Governors of States
  - Chief of Army Staff (COAS)
  - Chief of Naval Staff (CNS)
  - Chief of Air Staff (CAS)
  - Army Commanders (GOC-in-C)
- Diplomatic receptions involving foreign missions.
- Dining-in and Dining-out ceremonies at officers' messes.
- Retreat and Reveille ceremonies.

==== Equivalent Service Dress Codes ====
Service	Equivalent Dress Code
Indian Navy	Dress No. 5 Winter
Indian Air Force	Dress No. 9 Winter

==== Additional Notes ====
- Lanyards, insignias, and formation signs are not worn with this dress.
- Only miniature medals are displayed.
- The dress is worn strictly between retreat and reveille.

=== Flight suit (Dungarees) ===
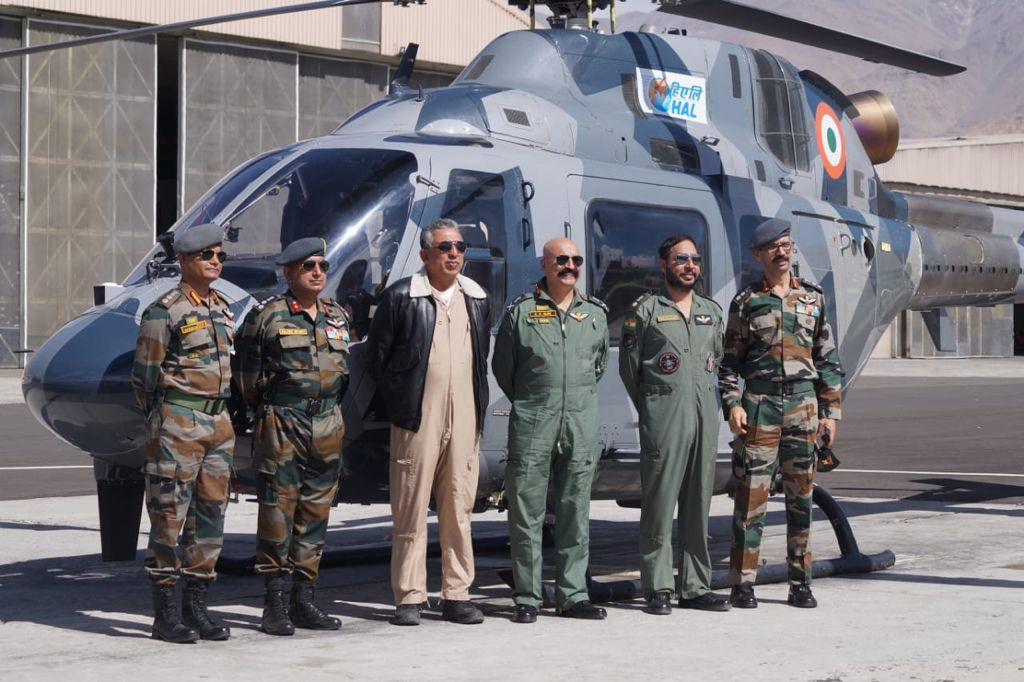
Two army aviators wearing dungarees, (second and third from the right)

Personnel of the Army Aviation Corps are authorized to wear dungarees, which are regularly worn by army helicopter pilots, as the army does not operate other types of aircraft like those in the Indian Naval Air Arm or the IAF.

==== Key Features ====
- The “Dungaree” is a one-piece suit (jump-suit / overall) worn by piloting and aircrew personnel of the Army Aviation Corps.
- It is designed for mobility, quick donning/doffing, and comfort during flying, making tasks easier in cockpit/aircraft environments.
- Winter Dungaree: In colder conditions, a light brown or tan jacket is worn over the dungaree for extra warmth.
- The dungarees do not require belts or standard trousers + shirt/pant combos because the one-piece is self-contained. This reduces complexity and improves safety in flying operations.
- Attachments like name, dress ranks, regimental / corps insignia are placed on the dungarees.

==== Mobility & safety ====
It is designed for quick movement and less loose material that could snap.

== President's Bodyguard ==
=== Bodyguard ===
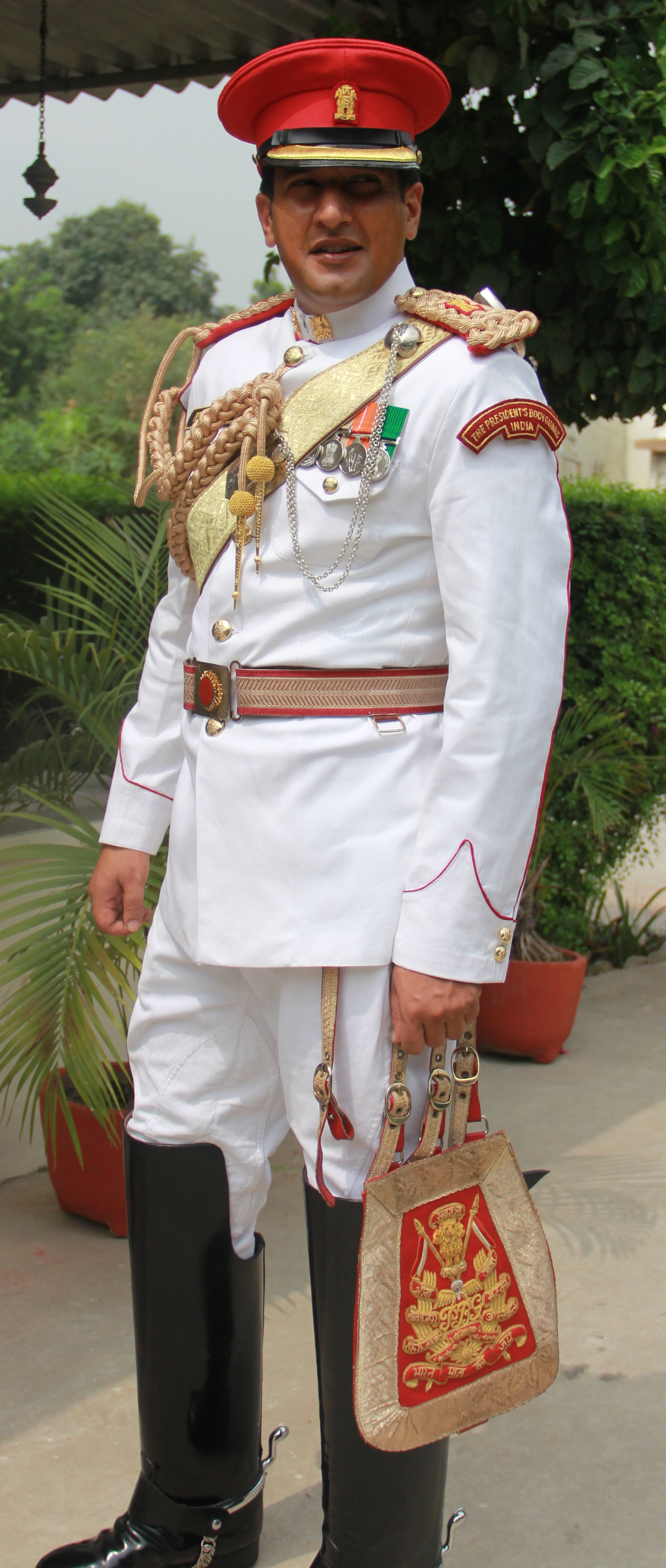
PBG officer in traditional uniform

=== Cavalry/Armoured (Red) ===
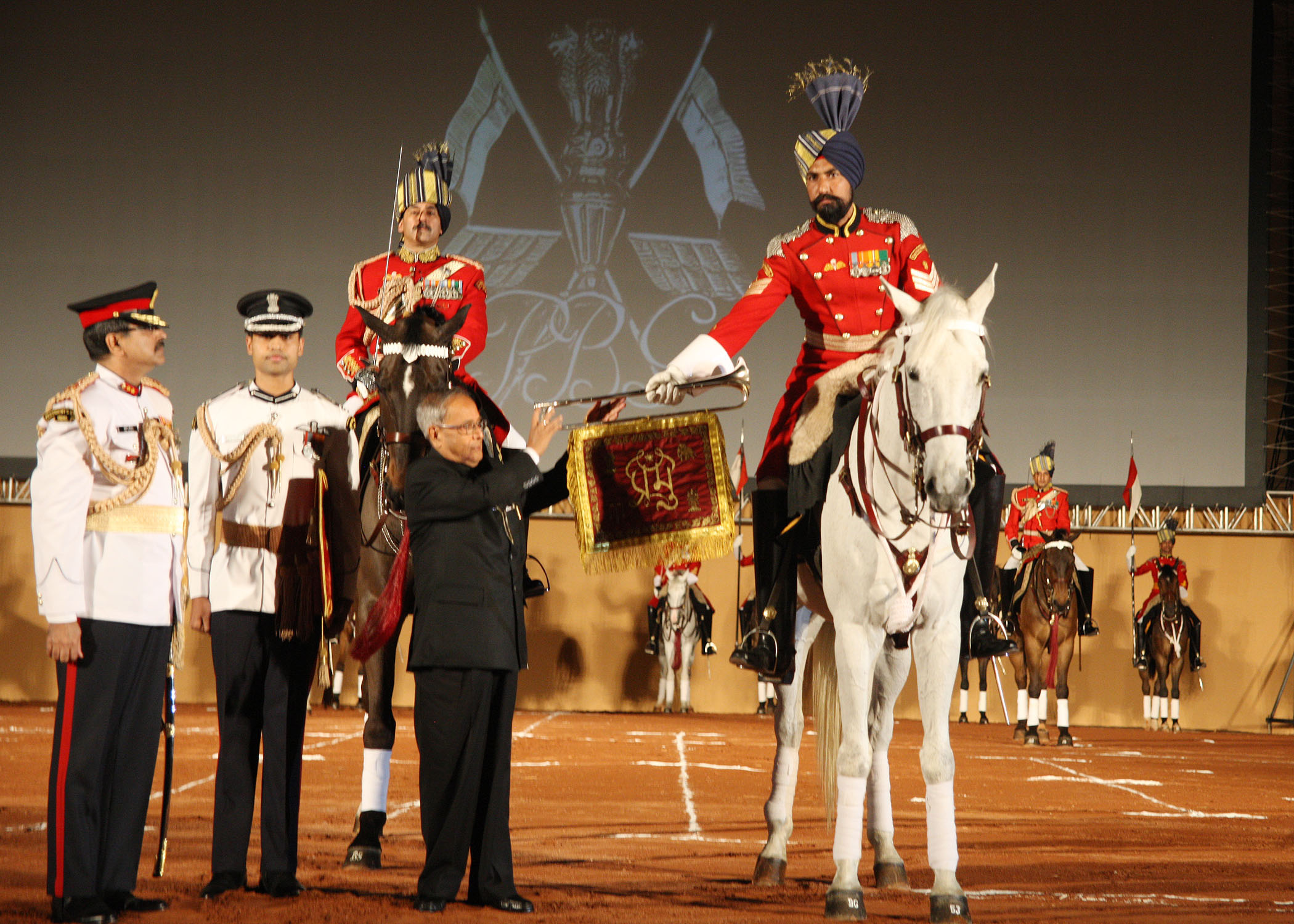
President Pranab Mukherjee's trumpet banner being given to a Quartermaster Havildar

=== Cavalry/Armoured (White) ===
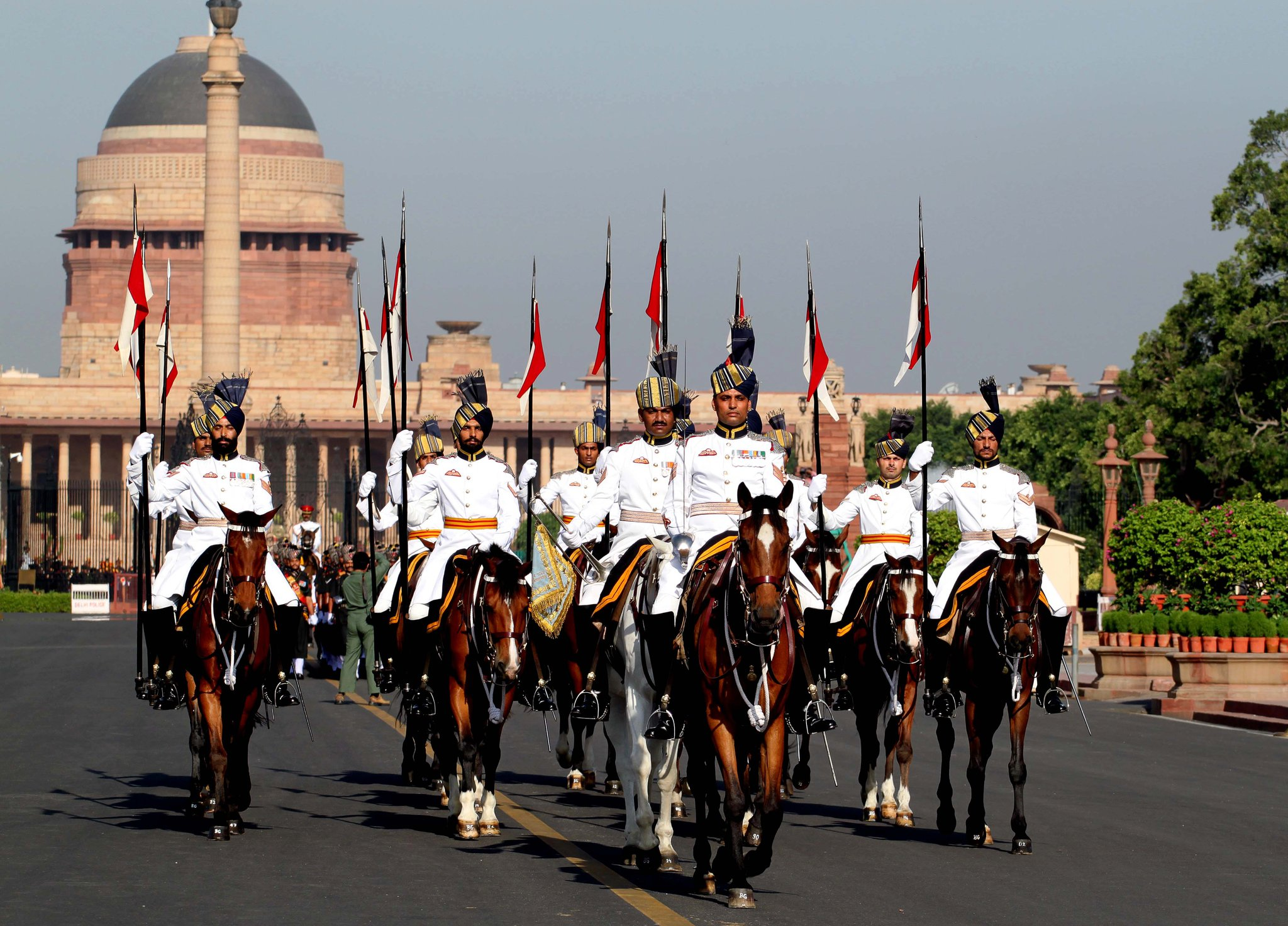
President's Bodyguards from Cavalry Regiment during a parade

== Indian Navy ==
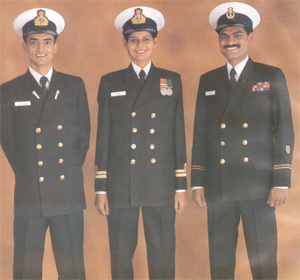
Navy Dress No. 1 and 3

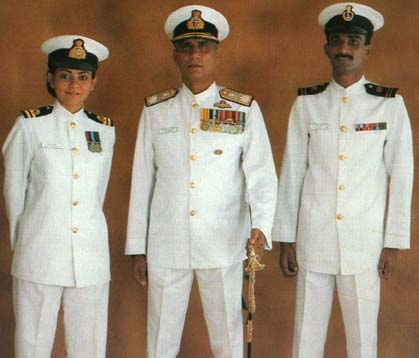
Navy Dress No.2 and 4

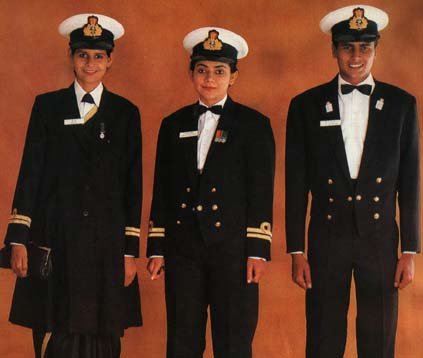
Navy Dress 4A and 7

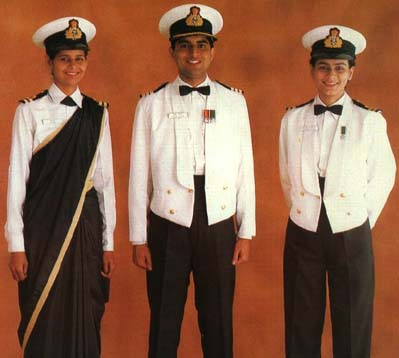
Navy Dress No. 5

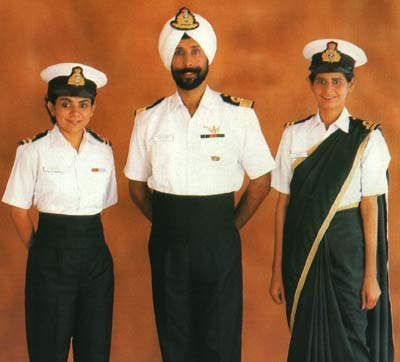
Navy Dress No 6B

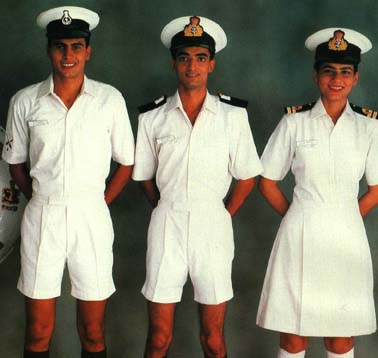
Navy Dress No 8

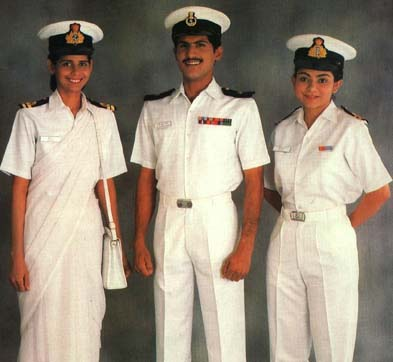
Navy Dress No 8A

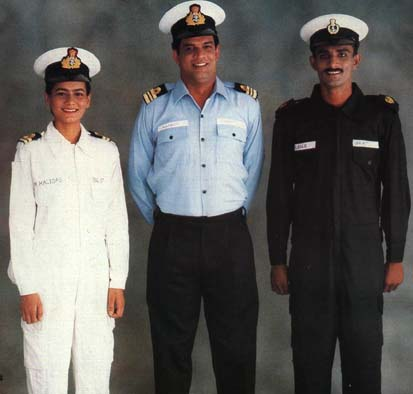
Navy Dress No 9

== Historical uniforms ==
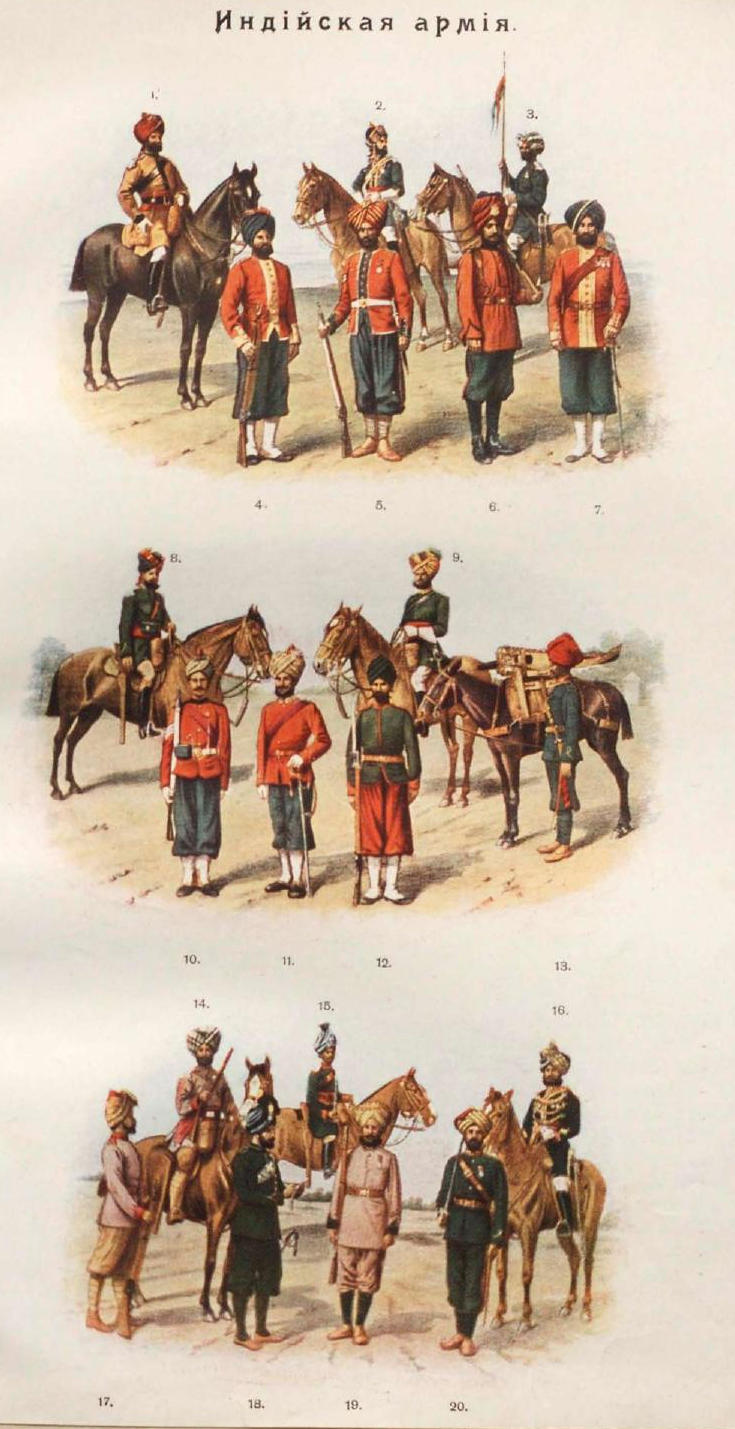

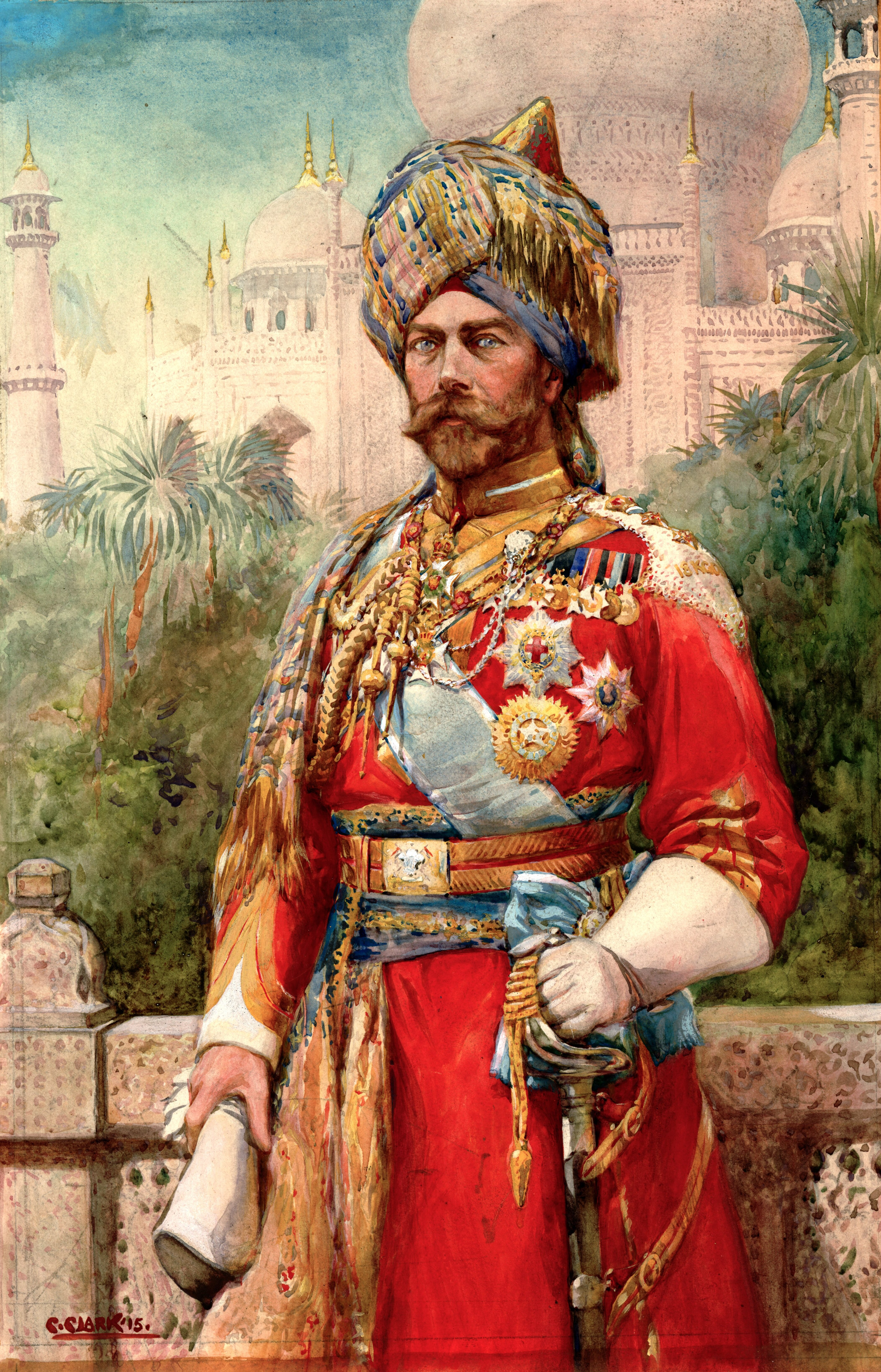

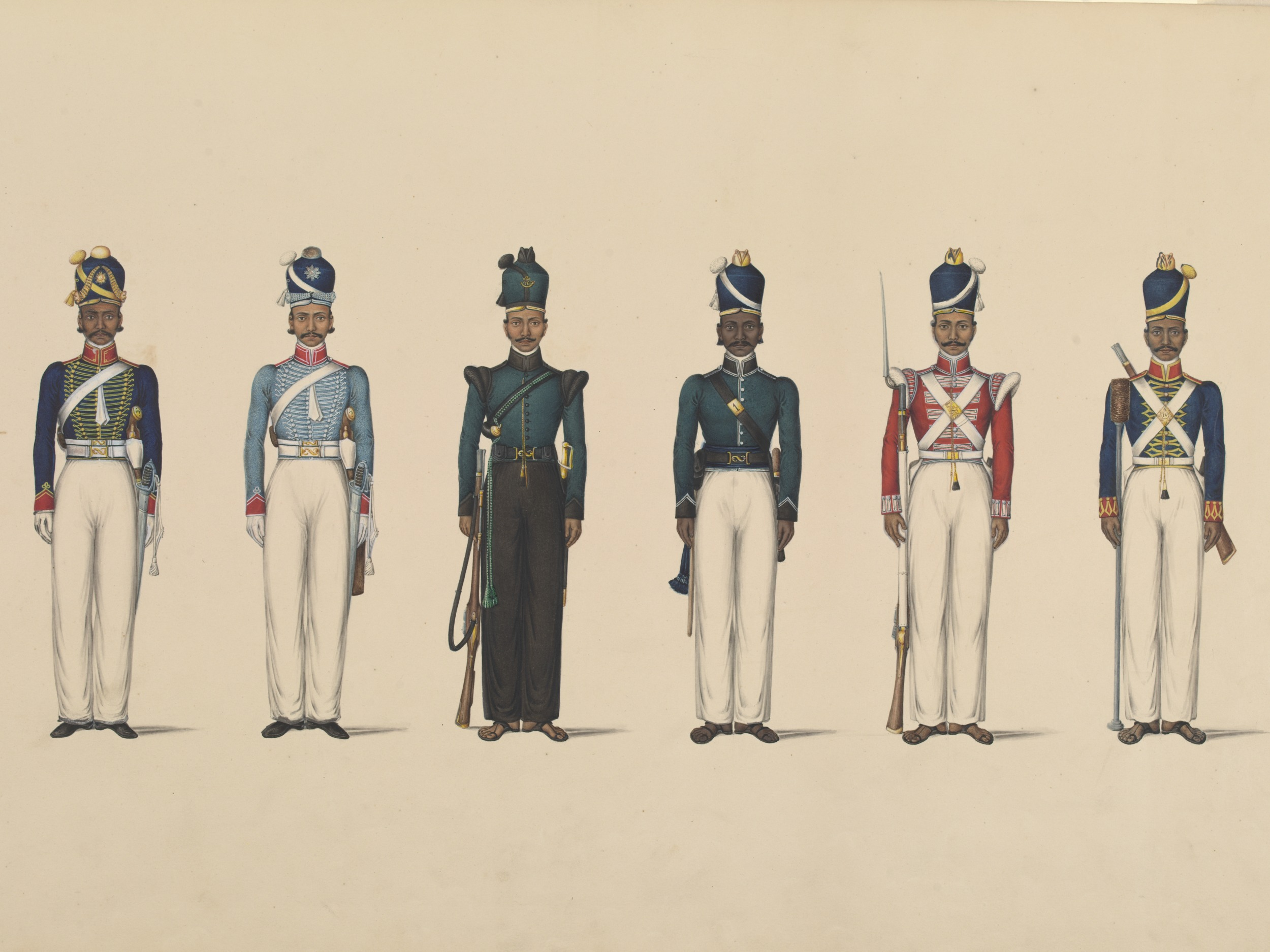

== See also ==
- Indian Army
- Indian Navy
- Indian Airforce
- President's Bodyguard
- Regiment of Artillery
- Rajputana Rifles
- Indian Army ranks and insignia
- Indian Air Force ranks and insignia
- Indian Navy ranks and insignia
- Uniforms of the British Army
- Army Aviation Corps
- Police ranks and insignia of India
