= Acting lance daffadar =

Non-commissioned officer rank in the Indian and Pakistan Armies

Acting lance daffadar (ALD) is a non-commissioned officer rank used in the armies of Pakistan and India, ranking between lance daffadar and sowar. It was also used in the British Indian Army. The rank is equivalent to the rank of lance corporal used in British Army. Its infantry equivalent is lance naik. The rank is used in cavalry and armoured regiments of Indian Army and Pakistan Army and formerly in the British Indian Army. The rank insignia for an acting lance daffadar is a single chevron similar to lance naik.

The role of an Acting Lance daffadar is to assist in the leadership of small teams or units.
