= Lance daffadar =

Non-commissioned officer rank in the Indian and Pakistan Armies

Lance daffadar (L/Dfdr, LD or L/Duf) is the equivalent rank to corporal in Pakistan, Indian and British Indian Army cavalry units, ranking between acting lance daffadar and daffadar. In other units the equivalent is naik. Like a British corporal, a lance daffadar wears two rank chevrons.
