= Havildar =

Rank in the Bangladeshi, Indian and Pakistani armies

- Indian and Pakistani rank insignia
- Country: India; Pakistan
- Service branch: Army
- Rank group: Enlisted rank
- Next higher rank: Naib subedar
- Next lower rank: Naik
- Equivalent ranks: Sergeant; Daffadar

Havildar or havaldar (Hindustani: हविलदार or हवलदार (Devanagari), حوالدار (Perso-Arabic)) is a rank in the Indian and Pakistani armies, equivalent to sergeant. It is not used in cavalry and armoured units, where the equivalent is daffadar.

Like a British sergeant, a havildar wears three rank chevrons.

== History ==
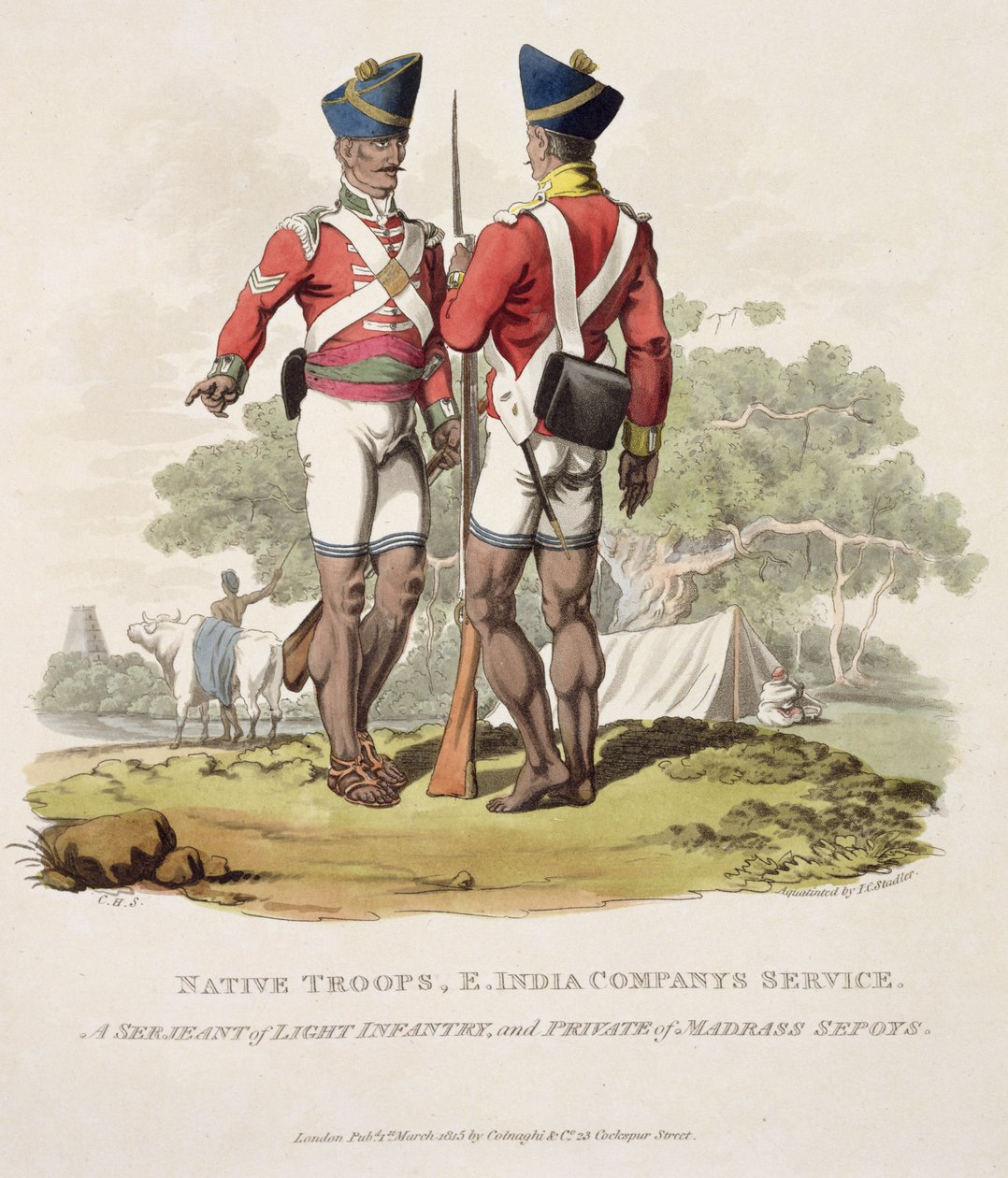
1812 engraving of a Madras Army havildar (left)

"Havildar" is a Persian word in origin and means "person in charge", or more loosely "chief", from the Arabic حواله ("charge", "responsibility") and the Persian دار (dâr, "holder"). Historically, a havildar was a senior commander, being in charge of a fort during the times of the Mughal Empire. It was used as the equivalent of a sergeant in the Presidency armies and British Indian Army, which has led to its current usage.

== Appointments ==
=== Indian Army ===
Havildars could be further appointed to positions of higher authority. The appointments of company quartermaster havildar and company havildar major existed in the British Indian Army. Historically, the two senior-most havildars of a company became the CQMH and the CHM. However, these were just appointments and the commanding officer could promote or demote any of these ranks at his discretion. These appointments still technically exist in the modern Indian Army. However, havildars are now promoted directly to junior commissioned officer rank, as the duties of these historical appointments are now carried out by JCOs.

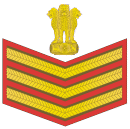
The company quartermaster havildar (CQMH), equivalent to a company quartermaster sergeant, assisted the quartermaster in managing the company stores. The insignia was three chevrons with an Ashoka lion emblem above.

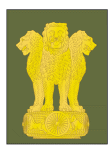
The company havildar major (CHM) was the most senior non-commissioned officer in a company, equivalent to a company sergeant major. The insignia was an Ashoka lion emblem.

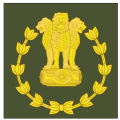
The regimental quartermaster havildar (RQMH) was equivalent to a regimental quartermaster sergeant.

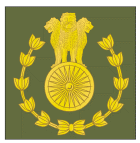
The regimental havildar major (RHM) was equivalent to a regimental sergeant major.

=== Pakistan Army ===
Senior havildars might also be appointed company quartermaster havildar, company havildar major, battalion quartermaster havildar or battalion havildar major in the Pakistan Army. All of these appointments have different insignia and may vary from unit to unit.

Company quartermaster havildar

Company havildar major

Battalion quartermaster havildar

Battalion havildar major
