= Daffadar =

NCO rank in Indian and Pakistani cavalry

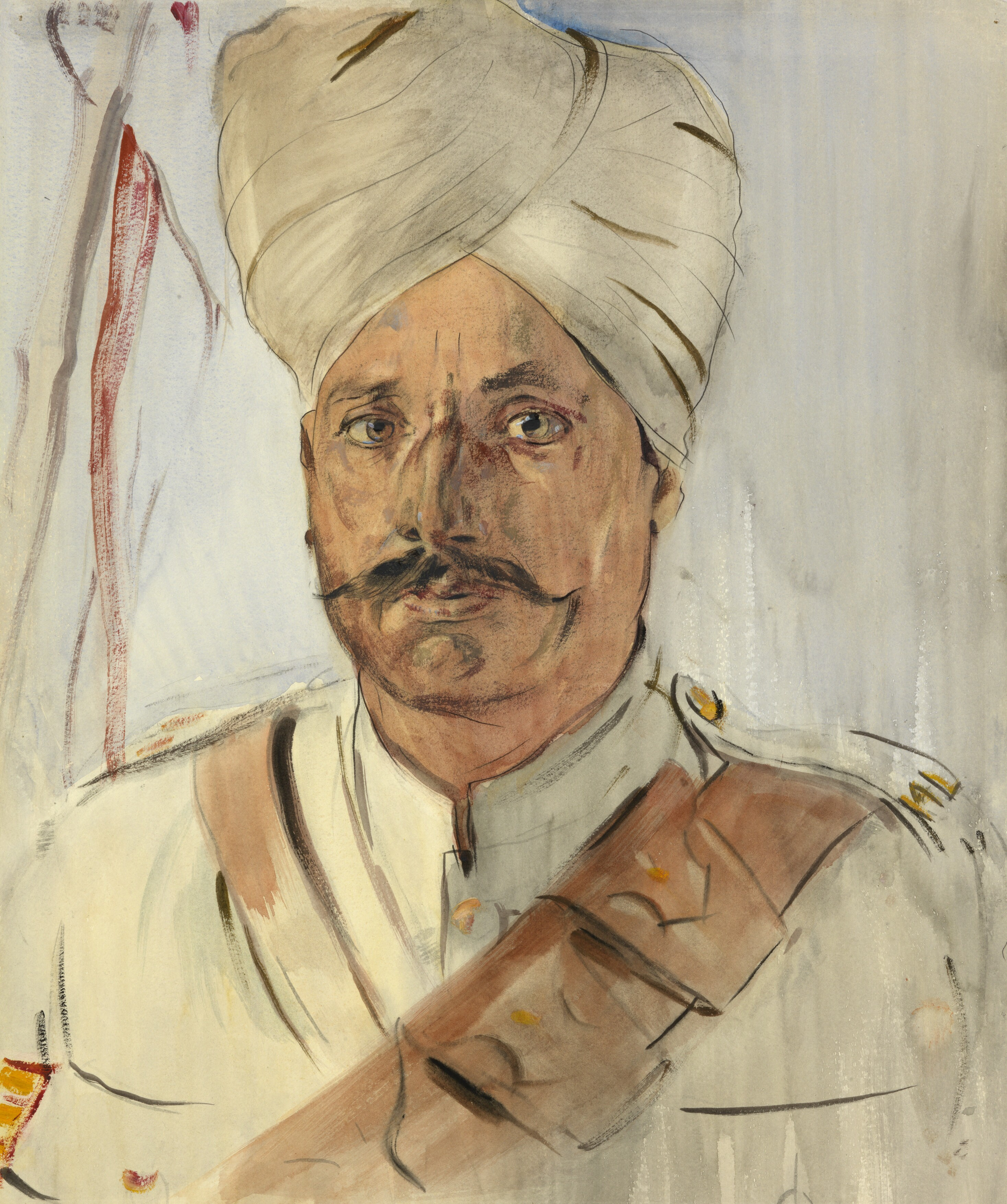
c. 1914–1918 portrait of a daffadar of the British Indian Army's 14th Murray's Jat Lancers

Daffadar (Hindustani: दफ़ादार (Devanagari); دفعدار (Nastaliq)) is the equivalent rank to sergeant in the Indian and Pakistani cavalry, as it was formerly in the British Indian Army. The rank below is lance daffadar. The equivalent in infantry and other units is havildar. Like a British sergeant, a daffadar wears three rank chevrons.

The etymology of the word is unclear. The -dar suffix, found in havildar and other words, means "holder". Thus the word means "holder of dafa' ". The intended meaning of dafa' is, however, unclear. In Arabic it means "pay" or "push", while in Persian, the more obvious source of the word, it means repulsion. It is unclear what role, if any, the word daffadar indicated in the Mughal Empire before it was used as a British Raj rank.
