= Indian Army cap badges =

Badges designed on the regimental coat of arms

Officers and soldiers of the Indian Army wear cap badges (metallic or embroidered badges) on their beret or peaked caps. The design is based on the regimental insignia or coat of arms.

The infantry and the armoured corp regiments wear the unit insignia of their individual regiments. Individual regiments or units in other combat arms and the service arms wear the insignia of their corps or arm.

Officers of the rank of Brigadier and above wear embroidered badges having the Ashoka emblem with crossed baton and sword.

== Infantry Regiments ==
Assam Regiment

Bihar Regiment

Brigade of the Guards

Dogra Regiment

Garhwal Rifles

The Grenadiers

1st Gorkha Rifles

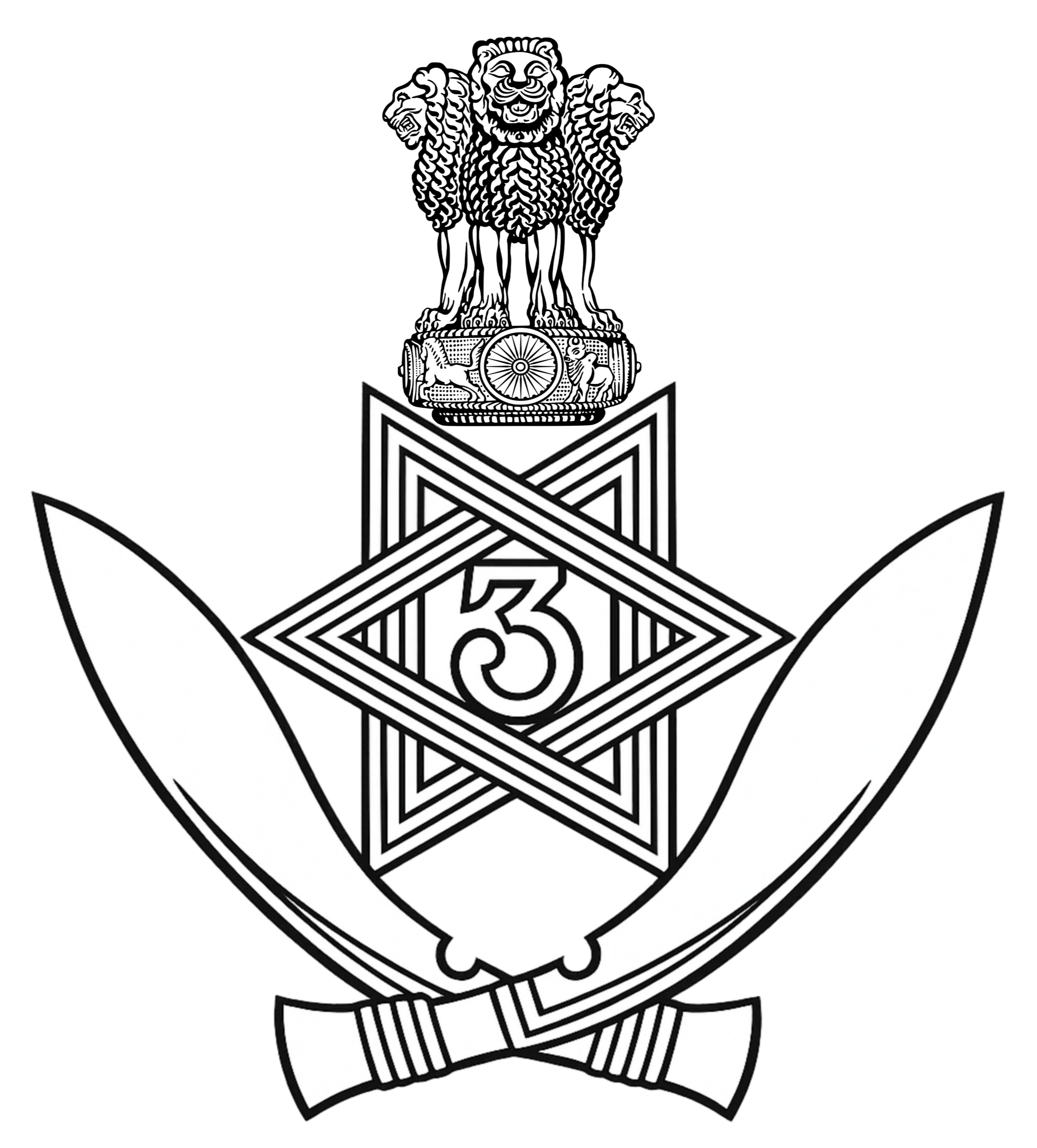
3rd Gorkha Rifles

4th Gorkha Rifles

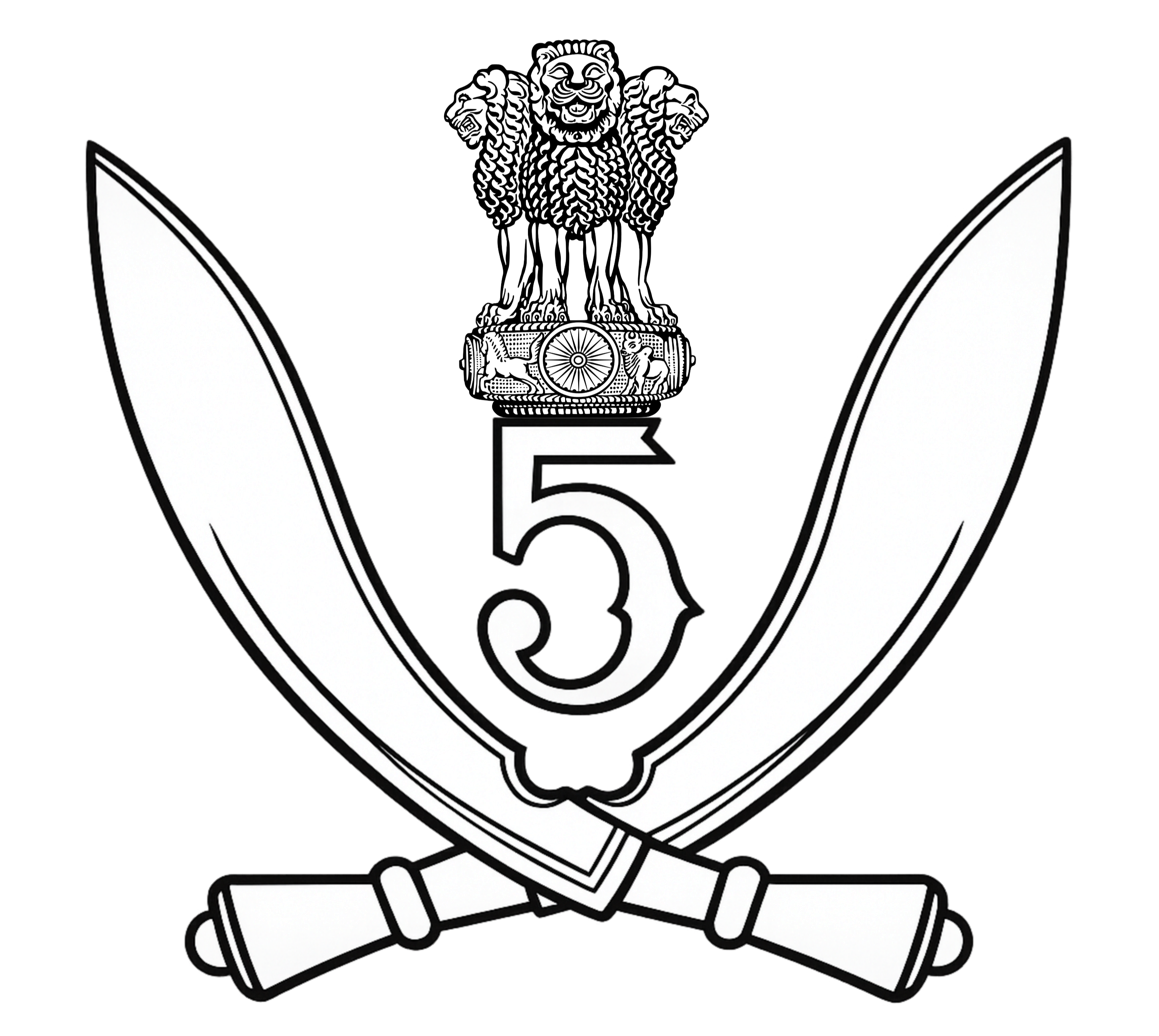
5th Gorkha Rifles (Frontier Force)

8th Gorkha Rifles

9th Gorkha Rifles

11th Gorkha Rifles

Jammu and Kashmir Light Infantry

Jammu & Kashmir Rifles

Jat Regiment

Kumaon Regiment

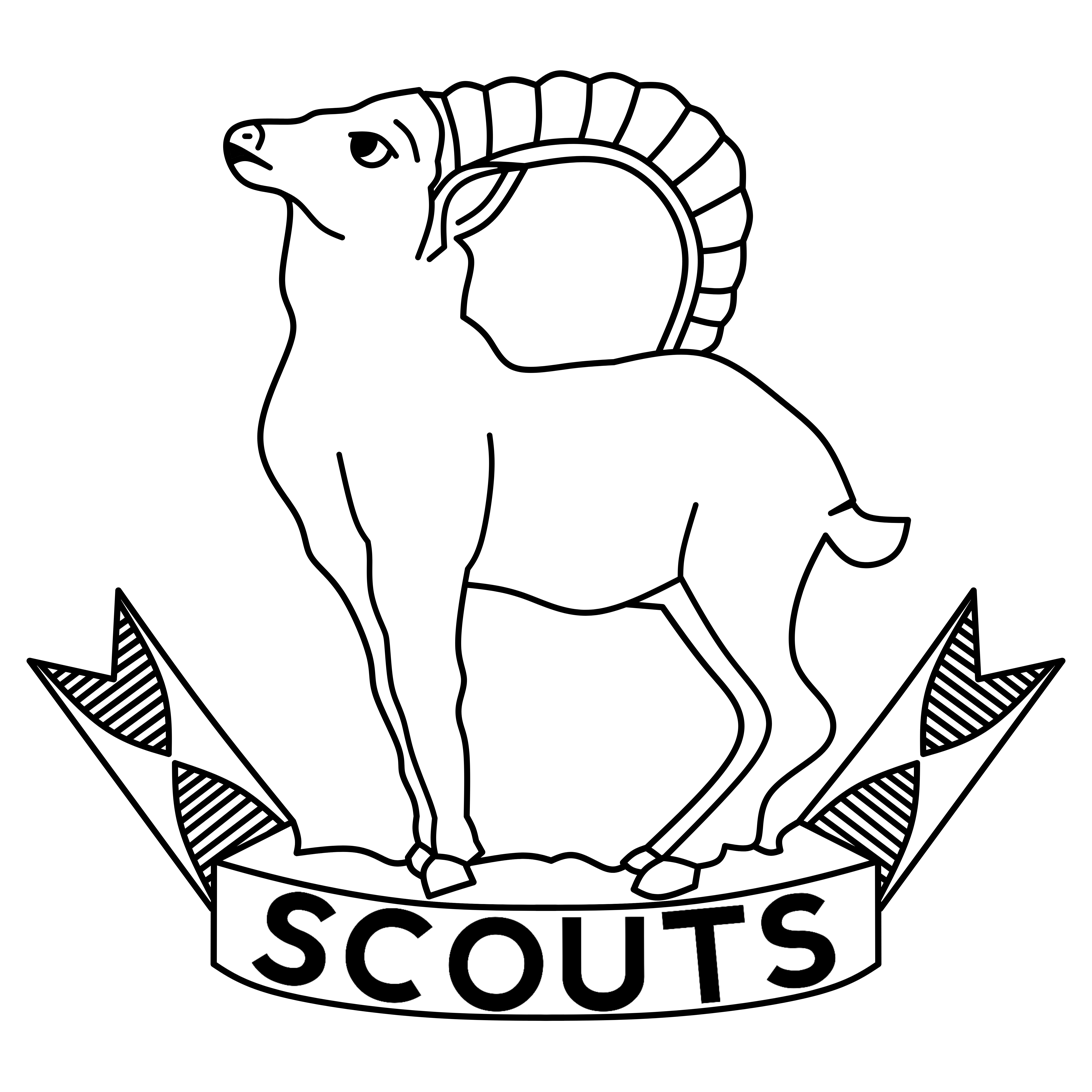
Ladakh Scouts

Madras Regiment

Mahar Regiment

Maratha Light Infantry

Mechanised Infantry Regiment

Naga Regiment

Parachute Regiment

Punjab Regiment

Rajput Regiment

Rajputana Rifles

Sikh Light Infantry

Sikh Regiment

== Armoured Corps ==
Armoured Corps (Note: This badge is the generic badge used by the Indian Armoured Corps, and usually worn by soldiers (sowars) before they are assigned to individual units.)

1st Horse (Skinner's Horse)

2nd Lancers (Gardner's Horse)

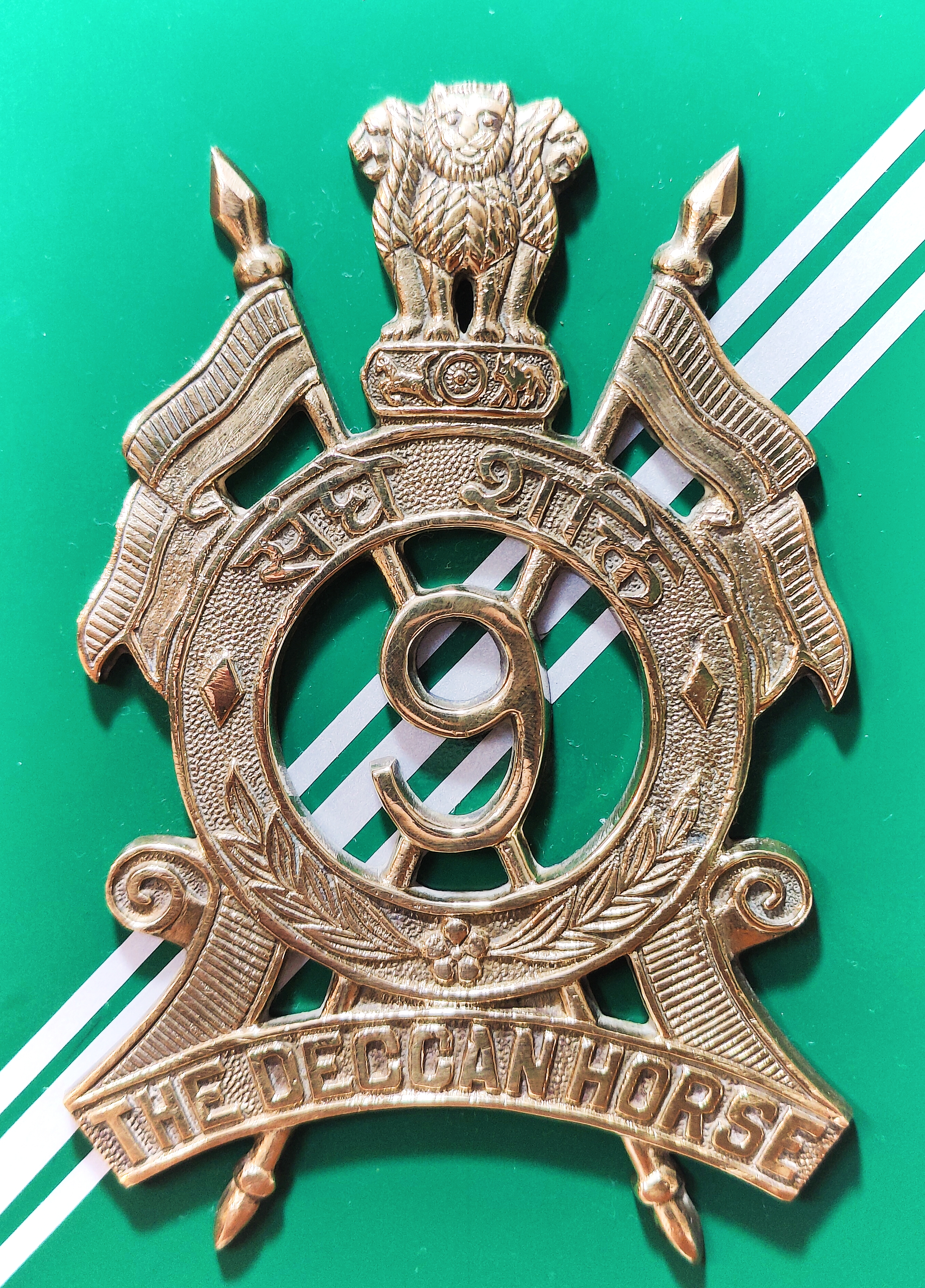
9 Horse (Deccan Horse)

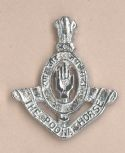
17 Horse (Poona Horse)

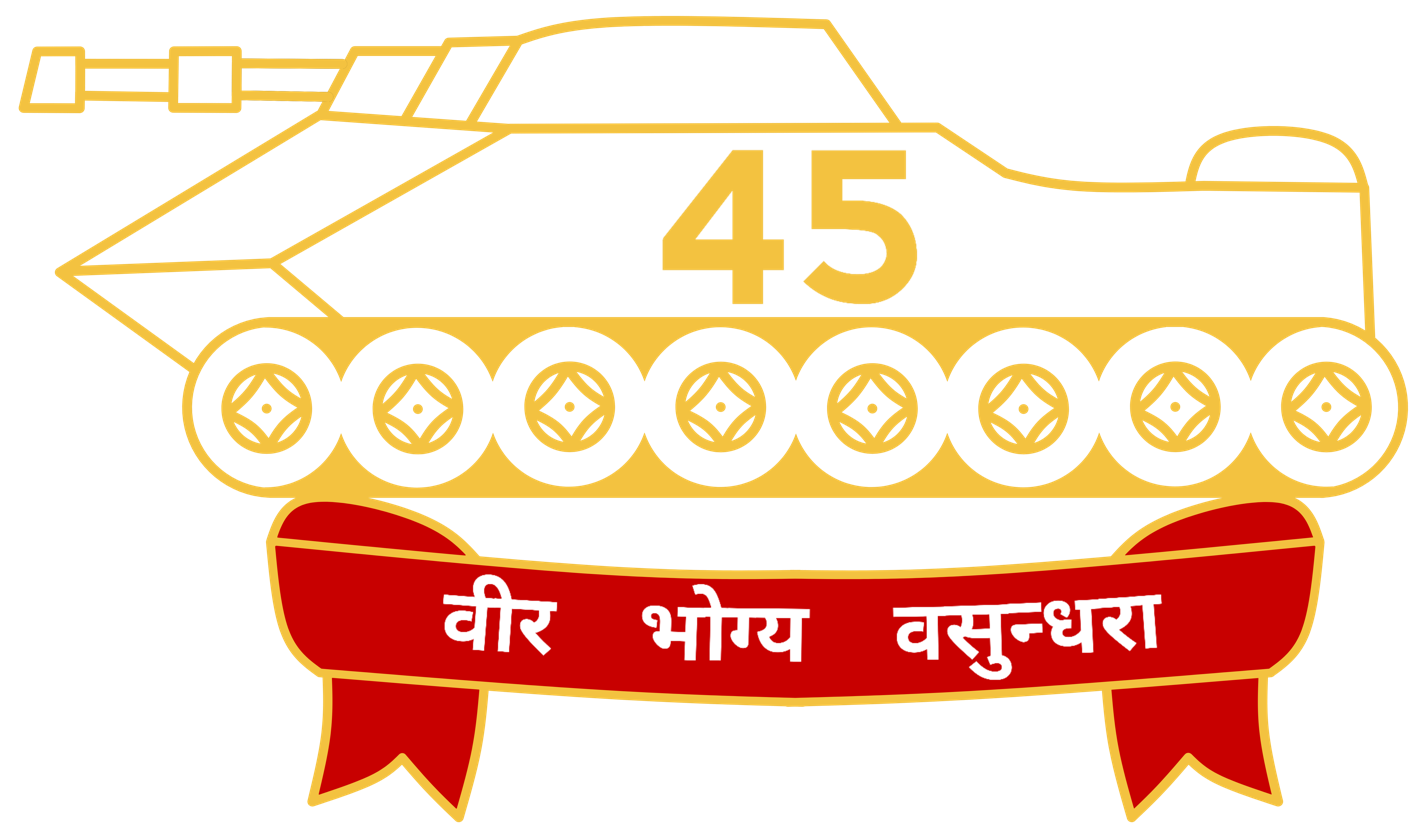
45 Cavalry

47 Armoured Regiment

61 Cavalry

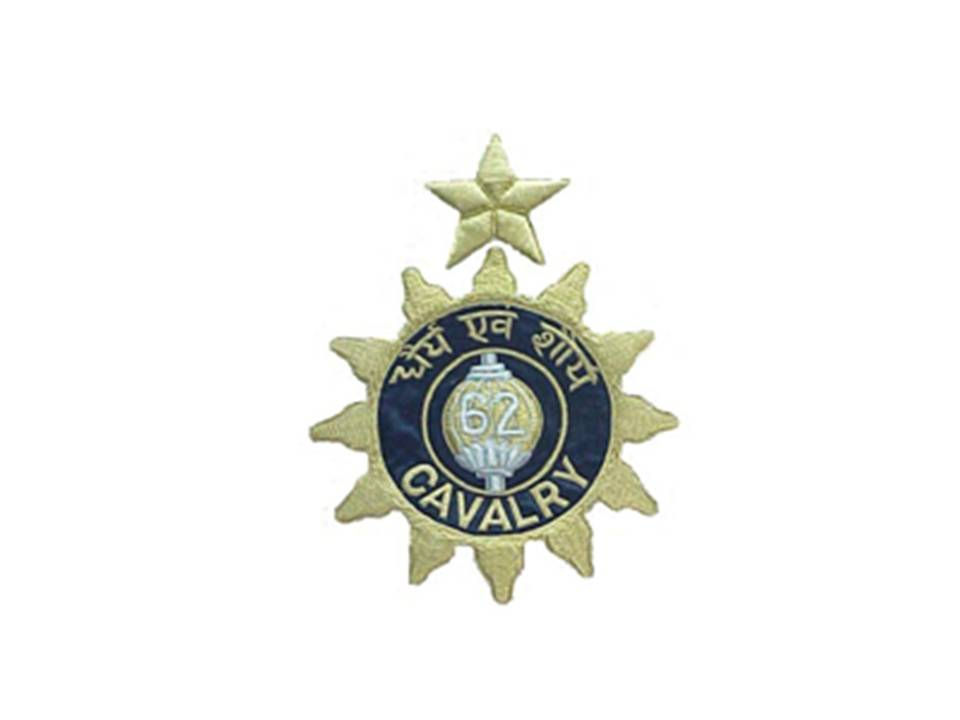
62 Cavalry

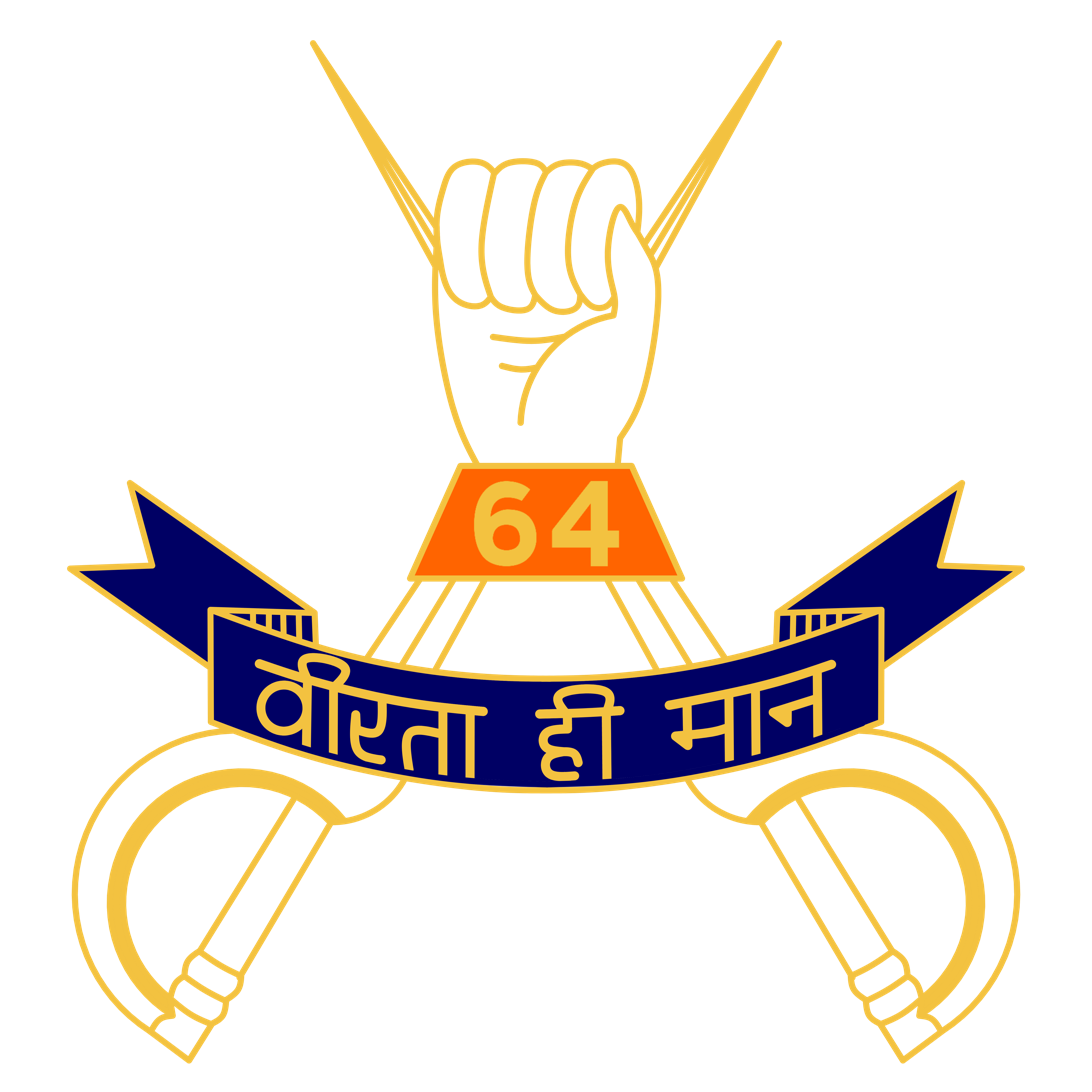
64 Cavalry

66 Armoured Regiment

67 Armoured Regiment

70 Armoured Regiment

74 Armoured Regiment

81 Armoured Regiment

== Other Corps ==
Army Air Defence

Army Aviation Corps

Army Dental Corps

Army Education Corps

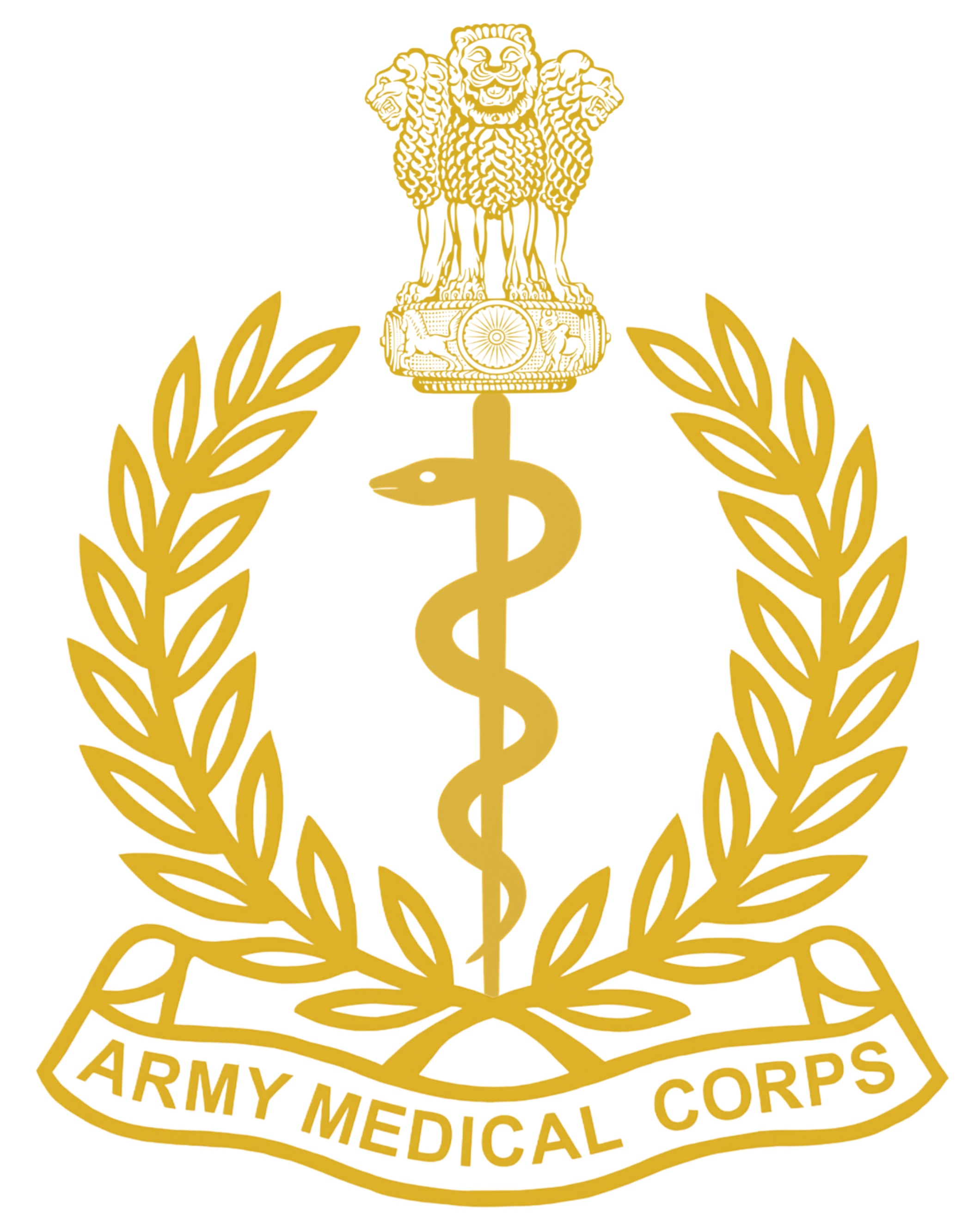
Army Medical Corps

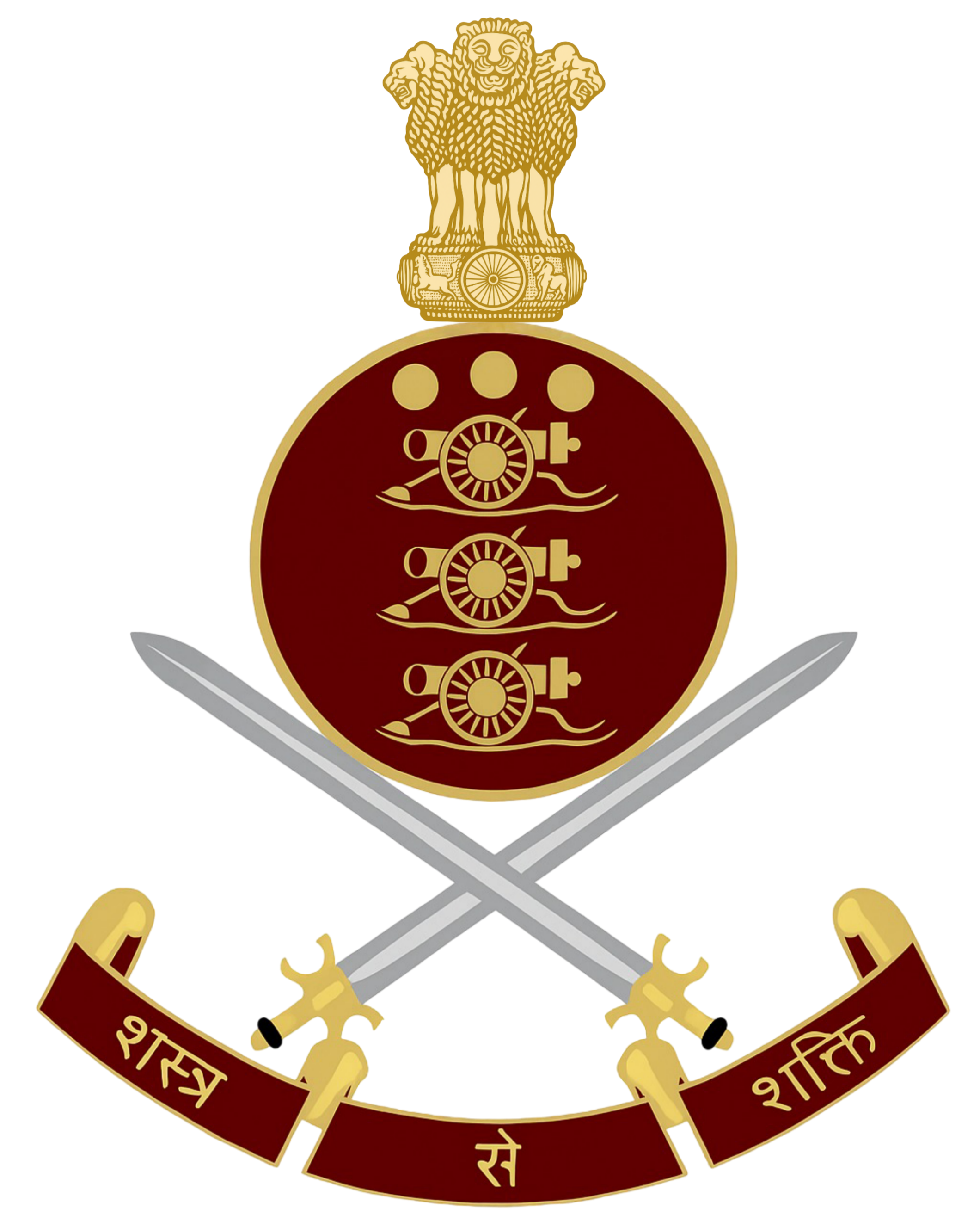
Army Ordnance Corps

Army Postal Service

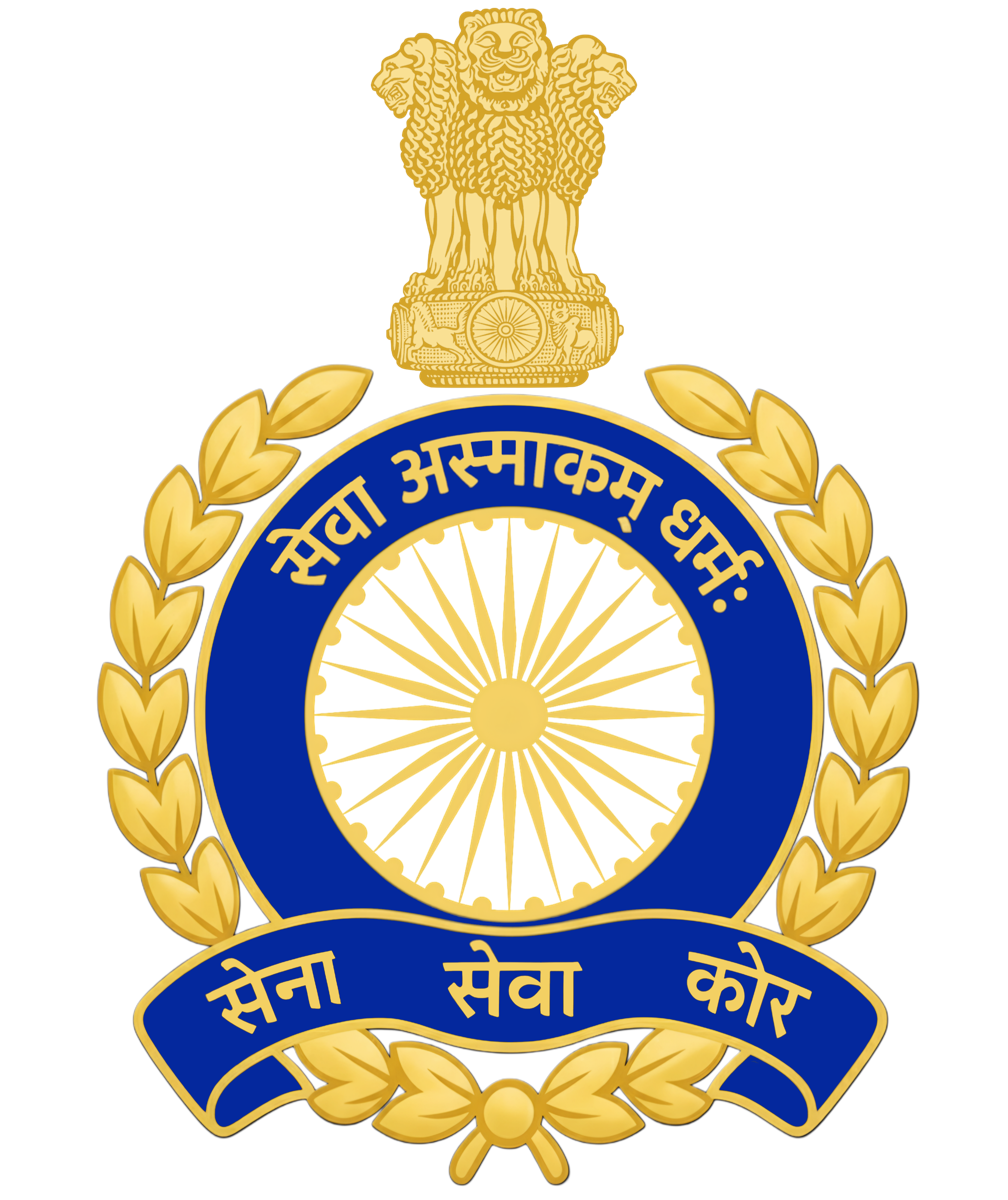
Army Service Corps

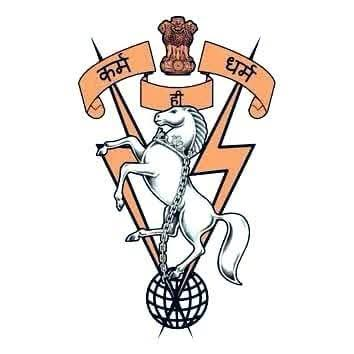
Corps of Electronic and Mechanical Engineers

Corps of Engineers

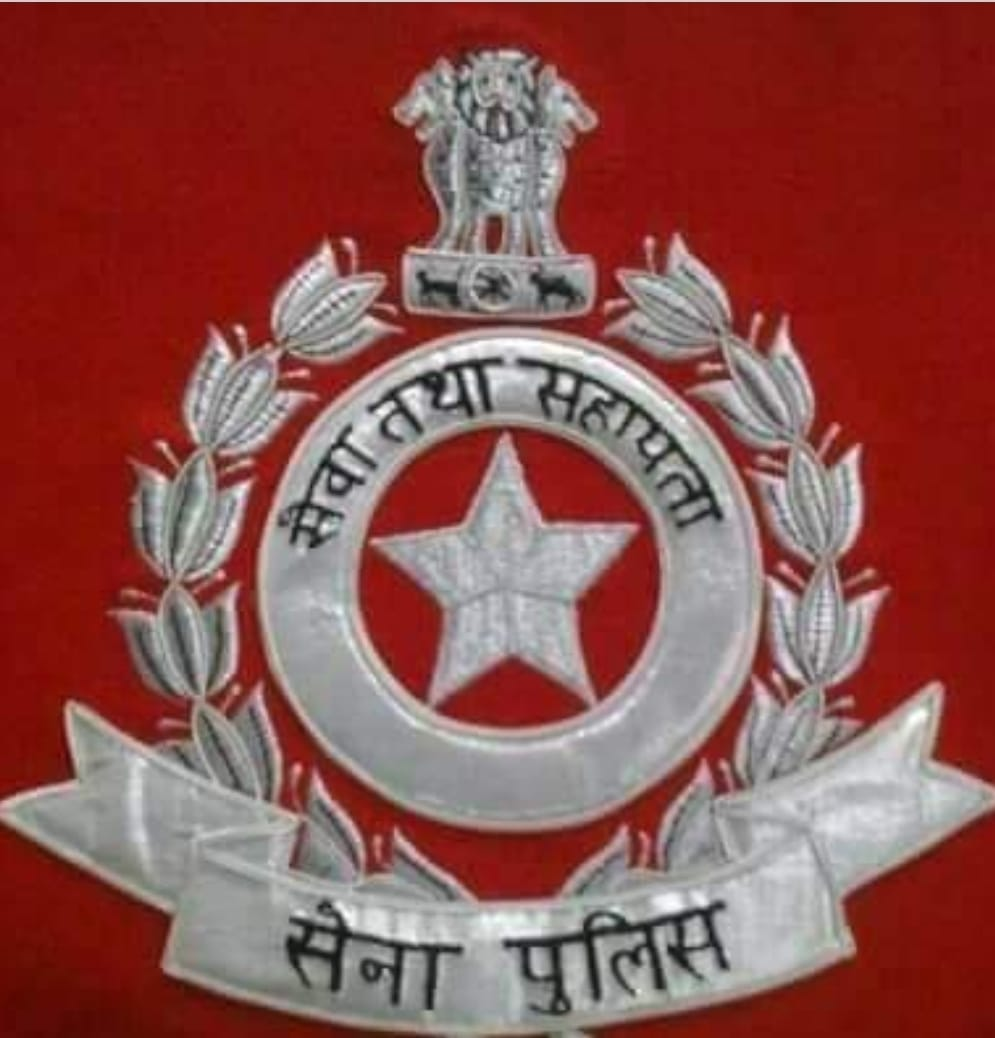
Corps of Military Police

Corps of Signals

Defence Security Corps

Directorate of Military Intelligence

Rashtriya Rifles

Regiment of Artillery

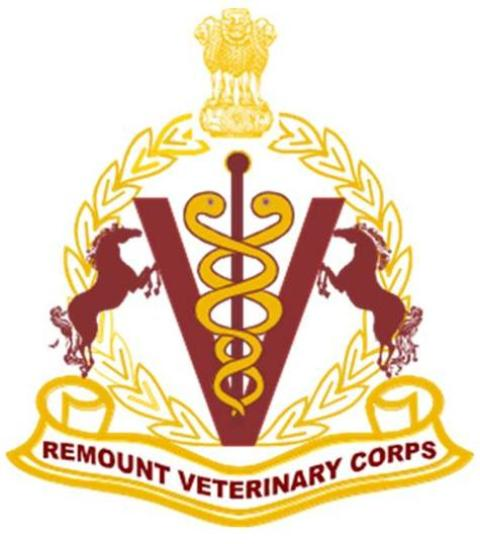
Remount and Veterinary Corps

== Related organisations ==
Assam Rifles

Territorial Army
