= Rajputana Rifles =

Rifle regiment of the Indian Army

- Regimental Insignia of the Rajputana Rifles
- Active: 10 January 1775; 251 years ago - present
- Country: India
- Branch: Indian Army
- Type: Line Infantry
- Role: Infantry
- Size: 26 battalions
- Part of: Western Command
- Garrison/HQ: Delhi Cantonment
- Nickname: Raj Rif
- Mottos: Veer Bhogya Vasundhara (Sanskrit) "The Brave Shall Inherit the Earth"
- Colors: (Dark Green, Black and Transport Red)
- Engagements: Indo-Pakistani War of 1971
- Battle honours: Poonch, Hajipir, Charwa, Basantar and Myanamati, Tololing

Commanders
- Colonel of the regiment: Lieutenant General Amardeep Singh Aujla
- Notable commanders: British Indian Army: General Sir James Outram, 1st Baronet; Major General Thomas Wynford Rees; Brigadier Geoffrey Beyts; Post-Independence: Lieutenant General Adi M. Sethna; Major General Kulwant Singh; Lieutenant General Kanwal Jeet Singh Dhillon

Insignia
- War Cry: Raja Ramchandra Ki Jai (राजा राम चंद्र की जय) "Victory to King Ramchandra"

The Rajputana Rifles is the oldest rifle regiment of the Indian Army, having been founded in 1775. It traces its origins to the British Indian Army, when six previously existing regiments were amalgamated to form six battalions of the 6th Rajputana Rifles. The regiment won several gallantry awards during World War I and World War II. In 1945, the numeral designation was dropped from the title. The regiment was transferred to the newly independent Indian Army in 1947.

Since India's independence, the regiment has been involved in a number of conflicts against Pakistan, as well as contributing to the Custodian Force (India) in Korea under the aegis of the United Nations in 1953–54 and to the UN Mission to the Congo in 1962. As a rifle regiment, it uses a bugle horn as its insignia, the same as the British Light Division, but unlike its British counterparts, the Rajputana Rifles march at the same march pace used in the Indian Army as a whole.

== Etymology ==
The name Rajputana Rifles is derived from the word Rajputana, a historic region in northwest India that is roughly coextensive with the modern Indian state of Rajasthan, as well as small sections of Madhya Pradesh and Gujarat. It is based on the Sanskrit word Rajaputra, meaning "son of a king", which finds mention in ancient Hindu scriptures such as the Rigveda, Ramayana, and Mahabharata. The name Rajputana means "land of the Rajputs".

== Recruitment ==
The Rajputana Rifles is a fixed class regiment with equal proportions of Rajputs and Jats and now under Agnipath Scheme all groups and caste are recruited.

== Lineage ==
The regiment's origins lie in the 18th century when the East India Company (EIC) recruited Rajputs to protect its operations. The impressive performance of French local units which were composed of local recruits mixed with French officers, helped the EIC to decide that it needed to do something similar. In January 1775, it raised its first local infantry units which included the 5th Battalion, Bombay Sepoys, which is considered to be the oldest rifle regiment of the Indian Army. The 5th Battalion was successively redesignated as 9th Battalion Bombay Sepoys in 1778; 2nd Battalion, 2nd Regiment of Bombay Native Infantry in 1796; 4th Regiment of Bombay Native Infantry in 1824, and then 4th Regiment Native Infantry (Rifle Corps) in 1881. It thus became the first rifle regiment of the British Indian Army. In 1899 the battalion was once more renamed as 4th Regiment (1st Battalion Rifle Corps) Bombay Infantry and again in 1901 as 4th Bombay Rifles.

In Kitchener's 1903 reorganisation of the Indian Army, 4th Bombay Rifles became 104th Wellesley's Rifles, to commemorate the fact that the regiment had been commanded in 1800 by Arthur Wellesley (later the Duke of Wellington). In the further re-organisation in 1921, the following six regiments were brought together to form the six battalions of the 6th Rajputana Rifles Regiment:

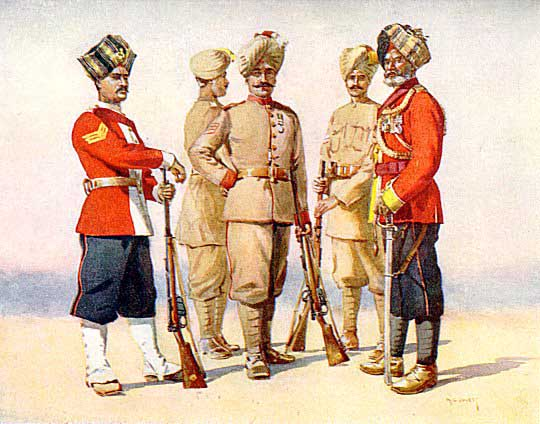
A painting depicting members of the Rajputanta Rifles, of all ranks and uniforms. c. 1911

- 1st Battalion - 104th Wellesley's Rifles
- 2nd Battalion - 120th Rajputana Infantry
- 3rd Battalion - 122nd Rajputana Infantry
- 4th Battalion - 123rd Outram's Rifles
- 5th Battalion - 125th Napier's Rifles
- 10th (Training) Battalion - 13th Rajputs (The Shekhawati Regiment).
- 18th Battalion - (Saurashtra Rifles)

In 1945, the regiments of the British Indian Army dropped the numeral in their titles and so the Rajputana Rifles assumed its current name. In 1947, after the partition of India, the regiment was allocated to the newly formed Indian Army. In 1949, the 1st battalion was transferred to the newly raised Brigade of the Guards, becoming the 3rd battalion, Brigade of the Guards.

== History ==
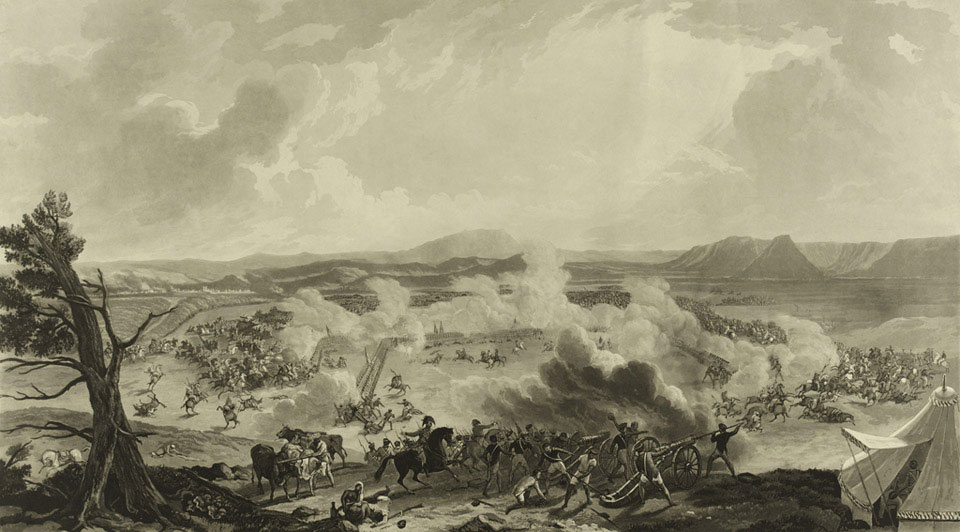
Battle of Khadki, 1817

In 1817, the 4th battalion met the Marathas at the Battle of Khadki. The defence earned the regiment the battle honor of "Khadki". In 1856–57 the 1st, 2nd, and 4th battalions were together in the Persian theatre of operations. In 1856, Captain John Augustus Wood of the 2nd battalion (then the 20th Bombay Native Infantry) was awarded the Victoria Cross for storming Bushire Fort. This was the first Victoria Cross to be won in an Indian unit. Sub. Maj Mohammed Sharief and Sub. Peer Bhatt were recommended for the Victoria Cross for their actions in the same battle, but were turned down as at that time the medal category was not open to Indians.

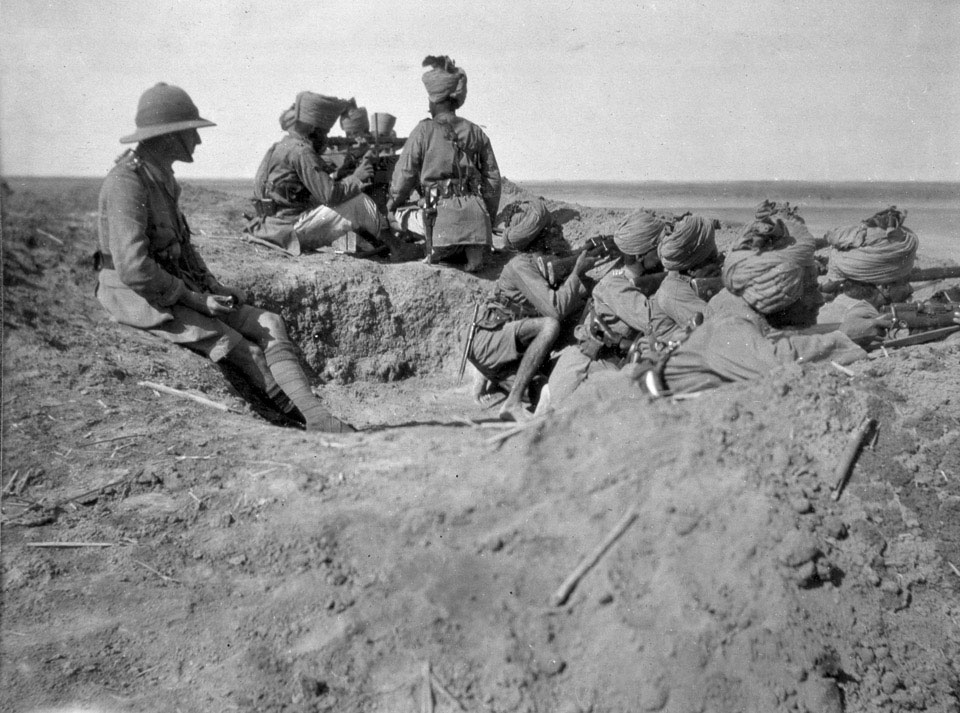
120th Rajputana Rifles man the firing lines in Mesopotamia, 1915

In 1878–1880, during the Second Afghan War, the 1st battalion marched 145 miles in 5 days from Quetta to Kandahar and laid siege to the city. In 1900–1902, the 3rd battalion was part of a force used to contain the Boxer Rebellion in China.

World War I saw the regiment fight in battlefields from France to Palestine. The 5th battalion was in all theatres of the war and participated in General Allenby’s march to recapture Jerusalem.

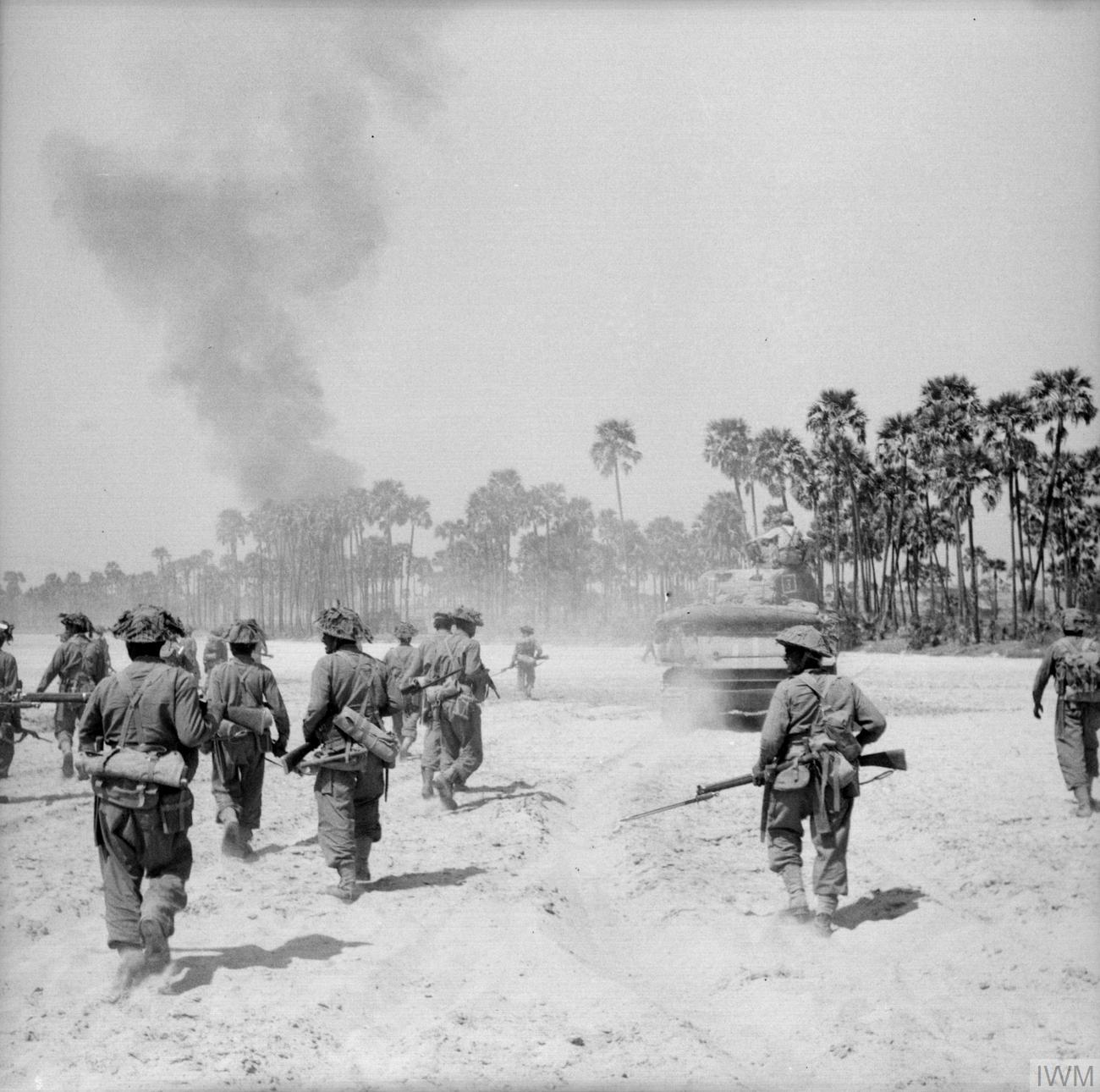
Men of the regiment during the Battle of Meiktila, Burma 1945

During World War II, the regiment was expanded to thirteen battalions and served in the Middle East, Burma and Malaya. The 4th battalion had the distinction of earning two Victoria Crosses during this conflict.

Over the course of its existence, members of the regiment have received four Victoria Crosses, 44 Military Crosses, one Param Vir Chakra, three Ashok Chakras, one Padma Bhushan, fourteen Param Vishisht Seva Medals, ten Maha Vir Chakras, eleven Kirti Chakras, 18 Ati Vishisht Seva Medals, two Uttam Yudh Seva Medal, 50 Vir Chakras, 28 Shaurya Chakras, 122 Sena Medals (including Bar), 39 Vishisht Seva Medals, three Yudh Seva Medals, 85 Mentions-in-Dispatches and 55 Arjuna Awards.

== Units ==
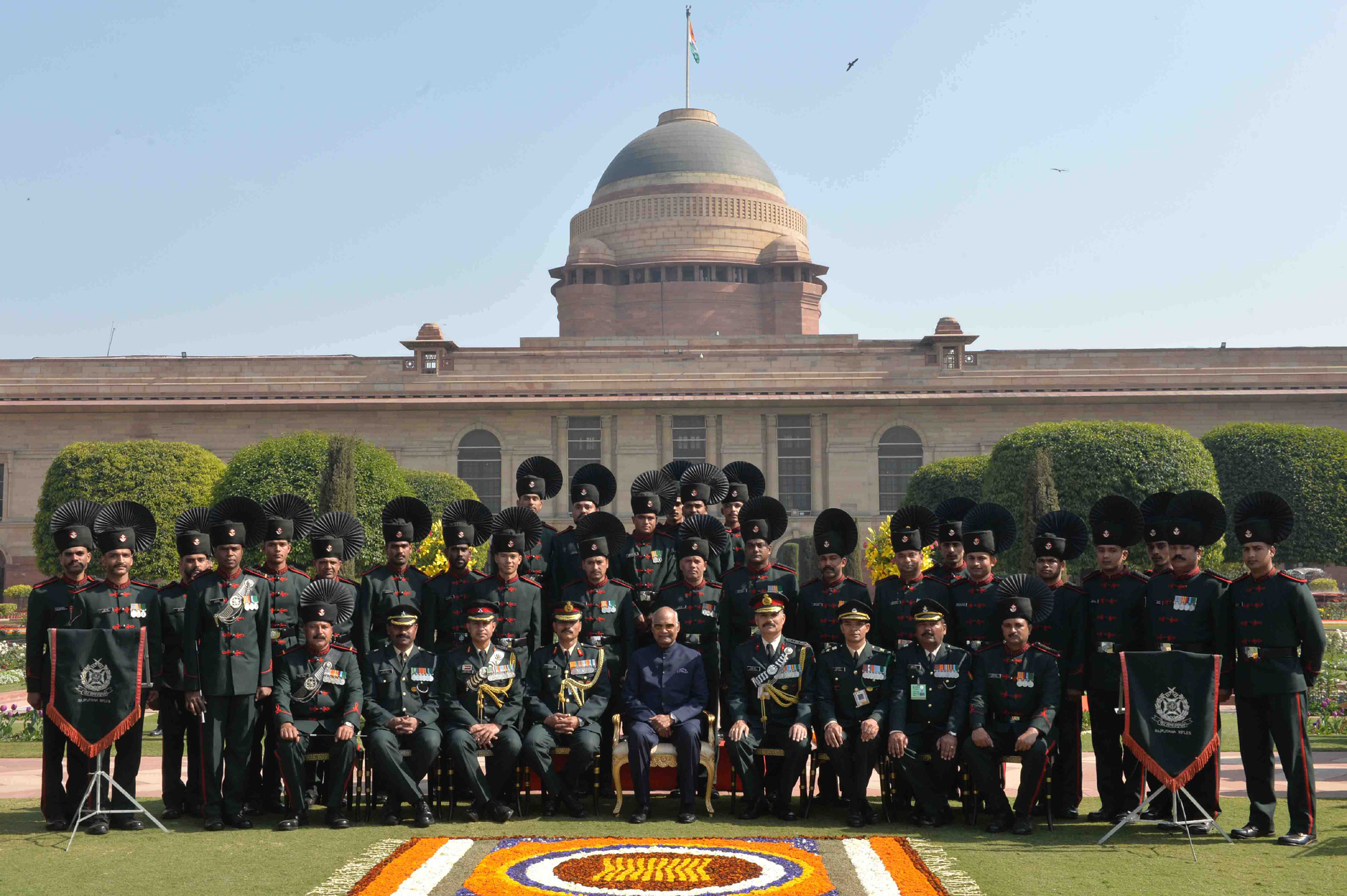
President Ram Nath Kovind with members of the Band of the Rajputana Rifles following the Beating Retreat, Rashtrapati Bhavan, 30 January 2018.

The Rajputana Rifles consists of twenty regular battalions, four Rashtriya Rifles battalions and two Territorial Army battalions -

Battalion	Raising Date	Remarks	References
1st Battalion §	1775	Raised as 5th Battalion, Bombay Sepoys. Converted to 3rd Battalion, Brigade of the Guards on 1 September 1949. Pre-independence : 28 battle honours, post-independence : battle honour Gadra Road	
2nd Battalion	1817	Raised as the 2nd Battalion, 10th Regiment of Bombay Native Infantry. Designated 120th Rajputana Infantry in 1903 and 2nd (Prince of Wales's Own), 6th Rajputana Rifles in 1922. Battle honours of Persia, Reshire, Bushire, Koosh-Ab, Mesopotamia, Shaiba, Kut-Al-Amara, and Ctesiphon. Captain John Augustus Wood won the Victoria Cross in 1856 at Bushire, Persia. Post independence battle honours – Poonch, Tololing and Drass; theatre honour – Kargil.	
3rd Battalion	1818	Raised as 2nd Battalion, 11th Regiment of Bombay Native Infantry. Underwent many name changes, was designated 122nd Rajputana Infantry, before present designation. Battle honours –China, Afghanistan, Basra and Shaiba, Kut-Al-Amra, Baghdad, Mesopotamia, Irrawady, Mandalay and Fort Dufferin. Theatre honours – Persia, Mesopotamia, Burma 1932-34, Burma 1944-45, Jammu & Kashmir and Rajasthan.	
4th Battalion (Outram's)	1820	Raised on 26 May 1820 from elements which took part in the Battle of Khadki in November 1817, as the First Battalion of the 12th Regiment of the East India Company Indian Army. In the reorganisation of 1903, it took on the name of Sir James Outram and was designated the 123rd Outram's Rifles. Won two Victoria Crosses (Subedar Richhpal Ram and CHM Chhelu Ram), and 23 Battle/Theatre Honours during the pre-independence period. Post-Independence battle honours – Charwa and Uri, theatre honour Punjab 1965.	
5th Battalion (Napier's)	1820	Raised as 1st Extra Battalion of Bombay Native Infantry, underwent many changes, designated 125th Napier's Rifles in 1903 and present designation in 1945. Won one Victoria Cross in 1858 and 27 battle honours before independence.	
6th Battalion	1962	Nicknamed the Param Vir Chakra Paltan and Shooting Sixth, the regiment was raised in 1940 by Lieutenant Colonel NG Gane MC at Faizabad. Theatre honour Burma during World War II. CHM Piru Singh was awarded the PVC during the Indo-Pakistani War of 1947–1948. The battalion was awarded the theatre honour Jammu and Kashmir and battle honour Darapari.	
7th Battalion	1962	Raised 1941, fought in Malaya, disbanded at the end of war. Re-raised in 1962 at Delhi Cantonment. Battle honour Mynamati and theatre honour East Pakistan, 1971.	
8th Battalion	1963	Raised in 1941 and saw action in the Arakan Campaign, battle honour Rathedaung, disbanded 1947. Re-raised by Lieutenant Colonel JJ Lal in Delhi.	
9th Battalion	1964	Raised 1941 at Nasirabad, converted to an anti-aircraft regiment, disbanded 1945. Re-raised at Delhi Cantonment by Lieutenant Colonel C Silva.	
11th Battalion	1964	Raised by Lieutenant Colonel Risal Singh at Kanchrapara. Havildar Rajesh Kumar was posthumously awarded the Ashoka Chakra in 2010.	
12th Battalion	1968	Raised as 31 Rajputana Rifles on 15 January 1968 and re-designated as 12 Rajputana Rifles on 23 February 1971. Theatre honour : East Pakistan, 1971.	
13th Battalion	1966	Raised as the New Delhi by Lieutenant Colonel Jai Singh SM. Nicknamed Thundering Thirteen.	
14th Battalion	1966	Raised as 11 Rajputana Rifles (TA), disbanded 1947, re-raised 1966 by Lieutenant Colonel Harbhajan Singh at Golconda. Nicknamed Fighting Fourteen.	
15th Battalion	1976		
16th Battalion	1979		
17th Battalion	1934	Former Imperial Service Troops, raised as Sawai Man Guards of Jaipur State Forces, battle honour Ledi Gali during 1948 operations, absorbed into Indian Army in 1951.	
18th Battalion §	1941?	Former Saurashtra Rifles, (Nawanagar State Forces); now 11th Mechanised Infantry Regiment. Battle honours Asal Uttar and Basantar.	
19th Battalion	1962	Raised at Delhi Cantonment by Lieutenant Colonel SP Kutky. Captain Ummed Singh Mahra was posthumously awarded the Ashoka Chakra in 1971. Awarded theatre honour East Pakistan, 1971.	
20th Battalion	1981	Raised on 1 January 1981 at Delhi Cantonment by Lieutenant Colonel Satvir Singh. Has taken part in Operation Blue Star, Operation Pawan and counter-insurgency operations.	
21st Battalion	1985		
22nd Battalion			
23rd Battalion §		Converted to 23rd Battalion, Parachute Regiment in 2013	
24th Battalion			
2 Bhairav Battalion	2025		
9 Rashtriya Rifles	1994		
18 Rashtriya Rifles	1994		
43 Rashtriya Rifles	2005?		
57 Rashtriya Rifles			
105 (TA) Battalion	1949	Delhi Cantonment, New Delhi; nicknamed Rajputana Terriers	
128 (TA) Battalion	1983	Eco - Jaisalmer, Rajasthan	

§ indicates former units.

== Alliances ==
- United Kingdom - The 22nd (Cheshire) Regiment; 5th Battalion

== Rajputana Rifles Regimental Museum ==
The Rajputana Rifles Regimental Museum in the Rajputana Rifles Centre is located inside the Delhi Cantonment. The museum covers the rich history of the regiment in the most modern fashion. The museum is around 7000 square feet in size and covers the history of the regiment from its inception. The museum exhibits weapons and uniforms and narrates the history through large format images and audiovisual film. The museum was designed and conceived by Holistic Design a Delhi-based design studio headed by Nikhil Bhardwaj who specializes in designing museums and exhibitions. Col. M. S. Niranjan of the 19th battalion was the director of the museum project. It is rated as the finest military museum in India and even compared to the Imperial War Museum in London.

== Battle Honours ==
Pre Independence

- Mysore
- Seringapatam
- Bourbon
- Kirkee 1817
- Beni Boo Alli
- Meeanee 1843
- Hyderabad 1843
- Aliwal 1846
- Mooltan
- Punjaub
- Reshire
- Bushire 1856
- Koosh-Ab
- Persia
- Central India
- Abyssinia
- Kandahar 1880
- Chitral
- Afghanistan 1878–80
- Burma 1885–87
- British East Africa
- China 1900
- Afghanistan 1919
- Givenchy 1914
- Neuve Chapelle
- Aubers
- Festubert 1915
- France and Flanders 1914–15
- Egypt 1915
- Gaza
- Nebi Samwil
- Jerusalem
- Tell 'Asur
- Megiddo
- Sharon
- Palestine 1917–18
- Basra
- Shaiba
- Kut al Amara 1915
- Ctesiphon
- Defence of Kut al Amara
- Tigris 1916
- Baghdad
- Mesopotamia 1914–18
- Persia 1918
- East Africa 1914
- Abyssinia 1941
- Syria 1941
- North Africa 1940–43
- Italy 1943–45
- Malaya 1941–42
- Burma 1942–1945

Post Independence

- Punch
- Asal Uttar
- Charwa
- J&K 1965
- Basantar
- Mynamati
- Tololing
- Drass

== Gallantry awards (Pre-independence) ==
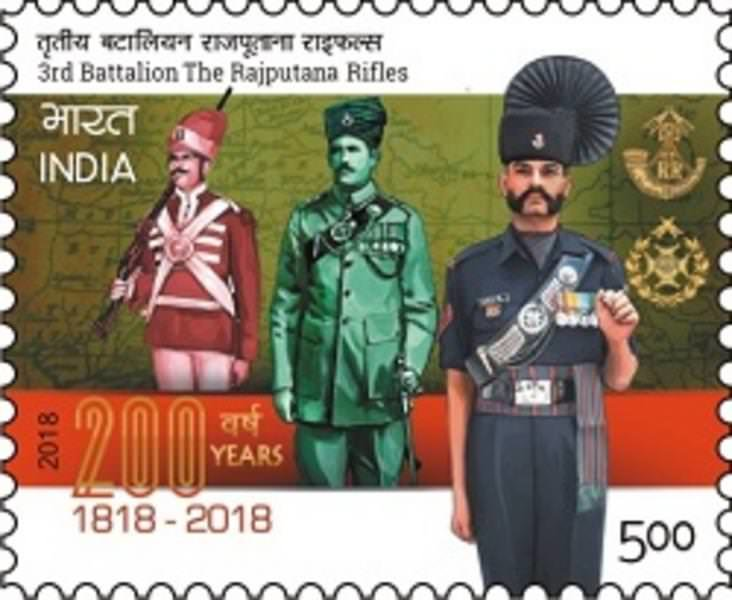
Postage stamp released in 2018 to commemorate the Bicentenary of the Third Battalion of Rajputana Rifles.

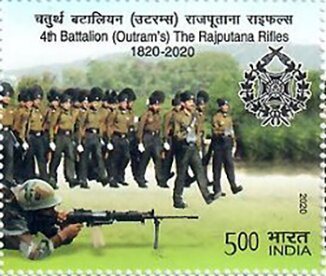
Postage stamp released in 2020 to commemorate the Bicentenary of the Fourth Battalion of Rajputana Rifles.

Pre-1914

Victoria Cross

- Captain John Augustus Wood, 20th Bombay Native Infantry
- Lieutenant William Francis Frederick Waller, 24th Bombay Native Infantry

1914-1921
Companion of the Order of the Indian Empire

- Captain Edwin James Mollison, 125th Napier's Rifles

Military Cross

- Captain W. Odell, 123rd Outram's Rifles - attached 125th Napier Rifles
- Lieutenant C. F. F. Moore, 123rd Outram's Rifles - attached 4th Gurkha Rifles
- Lieutenant Charles Oliver Robins Mosse, 120th Rajputana Infantry
- Lieutenant John Bell Nelson, 125th Napier's Rifles
- Subedar Harnath Singh, 1st Battalion, 123rd Outram's Rifles (Egypt)

Order of British India

- Subedar Parbhudhan Singh, 13th Rajputs (The Shekhawatti Regiment), (East Africa)
- Subedar Major Hassan Muhammad, 104th Wellesley's Rifles (Kut-Al-Amara)
- Subedar Harchant Jat, 104th Wellesley's Rifles (Kut-Al-Amara)
- Subedar Major Khitab Gul, 120th Rajputana Infantry (Mesopotamia)
- Subedar Sri Bahadur Singh, 120th Rajputana Infantry (Mesopotamia)
- Subedar Indar Singh, 120th Rajputana Infantry (Kut-Al-Amara)
- Acting Subedar Major Abdul Shakur Khan, 122nd Rajputana Infantry (Mesopotamia)
- Subedar Major Umar Din, 125th Napier's Rifles (France)
- Subedar Nizam-ud-din, 125th Napier's Rifles (Egypt)

Indian Order of Merit

- Subedar Bakhtawar Singh, 13th Rajputs (The Shekhawatti Regiment), (East Africa)
- Subedar Sabal Singh, Naik Net Singh, Lance Naik Guman Singh, Rifleman Kheta Ram, Rifleman Dhanna Ram, Rifleman Maula Dad, Naik Narsu Singh, Rifleman Manji Singh, Naik Malik Khan, Subedar Mukh Ram, Colour Havildar Ganpat Singh, Havildar Allahditta (Mesopotamia), Subedar Tiku Ram (Kut-Al-Amara); all from 104th Wellesley's Rifles
- Subedar Dunga Rawat, Sepoy Hukam Singh, Colour Havildar Ganesh Ram, Sepoy Lachhman Singh, Sepoy Kum Singh, Subedar Major Khitab Gul, Havildar Girwar, (Mesopotamia), Havildar Uhet Singh, Jemadar Nara, (Kut-Al-Amara); all from 120th Rajputana Infantry
- Subedar Harnath Singh, Jemadar Bhim Singh, Subedar Major Bhura Ram, Jemadar Hans Ram, Jemadar Arjun Ram, Jemadar Nanig Ram, Naik Amir Hussain, (Egypt), Jemadar Mubarik Ali, (attached 58th Rifles) all from 123rd Outram's Rifles
- Rifleman Bal Singh, Jemadar Munshi Singh, Havildar Sher Khan, Rifleman Goru Ram, Lance Naik Feroz Khan, (Mesopotamia), Subedar Major Jahan Shah, Rifleman Sukh Singh, Colour Havildar Rahim Ali, Subedar Nizam-ud-din, Jemadar Sheobaksh Singh, (Egypt), all from 125th Napier's Rifles

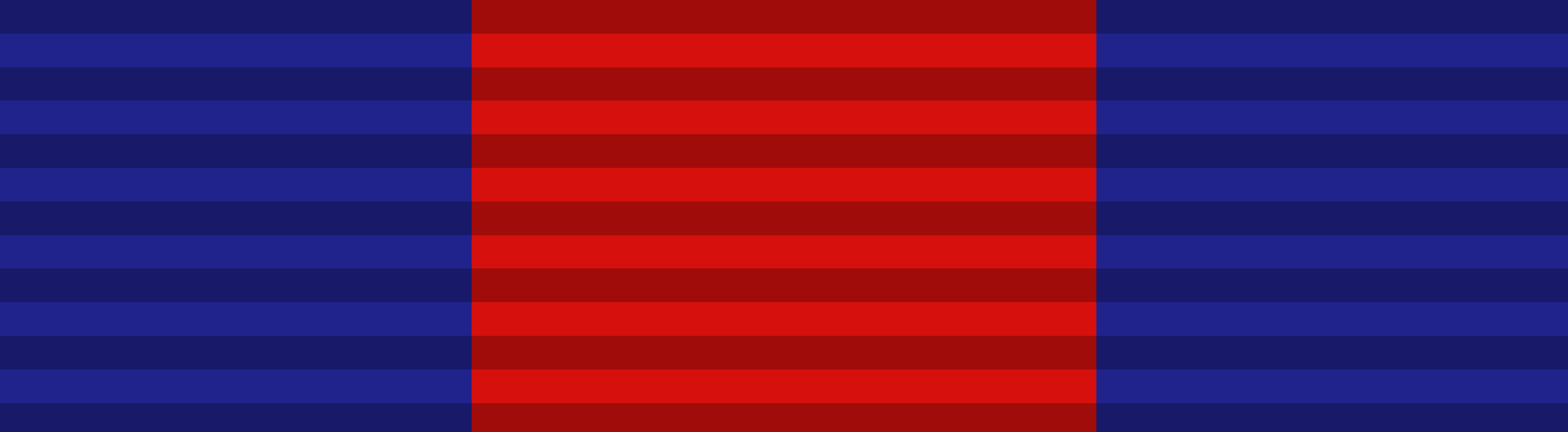
Indian Distinguished Service Medal

- World War I - 3 medals (13th Rajputs (The Shekhawatti Regiment)), 20 medals (104th Wellesley's Rifles), 21 medals (120th Rajputana Infantry), 2 medals (122nd Rajputana Infantry), 16 medals (123rd Outram's Rifles), 18 medals (125th Napier's Rifles)

Indian Meritorious Service Medal

- World War I - 10 medals (13th Rajputs (The Shekhawatti Regiment)), 26 medals (104th Wellesley's Rifles), 6 medals (120th Rajputana Infantry), 5 medals (122nd Rajputana Infantry), 51 medals (123rd Outram's Rifles), 46 medals (125th Napier's Rifles)

Croix De Guerre (French)

- Subedar Major Hasan Muhammad, Subedar Mukh Ram (France), 104th Wellesley's Rifles; Subedar Major Khitab Gil (France) 120th Rajputana Infantry

Leim Alilimdetaire (French)

- Naik Jema Baksh (Egypt) 120th Rajputana Infantry; Colour Havildar Allahbad Khan (Mesopotamia), 125th Napier's Rifles

Medaille d'Honneur avec Glaives en Bronze (French)

- Subedar Major Bhura Ram, 123rd Outram's Rifles; CQMH Madat Khan, 125th Napier's Rifles

1921-1939
Officer of the Most Excellent Order of the British Empire

- Captain John Allan Ferguson, 13th Rajputs
- Major Robert Denis Ambrose, 1st Battalion (Wellesley's), 6th Rajputana Rifles

Member of the Most Excellent Order of the British Empire

- Major Harold James Huxford, 5th Battalion, 6th Rajputana Rifles (Napiers)

Distinguished Service Order

- Lieutenant Colonel John Duncan Grant, 13th Rajputs

Military Cross

- Lieutenant Geoffrey Herbert Bruno Beyts, 3rd Battalion, 6th Rajputana Rifles
- Lieutenant Roy Edward Percy Wyndham, 3rd Battalion, 6th Rajputana Rifles
- Lieutenant Richard Harold Robert Alderman, 4th Battalion (Outram's), 6th Rajputana Rifles

1939-1947
Victoria Cross

- Company Havildar-Major Chhelu Ram - Victoria Cross, 4th Battalion, 6th Rajputana Rifles
- Subedar Richhpal Ram, 4th Battalion, 6th Rajputana Rifles

Distinguished Service Order

- Lieutenant Colonel Geoffrey Herbert Bruno Beyts, Lieutenant Colonel PRH Skrine, Lieutenant Colonel WAL James, Lieutenant Colonel R Lawrenson, Lieutenant Colonel RB Scott, Lieutenant Colonel L Jones, Lieutenant J. McHadden, Major (temporary) John Lewis Haycroft Davis, Lieutenant-Colonel (acting) George Edgar Parker.

Officer of the Most Excellent Order of the British Empire

- Brigadier (acting) Victor George Joseph Barton, Lieutenant-Colonel (Temporary Brigadier) Franz Reginald Lindsay Goadb, Major Brevet Lieutenant-Colonel Herbert James Sheppard, Colonel (temporary) Bertram Bayliss, Lieutenant-Colonel (local) George Roy Stevens, Major RB Broadbent, *Major Chand Narain Das

Member of the Most Excellent Order of the British Empire

- Lieutenant Colonel (temporary) Denis Gill Ryan, Major (temporary Lieutenant-Colonel) Claude Morgan Hutchings, Major (temporary) Alan Philip Young, Major (temporary) David Ralph Morgan, Captain Alan Stuart Roger, Captain DL Powell Jones, Captain (temporary) John Lewis Warren, Captain (Temporary) Liaqat Saeed Khan Lodi, Captain (temporary Major) George Edgar Parker, Captain (temporary) Harold Anthony Burke, Captain Stanley Broadbent, Major (temporary) Abdul Rashid Choudhri, Captain (temporary) Ghulam Nabi Jemadar Farman Ali.

Military Cross

- Major (temporary) Leslie Louis Fleming, Major (temporary) Geoffrey Arthur Hasler, Major (temporary) George Edgar Parker, Major (temporary) John Keith Parry, Major (acting) John Campbell Anderson, Major (temporary) Hubert Michael Close, Captain GE Charter, Captain Mian Khan, Captain CE Cayley, Captain GR Riddick, Captain KR Gentles, Captain Ivan Bernard St. Regis Surita, Captain JRM French, Captain EW Dixon, Captain AT Murray, Captain Dinesh Chandra Misra, Captain (temporary) John Michael Beamish, Lieutenant Geoffrey Earle Dubois, Lieutenant Daljit Singh Randhawa, Captain (temporary) Ivon Charles Jameson, Lieutenant (temporary Captain) Edward Wilberforce Dixon, 2nd Lieutenant NL Kapur, 2nd Lieutenant Bashir Ahmed, Captain Alexander Hendrick Roosmale Cocq, Lieutenant Gilbert Llewellyn Young-Western, Lieutenant Denis Oswald O'Leary, 2nd Lieutenant JM Ashworth, 2nd Lieutenant PK Horwood, Lieutenant (temporary Captain) Sworup Singh Kalaan, Subedar Tota Ram, Subedar Kesari Singh, Jemadar Sanwal Ram, Jemadar Kalu Ram, Subedar Kalyan Singh, Jemadar (acting Subedar) Usman Ghani, Jemadar Anwar Beg.

Indian Order of Merit, 1st Class

- Subedar Niaz Ali Khan

Indian Order of Merit

- Subedar Jiwan Ram, Subedar Akbar Khan, Subedar Mohammed Yusuf, Jemadar Bohita Ram, Jemadar Bhura Ram, Jemadar Jailal Ram, Havildar Mohammed Akbar, Havildar Hardewa Ram, Havildar Fatteh Khan, Havildar Durjan Singh, Naik Dost Mohammed, Rifleman Dharam Singh Ram, Jemadar Hoshiar Singh, Havildar Bhima Ram, Subedar Bostan Khan, Subedar Amar Singh, Jemadar Jagna Ram, Jemadar Niaz Ali Khan, Havildar Ganpat Ram, Havildar Habib Khan, Havildar Sheodan Singh, Havildar Goru Ram, Havildar Bhagirath Singh, Naik Bhopal Singh, L/Naik Anop Singh, L/Naik Bhaira Ram, L/Naik Mahji Khan, Subedar Barisal Singh, Naik Binja Ram, Subadar-Major Narain Singh.

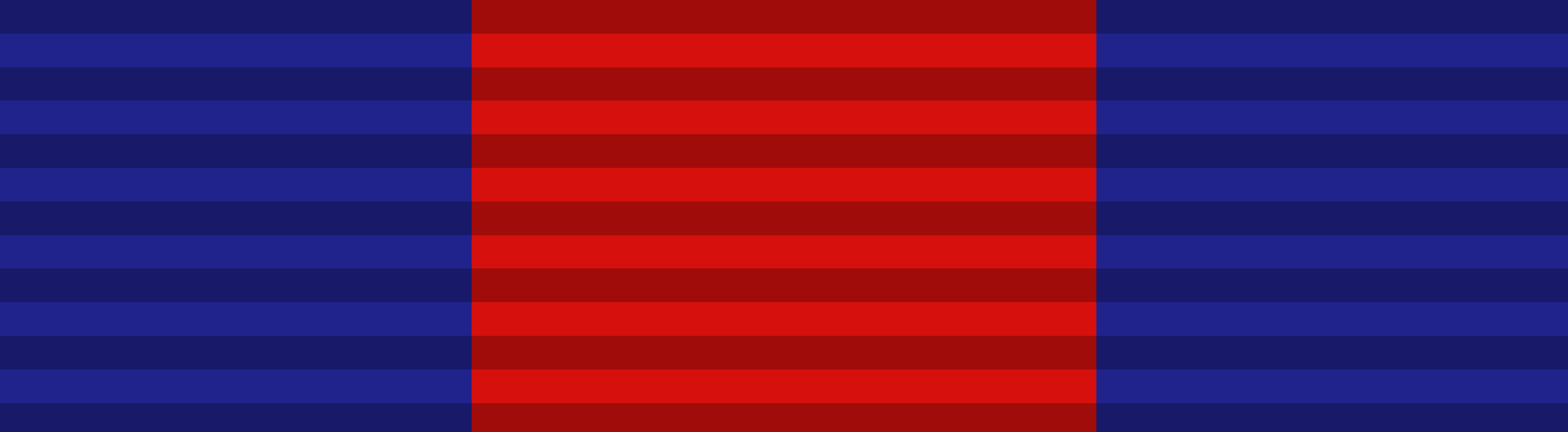
Indian Distinguished Service Medal

- Subedar Sukh Ram, Subedar Govinda Ram, Jemadar Gopichand Ram, Jemadar Bhagwana Ram, Jemadar Lall Khan, Jemadar Jita Ram, Jemadar Bhopal Singh, Jemadar Gurdial Ram, Havildar Panna Ram, Havildar Mull Singh, Havildar Inayat Khan, Havildar Phula Ram, Havildar Ratti Ram, Havildar Mohammed Niwaz, Havildar Atta Mohammed, Havildar Juglal Ram, Havildar Neki Ram, Naik Bhagwana Ram, Naik Ramnath Ram, Naik Hem Singh, Naik Begraj Ram, Naik Het Ram, Naik Mohammed Inayat Ali, Lance-Naik Jagat Singh, Lance-Naik Chandgi Ram, Lance-Naik Bega Ram, Lance-Naik Kasi Ram, Lance-Naik Khushi Mohammed, Lance-Naik Kalyan Singh, Rifleman Nandkaran Ram, Rifleman Puran Ram, Rifleman Mangal Singh, Rifleman Fidda Huissain, Rifleman Mohammed Yusuf, Rifleman Harsukh Ram, Jemadar Hoshiar Singh, Havildar Bhima Ram, Subedar Peroze Khan, Jemadar Gulab Khan, Jemadar Harnarain Ram, Jemadar Jowahir Singh, Havildar Harnath Singh, Havildar Sardara Ram, Naik Suba Khan, Nail Khema Ram, L/Naik Kara Ram, L/Naik Sagat Singh, Rifleman Dipa Ram, Rifleman Jiwan Singh, Rifleman Mumphal Ram, Rifleman Sobh Singh, Rifleman Amilal Ram, Rifleman Sanwat Singh, Havildar Chatterbui Singh, Havildar Punjraj Singh, Naik Dalpat Singh, Subedar Sardar Khan, Havildar Bhopsingh Ram, Company Havildar-Major (acting) Sheodayal Singh, Sepoy (acting Naik) Hak Ram, Lance-Naik Jugal Singh.

Military Medal

- Naik Mohd Khan, Naik Fasal Hussain, Naik Jhuntha Ram, Lance-Naik Abdul Rehman, Sweeper Wazir, Rifleman Mohd Sharif, Rifleman Parmeshwar Singh, Rifleman Zaman Ali, Naik Kishan Singh, Naik Megh Singh, Naik (Acting) Lal Singh, Lance-Naik Karam Ellahi, Naik Chuni Ram, Company Havildar-Major Jisukh Ram, Havildar Himta Ram, Naik Kana Ram, Lance-Naik Zarif Khan, Company Havildar-Major Naurang Ram, Rifleman Khuda Dad, Rifleman Ramkunwar Singh, Rifleman Sheochand Ram, Naik Qaim Khan.

British Empire Medal

- Lance-Naik Dusera Ram, Havildar-Major Mir Badshah, Rifleman Mehraj Din

Gold Cross of Merit

- Lieutenant-Colonel Julius Benois Edwardes

Mentioned in dispatches

- 87 numbers

== Gallantry awards (Post-independence) ==
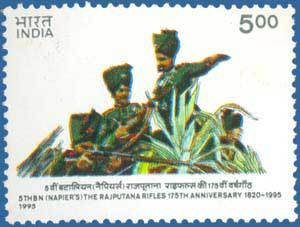
Postage stamp released in 1995 to commemorate 175 years of the Fifth Battalion of Rajputana Rifles.

Param Vir Chakra

- Company Havildar Major Piru Singh, 6th Battalion, Rajputana Rifles

Ashok Chakra

- Havildar Rajesh Kumar, 11th Battalion, Rajputana Rifles
- Captain Ummed Singh Mahra, 19th Battalion, Rajputana Rifles
- Naik Neeraj Kumar Singh, 13th Battalion, Rajputana Rifles

Maha Vir Chakra

- Major General Swarup Singh Kalaan, MC, Rajputana Rifles
- Lieutenant Colonel (later Brigadier) Raghubir Singh Rajawat, 18th Battalion, Rajputana Rifles
- Lieutenant Ved Prakash Trehan, 4th Battalion, Rajputana Rifles
- Rifleman Dhonkal Singh, 6th Battalion, Rajputana Rifles
- Naik Sugan Singh, 7th Battalion, Rajputana Rifles
- Major Padmapani Acharya, 2nd Battalion, Rajputana Rifles
- Major Vivek Gupta, 2nd Battalion, Rajputana Rifles
- Naik Digendra Kumar, 2nd Battalion, Rajputana Rifles
- Captain Neikezhakuo Kenguruse, 2nd Battalion, Rajputana Rifles

Kirti Chakra

- Lieutenant Colonel Kamaldeep Singh, 18 RR, Rajputana Rifles
- Captain (Later Colonel) Karni Singh Rathore, 17th Battalion, Rajputana Rifles (Sawaiman Guards)
- Captain Ashutosh Kumar, 5th Battalion, Rajputana Rifles
- Havildar Amar Singh, 17th Battalion, Rajputana Rifles
- Naib Subedar Umaid Singh, 6th Battalion, Rajputana Rifles
- Naik Rajinder Singh, 2nd Battalion, Rajputana Rifles
- Major Pushpender Singh (on deputation to 28 Assam Rifles)
- Lance Naik Hoshiar Singh, 6th Battalion, Rajputana Rifles (Sawaiman Guards)
- Major Aditya Pratap Singh (on deputation to Assam Rifles)

Vir Chakra

- Lieutenant Colonel Mahabir Singh, 2nd Battalion, Rajputana Rifles
- Major Balbir Singh Poonia, 7th Battalion, Rajputana Rifles
- Major Rajender Singh Rajawat, 18th Battalion, Rajputana Rifles
- Major Ram Swarup Sharma, Rajputana Rifles
- Major (later Brigadier) Jitendra Kumar Tomar, 9th Battalion, Rajputana Rifles
- Captain Vijayant Thapar, 2nd Battalion, Rajputana Rifles
- Colonel Magod Basappa Ravindranath, 2nd Battalion, Rajputana Rifles
- Major Mohit Saxena, 2nd Battalion, Rajputana Rifles
- Captain Mohammed Haneef Uddin, 11th Battalion, Rajputana Rifles
- Subedar Rajab Ali, 8th Battalion, Rajputana Rifles
- Naib Subedar Mangej Singh, 11th Battalion, Rajputana Rifles
- Jemadar Sanwal Ram, 6th Battalion, Rajputana Rifles
- Havildar Hazari Singh, 6th Battalion, Rajputana Rifles
- Naik Sheo Chand Ram, 2nd Battalion, Rajputana Rifles
- Lance Naik Prem Singh, 12th Battalion, Rajputana Rifles
- CHM Yashvir Singh, 2nd Battalion, Rajputana Rifles
- Havildar Prem Kumar Chauhan, 5th Battalion, Rajputana Rifles
- Rifleman Rewat Singh, 6th Battalion, Rajputana Rifles
- Rifleman Mathan Singh, 2nd Battalion, Rajputana Rifles
- Rifleman Mohan Singh, 11th Battalion, Rajputana Rifles
- Rifleman Jai Ram Singh, 2nd Battalion, Rajputana Rifles
- Rifleman Mahilal Singh, 4th Battalion, Rajputana Rifles
- Rifleman Chagan Singh, 12th Battalion, Rajputana Rifles

Shaurya Chakra

- Lance Naik Ayyub Ali, 9 RR, Rajputana Rifles
- Naib Subedar Lal Singh Khichi, 57 RR, Rajputana Rifles
- Lance Naik Deshpal Singh, 9 RR, Rajputana Rifles
- Rifleman Lakshman Singh, 9 RR, Rajputana Rifles
- Havildar Hanuman Ram Saran, 18 RR, Rajputana Rifles
- Rifleman Mukesh Kumar, 9 RR, Rajputana Rifles
- Havildar Bhim Singh, 7 RR, Rajputana Rifles
- Lance Naik Narender Sindhu, 9 RR, Rajputana Rifles

== See also ==
- Rajput Regiment
- List of regiments of the Indian Army
