= 125th Napier's Rifles =

5th Battalion, the Rajputana Rifles
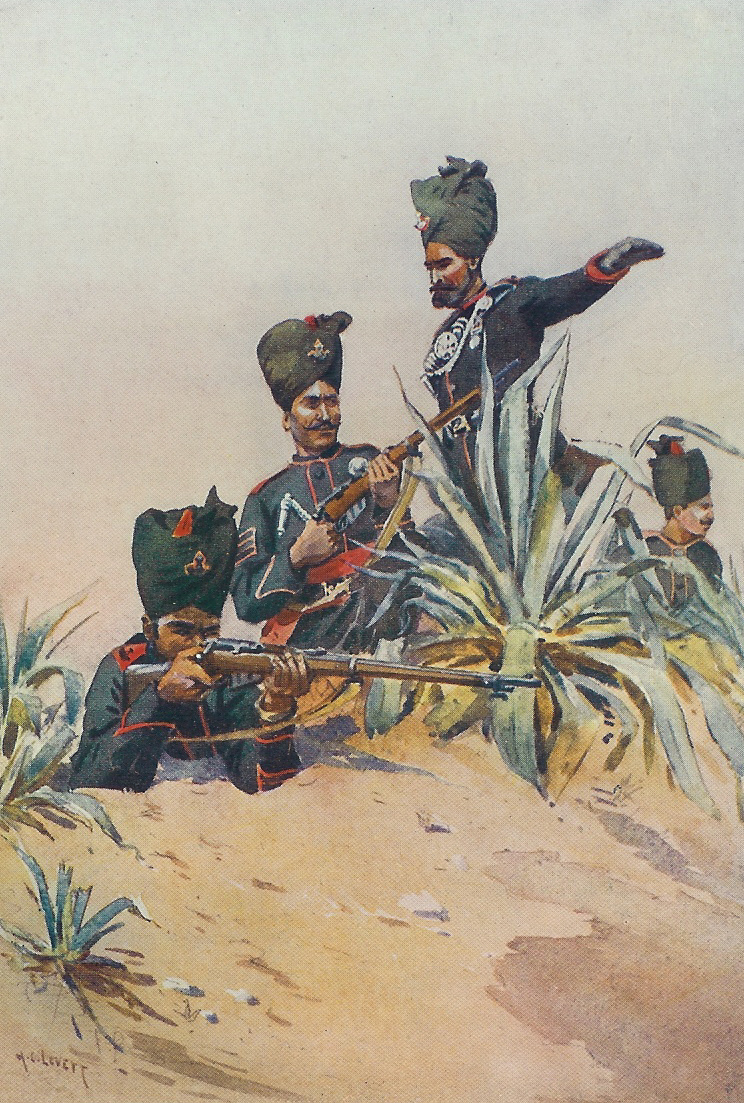
- Four Punjabi Muslims of the 125th Napier's Rifles, by A. C. Lovett (1911)
- Active: 1820–1922
- Country: Indian Empire
- Branch: Army
- Type: Infantry
- Part of: Bombay Army (to 1895); Bombay Command
- Colors: Red; faced pale yellow, 1882 yellow 1890Green; faced red, 1898 scarlet
- Anniversaries: 14 February, Battle Honour Day
- Engagements: Meanee, Hyderabad, Central India, Abyssinia, Burma 1885-87

Commanders
- Notable commanders: Col. H.V. Singh

The 125th Napier's Rifles, currently known as the 5th Battalion, Rajputana Rifles was an infantry regiment of the British Indian Army. At various points in history it was also known as the 1st Extra Battalion Bombay Native Infantry, the 25th Regiment of Bombay Native Infantry (1826–1889) and the 25th Bombay Rifles. Amalgamated with five other regiments in 1922, it is now the 5th Battalion, Rajputana Rifles. The Battalion celebrated its bicentenary on 17 Feb 2020. The Battalion is now known as 5th Battalion the Rajputana Rifles (Napiers) or 5 RAJ RIF. The Battalion is presently being commanded

== History ==
=== Origins ===
The regiment traced its origins to the 1st Extra Battalion of Bombay Native Infantry, raised in 1820 out of the Poona Auxiliary Force as part of the Honourable East India Company's Bombay Army. In 1826, this battalion was elevated into a separate regiment called 'The 25th Regiment of Bombay Native Infantry'.

After serving in Afghanistan and in the North-West Frontier Province, the regiment joined the Sindh Expedition, coming under the command of General Sir Charles James Napier, who conquered Sindh in 1843 and sent back to the Governor General the one-word message "Peccavi" – Latin for "I have sinned". This proved to be a story invented by sixteen-year-old Catherine Winkworth, which her governess sent to Punch magazine, where it was published as a humorous anecdote. (see https://www.vaguelyinteresting.co.uk/i-have-sinned-2/ ) At the Battle of Meeanee, a bond was cemented between Napier and the regiment, which sixty years later was given his name. Napier later wrote: "The 25th played a distinguished part in the engagement. Had the 22nd (The Queen's Regiment) and the 25th given way, all would have been lost."

During the Indian Mutiny, the regiment was in Chanderi and at Gwalior. There, on 20 June 1858, two of its officers, Lieutenants Rose and W. F. F. Waller, organized a surprise attack by night on the Gwalior Fort, their party succeeding in breaking open a number of gates and, after hand-to-hand fighting, taking the fort. Rose was killed, but for his part in the action Waller was awarded the Victoria Cross.

In a despatch dated 5 September 1858, the regiment's commanding officer Lt Col. G. H. Robertson reported from a camp near Beejapoor that he had led a column of the 25th with men of other units out of Powree on 27 August in pursuit of Maun Singh, on the 29th engaged a party of Singh's infantry, and early on 5 September arrived near Beejapoor where he caught up with Singh, attacked him at 5.15 and had routed him by 7 a.m., destroying "at least 450 mutineers". Robertson reported only four of his men killed, and twenty men and fifteen horses wounded. He recommended Havildars Ram Lal (10th Bengal Light Infantry) and Dowlut Sing of the 25th "to the consideration of the Brigadier-General commanding" as they had "acted as spies and risked their lives in procuring information in a country where Maun Sing's influence is paramount". On the advice of Brigadier-General Sir Robert Napier, commanding the Gwalior Division, the Commander in Chief recommended that the two Havildars should receive the Order of Merit, 3rd class, "for their exertions in procuring intelligence of the movements of the enemy".

Captain W. Rice of the 25th Bombay Native Infantry, commanding the Goonah Column, wrote from camp at Arone to Sir Robert Napier on 23 December 1858 to report the success of his men, after a moonlight march through dense jungle, in breaking up the camp near Sypoor of rebels led by Feroz Shah, capturing "100 horses, several camels, and many arms", causing the enemy to "flee with the utmost despatch, and seek shelter among the dense foliage, on all sides around their position". Napier wrote to the Chief of the Staff on Christmas Day of this action "Although they did not lose many men killed, the capture of their horses and property must tend greatly to cripple and break up the party. I hear that two of the elephants were left in the Arone jungles, and may be recovered; there are, therefore, only two remaining with the enemy."

In 1861 the unit was constituted as a Light Infantry regiment, and in 1889 it was renamed 'The 25th Regiment (3rd Battalion Rifle Regiment) of Bombay Infantry', then in 1901 'The 25th Bombay Rifles'.

After the Mutiny, the regiment went on to serve in Hyderabad, Poona, Aurangabad, Mhow, Indore and Dhar, remaining part of the army of the Bombay Presidency until a reorganization of the Indian Army by Lord Kitchener in 1903 (the Kitchener Reforms) gave it the new name; '125th Napier's Rifles'.

=== First World War ===
During the First World War, the regiment fought in both the European and Middle Eastern theatres of the war, from France to Mesopotamia, and participated as part of the Egyptian Expeditionary Force in General Allenby's march to take Jerusalem, getting the better of German and Ottoman opponents.

At the outbreak of the war, the regiment was an unbrigaded unit of the 5th (Mhow) Division of the Indian Army. However, in 1914 it joined the Army's 3rd (Lahore) Division as part of its 9th (Sirhind) Brigade, landing at Marseille on 26 September 1914 and taking part in Winter Operations (1914–1915), the Battle of Neuve Chapelle (10–13 March 1915), the Battle of Aubers, the Battle of Festubert (15–25 May 1915), and the Battle of Loos subsidiary attack at the Moulin-du-Piètre on 25 September 1915. The 125th left the 3rd Division in 1915 to join the 7th (Meerut) Division. As part of the 7th Division's 21st (Bareilly) Brigade, the regiment sailed from Marseille to go to Mesopotamia, landing at Basra on 31 December 1915 and taking part in the attempt to relieve the besieged garrison of Kut al Amara. It proceeded under Allenby to Palestine, and arrived at Suez on 13 January 1918.

The unit suffered some problems and criticism during the First World War. A Rajput officer of the Indian Army, Amar Singh, who kept a diary in English from 1905 to 1921, paid particular attention to the regiment's wartime role. This diary was published in 2005 as Between Two Worlds: A Rajput Officer in the Indian Army, 1905–21.

=== Later ===
In a further reorganization of the Indian Army in 1921–1922, the regiment was amalgamated with the 104th Wellesley's Rifles, 120th Rajputana Infantry, 122nd Rajputana Infantry and 123rd Outram's Rifles to become one of the six battalions of the new 6th Rajputana Rifles. The 125th was renamed 'The 5th Battalion (Napier's)'.

In 1945, the regiments of the British Indian Army lost the numerals in their titles, and the Rajputanas arrived at their present name of Rajputana Rifles. In 1947, when the Empire of India gained independence from the British Empire and was partitioned into the Dominion of India and the Dominion of Pakistan, the regiment was allocated to India and is now the most senior rifle regiment of the Indian Army.

=== Names ===
- 1820–1826: 1st Extra Battalion of Bombay Native Infantry
- 1826–1889: 25th Regiment of Bombay Native (Light) Infantry, or 25th Bombay Native Infantry
- 1889–1901: 25th Regiment (3rd Battalion Rifle Regiment) of Bombay Infantry
- 1901–1903: 25th Bombay Rifles
- 1903–1922: 125th Napier's Rifles

Successor unit

- 1922–1945: 5th (Napier's) Battalion, 6th Rajputana Rifles
- 1945–: 5th Battalion (Napier's), The Rajputana Rifles

== Notable soldiers ==
- Colonel William Francis Frederick Waller VC (1840–1885)
- Major-General Thomas Wynford Rees CB CIE DSO MC DL (1899–1959)
- General Sir Robert Phayre GCB (1820–1897)
- Lieutenant General A.M. Sethna, PVSM, Padma Vibhushan
- Lt Gen Iqbal Singh Singha, AVSM, VSM

== Battle honours ==
- First Anglo-Afghan War
- Battle of Meeanee, Sindh, 1843
- Gwalior, 1858
- Abyssinia, 1868
- Burma, 1885 to 1887
- France, 1914 and 1915
- Mesopotamian campaign, 1915 and 1916
- Palestine, 1917, including Jerusalem

== Bibliography ==
- Cardew, F. G., Sketch of the Services of the Bengal Native Army: To the Year 1895 (Calcutta: Office of the Superintendent of Government Printing, 1903, reprinted by Naval and Military Press Ltd., 2005, ISBN 1-84574-186-2)
- Macmunn, Lt General Sir George, The Armies of India, with 72 plates in colour by Major A. C. Lovett (London: A. & C. Black, 1911, reprinted by Crecy Books, 1984, ISBN 0-947554-02-5)
- Barat, Dr Amiya, The Bengal Native Infantry: Its Organization & Discipline, 1796-1852 (Calcutta: Firma K. L. Mukhopadhyay, 1962)
- Mollo, Boris, The Indian Army (Blandford Publ., 1981, ISBN 978-0-7137-1074-8)
- Napier, Priscilla, I Have Sind: Charles Napier in India, 1841-1844 (Michael Russell Publishing, 1990, ISBN 978-0-85955-163-2)
- Ellinwood, DeWitt C. Jr., Between Two Worlds: A Rajput Officer in the Indian Army, 1905–21; Based on the Diary of Amar Singh of Jaipur (University Press of America, 2005, ISBN 0-7618-3113-4)
- Rawlinson H.G., Napier's Rifles, The history of the 5th Battalion 6th Rajputana Rifles ( Humphrey Milford London University Press 1929 )
