= Padmapani Acharya =

Recipient of Maha Vir Chakra

Major Padmapani Acharya MVC
- Born: 21 June 1969; Odisha, India
- Died: 28 June 1999 (aged 30); 3rd pimple complex, Kargil, Jammu and Kashmir, India
- Military career
- Allegiance: Republic of India
- Branch: Indian Army
- Service years: 1994-1999
- Rank: Major
- Service number: IC55072K
- Unit: 2 Rajputana Rifles
- Conflicts: Kargil War (DOW)
- Awards: Maha Vir Chakra

Major Padmapani Acharya, MVC (21 June 1969 – 28 June 1999) was an officer in the Indian Army. He was awarded the second highest Indian military honour, Maha Vir Chakra posthumously for his actions during the Kargil War on 28 June 1999.

== Personal life ==
Acharya was originally from Odisha and was a resident of Hyderabad, Telangana. Acharya was married to Charulatha. Acharya's father, Jagannath Acharya, was a retired Wing Commander of the Indian Air Force, during 1965 and 1971 wars with Pakistan. He then worked with the Defence Research and Development Laboratory (DRDL) in Hyderabad. Maj. Acharya was survived by his parents, wife and his daughter, Aparajita, who was born a few months after his death. Aparajita Acharya has been an NCC cadet.

== Military career ==
Acharya graduated from the Officers Training Academy, Madras in 1993 he was commissioned as a Second Lieutenant into the 2nd battalion, The Rajputana Rifles (2 Raj Rif).

== Kargil War ==
At the outbreak of the Kargil War, Acharya was in command of a Company of 2 Raj Rif. Acharya wrote to his father:

Dear Papa… don't worry about casualties - it's a professional hazard beyond our control. At least it is for a good cause. Tell mamma that combat is an honour of a lifetime and I could not think of anything less. What better way to serve the nation? Tell a story a day from the Mahabharata to Charu so that your grandchild imbibes good values.

== Maha Vir Chakra ==
The citation for the Maha Vir Chakra reads as follows:

Gazette Notification: 17 Pres/2000,15.8.99

Operation: Op Vijay - Kargil Date of Award: 15 Aug 1999

CITATION

MAJOR PADMAPANI ACHARYA (IC-55072)
2 RAJPUTANA RIFLES

(POSTHUMOUS)

On 28 June 1999, Major Padmapani Acharya as a Company Commander, was assigned the formidable task of capturing an enemy position which was heavily fortified, strongly held and covered with mines and sweeping machine gun and artillery fire. Success of the battalion and brigade operation hinged on the early capture of this position. However the company attack almost faltered at the very beginning when the enemy's artillery fire came down squarely on the leading platoon, inflicting large numbers of casualties. With utter disregard to his personal safely, Major Acharya took the reserve platoon of his company and led it through raining artillery shells. Even as his men were falling to the murderous enemy fire, he continued to encourage his men and charged at the enemy up the steep rock face with his reserve platoon.

Unmindful of the hail of bullets from the enemy's position, Major Acharya crawled up to the enemy position and lobbed grenades. In this daring assault, he was seriously injured. Despite heavy injuries and unable to move, he ordered his men to leave him and charge at the enemy while he continued to fire at the enemy. The enemy position was finally over-run and the objective was captured. He, however, succumbed to his injuries after completion of the mission.

== In popular culture ==
The events of Battle of Tololing was adapted as one of the prominent battle scenes in the Hindi war film LOC Kargil in which actor Nagarjuna Akkineni portrayed the role of Acharya.

== See also ==
- Digendra Kumar
- Neikezhakuo Kenguruse
- Magod Basappa Ravindranath
