= 6th Rajputana Rifles =

Infantry regiment of the British Indian Army

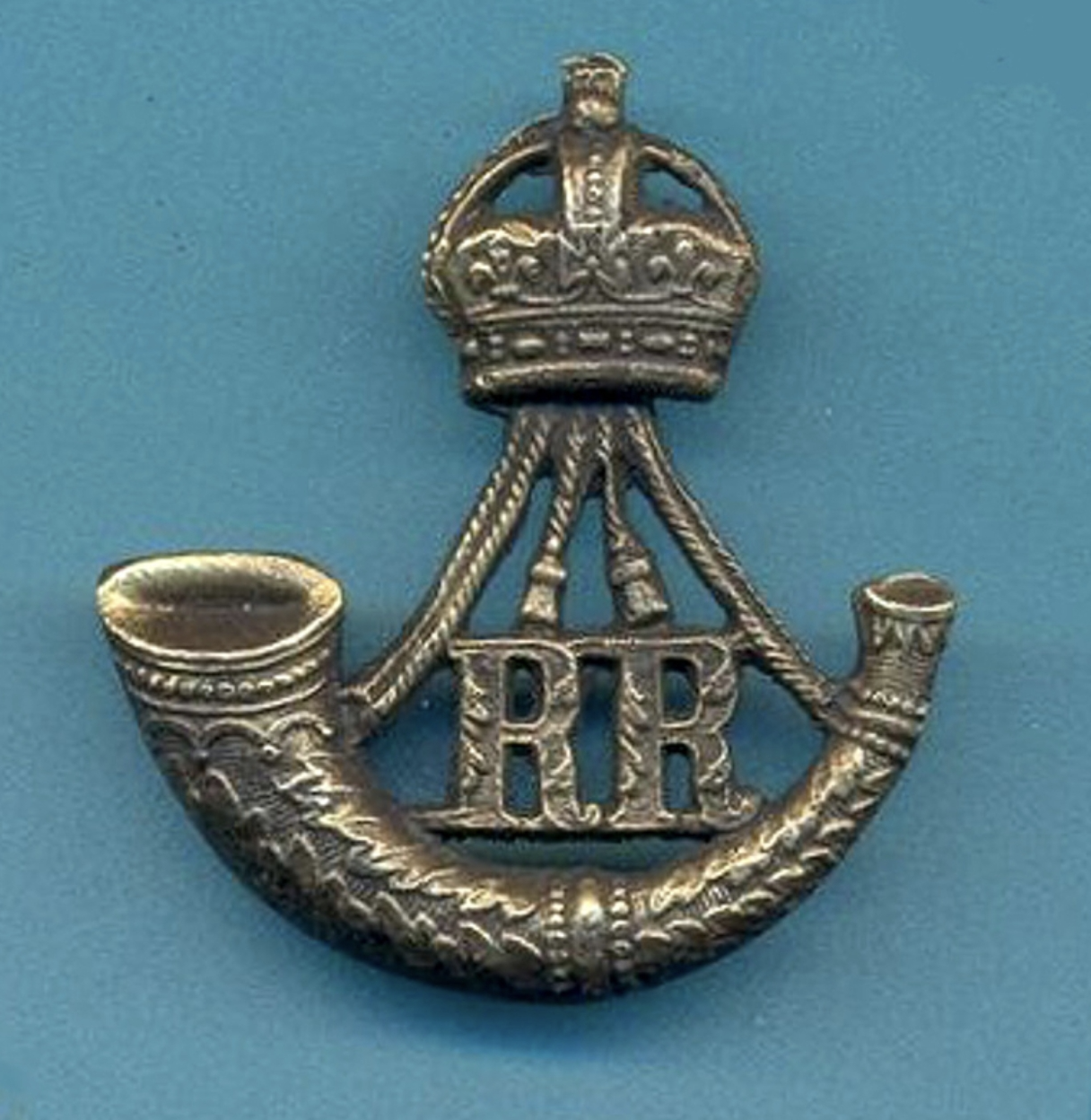
- Cap badge of the 6th Rajputana Rifles
- Active: 1921–1947
- Country: Indian Empire
- Branch: Army
- Type: Infantry
- Size: Regiment
- Part of: British Indian Army
- Garrison/HQ: Nasirabad
- Colors: Rifle green faced scarlet red
- Successor: Rajputana Rifles
- Engagements: World War II

Commanders
- Colonel of the Regiment: October 1939; 1st Battalion: Colonel (Temporary Brigadier) Charles M. S. Summers, DSO MC; 2nd Battalion: Colonel (Honorary Brigadier) Philip F. Pocock, CB DSO (Retd.); 4th Battalion: Honorary Brigadier General Gilbert R. Cassels, CB DSO (Retd.); 5th Battalion: Colonel Francis H. Maynard, CB DSO MC (Retd.)
- Notable commanders: Major General Thomas Wynford Rees

The 6th Rajputana Rifles was an infantry regiment of the British Indian Army. Formed in 1921, it initially consisted of five active battalions and one training battalion.

== History ==
=== Formation and class composition ===
In 1921, the British Indian Army decided to tackle the issue regarding the breakdown of the old system where the single battalion regiments, each having a different class composition, were responsible for recruiting and training their own recruits during World War I. To resolve the issue, most single battalion regiments were initially grouped into "Regimental Groupings" of 3 to 5 battalions each plus one more (10th Battalion) that served as a training unit for the group. Subsequently, these "Regimental Groupings" would become regiments where all battalions are identical in class composition, easing the problems of recruitment and training new soldiers that had been a problem previously in single battalion regiments and their different class compositions resulting in complications in supplying reinforcements during the war.

For the 6th Rajputana Rifles, the class composition was fixed to consist of

- 1 company of Rajputana Rajputs
- 2 companies of Western Rajputana Jats
- 1 company of Punjabi Mussalmans

The training centre was based in Nasirabad and contained a headquarter company and one training company for each of the five active battalions, with four platoons in each training company whose classes corresponded to the class composition of the battalions. Further reorganisation of the infantry battalions resulted in each battalion having one headquarter company, three rifle companies, and one machine gun company, necessitating the redistribution of classes, which in the wake of the Battalion Commanders' Conference at Nasirabad, was agreed that each rifle company would have

- 1 platoon of Rajputana Rajputs
- 2 platoons of Western Rajputana Jats
- 1 platoon of Punjabi Mussalmans

=== Interwar period and World War II ===
After the formation, the battalions of the 6th Rajputana Rifles were kept busy in both operational and ceremonial duties in the interwar period. The 1st Battalion (Wellesley's), for instance, was sent to Damdil in present-day Waziristan to reinforce the garrison after a theft of arms was reported there in March 1927. In the following year, when the 1st Battalion (Wellesley's) was stationed at Mhow, it provided a detachment of 184 strong, consisting of Jats from "B" and "C" companies under the command of Captain R.D. Ambrose MC, to act as the Viceroy's Guard at Simla where the Viceroy, Lord Irwin, presented a handsome silver cigarette box to the Officer's Mess as a token of appreciation and General Sir William Birdwood, Commander-in-Chief, India, likewise presented a signed photograph in a silver frame.

It was also in 1927 that a pipe band was formed in the 1st Battalion (Wellesley's) in place of the brass band due to the prohibitive costs borne by the British Officers and the lack of appeal by the Indian soldiers, who preferred the pipes for resembling their native music. The 5th Battalion (Napier's) and subsequently the Seaforth Highlanders trained up the pipe band. The uniform for the pipers was adopted from the 5th Battalion (Napier's) with their permission, consisting of green knickerbockers, puggris, and puttees, a white coat with a plaid of the Urquhart Tartan being held on the shoulder by a silver brooch bearing the Battalion's crest and battle honours.

In March 1930, the 1st Battalion (Wellesley's) was sent to Ahmedabad to quell the unrest roused by the Congress Party led by Gandhi in opposition to payment of Government Salt Tax. Arriving there on 12 March, the situation proved relatively uneventful. In 1931, the Subadar Major of the Battalion, Rahimdad Khan, Sardar Bahadur, MBE IDSM, was sent to England to serve as an Orderly Officer to King George V. He was a survivor of the Siege of Kut and had a distinguished record at both Mesopotamia and Waziristan. The 1st Battalion (Wellesley's) changed stations every few years from Ahmedabad to Kyber in 1932, to Aurangabad in 1934, to Saidpur in 1936, and to Chittagong in 1937. It was also in 1937 that Subadar Ganesha Ram, Bahadur, OBI IDSM, a survivor from the Siege of Kut, represented the Battalion at the Coronation of King George VI and Queen Elizabeth and received the Coronation Medal.

During World War II, the regiment was expanded to thirteen battalions and served in the Middle East, Burma, and Malaya. The 4th Battalion (Outram's) had the distinction of earning two Victoria Crosses during that conflict by Subedar Richhpal Ram and Company Havildar-Major Chhelu Ram. In 1945, the numeral "6th" was discarded and eventually the regiment would be allocated to the new Indian Army after independence in 1947 as the Rajputana Rifles.

== List of battalions in 1921 ==
- 1st Battalion (Wellesley's) (formerly 104th Wellesley's Rifles)
- 2nd Battalion (Prince of Wales' Own) (formerly 120th Rajputana Infantry)
- 3rd Battalion (formerly 122nd Rajputana Infantry)
- 4th Battalion (Outram's) (formerly 123rd Outram's Rifles)
- 5th Battalion (Napier's) (formerly 125th Napier's Rifles)
- 10th (Training) Battalion (Shekhawati) (formerly 13th Rajputs (The Shekhawati Regiment))

== Uniforms ==
The 6th Rajputana Rifles adopted rifle green tunics with scarlet red facings that was similar to the King's Royal Rifle Corps. The practice dates back to the necessity for specially trained light troops in the wake of the American Revolutionary War. The Americans were quick to realise that irregular and open formations were the best tactics for fighting over a wild and sparsely populated country, much of which was wooded. A large proportion of Americans were marksmen armed with rifles which enabled them to pick off the British officers and sergeants. To counter the American tactics, light companies, many of them armed with rifles, were specially trained in all battalions on service there. Subsequently, whole battalions were raised with all ranks armed with rifles, and this would give rise to Rifle Regiments such as the King's Royal Rifle Corps which the 6th Rajputana Rifles was modelled after.

=== Pouch belt ===
As firepower was of the greatest importance one of the first orders issued after the return of the troops was to speed up the "Manual Exercise". To provide for the increased expenditure of ammunition entailed by this, orders were issued for men armed with the rifle to wear a belt over the left shoulder to provide a second pouch for cartridges, leading to the creation of the "Pouch Belt" worn by the officers in Review Order.

=== Style of tunic ===
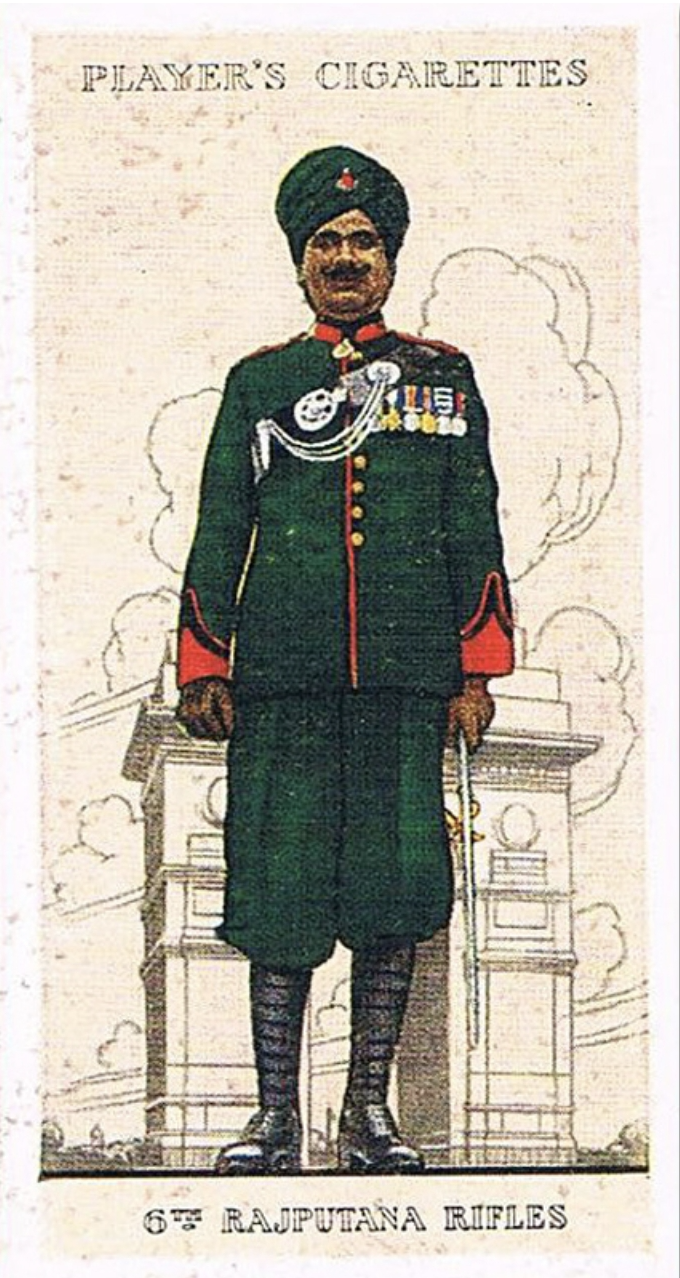
Indian Officer in Review Order, 6th Rajputana Rifles, 1938. He is wearing a rifle green tunic with scarlet red facings, and a pouch belt with the pouch belt badge and the silver whistle and chain device affixed on the belt.

The Rifleman, like the Light Infantryman, was trained to skirmish and also to carry out those rapid movements which, in the Cavalry, would have been the role of the Hussars. For this reason, Officers of the Rifle Corps were, in the early days, dressed in a uniform modelled on that of the Hussars, retaining the "Cap Lines," the globular buttons, the Straight Spurs in Mess Dress and the Charger's "Throat Plume." For the same reason Rifle Regiments march past in faster time than the Infantry of the Line. In the 6th Rajputana Rifles, the Hussars style of tunic is worn only by the British Officers, whereas the Indian Officers wore a plain tunic.

=== The adoption of Rifle Green ===
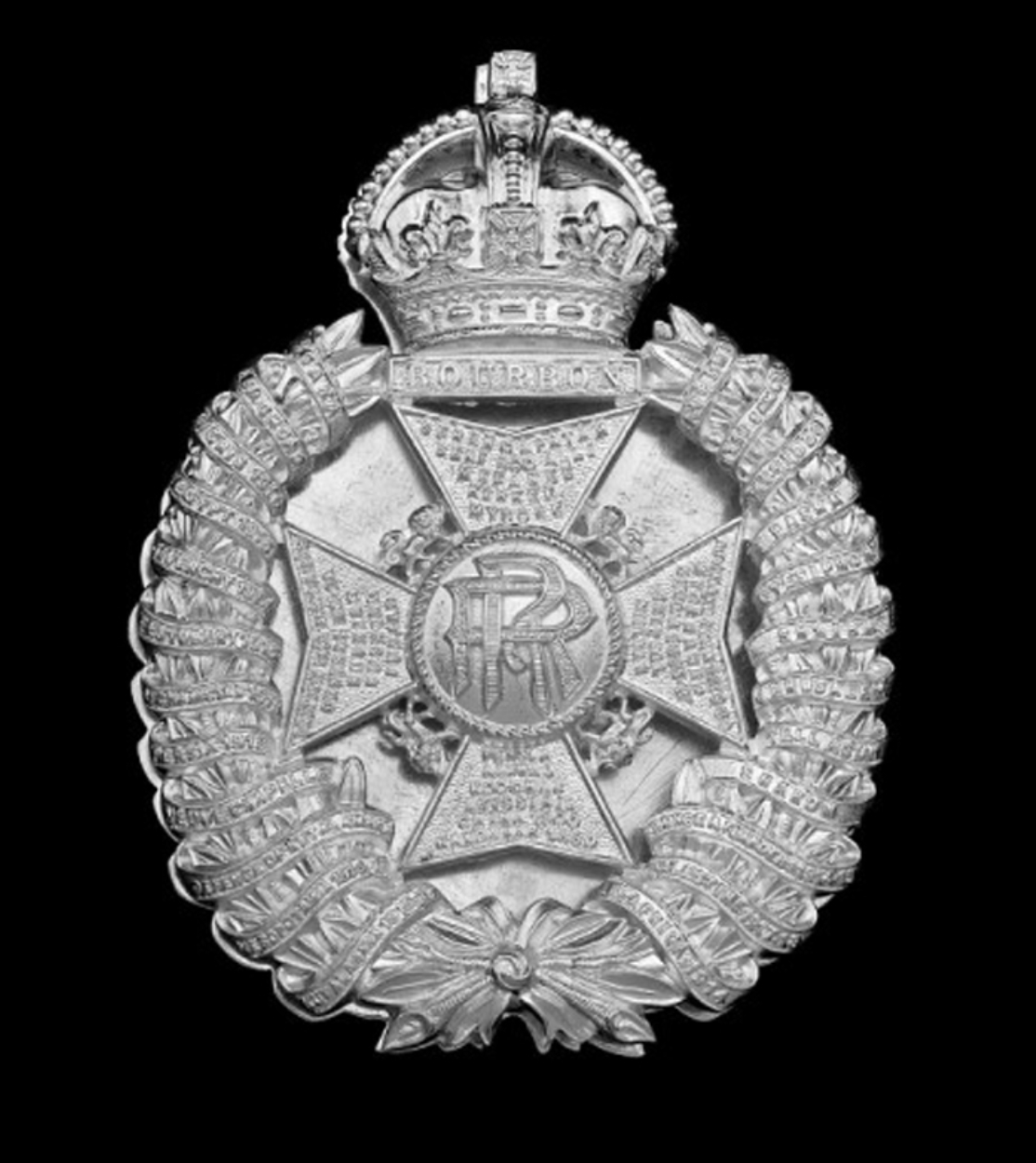
Pouch Belt Badge of the 6th Rajputana Rifles, showing the Maltese Cross device in the middle.

To render the men inconspicuous when taking advantage of cover, the red coat was discarded in favour of a green one, green being the recognised uniform of the foresters throughout Europe in those days. The green coat remained the Field Service Dress until about the middle of the nineteenth century. It was in green that the Riflemen fought at the Siege of Multan (1848–1849). Later when green was superseded by khaki for field service, and the shako by the puggri, green gaiters, or puttees, and green puggris were worn as a distinguishing mark, but now are worn only in Review Order. The distinctive green colour has been perpetuated lately, however, by the adoption of green hosetops in Drill and Field Service Order.

=== Bugle and Maltese Cross devices ===
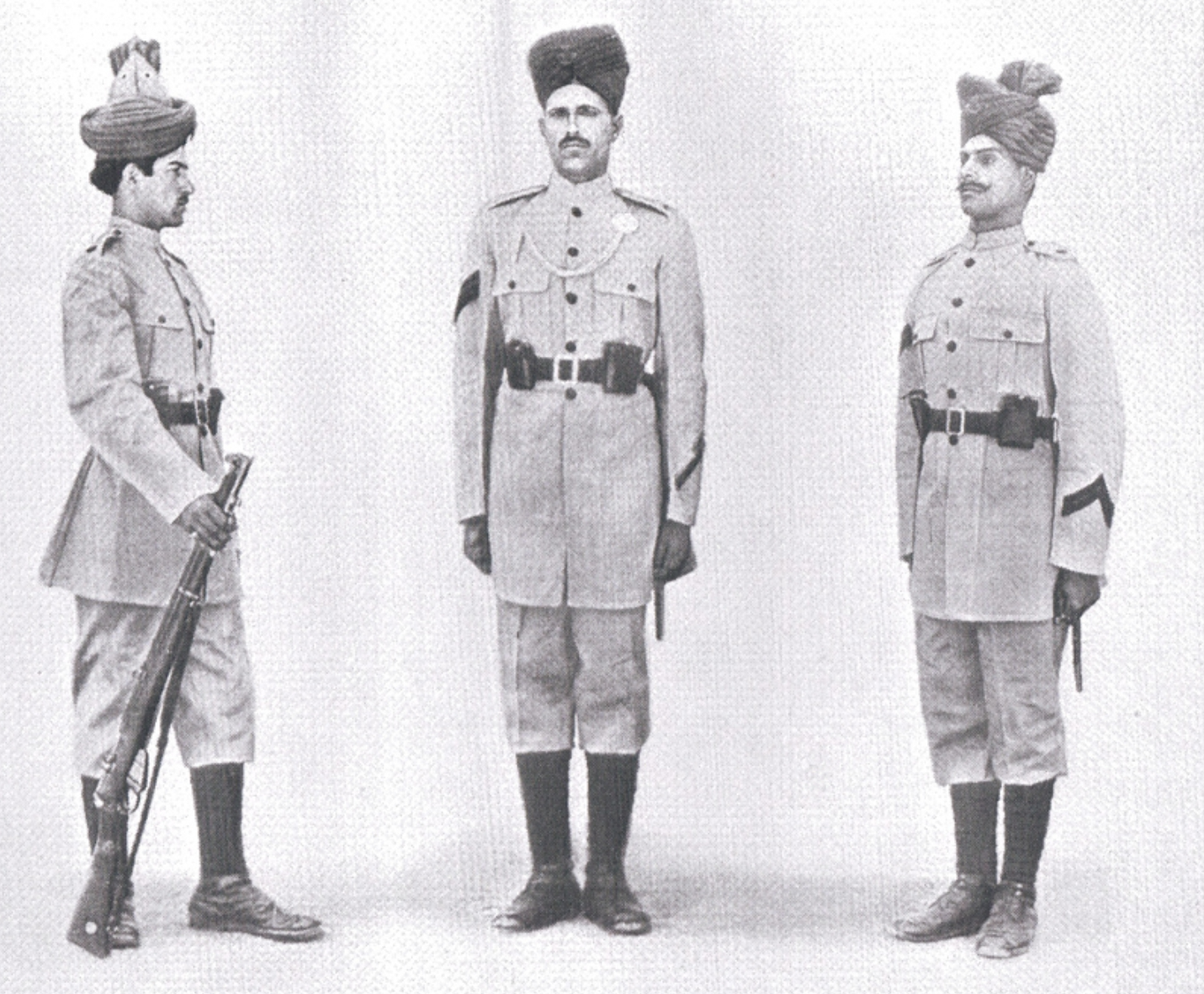
Indian Other Ranks in Review Order, 1st Bn 6th Rajputana Rifles, 1936. The centre man is a Havildar as distinguished by the silver and whistle chain device on his tunic. Note the cap badge affixed on the puggris, the shape of the bugle device is very evident.

As orders could not be given verbally to men in extended order, the forester's bugle horn was adopted to control movements. Hence the bugle device formed part of the cap badge which the regiment wear as a puggri badge and on the pouch of the pouch belt. The reason for the introduction of the Maltese Cross device as part of the pouch belt badge is obscure; it is probably of Hanoverian origin and has been seen on British Rifle Regiments such as the King's Royal Rifle Corps and the Rifle Brigade.

=== Silver Whistle and Chain device worn by Havildars ===
To enable the Havildars (Sergeants) to control their divisions, they wore a whistle and chain, which at one time was the only mark to distinguish them from the rank and file. This is commemorated by the silver whistle and chain worn in Review Order by the Havildars.

== Regimental traditions ==
The following regimental traditions existed in the 6th Rajputana Rifles and were similar to other rifle regiments in the British Army.

=== Usage of term "Sword" for bayonets ===
In the early days the Rifleman, besides his rifle, carried a sword which, like a bayonet, could be fixed to the rifle. This is why the Rifleman now speaks of his bayonet as a sword.

=== Leftmost position on parades ===
In the days of close order fighting, the flanks, being the danger points, were guarded by picked troops and were regarded as the posts of honour. In the Battalion, the Grenadier and Light Companies, composed of picked men, fell in on the flanks of the Battalion and were known as the "Flank Companies." It is for this reason that Rifle Regiments on Review Parades are accorded the honour of falling in on the extreme left of the line.

=== Rifles as the Regimental Colours ===
When fighting in extended order the Regimental Colours became exposed and were therefore discarded, the Rifleman being taught that his rifle took the place of Colours to be guarded with his life. This is why the recruits, when taking the oath on attestation, lay their hands on, and salute piled rifles.

=== Omission of the command "Attention" ===
Throughout his training the Rifleman was taught to live up to the Rifle motto "Celer et Audax" (Latin: Swift and Bold) and always to be on alert. For this reason, the order "Attention" was deemed superfluous. The Rifleman is to be always ready.

== Gallery of the soldiers from the 1st Bn 6th Rajputana Rifles in 1936 ==
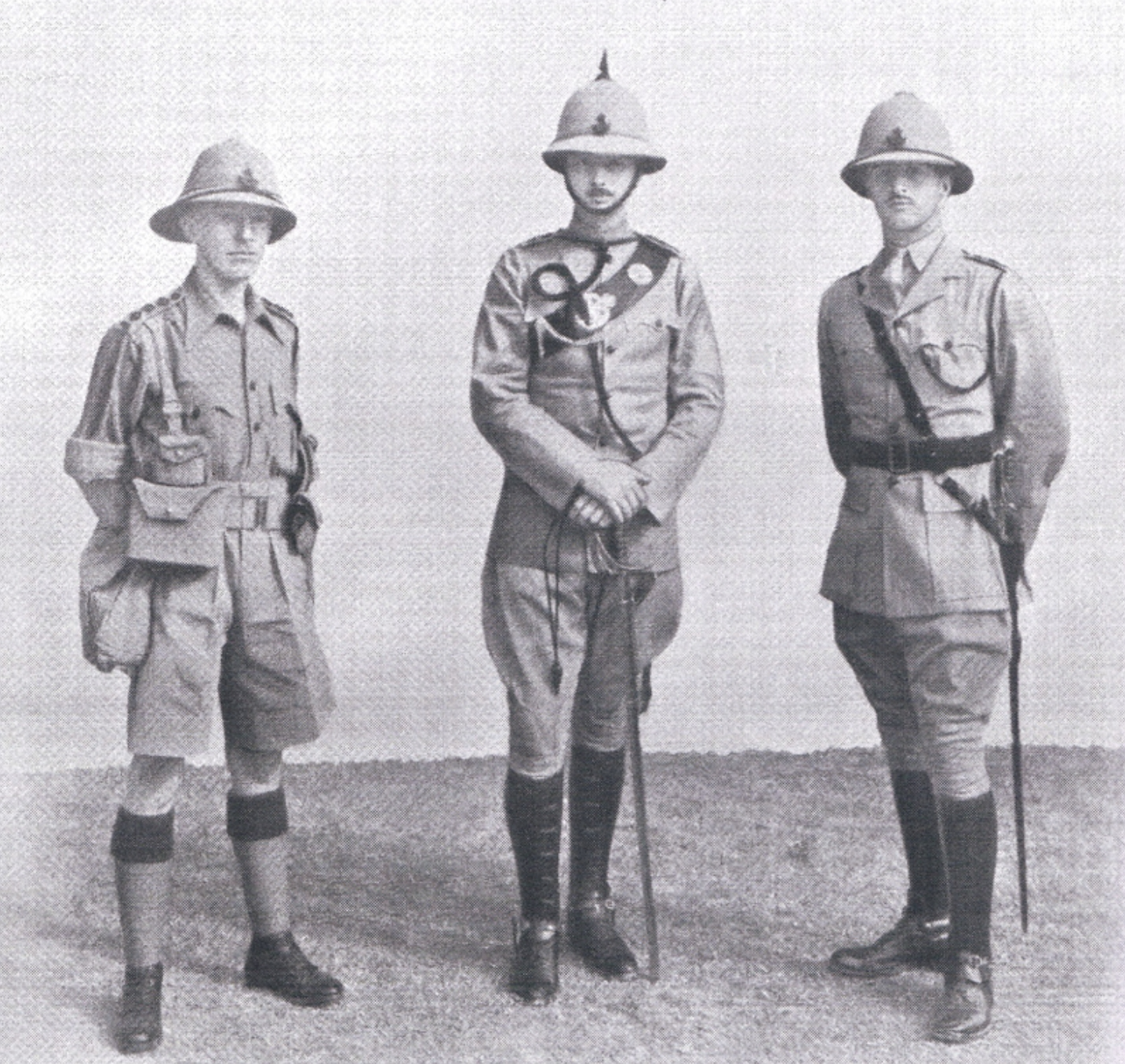
British Officers. L to R: Captain Frederick Gordon Cuerden, Lieutenant Ralph Preston Inwood, Lieutenant Christopher Martin Brack. Captain Cuerden is in Field Service Order, Lieutenant Inwood is in Review Order, and Lieutenant Brack is in Drill Order.

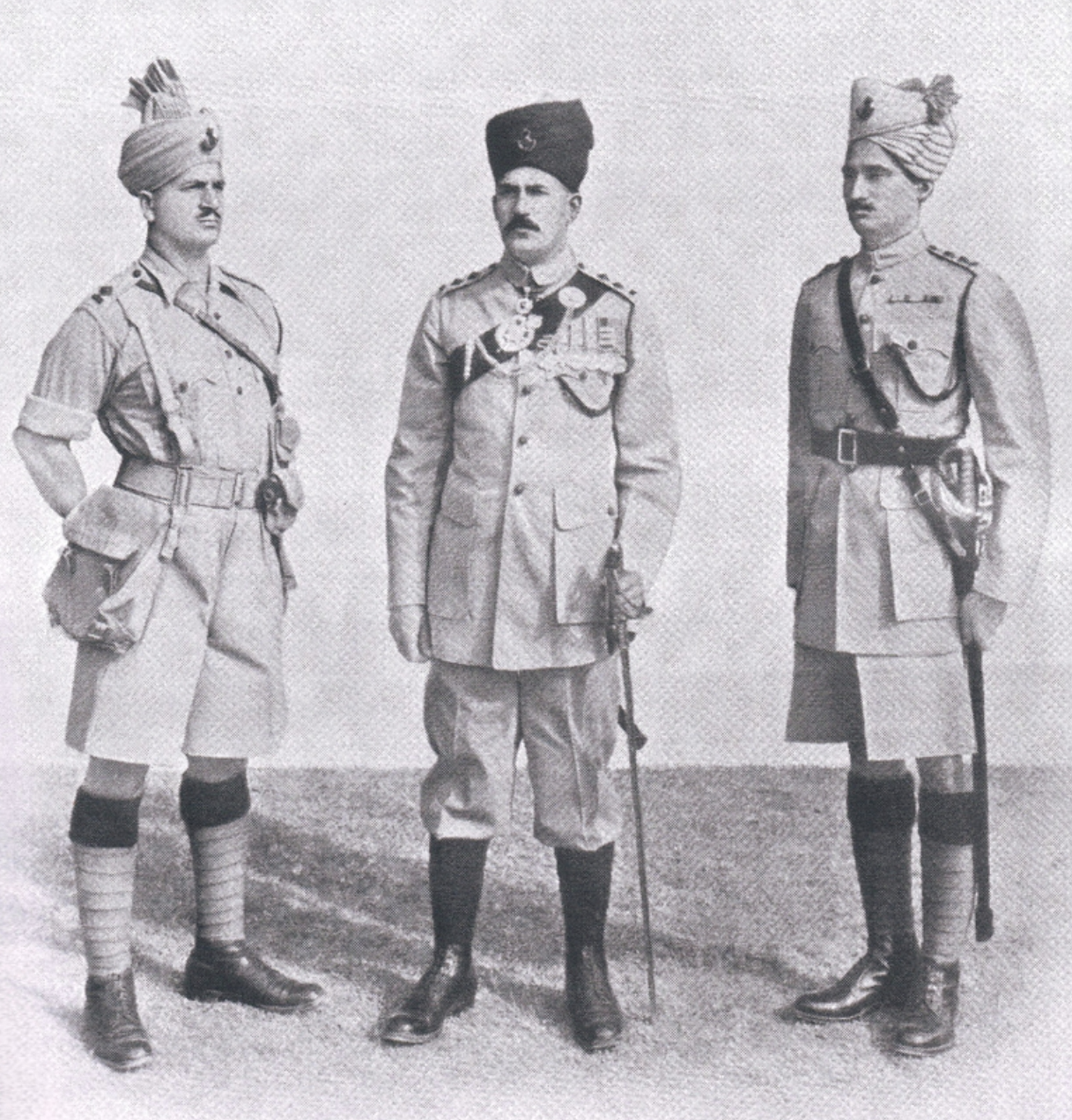
Indian Officers. L to R: Jemadar Feroz Khan, Subadar Ganesha Ram Bahadur OBI IDSM, Subadar Mul Singh. Jemadar Khan is in Field Service Order, Subadar Ram is in Review Order, and Subadar Singh is in Drill Order.

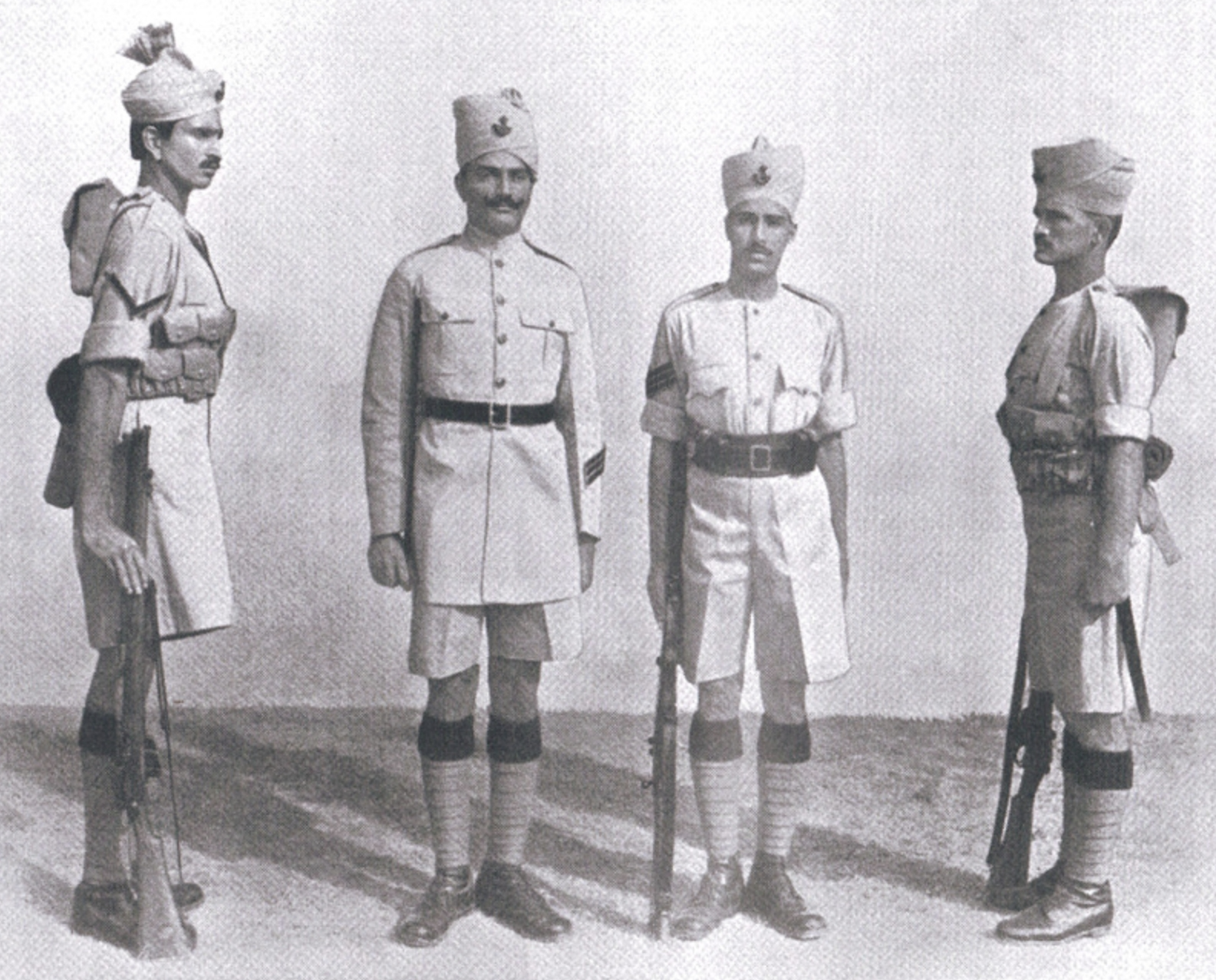
Indian Other Ranks. L to R: Junior Punjabi Mussalman Lance naik, Rajput, Senior Jat Havildar, Jat. The Punjabi Mussalman Lance naik and Jat is in Field Service Order, lower Junior the Rajput is in Drill Order, and Senior the Jat Havildar is in short-sleeve Drill Order.

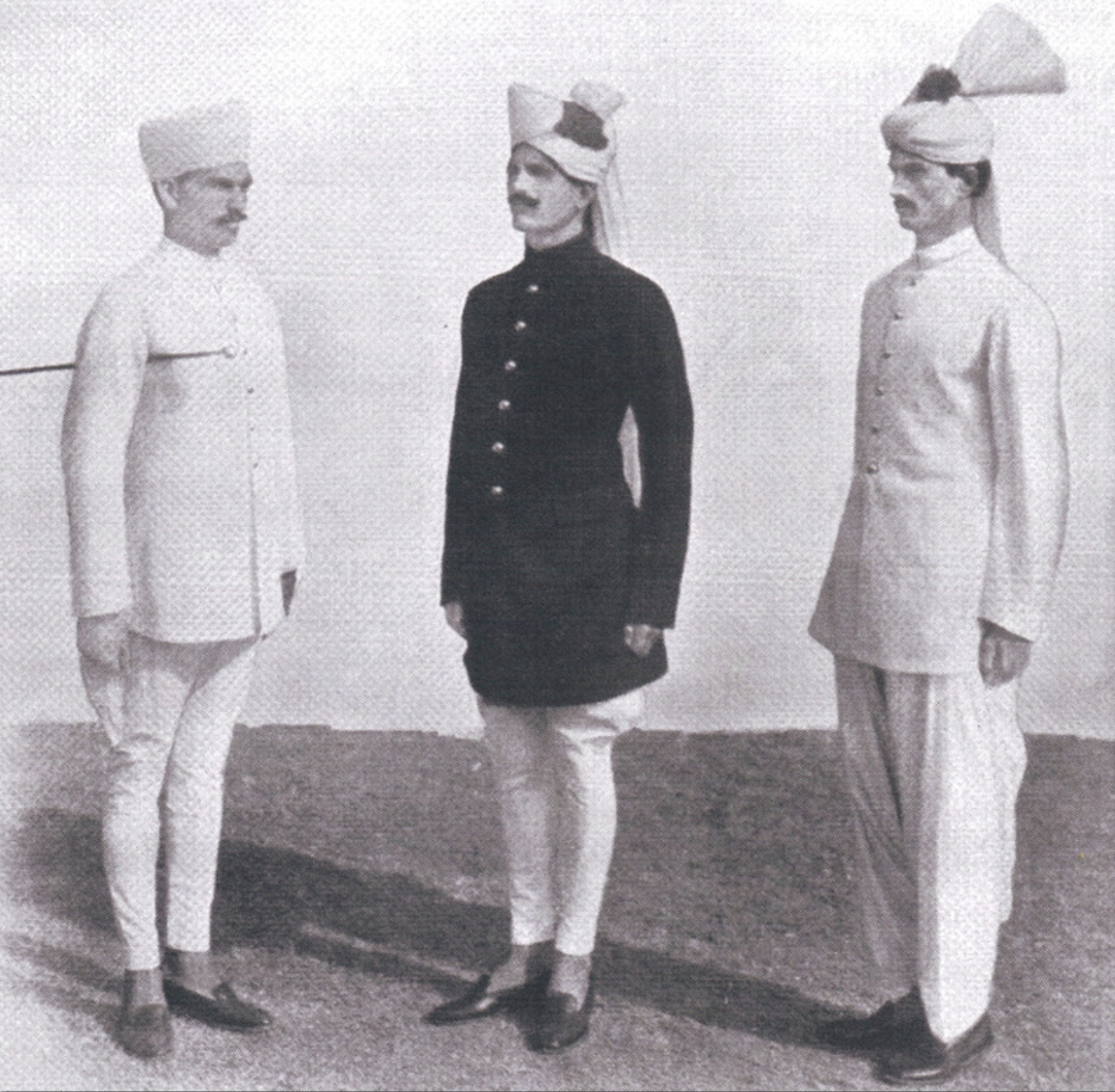
Indian Other Ranks in Mufti (a type of walking out civilian dress). L to R: Rajput, Jat, Punjabi Mussalman. The Rajput and Punjabi Mussalman are in Summer Mufti, Senior the Jat in Winter Mufti.

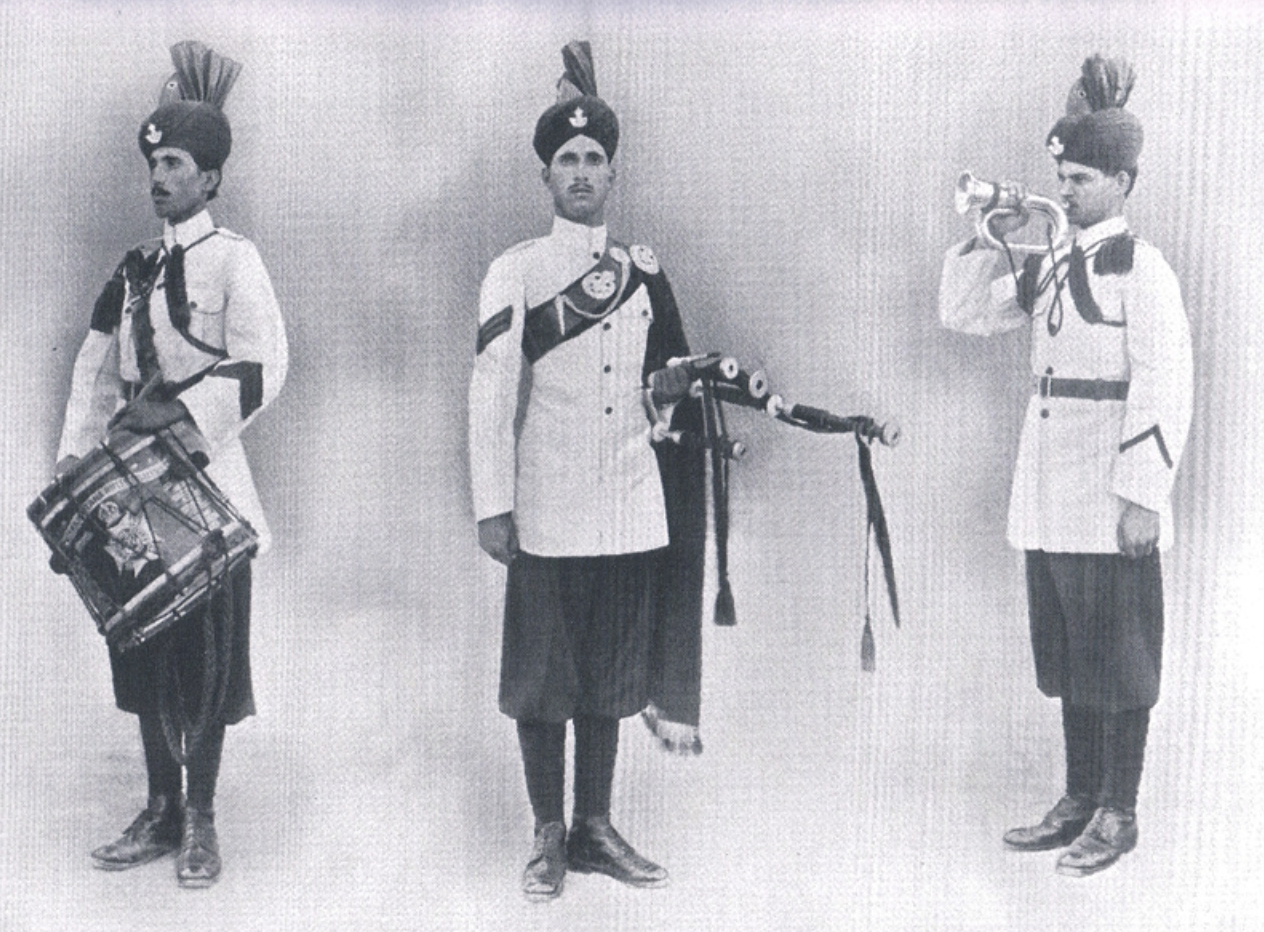
Drummer, Piper, and Bugler. L to R: Drummer Ali Gaur, Pipe Major Sarwar Khan, Bugler Sardar Ali.

== Sources ==
- James, F. H. (1938). History of the 1st Battalion 6th Rajputana Rifles (Wellesley's). Aldershot, England: Gale & Polden.
- Luscombe, Stephen. "104th Wellesley's Rifles' Badges". The British Empire.
- Luscombe, Stephen. "104th Wellesley's Rifles' Pipers and Buglers". The British Empire.
- Luscombe, Stephen. "104th Wellesley's Rifles' Uniforms". The British Empire.
- Sharma, Gautam (1990). Valour and sacrifice: famous regiments of the Indian Army. Allied Publishers. ISBN 81-7023-140-X.
- Sumner, Ian (2001). The Indian Army 1914-47. Great Britain: Osprey Publishing.
- The Indian Army List October 1939. Defence Department, Government of India. 1939.
