= 10th Regiment of Bombay Native Infantry =

The 10th Regiment of Bombay Native Infantry refers to:110 MARATHAS that became 3/5 Maratha LI which subsequently became 2PARA(MARATHA) and is now 2PARA(SF). Prior to being named 10Bombay Native Infantry in 1818 it was 2nd Battalion of 5th Bombay Native Infantry Regiment.It was raised in 1797.

- 1st Battalion which became the 119th Infantry (The Mooltan Regiment)
- 2nd Battalion which became the 120th Rajputana Infantry
