= John Augustus Wood =

Scottish recipient of the Victoria Cross (1818–1878)

- Born: 10 June 1818; Fort William, Scotland
- Died: 23 January 1878 (aged 59); Poona, British India
- Burial place: St Mary's Churchyard, Poona
- Military career
- Allegiance: United Kingdom
- Branch: Bombay Army
- Rank: Colonel
- Units: 20th Bombay Native Infantry
- Conflicts: Anglo-Persian War; Indian Mutiny
- Awards: Victoria Cross

Colonel John Augustus Wood VC (10 June 1818 – 23 January 1878) was a Scottish recipient of the Victoria Cross, the highest and most prestigious award for gallantry in the face of the enemy that can be awarded to British and Commonwealth forces.

== Details ==
Wood was 38 years old, and a captain in the 20th Bombay Native Infantry, Bombay Army during the Persian War when the following deed took place for which he was awarded the VC.

On 9 December 1856 at Bushire, Persia, Captain Wood led a Grenadier Company which formed the head of the assaulting column and was the first man on the parapet of the fort, where he was immediately attacked by a large number of the garrison. A volley was fired at Captain Wood and the head of the storming party at very close range but although the captain was hit by seven musket balls he at once threw himself upon the enemy, killing their leader. He was closely followed by the men of his company and speedily overcame all opposition.

His was the first Victoria Cross to be won in a British Indian regiment and the standard captured that day is still preserved by the battalion.

== Further information ==
He later achieved the rank of colonel. His VC is held by the 2 Rajputana Rifles regiment of the Indian Army. He died on 23 January 1878 aged 59.

== See also ==
- List of Scottish Victoria Cross recipients
