= Rajesh Kumar (soldier) =

Ashoka Chakra recipient (d. 2009)

Havildar Rajesh Kumar AC
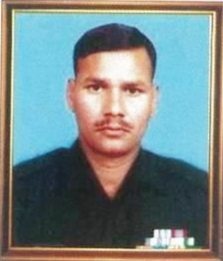
- Portrait of Hav Rajesh Kumar
- Born: Lath, Sonipat District, Haryana, India
- Died: 1 August 2009; Kupwara, Jammu and Kashmir, India
- Spouse: Beeta
- Military career
- Allegiance: India
- Branch: Indian Army
- Rank: Havildar
- Service number: 2890262H
- Unit: 11 Rajputana Rifles
- Awards: Ashok Chakra

Havildar Rajesh Kumar, AC was a Non Commissioned Officer (NCO) of Indian Army who was awarded India's highest military decoration Ashoka Chakra.

== Early life ==
Rajesh Kumar was born in the village of Lath near Bhainswal Kalan, Sonipat District in Haryana. He was the son of Ram Kishan and Parmeshwari. He joined the army after his initial education.

== Military career ==
Kumar was recruited into 11th battalion Rajputana Rifles, an infantry regiment with a history of gallantry awards and battle honours.

On 1 August 2009, he was leading a section of the Ghatak team on a search mission for terrorists in the forests of Kupwara district of Jammu and Kashmir. He opened fire on the terrorists and killed three of them, but was seriously wounded in the process.

He later succumbed to these injuries. He was posthumously awarded the Ashoka Chakra, the highest peacetime military decoration in India.

== Ashoka Chakra awardee ==
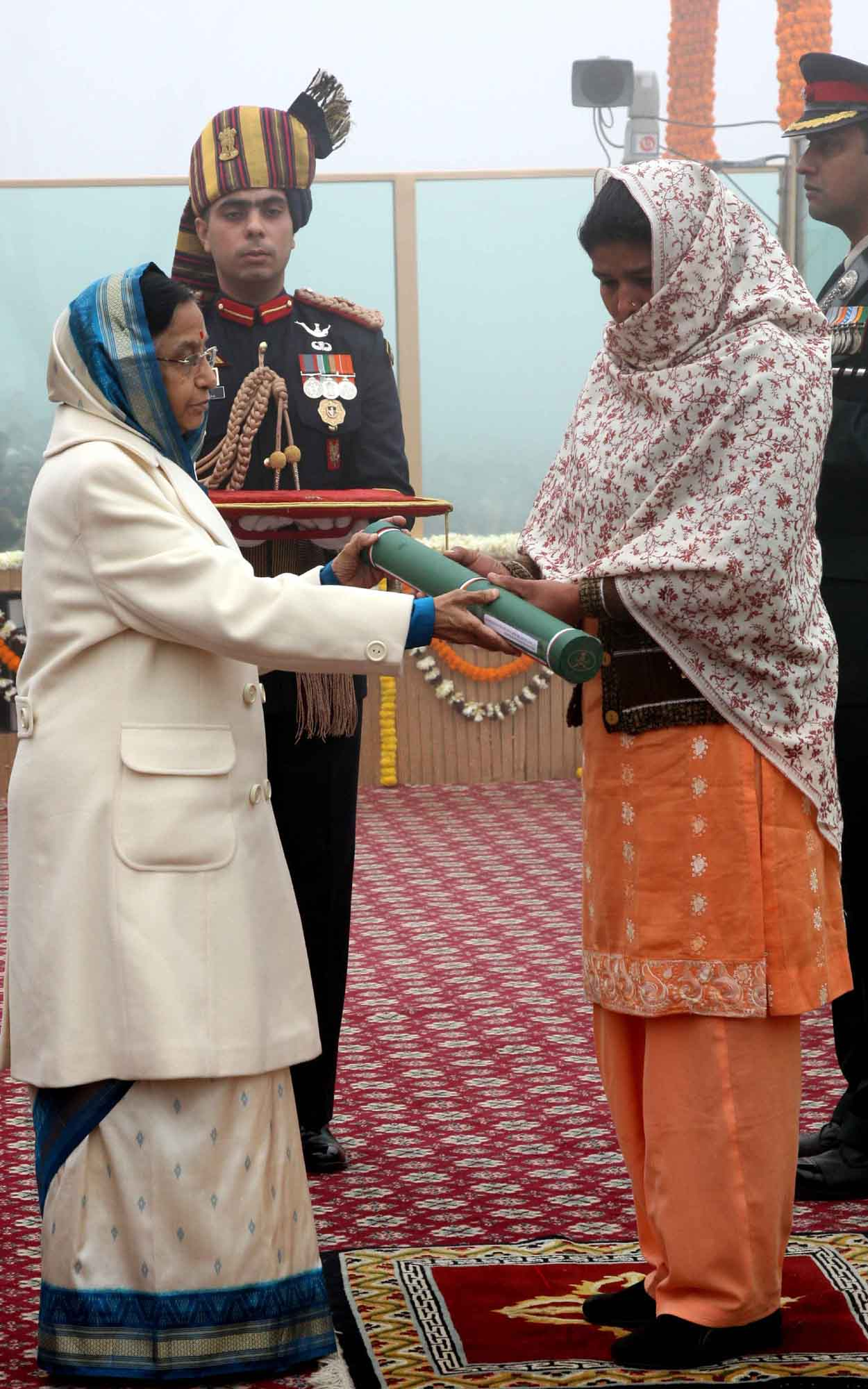
President Pratibha Patil giving away the Ashok Chakra to Smt. Beeta, widow of Rajesh Kumar in New Delhi on 26 January 2010

The citation by the President of India during the awarding of the Ashoka Chakra read: Havildar Rajesh Kumar showed unparalleled feat of most conspicuous gallantry, fortitude and the rare spirit of self sacrifice in fighting the terrorists.
