= Ummed Singh Mahra =

Captain Ummed Singh Mahra AC
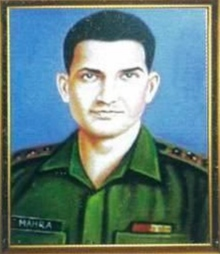
- Portrait of Captain Ummed Singh Mahra
- Born: January 21, 1942; Almora, Uttarakhand
- Died: July 6, 1971 (aged 29); Nagaland, India
- Military career
- Allegiance: India
- Branch: Indian Army
- Rank: Captain
- Service number: IC-17696
- Units: 19th Battalion, The Rajputana Rifles
- Conflicts: Operation Cactus-Lilly
- Awards: Ashoka Chakra

Captain Ummed Singh Mahra (21 January 1942–6 July 1971) was a posthumous recipient of the Ashoka Chakra.

== Early life ==
Captain Ummed was born in a Kumaoni Rajput family in Almora, born in the Almora district of Uttarakhand. In 1967 he graduated from the Indian Military Academy and was commissioned a second lieutenant in the 19 battalion of the Rajputana Rifles on 11 June. He was promoted lieutenant on 11 June 1969.

== Action ==
In July 1971, as an acting captain, he led a raiding party against the headquarters of an insurgent group in Nagaland. Though wounded in a firefight, he continued to lead the operation which captured a large cache of arms, ammunition and important documents. He scummed to his injuries after returning from the raid. He was awarded the Ashoka Chakra, India's highest peacetime military decoration.
