= Vivek Gupta (major) =

Indian army officer (1970–1999)

Major Vivek Gupta MVC
- Born: 2 January 1970; Dehradun, Uttarakhand, India
- Died: 13 June 1999 (aged 29); Kargil, Jammu and Kashmir, India
- Education: National Defence Academy; Indian Military Academy
- Spouse: Capt. (Dr.) Rajshree Bisht (m. 1997)
- Military career
- Allegiance: Republic of India
- Branch: Indian Army
- Service years: 1992–1999
- Rank: Major
- Nickname: Vicky
- Service number: IC–51152K
- Unit: 2 RAJ RIF
- Conflicts: Kargil War †
- Awards: Maha Vir Chakra

Major Vivek Gupta MVC (2 January 1970 – 13 June 1999) was an officer in the Indian Army. He was posthumously conferred the Maha Vir Chakra, India's second highest war-time military honour, for his actions during the 1999 Kargil War Operation Vijay.

He belonged to the second battalion of the Rajputana Rifles, also known as 2 Raj Rif. He was also awarded the Chief of Army Staff (COAS) commendation card during his service.

== Biography ==
Vivek Gupta was born on 2 January 1970, in Deharadun, Uttarakhand, to Lieutenant Colonel BRS Gupta.

Vivek joined the National Defense Academy and the Indian Military Academy. He was commissioned into the Rajputana Rifles Regiment, an infantry regiment famed for its brave warriors, on 13 June 1992.

In 1997, Major Vivek married army officer Capt Rajshree Bisht. He received the Chief of Army Staff (COAS) commendation card. He was assigned to Infantry School, Mhow, as a weapon instructor.

Later, in 1999, he participated in the Kargil War, when he was killed in action and received the Maha Vir Chakra.

== Kargil War: June 1999 ==
During the Kargil war in 1999, Major Vivek Gupta was instrumental in capturing the Tololing peak. The 2nd Rajputana Rifles entered the war when the Indian army lacked sufficientinformation about the scope of the invasion. Major Gupta and his men from the Rajputana Rifles' 2nd Battalion were tasked with recapturing point 4590 at Tololing in the Drass sector.

This, like so many later operations in Kargil, was a dangerous mission that required an uphill accent toward the entrenched enemy posts with the benefit of vertical position and good vantage point.

Major Vivek was killed in action on 13 June, exactly seven years after joining the Rajputana Rifles.

== Maha Vir Chakra ==
Posthumously, he was awarded the Maha Vir Chakra by then President of India, late K. R. Narayanan on 15 August 2000.

CITATION

VIVEK GUPTA
(IC–51152K)

2 RAJPUTANA RIFLES

Major Vivek Gupta was in command of the leading Charlie Company, when 2nd Rajputana Rifles launched a battalion attack on Tololing Top, in Drass sector on 13 June 1999. In spite of heavy artillery and automatic fire, the company under the leadership of Major Vivek Gupta was able to close in with the enemy. As soon as the Company emerged in the open, they came under multi-directional intense fire. Three personnel of the leading section of the Company were hit and the attack was temporarily stalled. Knowing fully well that staying any longer in the open under the murderous enemy fire would lead to more losses, Major Vivek Gupta reacted immediately and fired a rocket launcher at the enemy position. Before the shocked enemy could recover, Major Vivek Gupta charged on to the enemy position. While so charging, he was hit by two bullets, despite which, he kept moving towards the position. On reaching the position, he engaged the enemy in fierce hand-to-hand combat and managed to kill three enemy soldiers despite his own injuries.

Taking inspiration form the gallant deed of their officer, the rest of the company charged onto the enemy position and captured it. However, in the ensuing combat, Major Vivek Gupta received another direct from enemy bullets and finally succumbed to his injuries. Major Vivek Gupta displayed conspicuous gallantry and inspiring leadership in the face of the enemy, which, ultimately led to the capture of Tololing Top.

— Gazette of India Notification,

== In popular culture ==
- Major Vivek Gupta was portrayed by Bollywood actor Himanshu Malik in the 2003 historical battle film LOC: Kargil.
