= William Francis Frederick Waller =

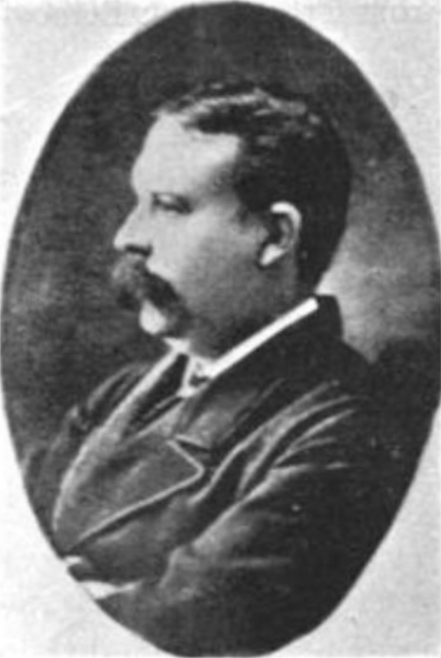
- Born: 20 August 1839; Dagoolie, British India
- Died: 29 January 1885 (aged 45); Bath, Somerset, England
- Burial place: Locksbrook Cemetery, Bath
- Military career
- Allegiance: United Kingdom
- Branch: Bengal Army; British Indian Army
- Service years: 1857-
- Rank: Colonel
- Conflicts: Indian Mutiny
- Awards: Victoria Cross

Colonel William Francis Frederick Waller, VC (20 August 1839 – 29 January 1885) was a Bengal Army and British Indian Army officer. He was a recipient of the Victoria Cross, the highest and most prestigious award for gallantry in the face of the enemy that can be awarded to British and Commonwealth forces.

== Details ==
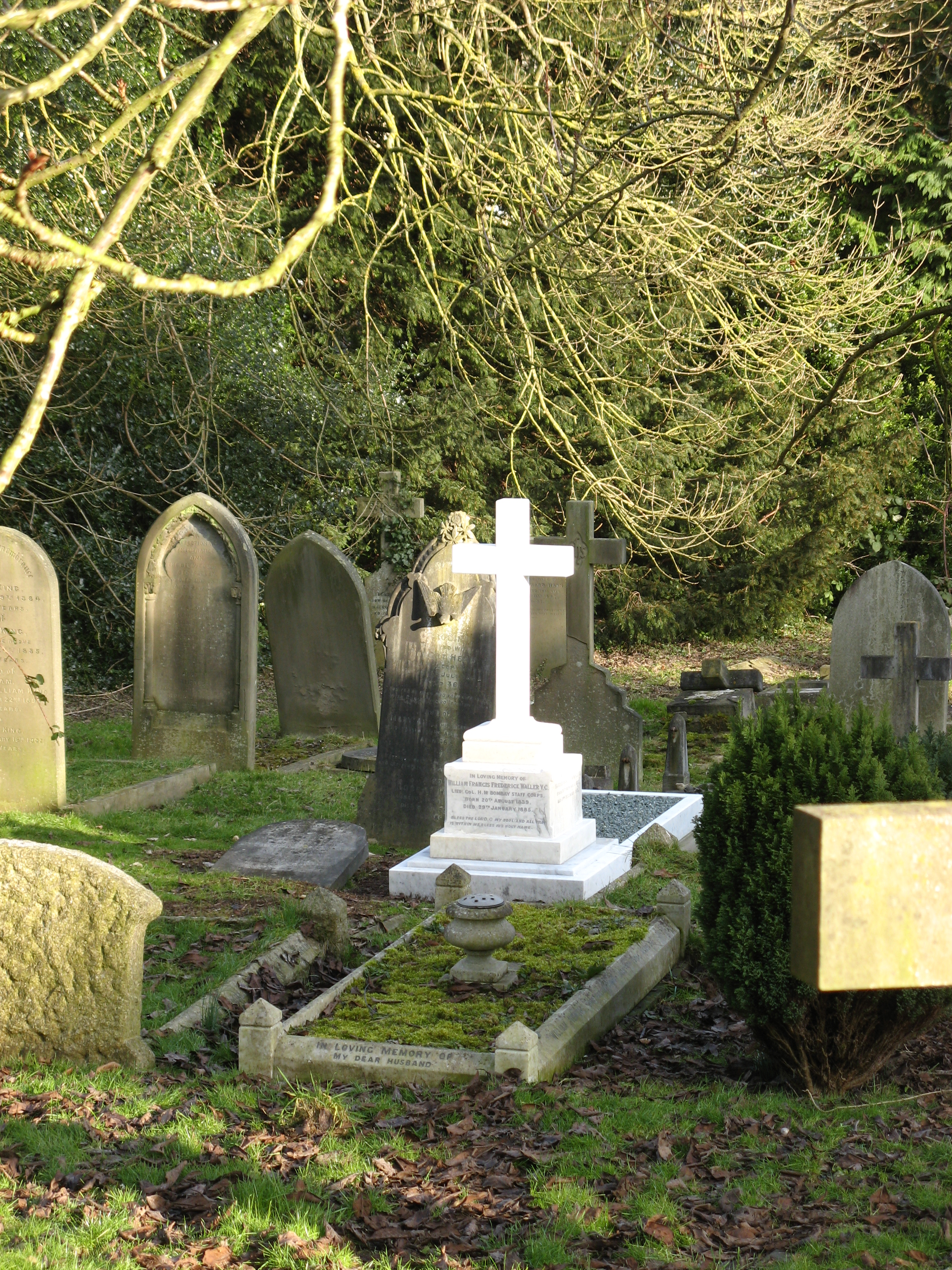
Grave in Locksbrook Cemetery, Bath

Waller was born at Dagoolie, India, on 20 August 1839. He was the son of Thomas Waller & his wife Alicia Ann née Gilbert. He married Mary Anna Grierson on 16 June 1864 at Bombay, India.

Waller was eighteen years old, and a lieutenant in the 25th Bombay Light Infantry during the Indian Mutiny. On 20 June 1858 at Gwalior, British India, Waller and another officer who was killed during the action, Lieutenant Rose, were the only Europeans present at the storming of the Gwalior Fort. With a handful of men they organised a surprise attack by night on the fort, climbing onto the roof of a house, shooting the gunners who opposed them, and, after hand-to-hand fighting, taking the fort, killing everyone in it. Rose was killed, but for his part in the action Waller was awarded the Victoria Cross. His citation read:

For great gallantry at the capture by storm of the fortress of Gwalior, on the 20th June, 1858. He and Lieutenant Rose, who was killed, were the only Europeans present, and, with a mere handful of men, they attacked the fortress, climbed -on the roof of a house, shot the gunners opposed to them, carried all before them, and took the fort, killing every man in it.

However, the award was not gazetted until 25 February 1862.

He later transferred to the Indian Political Department and achieved the rank of colonel. He died at Bath, Somerset, on 29 January 1885 and is buried there in the Locksbrook Cemetery. His VC is on display in the Lord Ashcroft Gallery at the Imperial War Museum, London.

== Family ==
Waller married and had children, including Frederick Charles Livingston Waller.
