= Chhelu Ram =

Recipient of the Victoria Cross

- Born: 10 May 1905; Dinod, Bhiwani, Punjab Province (British India)
- Died: 20 April 1943 (aged 37); Djebel Garci, French Tunisia
- Burial place: Sfax War Cemetery, Tunisia
- Military career
- Allegiance: British India
- Branch: British Indian Army
- Rank: Company Havildar-Major
- Units: 4th Battalion, 6th Rajputana Rifles
- Conflicts: World War II; North African campaign; Tunisian campaign (DOW)
- Awards: Victoria Cross

Chhelu Ram VC (10 May 1905 – 20 April 1943) was an Indian recipient of the Victoria Cross, the highest and most prestigious award for gallantry in the face of the enemy that can be awarded to British and Commonwealth forces. He was born to Ch Jiram Garhwal in a Jat family in Dinod village near Bhiwani then part of Hisar district of Punjab Province of British India.

== Death ==
On the night of 19–20 April 1943 at Djebel Garci, Tunisia, the advance of a battalion of the 5th Indian Infantry Brigade was held up by machine-gun and mortar fire. He gave the rallying cry "Jat aur Musalmano aage badho dhava bolo" [Jats and Muslims, there must be no withdrawal! We will advance! Advance!] while attacking. Company Havildar-Major Chhelu Ram dashed forward with a Tommy-gun, killed the occupants of a machine-gun post, and then went to the aid of his company commander who had become a casualty. While doing so he was himself wounded, but taking command of the company, he led them in hand-to-hand fighting. He was again wounded, but continued rallying his men until he died.
