= Digendra Kumar =

Recipient of Maha Vir Chakra

Havildar Digendra Kumar MVC, SM
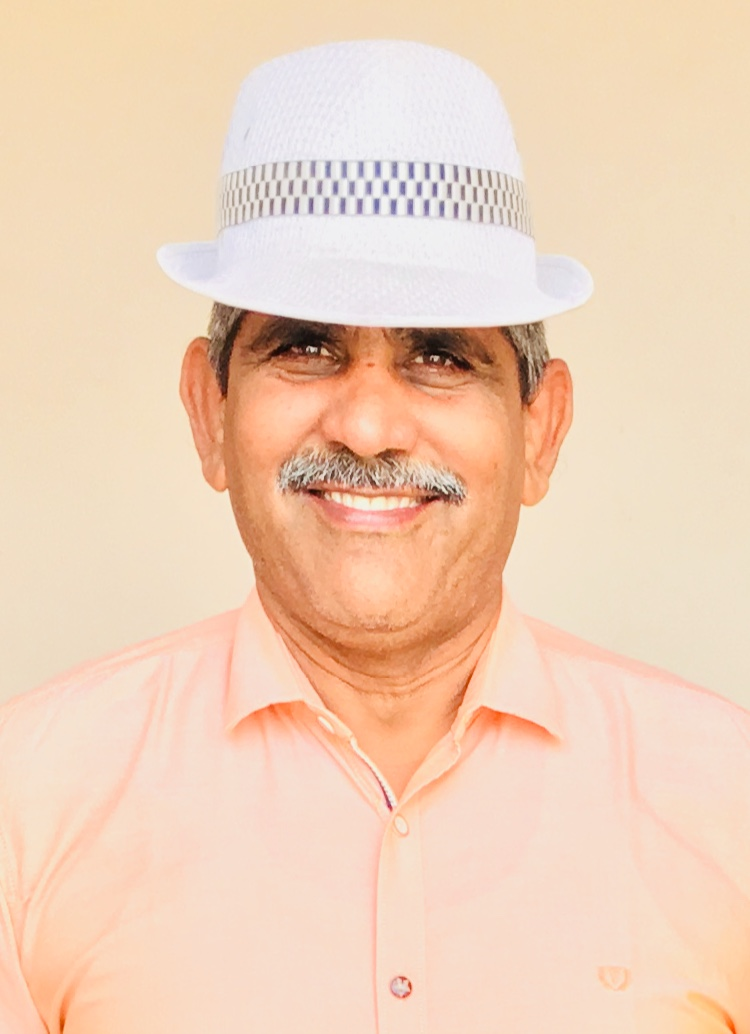
- Born: 3 July 1969 (age 57); Neem Ka Thana, Sikar, Rajasthan
- Military career
- Allegiance: Republic of India
- Branch: Indian Army
- Service years: 1985–2005
- Conflicts: Kargil War
- Awards: Maha Vir Chakra

Digendra Kumar Paraswal MVC, SM (born 3 July 1969) is a former soldier of the 2nd battalion of the Rajputana Rifles regiment of the Indian army. He was awarded the Mahavir Chakra on 15 August 1999, for his acts of bravery in the Kargil War. He retired from the army on 31 July 2005.

== Early life ==
Kumar was born to Shivdan Singh and lived in the village of Jhalara Jat, Tehsil Neem-Ka-Thana, in the Sikar District in Rajasthan, India. His mother's name was Rajkaur. Shivdan Singh was a strong follower of Arya Samaj. Digendra Kumar joined the Indian Army and was badly wounded in Indo-Pakistani War of 1999. Kumar has a daughter (Samita) and two sons (Japender and Mahaveer). Mahaveer studied in Sanskar School Jaipur and is a national basketball player and the former captain of Rajasthan. Japender studies in Delhi Technological University (formerly DCE). Samita is a national Kabaddi player.

== Career ==
Kumar joined the 2nd Battalion of the Rajputana Rifles on 3 September 1985. After training was completed, his battalion was posted to Kashmir. In 1987 he was selected for the Indian Peace Keeping Force and took part in Operation Pawan in Sri Lanka.

=== Operation Pawan ===
Operation Pawan was the code name assigned to operations by the Indian Peace Keeping Force to take control of Jaffna from the LTTE in late 1987. Kumar and his group were assigned to patrol dominant areas in Tamil. Five Tamil militants fired and killed five soldiers from Kumar's squad. In return, Kumar and the remaining soldiers of his squad followed the militants into the house of an MLA. However, the MLA opposed the action, and in the ensuing firefight the MLA, along with the five Tamil militants, was killed. This caused some controversy, and Kumar was penalised and remanded.

Meanwhile, 36 soldiers of the 10th Parachute Regiment were surrounded by all sides expect a canal held by the LTTE. Lt. Gen. A.S. Kalkat assigned the task of freeing them to Kumar. Kumar took with him 50 kg ammunition and some biscuits and sailed up the river. Kumar saved the soldiers (who had been held in the forest for 72 hours), destroyed an important ammunition depot, and killed 39 militants.

== Kargil war ==
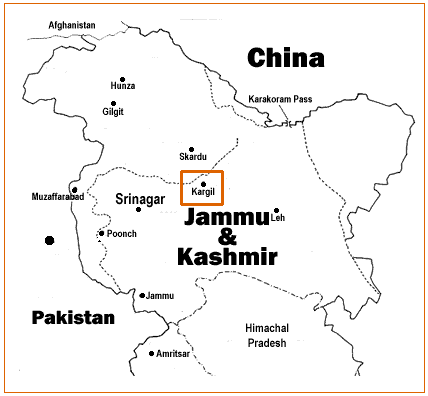
Kargil in Jammu and Kashmir

Major Vivek Gupta, of the 2nd Battalion of the Rajputana Rifles and his company were given the task of recapturing Point 4590 on Tololing Hill in the Dras sector. The objective was to capture the enemy post, located at high altitude (15,000 feet).

Kumar commanded the Light Machine Gun Group during his company's assault. Besides Kumar, the commando team included Major Vivek Gupta, Subedar Bhanwar Lal Bhakar, Subedar Surendra Singh Rathor, Lance Naik Jasvir Singh, Naik Surendra, Naik Chaman Singh Tewatia, Lans Naik Bachchan Singh, CMH Jashvir Singh, and Havaldar Sultan Singh Narwar.

The Pakistani army had made 11 bunkers on the Tololing hilltop. Kumar was to target the first and the last bunkers. The other commandos were to target the remaining 9 bunkers.

On 13 June 1999, while nearing its objective, the Assault Group came under enemy fire and took casualties. Subedar Bhanwar Lal Bhakar, Lance Naik Jasvir Singh, Naik Surendra, and Naik Chaman Singh were all killed. Major Vivek Gupta himself was killed by a bullet wound to the head. Although Kumar was hit by a bullet in his left arm, he kept firing on the enemy with his light machine gun. His fire facilitated his men's advancement, allowing them to physically assault the enemy position and clear the area after a hand-to-hand fight. He was responsible for killing 48 Pakistani soldiers single-handedly and received total 18 bullets on his body armour.

== Medals and awards ==
=== Mahavir Chakra ===
The nation's second-highest wartime gallantry award, the Mahavir Chakra, was awarded to Kumar on 15 August 1999, for daring actions and service to his country during the Kargil War, specifically by occupying Tololing Hill.

=== Other awards ===
Kumar was awarded the Sena Medal in 1993 for his anti-terrorist operations in the Kupwara area of Jammu-Kashmir. In 1994 his services were appreciated for recapturing the Hazratbal Shrine from terrorists.

== In popular culture ==
The 2003 Bollywood war film LOC Kargil is based on the Kargil War. It was written and directed by J. P. Dutta. Actor Avtar Gill played the role of Digendra Kumar.
