= 122nd Rajputana Infantry =

Military unit of the British Indian Army

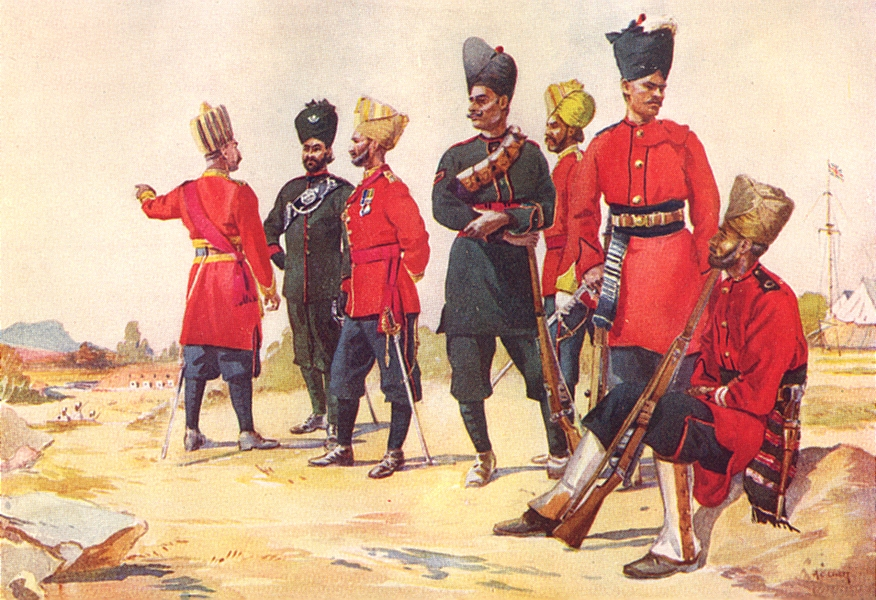
- A soldier of the 122nd Rajputana Infantry (far right) amongst other troops form the British Indian Army
- Active: 1818–1922
- Country: Indian Empire
- Branch: Army
- Type: Infantry
- Part of: Bombay Army (to 1895); Bombay Command
- Colors: Red; faced dark green, 1882 emerald green
- Engagements: Boxer Rebellion; World War I

The 122nd Rajputana Infantry were an infantry regiment of the British Indian Army. The regiment traces their origins to 1818, when they were raised as the 2nd Battalion, 11th Regiment of Bombay Native Infantry.

The regiments first action was during the Boxer Rebellion, they also served in World War I

After World War I the Indian government reformed the army moving from single battalion regiments to multi battalion regiments. In 1922, the 122nd Rajputana Infantry became the 3rd (Prince of Wales's Own), 6th Rajputana Rifles. After independence they were one of the regiments allocated to the Indian Army.

== Predecessor names ==
- 2nd Battalion, 11th Regiment of Bombay Native Infantry - 1818
- 22nd Bombay Native Infantry - 1824
- 22nd Bombay Infantry - 1885
- 122nd Rajputana Infantry - 1903
- 3rd Battalion 6th Rajputana Rifles -1921
- 3rd Battalion The Rajputana Rifles -1947

== Commanding officers ==
Name	Period
Lt. Col. J. Cunningham	1 January 1818 – 14 October 1824
Lt. Col. Brackley Kennel	26 October 1824 – 19 December 1827
Captain J. Clarke	December 1828 – 1832
Major J.D. Crozier	1832 – February 1834
Captain J. Clarke	February 1834 – May 1836
Captain J. Donabin	1836
Captain J.W. Hart
Captain J. Hale	1837
Major H. Cracklow	1837 – 23 March 1846
Major J. Hale 1846	1848
Major R.L. Shawe	1 November 1848 – 6 November 1852
Captain C.E. Beale	1852
Captain J.D. Leckie	9 May 1853 – 1854
Lt. Col. A. Shepheard	16 April 1854 – 5 May 1856
Lt. Col. H.E. Jacob	6 May 1856 – 12 January 1858
Capt E.C. Beale	12 January 1858 – February 1859
Major H. Boye	18 February 1859 – 15 June 1860
Major E.C. Beale	4 October 1860 – 21 October 1871
Colonel H.E. Jacob	18 November 1871 – 2 August 1876
Lt. Col. T. Nuttall	2 August 1876 – 20 April 1877
Colonel J. Fairbrother	20 April 1877 – 7 February 1882
Colonel J.H. Drummond	7 February 1882 – 19 September 1888
Colonel De L.R.F. Woolridge	20 September 1888 – 2 November 1889
Lt. Col. W.A. Weatherall	2 November 1889 – 8 November 1896
Lt. Col. J.F.C. Thatoner	8 November 1896 – 7 February 1900
Lt. Col. R. Baillie	30 May 1900 – 30 May 1907
Lt. Col. W.G. Heatherall	31 May 1907 – 30 May 1912
Lt. Col. K.J.C. Dunolly	31 May 1912 – 1 April 1917
Lt. Col. P.C.R. Barclay	2 April 1917 – 31 March 1921
Lt. Col. J. D'Oyly	1 April 1921 – 31 March 1925

== Regimental War Memorial ==
A memorial to the Rajputana Rifles in the form of a marble Chhatri (canopy) was constructed in 1925 at Nasirabad after formation of Sixth Rajputana Rifle Group in 1921/22. This was to commemorate 2,058 of all ranks of the regiment who had been killed during World War I. The 20-foot high memorial is a Makrana marble dome supported by six pillars. Each pillar represented a battalion of the Rajputana Rifle Group and was engraved with the crest of the battalion. A complete roll of honour was buried beneath a central plaque on which was engraved 23 battle honours earned by the regiment during the war. The memorial was unveiled at Nasirabad on 28 January 1927 by Lieutenant General Sir John Shea, KCB, KCNG, DSO, the then Adjutant General in India.

== Sources ==
- Barthorp, Michael; Burn, Jeffrey (1979). Indian infantry regiments 1860-1914. Osprey Publishing. ISBN 0-85045-307-0.
- Rinaldi, Richard A (2008). Order of Battle British Army 1914. Ravi Rikhye. ISBN 978-0-9776072-8-0.
- Sharma, Gautam (1990). Valour and sacrifice: famous regiments of the Indian Army. Allied Publishers. ISBN 81-7023-140-X.
- Sumner, Ian (2001). The Indian Army 1914-1947. Osprey Publishing. ISBN 1-84176-196-6.
- Moberly, Frederick James (1927) [1923]. The Campaign in Mesopotamia 1914–1918. History of the Great War Based on Official Documents. Vol. I. London: HMSO. OCLC 772784341.
- Singh, Colonel Dr Narendar (2019) ''Third Battalion The Rajputana Rifles 'Waffadar Paltan' Volume 1 1818-1920 (New Delhi: Pentagon Press) ISBN 978-93-86618-92-4
- Singh, Colonel Dr Narendar (2020) ''Third Battalion The Rajputana Rifles 'Gods Own' Volume 2 1921-2018 (New Delhi: Pentagon Press) ISBN 978-81-944659-2-8
- Historical Records of 122 Rajputana Infantry. British India press. 1908.
