= 120th Rajputana Infantry =

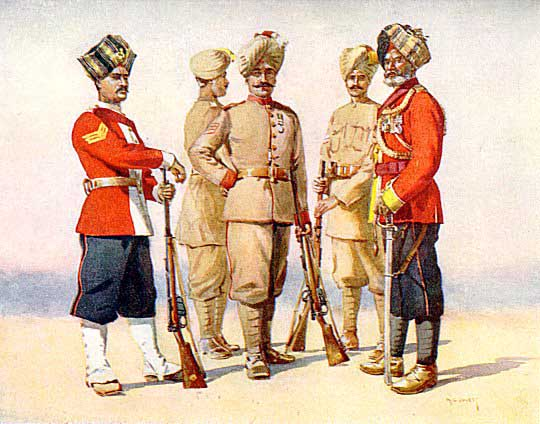
- A painting depicting members of the Rajputanta Rifles, of all ranks and uniforms. circa. 1911
- Active: 1817–1922
- Country: British India
- Branch: Army
- Type: Infantry
- Part of: Bombay Army (to 1895); Bombay Command
- Colors: Red; faced yellow
- Engagements: Anglo-Persian War; World War I

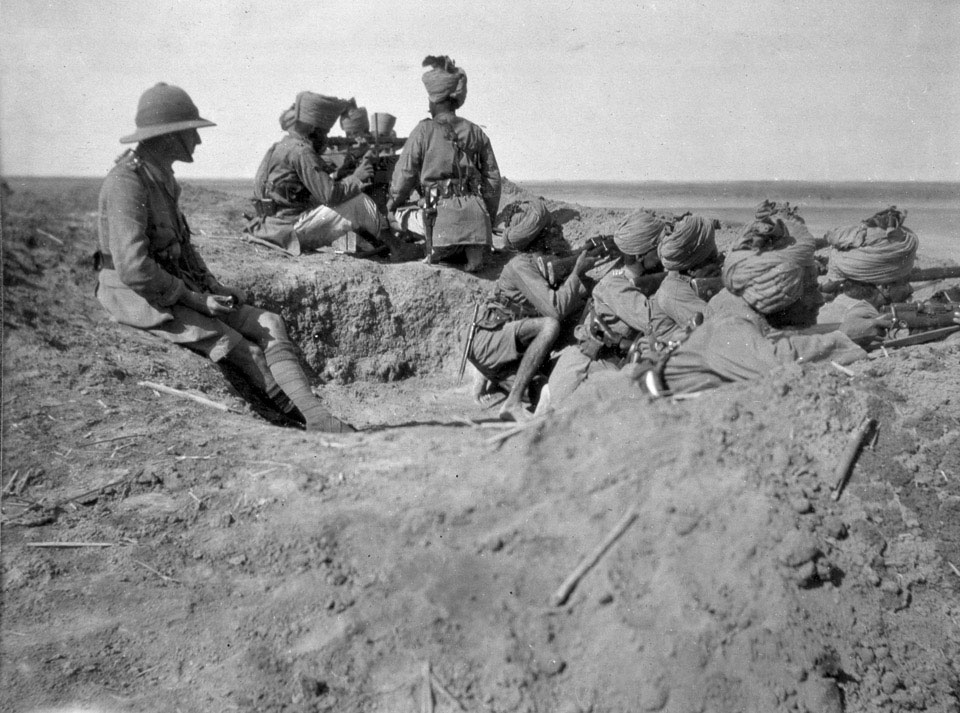
Troops of the 120th Rajputana Infantry train with a machine-gun and rifles in Mesopotamia, January 1915.

The 120th Rajputana Infantry were an infantry regiment of the British Indian Army. The regiment traces their origins to 1817, when they were raised as the 2nd Battalion, 10th Regiment of Bombay Native Infantry.

The regiments first action was during the Anglo-Persian War in 1856, for which they were awarded the battle honours of Persia, Reshire, Bushire and Koosh-ah. During World War I they were attached to the 6th (Poona) Division and served in the Mesopotamian campaign. They fought in the Battle of Basra, the Battle of Qurna, the Battle of Es Sinn before being delivered a setback at the Battle of Ctesiphon. Following this engagement, they withdrew to Kut. Trapped in the city during the Siege of Kut they were forced to surrender after 147 days. A second battalion was raised from men on leave and reinforcements and sent to Mesopotamia.

After World War I the Indian government reformed the army moving from single battalion regiments to multi battalion regiments. In 1922, the 120th Rajputana Infantry became the 2nd (Prince of Wales's Own), 6th Rajputana Rifles. After independence they were one of the regiments allocated to the Indian Army.

== Predecessor names ==
- 2nd Battalion, 10th Regiment of Bombay Native infantry - 1817
- 20th Bombay Native infantry - 1824
- 20th Bombay infantry - 1885
- 120th Rajputana Infantry - 1903

== Sources ==
- Barthorp, Michael; Burn, Jeffrey (1979). Indian infantry regiments 1860-1914. Osprey Publishing. ISBN 0-85045-307-0.
- Moberly, Frederick James (1927) [1923]. The Campaign in Mesopotamia 1914–1918. History of the Great War Based on Official Documents. Vol. I. London: HMSO. OCLC 772784341.
- Rinaldi, Richard A (2008). Order of Battle British Army 1914. Ravi Rikhye. ISBN 978-0-9776072-8-0.
- Sharma, Gautam (1990). Valour and sacrifice: famous regiments of the Indian Army. Allied Publishers. ISBN 81-7023-140-X.
- Singh, Narendar (2019). Third Battalion The Rajputana Rifles "Waffadr Paltan" Volume 1 1818-1920. New Delhi: Pentagon Press. ISBN 978-93-86618-92-4.
- Sumner, Ian (2001). The Indian Army 1914-1947. Osprey Publishing. ISBN 1-84176-196-6.
