= Operation Safed Sagar =

1999 Indian military operation

Operation Safed Sager
- Part of the Kargil War
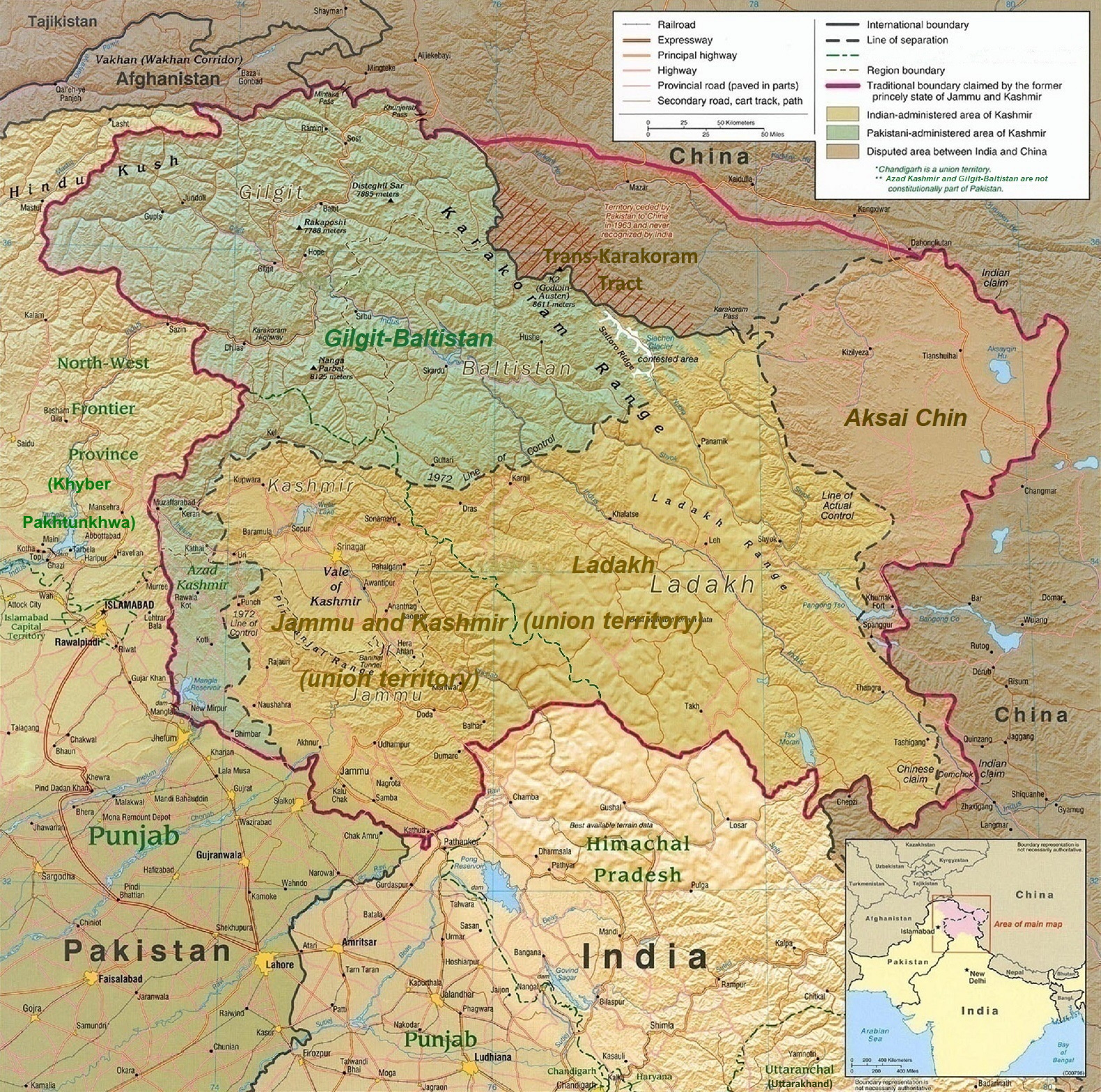
- Disputed Kashmir region, with Kargil
| Date | 3 May – 26 July 1999 (2 months, 3 weeks and 2 days) |
| Location | Kargil district, Jammu and Kashmir (now Ladakh), India |
| Result | Indian Victory |

Belligerents
| India | Pakistan |

Operation Safed Sagar ( lit. "Operation White Ocean") was the code name assigned to the combined arms operation by the Indian Air Force, supporting elements of the Indian Army during the 1999 Kargil war that was aimed at flushing out regular and irregular troops of the Pakistani Army from vacated Indian Positions in the Kargil sector along the Line of Control. It was the first large scale use of airpower in the Jammu and Kashmir region since the Indo-Pakistani War of 1971.

== Background ==
The Indo-Pakistani wars and conflicts includes the Kashmir conflict and its subsidiary conflicts such Siachen conflict and Trans-Karakoram Tract, which are the disputed territories of India and Pakistan on the India-Pakistan border. Previously, during the Siachen conflict, Indian forces had managed to dislodge Pakistani troops during a takeover attempt at the Siachen glacier. A ceasefire treaty had been proposed to mitigate further conflict in the area, with negotiations being conducted in Delhi during November 1992. However this agreement was not signed.

Following a series of Nuclear tests by India and Pakistan in 1998, both nations agreed to sign the Lahore Declaration on 21 February 1999 to prevent a mutually catasrophic arms race and avoid conflict in the region. This was met with dismay by elements of the Pakistani Armed Forces who had in the precending months covertly trained and sent Pakistani troops and paramilitary forces, some allegedly in the guise of mujahideen, into territory on the Indian side of the LOC. The infiltration was codenamed "Operation Badr"; its aim was to sever the link between Kashmir and Ladakh, and cause Indian forces to withdraw from the Siachen Glacier, thus forcing India to negotiate a more favorable settlement of the broader Kashmir dispute.

== Prelude ==
=== Operation Badr ===
The Kargil conflict was triggered in early 1999 by the infiltration of Pakistani troops—disguised as Kashmiri militants—into strategic positions on the Indian side of the line of control which serves as the de facto border between the two countries in the disputed region of Kashmir. During its initial stages, Pakistan blamed the fighting entirely on independent Kashmiri insurgents, but documents left behind by casualties and later statements by Pakistan's Prime Minister and Chief of Army Staff showed the involvement of Pakistani paramilitary forces, led by General Ashraf Rashid.

Initial infiltrations were noticed in Kargil in early May 1999. Because of the extreme winter weather in Kashmir, it was common practice for the Indian and Pakistan Army to temporarily abandon forward posts and reoccupy them in the spring. That particular spring, the Pakistan Army started reoccupying the forward posts well before the scheduled time. In a preliminary step in their bid to capture Kashmir, they reoccupied not only their own posts, but also 132 posts that belonged to India.

By the second week of May, an ambush on an Indian army patrol acting on a tip-off by a local shepherd in the Batalik sector led to the exposure of the infiltration. Initially with little knowledge of the nature or extent of the encroachment, the Indian troops in the area initially claimed that they would evict them within a few days. However, reports of infiltration elsewhere along the LoC soon made it clear that the entire plan of attack was on a much bigger scale.

=== Operation Vijay ===
The Indian Armed Forces responded with Operation Vijay, a mobilisation of 200,000 Indian troops towards the region. However, because of the nature of the terrain, division and corps operations could not be mounted; the scale of most fighting was often at the regimental or battalion level. In effect, two divisions of the Indian Army, numbering 20,000, along with several thousand from the Paramilitary forces of India and the Indian Air Force were deployed in the conflict zone. The intruders were found to be well entrenched and while artillery attacks had produced results in certain areas, more remote ones needed the help of the air force. To avoid further escalation of conflict between the two nuclear-armed states, the Government of India cleared limited use of Air Power on May 25, more than three weeks after first reports, with the instructions that IAF fighter jets will remain within Indian territory to launch attack on intruder's position within Indian territory and IAF was not permitted to cross the Line of Control under any circumstance. A back and forth tussle initially ensured between the Indian Army, who specifically wanted Attack helicopters and the Indian Air Force, who stated that their dedicated Attack helicopters would not be able to fly at high altitude, and converted transport helicopters where not sufficiently protected. The IAF instead offered fixed-wing aircraft and put many squadrons of the Western and Northern command on High alert and prepared aircraft for QRA roles. However, the IAF also conceded a squadron of Mi-17 to attack duties.

== Combat operations ==
=== Early operations ===
The Indian Air Force (IAF) had been carrying out routine Electronic intelligence (ELINT), photo and aerial reconnaissance from early May. A IAF Mi-17 was hit by light ground fire on one of these sorties on May 12.On May 21, a Canberra PR57 from the 106 Squadron flown by Sqn Ldr A Perumal and Sqn Ldr UK Jha took off on a reconnaissance mission and descended to 22,000 feet and entered a racetrack pattern that put the aircraft as low as 4,000 feet above the ridgelines. Near the end of this sortie, the plane was hit by an Anza MANPADS crew. The plane returned to the IAF base at Srinagar, on one engine and the crew landed safely. The Indian Government, intent on not provoking escalation, thereafter cleared limited use of offensive and full use of defensive Air Power on May 25, restricted entirely to the Indian side of the Line of Control. Srinagar Airport was at this time closed to civilian air-traffic and dedicated to the Indian Air Force. Concurrently, IAF Jaguars were deployed to Leh with both strike and recon roles in mind. At this point, the Army acceded to the IAF's call to provide fixed wing aircraft.

=== First bombing campaign ===
The Indian Air Force (IAF) flew its first air support missions on 26 May, operating from the Indian airfields of Srinagar, Awantipora and Adampur. An early morning flight of Ground attack aircraft such as MiG-21s, MiG-23s, MiG-27s, Jaguars and helicopter gunships struck insurgent positions at 6:30 A.M in the morning. The newly formed squadrons of Su-30MK's which had been only recently delivered from Russia where re-deployed to Gujarat. Additional units in Srinagar were put on high alert and standby. Initially, the first flights by Fighter units were tasked with conducting air-to-ground live firing drills at a nearby high-altitude firing range, as well as area familiarisation sorties prior to combat. IAF helicopters and transport aircraft also created a larger logistics chain for the Indian Army.

MiG-21's from the 17th Squadron were tasked with Photo reconnaissance while the MiG-23s from the 9th and 221st Squadron conducted airstrikes. Some MiG-21s also were rigged to carry WW2-era 1,000 kilo bombs from the IAF's reserve inventory, which were often used on snow-covered peaks to artificially trigger avalanches. The MiG-21 fleet operated without modern navigation equipment and pilots co-ordinated their missions using commercial handheld GPS receivers, with pilots often calculating lofted bomb trajectories and measured wind directions before dropping their payloads at pre-determined locations. It was the first use of SATNAV systems by any IAF jet and was also used by helicopter pilots. The MiG-21 fleet started operations after May 29 following successful demonstration of their viability in bombing roles. The initial strikes had the Air Defence versions of the MiG-21s and (later) MiG-29s providing fighter cover. However, operating at high altitudes proved extremely challenging for the ageing MiG-21 that formed the backbone of the IAF, limiting its effectiveness as a fighter aircraft. Despite this shortcoming, it remained the most deployed aircraft in the conflict.

Twelve MiG-23's from the No.9 and No.221 squadrons were deployed during this conflict. The MiG-23BNs and MiG-27s made vital contributions towards softening high-value targets in the areas of Muntho Dhalo, Batalik, Drass, Kargil and Mashkoh. IAF MiG-23's flew over 155 missions and flew at the Battle of Tiger Hill utilising their heavy cannons,57 mm rockets and 500 kg bombs to neutralise enemy targets. The MiG-23's would claim the highest bombing rates of any IAF aircraft as they were being the only aircraft type capable of deploying their maximum weapon load at altitude.

=== Initial IAF losses ===
Air Chief Marshal A.Y. Tipnis had been left out of the formal communication loop at the time of detection of infiltrators, with the First bombardment campaign being done with poor intelligence and higher risks. This led to the loss of IAF assets during this period. The Indian Army also was unable in the initial stages of the war to provide proper targeting co-ordinates for IAF attack aircraft.

The IAF was also unable to utilise its fleet of Mil Mi-25 attack helicopters to support Indian army advances because of the extreme altitude prevented it from carrying a useful weapons load. Thereafter, the IAF relied on its larger fleet of Mil Mi-17 transport helicopters, repurposed as gunships and deployed them from Tololing. An additional problem encountered by the IAF was shortage of fuses for its 1,000 pound bombers, which was mitigated by fitting them with a modified pistol cartridge. US-made Paveway bombs were subsequently delivered to IAF units.

==== 26 May Mig-27 shootdown ====
Flt. Lt. Kambampati Nachiketa, a Mikoyan MiG-27 pilot from the No. 9 Squadron IAF (Wolfpack) took part in a strike in the Batalik Sector on 26 May 1999. Armed with 80mm rockets and the aircraft's 30mm cannon, Nachiketa attacked a fortified enemy position. He was part of a four-aircraft strike group, with his MiG-27 as the trailing unit four kilometers behind the main strike force. The other pilots were Group Captain Anupam Banerjee, Wing Commander Bhupendra Khatana and Group Captain Ashwani Mandokhot. The mission objective was to strike the Muthudalo complex. During the operation, the aircraft took a hit from an Anza surface-to-air missile of the Pakistan Army Air Defence Corps, and Nachiketa was forced to eject. After ejecting, Nachiketa evaded immediate capture but after two to three hours, a Pakistani army patrol captured him. Nachiketa continued to fire his service pistol until he ran out of bullets. He was taken to a prison in Rawalpindi where he was beaten up by Pakistani soldiers until a senior officer intervened. Speaking to NDTV in 2016, Nachiketa said:

The jawans who had captured me were trying to manhandle me and maybe trying to kill me because, for them, I was just an enemy pilot who had fired on their locations from the air... Fortunately, the officer who came was very mature. He realised the situation that I am now a captive and now I need not be handled that way. So he was able to control them, which was a big effort because they were very aggressive at that stage.

==== 27 May Mig-21 shootdown ====
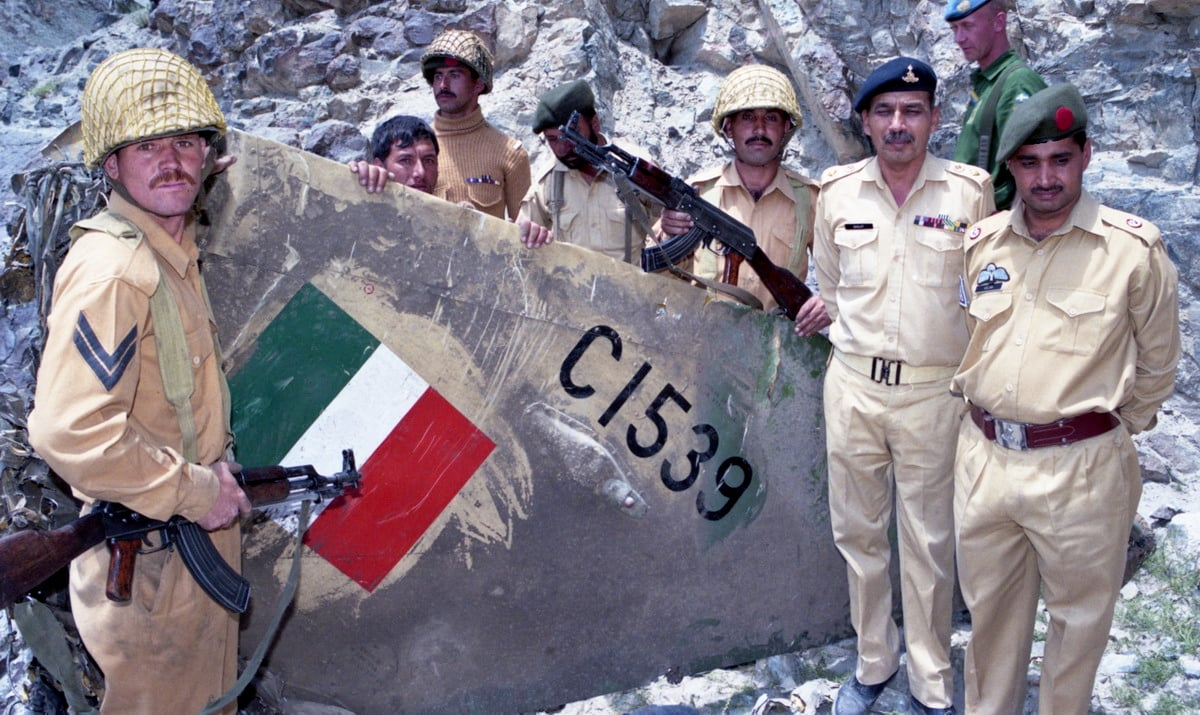
Pakistani soldiers with remains of Ajay Ahuja's MiG-21 that was shot down by MANPADS

On 27 May Squadron Leader Ajay Ahuja was undertaking a photo reconnaissance mission, after another member of the mission, Flt Lt Nachiketa ejected from his MiG-27L after an engine flame out the day before. Sqn Ldr Ahuja stayed over enemy positions to help the rescue attempts knowing full well the existence of enemy surface-to-air missiles in the area. He attempted to guide in an Mi-17 rescue helicopter to a suspected crash site. However, his MiG-21MF fighter, C-1539, was hit by a shoulder-fired FIM-92 Stinger. Ahuja gave a radio call – "Hercules, something has hit my plane, possibility of missile hit cannot be ruled out, I am ejecting over...(location).". IAF authorities lost track of his aircraft and all communication shortly afterward. According to the data released by the Indian Air Force, Ahuja's aircraft had crossed the Line of Control, and the IAF claimed he was killed by Pakistani Soldiers after landing safely as his post-mortem report says that he had two fatal bullet injuries and fractured knee which was caused when he landed after ejection (shows that he was alive when landed). However, these claims were strictly rejected by Pakistan. Sqn Leader Ahuja's body would be recovered by the men of the 10th Battalion of the Garhwal Rifles.

==== 28 May Mi-17 shootdown ====
On May 28, 1999, a finger-four Mi-17 helicopter flight codenamed Nubra Formation was tasked with striking the Point 5140 feature, located two kilometres north of Tololing. During the strikes, an Mi-17 piloted by Squadron leader Rajiv Pundir was shot down- with the loss of all four of the crew- when it was hit by three Stinger missiles while on an offensive sortie in the Tololing sector. The aircraft was the trailing helicopter in four aircraft flight, and was also not equipped with armour or infrared countermeasures. These losses forced the Indian Air Force to reassess its strategy. The helicopters were immediately withdrawn from offensive roles as a measure against the MANPADS in possession of the infiltrators.

=== Successive bombardment campaign ===
Following dismal failure of daylight strafing and low-altitude bombing, IAF MiG-21s, MiG-23s and MiG-27s only flew High-altitude flights with GPS-guided bombs. Emergency procurements enabled the Mirage 2000 fleet, then deemed the best aircraft in the IAF inventory capable of optimum performance under the conditions of high-altitude seen in the zone of conflict, to be used extensively. The aircraft were equipped with Israeli AN/AAQ-28 Litening pods before the installation of laser guided bombs by mid-June in 1999. The IAF MiG-29 fleet, equipped with the R-77 BVR missiles, were tasked to provide escort for bombers prior to being tasked to Independent air patrols. The IAF also used its limited fleet of MiG-25RB's to supplement Canberra bombers to conducting reconnaissance missions. Flying at an altitude of Mach 1.3 at 42,000 feet (13 km) above the mountain tops, the larger and high-resolution cameras mounted on the MiG-25 fleet managed to identify Pakistani bases and provide better intelligence of the area.

IAF Mirage 2000's striking their targets on a mountain ledge

Prior to an airstrike, A MiG-25 would fly a low-altitude, Mach 0.95 flight over suspected targets and create exact target mapping for each strike. The unarmed MiG-25's were often escorted by other Mirage 2000's and MiG-29's as they were not designed to fly missions that low over the mountaintops. The MiG-25's would often consume the same amount of fuel on these missions as a High-altitude long range survey mission, necessitating a combat radius of only 400 kilometres at low altitude. This low altitude was necessary to spot individual combat tents and equipment, instead of the large targets the cameras on the MiG-25 were designed to observe. Once a survey mission was complete, the plane would land at Adampur, where a Dornier Do228 transport aircraft would rush the film to facilities in Bareilly for processing. The images and maps would be generated by night and gave strike aircraft the exact coordinates for their missions the following day.

The Mirage 2000 fleet flew its first sortie on 30 May. Armed initially with 250 kg "dumb" bombs, No. 7 Squadron led by Wg Cdr Sandeep Chabra, struck infiltrator positions in Muntho Dhalo, Tiger Hill and Point 4388 in the Drass Sector over a period of three days. The receding snowline in June laid bare the hitherto camouflaged Pakistani positions, opening them up to non-stop day and night attacks by the Mirage 2000 and, subsequently, all aircraft. From May to July 1999, the two Mirage squadrons flew 514 sorties with only three drop outs. Mirage 2000's flying escort for Strike aircraft would arm themselves with Matra R.530D and Magic II missiles, as well as a Remora Electronic warfare pods. Israel was also reported to have covertly provided the IAF with IAI Searcher and IAI Heron drones to supplant aerial observation capabilities.

On 8 June, the IAF engaged targets in the Mushkoh Valley, where the Pakistan Army had many storage dumps and bunkers. By June 16, IAF Jaguars from the Fifth and Fourteenth squadrons were also equipped with photo-reconnaissance equipment as well as LGB bomb kits and accompanied Mirage 2000 during bombing runs. The Jaguar was able to use its GPS guided weapons and INS systems to aid Indian forces in the area with precision strikes. An airstrike was conducted by MiG-27's and Mirage 2000's on Muntho Dhalo, a major supply depot destroyed a major base that was being used by Pakistani forces to supply their troops. Future IAF Air Chief Marshall BS Dhanoa, at that time the commanding officer of the No.17 Squadron would devise improved methods of night bombing at high altitudes which had never been attempted before in MiG-21's, enabling the MiG-21 fleet to undertake CAS missions.

=== Further strikes ===
Through the last weeks of June, the Mirages, armed with LGBs as well as with "dumbs", repeatedly struck the heavily defended Tiger Hill. Only 9 LGBs were used in this war, 8 by the Mirages and one by a Jaguar, as the dumb bombs proved highly effective when paired with the targeting pods.The Tiger Hill campaign successfully eliminated multiple enemy bunkers and a strike on a Pakistani Army battalion HQ behind the mountain was instrumental in killing Five Officers, wiping out a portion of the chain-of-command for the Pakistani Army. Mirages and MiG-29 demolished over eighty structures at Muntho Dalo camp, which was a major supply depot or the Pakistani forces. Extended reconnaissance missions were also carried out by the IAF ahead of a ground assault.

The first of the LGB missions on June 24 were observed by the (then) Chief of Air Staff, ACM AY Tipnis. All LGBs were delivered by two-seaters, with the rear-seat pilot doubling up as a WSO. Such was its accuracy with dumb bombs that an LGB-equipped two-seater would join up as the tail of a 2 or 4-ship formation of other Mirages carrying between 6-12 dumb bombs each, film their attacks, and only if the results were less than optimal, or if it had spotted a Command and Control bunker on its Litening sensor / camera, let loose its LGB. The Mirages and MiG-23s played a vital role during the Battle of Tiger Hill. The aircraft destroyed the Pakistani Northern Light Infantry’s command bunkers on Tiger Hill with two 1,000-pound Paveway II LGBs. The targets were acquired at a range of Nine kilometers and with weapons release at Five kilometers, IAF fighters then moved back to CAP duties. Two Mil Mi-17 helicopters were also prepared to fly at night over Tiger Hill on June 27th after being outfitted fully with armoured cabins and countermeasure dispensers, but were recalled to aid Indian forces in Zoji La following effective artillery strikes.

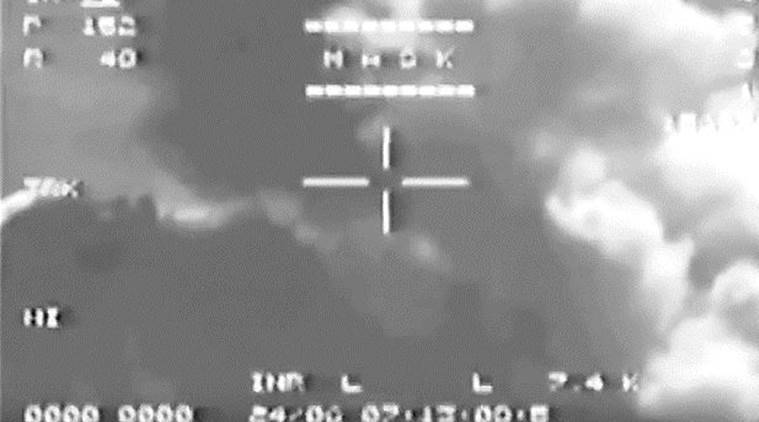
Strike footage from an IAF Mirage 2000 during the Battle of Tiger Hill in 1999

The IAF thereafter used the LGB selectively. All aircraft operated at an altitude of 9–10,000 metres, (~30-33,000 feet above sea level), diving when required and pulling out well out of MANPADs range. The low number of airstrips for take off and landing of the flights also constrained the regularity and efficiency of the attacks. Despite this, there were hundreds of sorties on the intruders with no further material or personnel casualties enabling a gradual takeover of the mountain posts by Indian troops. According to the IAF, the "air strikes against the Pakistani infiltrators, supply camps and other targets yielded rich dividends." Nightly attacks located positions of Pakistani artillery positions which were then targeted and eliminated. From May to July 1999, the two Mirage squadrons flew 514 sorties with only three drop outs. The No. 1 Squadron flew 274 air defence and strike escort missions, and the No. 7 Squadron conducted 240 strike missions during which it dropped over 55,000 kg (121,000 lb) of ordnance. During one such strike, two Mirage 2000s managed to take out over 300 soldiers during a bombing run over a fortified bunker. To prevent Pakistani UAV's from conducting reconnaissance flights, the IAF also deployed few units of its PZL TS-11 Iskra trainers, armed with cannons after trails with the HAL HJT-16 Kiran indicated need for slow-flying, cannon armed aircraft. The few planes so based flew out of Srinagar. The IAF dropped over 500 bombs during this phase, marking the larges air attacks in the area since the IAF Vampires had conducted similar raids in 1971.

=== PAF response ===
The Pakistani Air Force did not partake in any attacks, due to concerns over over-escalating the conflict and the higher range of the Indian BVR missiles. It was also feared as the IAF had a 145 modern air defence fighters such as the Su-30MK, Mirage 2000s and MiG-29s that could engage the 30-strong fleet of PAF F-16s. In overall strength also, the IAF enjoyed a 350-150 advantage over the PAF. At most the fighters could only stay at CAP distances of 20-30 kilometers from the frontlines. Lack of Early warning radars in Skardu also mitigated the PAF decision to not engage IAF planes. This left the IAF free to carry out its attacks with impunity. Nonetheless, the PAF deployed flights of Chengdu F-7's and F-16's out of Minhas, Sargodha and Skardu airbases in Pakistan. IAF Mirage 2000 pilots would later claim that their aircraft had locked onto PAF F-16s conducting CAP within Pakistani territory at a range of 35 kilometres.

== Summary of aerial operations ==
=== Flight summary ===
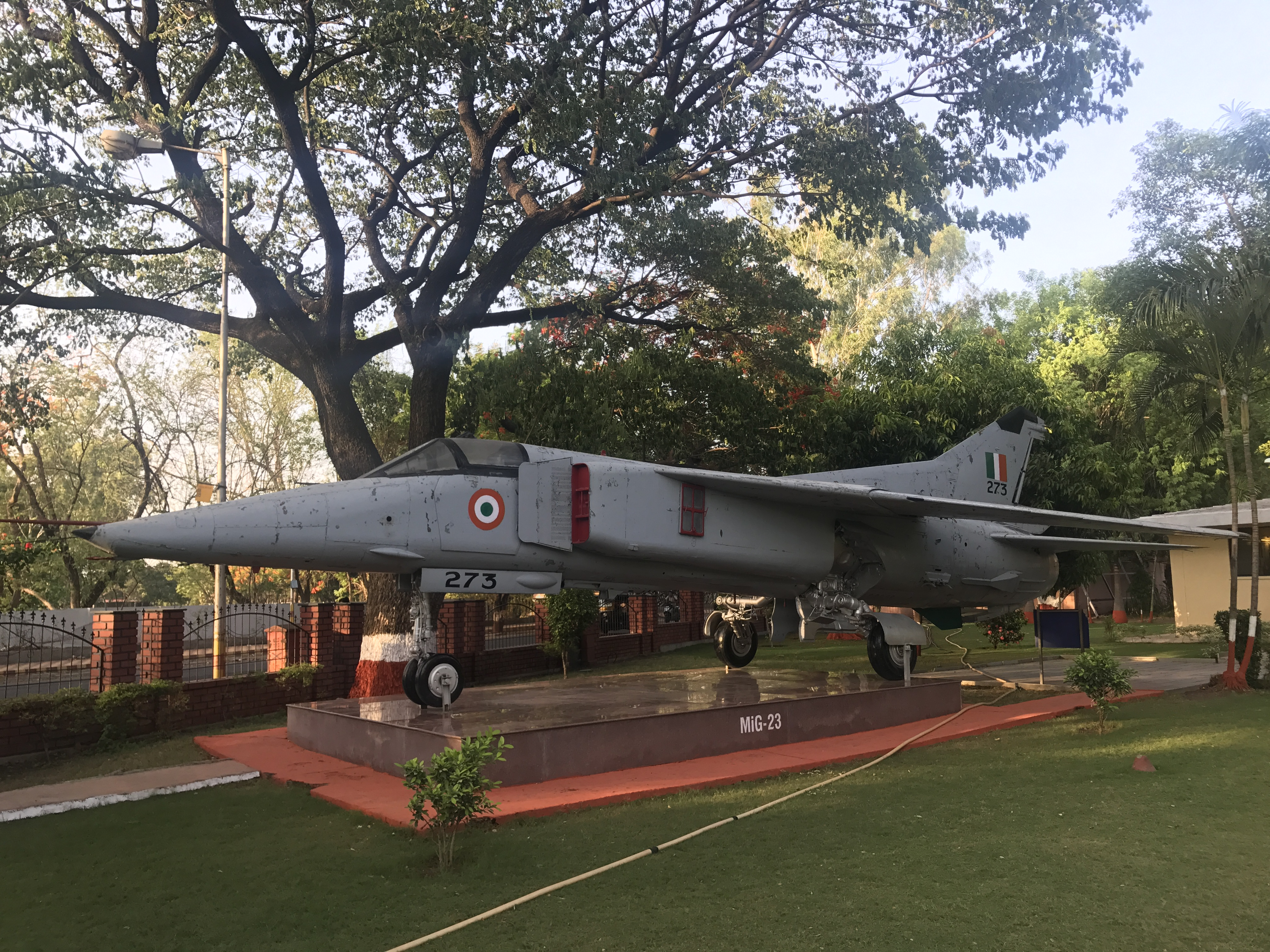
A MiG-23 BN used in Operation Safed Sagar

Breakdown of Total Number of Sorties Flown by Aircraft Type:

| Type | Number of Sorties | % Effort |
|---|---|---|
| Transport | 3427 | 44.9% |
| Helicopters | 2474 | 32.4% |
| Combat aircraft | 1730 | 22.7% |
| Total | 7831 | 100% |

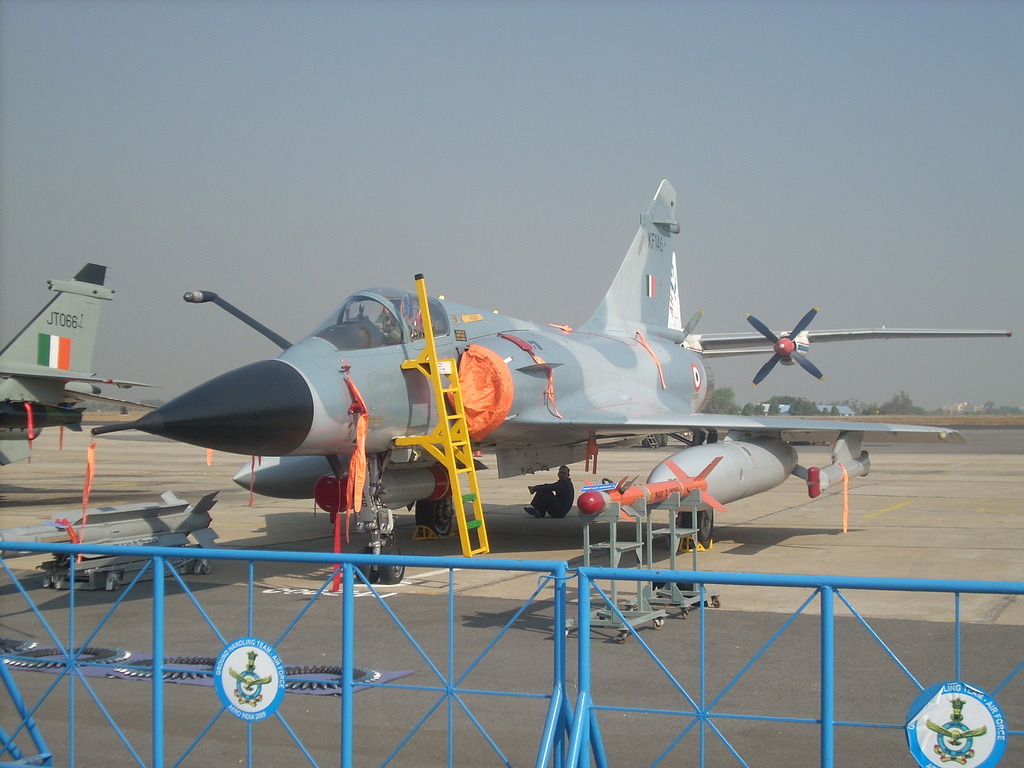
IAF Mirage 2000 was used extensively in Air operations during Kargil war

Breakdown of Air Operations by IAF Combat Aircraft

| Role | Number of Sorties | % Effort |
|---|---|---|
| Air Strikes | 578 | 48% |
| CAP & Escort | 462 | 39% |
| Recce | 159 | 13% |
| Total | 1199 | 100% |

Deployed IAF Combat Aircraft

Deployment of IAF Combat Aircraft
| Operations Base | Number of Aircraft deployed | Aircraft types |
|---|---|---|
| Bareilly | 7 | MiG-25RB |
| Adampur | 46 | Mirage 2000, MiG-29, SEPECAT Jaguar |
| Awantipur | 28 | MiG-21, MiG-29, SEPECAT Jaguar |
| Udhampur | 12 | MiG-21 |
| Srinagar | 34 | MiG-21, MiG-23, MiG-27 |
| Pathankot | 30 | MiG-21, MiG-23 |

=== Indian Air Force Order of Battle ===
IAF Order of Battle
| Squadron number | Squadron Name | Equipment | Commanding Officer |
|---|---|---|---|
Combat Aircraft
| No. 1 Squadron IAF | Tigers | Mirage 2000H | Wing commander S. Neelakanthan |
| No. 7 Squadron IAF | Battle Axes | Mirage 2000H | Wing commander Sandeep Chabbra |
| No. 9 Squadron IAF | Wolfpack | MiG-27ML | Wing commander Avtar Singh |
| No. 14 Squadron IAF | Bulls | SEPECAT Jaguar IS/IB | Wing commander Ashwani Bhakoo |
| No. 17 Squadron IAF | Golden Arrows | MiG-21M | Wing commander BS Dhanoa |
| No. 27 Squadron IAF | Flaming Arrows | SEPECAT Jaguar IS | Wing commander HKJS Shokay |
| No. 28 Squadron IAF | First Supersonics | MiG-29B | Wing commander PM Cherian Wing commander P Randhava |
| No. 51 Squadron IAF | Sword Arms | MiG-21 bis | Wing commander NK Tandon |
| No. 102 Squadron IAF | Trisonics | MiG-25R | Group Captain SP Ojha |
| No. 106 Squadron IAF | Lynxes | Canberra PR.57 | Group Captain RS Chaudhari |
| No. 108 Squadron IAF | Hawkeyes | MiG-21M | Wing commander HS Jalliawala |
| No. 221 Squadron IAF | Valiants | MiG-23 BN | Wing commander Ashit Mehta |
| No. 223 Squadron IAF | Tridents | MiG-29B | Wing commander Sandeep Sud |
Transport aircraft
| No. 25 Squadron IAF | Himalayan Eagles | An-32 / Il-76 | Group Captain SP Singh |
| No. 48 Squadron IAF | Camels | An-32 | Group Captain Mk Devnath |
Helicopter Units
| No. 114 Helicopter Unit IAF | Siachen Pioneers | HAL Cheetah | Wing commander AS Butola |
| No. 129 Helicopter Unit IAF | Nubra Warriors | Mil Mi-17 | Wing commander AK Sinha |
| No. 152 Helicopter Unit IAF | Mighty Armours | Mil Mi-17 | Wing commander S Mittal |
| No. 130 Helicopter Unit IAF | Condors | Mil Mi-8 | |
| No. 132 FAC Flight IAF | | HAL Cheetah | Wing commander OS Ahluwalia |

In addition, the IAF also deployed three observation flights, five radar units, three units of Pechora SAM's as well as a large battery of Osa and Igla units.

== Aftermath ==
The aftermath of Operation Safed Sagar marked a major victory for India in the 1999 Kargil War. The Indian Air Force's precise strikes and coordination with the Army aided Indian forces to recapture all occupied positions. The operation highlighted the challenges of high-altitude warfare and led to significant modernization of the IAF, including the induction of advanced aircraft and precision-guided weapons. Internationally, India gained praise for its restraint in not crossing the Line of Control, while Pakistan faced diplomatic isolation. The war also prompted reforms in India's defence coordination and intelligence systems. It acquired and later started co-developing Sukhoi Su-30MKI heavy fighters with Russia beginning in the early 2000s. Development of the indigenous HAL Tejas was also accelerated.

The IAF’s contribution to Operation Vijay lasted two months. IAF fighters had flown more than 1,700 sorties, including about 40 at night during the campaign’s last weeks. The Indian Air Force was able to coordinate well with the Army and provide air support to the recapture of most of the posts before Pakistan decided to withdraw its remaining troops. All remaining intruders were either killed or withdrew from the area upon conclusion of the war and the operation was ended, being declared a success by the IAF in having achieved its primary objectives. However, there has also been criticism of the methods initially used and the type of planes being unsuitable to the terrain that resulted in early losses. This is believed by many in the Air force as coming as a wake up call to upgrade the ageing fleet of aircraft to better enable them to fight in the mountainous region.

India celebrates the Kargil Vijay Diwas every year on July 26, to mark the successful completion of Operation Vijay and Operation Safed Sagar. The Indian Space Research Organisation also began development of an indigenous SATNAV system called NAVIC following the conflict. IAF pilots was awarded with two Vir Chakras and 23 Vayu Sena Medals for their role in the war.

== In popular culture ==
Netflix had announced a series titled Operation Safed Sagar based upon the events starring Jimmy Shergil in 2025. The series premiered on 7 August 2026 on Netflix.

== See also ==
Borders

- Line of Actual Control (LAC)
- Borders of China
- Borders of India
- Borders of Pakistan

Other related topics

- Awards and decorations of the Indian Armed Forces
- India-China Border Roads
- List of extreme points of India
- Sino-Pakistan Agreement for transfer of Trans-Karakoram Tract to China
- NATO bombing of Yugoslavia : happened in concurrence with Kargil war, also demonstrated utility of airpower
