= 78th =

78th is the ordinal form of the number 78. 78th or Seventy-eighth may also refer to:

- A fraction, 1/78, equal to one of 78 equal parts

== Geography ==
- 78th meridian east, a line of longitude
- 78th meridian west, a line of longitude
- 78th parallel north, a circle of latitude
- 78th parallel south, a circle of latitude
- 78th Street (Manhattan)

== Military ==
- 78th Group Army, People's Republic of China
- 78th Division (disambiguation)
- 78th Regiment (disambiguation)
- 78th Squadron (disambiguation)

== Other ==
- 78th century
- 78th century BC

== See also ==
- 78 (disambiguation)
- 78ers, a group of LGBTQ activists
