= 78 Squadron =

78 Squadron or 78th Squadron may refer to:

- No. 78 Squadron IAF, Indian Air Force
- No. 78 Squadron RAAF, a unit of the Royal Australian Air Force
- No. 78 Squadron RAF, a unit of the United Kingdom Royal Air Force
- 78th Reconnaissance Squadron, a unit of the United States Air Force

== See also ==
- 78th Division (disambiguation)
- 78th Regiment (disambiguation)
