= 78th Brigade =

78th Brigade may refer to:

== Soviet Union ==
- 78th Tank Brigade

== Ukraine ==
- 78th Airborne Assault Brigade

== United Kingdom ==
- 78th Brigade (United Kingdom), British Army infantry formation during World War I
- 78th (Howitzer) Brigade, Royal Field Artillery, British Army unit during World War I
- 78th (Lowland) Brigade, Royal Field Artillery, British Army unit after World War I

== See also ==
- 78th Division (disambiguation)
- 78th Regiment (disambiguation)
