= C78 =

C78 or variation, may refer to:

- Ruy Lopez chess openings ECO code
- Secondary malignant neoplasm of respiratory and digestive organs ICD-10 code
- Medical Examination of Young Persons (Non-Industrial Occupations) Convention, 1946 code
- K&R C (Kernighan and Ritchie C), C programming language standard released in 1978, sometimes called C78, the original widespread version of C
- Caldwell 78 (NGC 6541), a globular cluster in the constellation Corona Australis
- C-78 Bobcat, a 1954 military aircraft
- HMAS Kanimbla (C78), WWII Australian armed merchant cruiser
- ARM Zamora (C78), Mexican Navy ship, an Auk-class minesweeper originating in WWII
- Mauser C78 "zig-zag", single-action revolver handgun
- 78th edition of Comiket

== See also ==
- 78 (disambiguation)
- c (disambiguation)
