= Ajay Ahuja =

Indian fighter pilot killed during the Kargil War

Squadron Leader Ajay Ahuja VrC
- Born: 22 May 1963; Kota, Rajasthan, India
- Died: 27 May 1999 (aged 36); Kargil, Jammu and Kashmir (now Ladakh)
- Spouse: Alka Ahuja
- Children: 1
- Military career
- Allegiance: India
- Branch: Indian Air Force
- Service years: 1985–1999
- Rank: Squadron Leader
- Nickname: AJ
- Unit: No. 17 Squadron (Golden Arrows)
- Awards: Vir Chakra

Squadron Leader Ajay Ahuja VrC (22 May 1963 – 27 May 1999) was a fighter pilot of the Indian Air Force who was killed in action during the Kargil War between India and Pakistan in 1999. His MiG-21 was hit by a Pakistani shoulder-fired FIM-92 Stinger near the town of Kargil in the Indian territory of Jammu and Kashmir. Ahuja ejected from the aircraft and parachuted onto the ground. Upon landing, he was captured and tortured by the Pakistani Army and later killed by 2 gunshot wounds. A post-mortem report conducted on Ahuja's body after it was recovered and returned to India confirmed that he had a fractured knee alongside two fatal bullet wounds to his head and chest.

Reports by the Indian media of Ahuja's capture and killing by Pakistani troops during the conflict sparked a major uproar within India, as is often seen in the case of rising tensions with Pakistan.

== Early life and military career ==
Ajay was born on 22 May 1963 in Kota, Rajasthan, India. He attended Saint Paul's Senior Secondary School, a renowned missionary school for boys. He graduated from the National Defence Academy and was commissioned as a fighter pilot in the Indian Air Force on 14 June 1985. Ahuja was promoted to the rank of squadron leader on 14 June 1996.

As a fighter pilot, he flew on MiG-21 and MiG-23 fighter aircraft, and gained instructional flying experience of over 1,000 hours that was spent teaching ab-initio pilots. In 1997, Ahuja was posted to the Bhisiana Air Force Station in Bhatinda, Punjab. Shortly after his assignment to the role of flight commander with the No. 17 Squadron, the Kargil War had broken out between India and Pakistan in 1999.

== Kargil War and shoot-down by Pakistani forces ==
On 27 May 1999, as part of Operation Safed Sagar during Kargil War, Squadron leader Ahuja was undertaking a photo reconnaissance mission. While another member of the mission package, Flight Lieutenant Nachiketa ejected from his MiG-27L after an engine flame out. Squadron leader Ahuja stayed over enemy positions to help the rescue attempts knowing full well the existence of enemy surface-to-air missiles in the area. However, his MiG-21MF fighter, C-1539, was hit by a Pakistani shoulder-fired FIM-92 Stinger. Ahuja gave a radio call – "Hercules, something has hit my plane, possibility of missile hit cannot be ruled out, I am ejecting over...(location).". IAF authorities lost track of his aircraft and all communication shortly afterward.

== Circumstances of death ==
According to the data released by the Indian Air Force, Ahuja's aircraft had crossed the Line of Control into the Pakistani area. He was captured and killed by Pakistan Army personnel after he landed. After his body was recovered, a post-mortem examination was conducted. The report revealed two fatal bullet wounds and a fractured knee, the latter likely sustained during landing after ejection, indicating that he was alive upon landing. However, this incident was strictly rejected by Pakistan. Squadron leader Ahuja's body would be recovered by the men of the 10th Battalion of the Garhwal Rifles.

== Return and cremation ==
On 29 May 1999, Ahuja's body was flown to a local Air Force station by the Indian Air Force. Angry public demonstrations broke out there, at his cremation, and near the High Commission of Pakistan in Delhi.

== Reaction and aftermath ==
On 15 June 1999, Deputy High Commissioner of the Pakistani High Commission in New Delhi was summoned and a notice for the breach of Geneva conventions was submitted for the torture and killing of the prisoners of War during the Kargil War. The Government of India also lodged a protest with Pakistan's High Commissioner, accusing the Pakistani forces of having fired at Ahuja while still descending in his parachute. Pakistani authorities denied the accusations and suggested that Ahuja had died due to accidental injuries during the ejection or landing.

== Commemoration ==
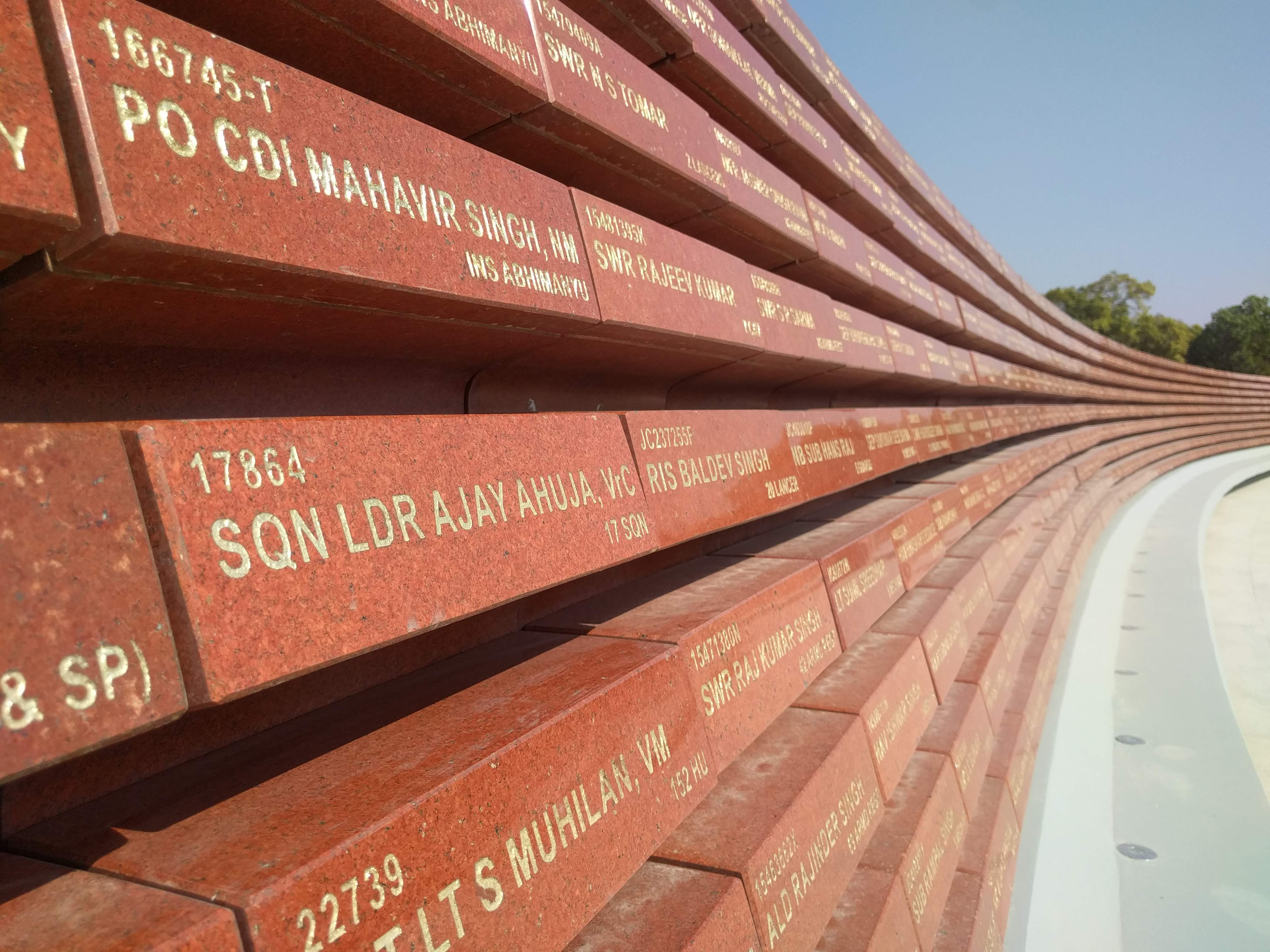
Squadron Leader Ajay Ahuja's name on the Tyag Chakra (Circle of Sacrifice), National War Memorial, India.

Ahuja remains a great hero for Indians, and his widow and family are often honored guests at patriotic public events and official ceremonies. The family received much support from Government authorities and Indian political leaders, as well as emotional and financial support from people across India. A statue of Ahuja was constructed by the Bhatinda-Muktsar road.

On 15 August 1999, India's 52nd anniversary of Independence, Squadron Leader Ajay Ahuja was awarded the Vir Chakra shortly after his death, which is one of India's highest gallantry honours for military personnel.

== In popular culture ==
Siddharth played the role of Squadron Leader Ajay Ahuja in a Hindi military drama series Operation Safed Sagar which revolves around the Indian Air Force's high-altitude aerial Operation Safed Sagar during the 1999 Kargil War.

== See also ==
- Kargil War
- Military of India
