= 78th Regiment of Foot (disambiguation) =

78th Regiment of Foot may refer to:

- 78th Regiment of Foot, or Lord Herbert's Regiment 1745 - 1746
- 78th Fraser Highlanders - properly the 78th (Highland) Regiment of Foot, also "Fraser's Highlanders" 1758 - 1763
- 78th (Highland) Regiment of Foot, or Seaforth (Highland) Regiment - 1778 - 1786 thereafter renumbered as the 72nd Regiment of Foot
- 78th (Highlanders) Regiment of Foot or "The Ross-shire Buffs" 1793 - 1881

== See also ==
- 78th Regiment (disambiguation)
