= '78 =

'78 may refer to:

- 1978
- '78, album by China Forbes, which features a track by the same name

== See also ==
- 78 (disambiguation)
