= Surinder Singh (brigadier) =

- Born: 1947 (age 78–79)
- Military career
- Allegiance: India
- Branch: India Army
- Service years: 15 March 1970–1999
- Rank: Brigadier
- Unit: Mahar Regiment
- Commands: 121 (I) Infantry Brigade; 5 Mahar
- Conflicts: UNOSOM II; Kargil war

Surinder Singh SM, VSM is a retired Indian Army officer who commanded the 121 (Independent) Infantry brigade during the Kargil War and was dismissed from the army following the war by the Chief of Army Staff (COAS) VP Malik.

== Overview ==
=== Early career ===
Singh was commissioned into the 10th Battalion of the Mahar Regiment on 15 March 1970 as a Second lieutenant. His battalion participated in India–Pakistan war of 1971 on the Eastern front. After the war, he served in Counterinsurgency operations in Nagaland as a captain for which he was decorated with the Sena Medal. Later when 10 Mahar was transferred to Northern Command, Major Singh came to command a company in the Kaksar region of Kargil. In 1981, during skirmishes between Indian and Pakistani forces in Kashmir, he captured Point 5108 back from Pakistan.

After assuming command of the 5th Battalion of the Mahar Regiment, Colonel Singh was sent to Somalia as a part of the UNOSOM II. For his service in Somalia, he was decorated with Vishisht Seva Medal.

=== Kargil war ===
In June 1998, Col Singh was promoted to the rank of Brigadier and given the command of 121 (Independent) Infantry brigade which was a brigade under the 3 Infantry Division commanded by Maj Gen V.S. Budhwar. This unit held the responsibility of guarding the Kargil sector of the Northern Command and thus came to be known as the Kargil brigade. In early May 1999, reports of infiltration in the sector reached the brigade and patrol units of different battalions were sent to apprise the vacated Indian posts along the border with Pakistan. These units came under heavy resistance from infiltrators. One such unit from the 4 Jat battalion was attacked, Capt. Saurabh Kalia was taken prisoner and was tortured and killed. Soon after the initial reports, the brigade came under artillery fire from the Pakistani side.

By 21 May, units of the brigade encountered heavy intrusions and following the induction of other units for the defense of Kargil, his headquarters were moved to Kaksar. The Chief of the Indian Army during the war, Gen Ved Prakash Malik writes in his book that due to the lack of progress on the Kaksar sector by 10 June, Brig Singh was removed as the commander of 121 brigade and was replaced with Brig. O.P. Nandrajog.
