= Kargil War =

1999 conflict between India and Pakistan

- Part of India-Pakistan wars and the Kashmir conflict
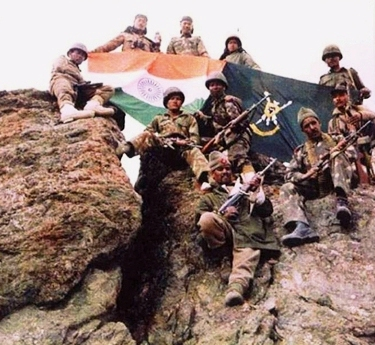
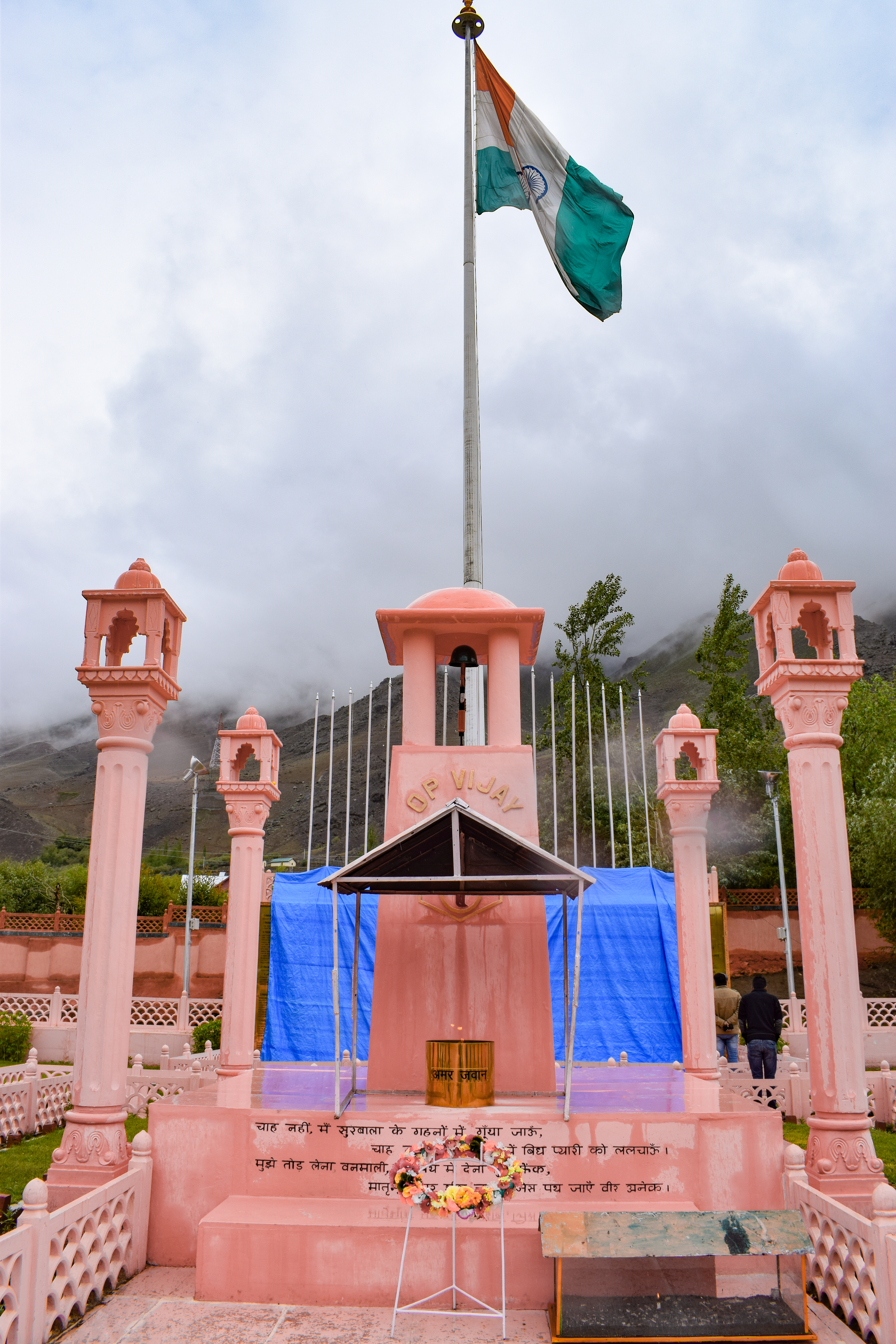
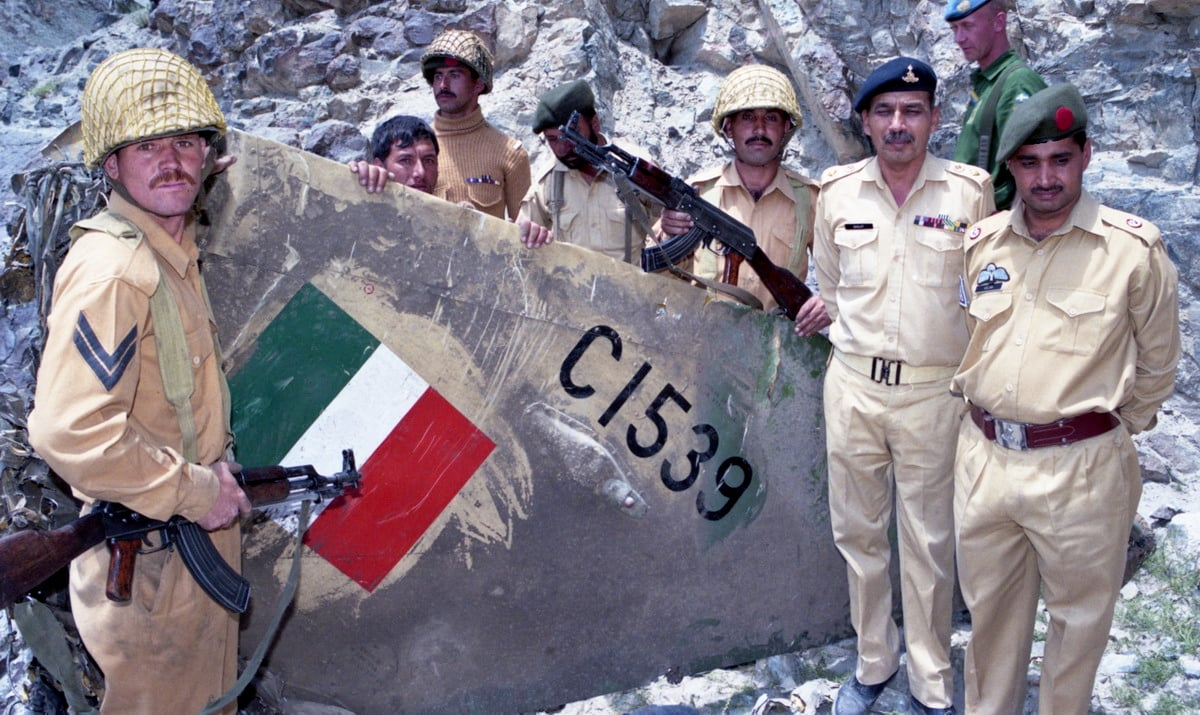
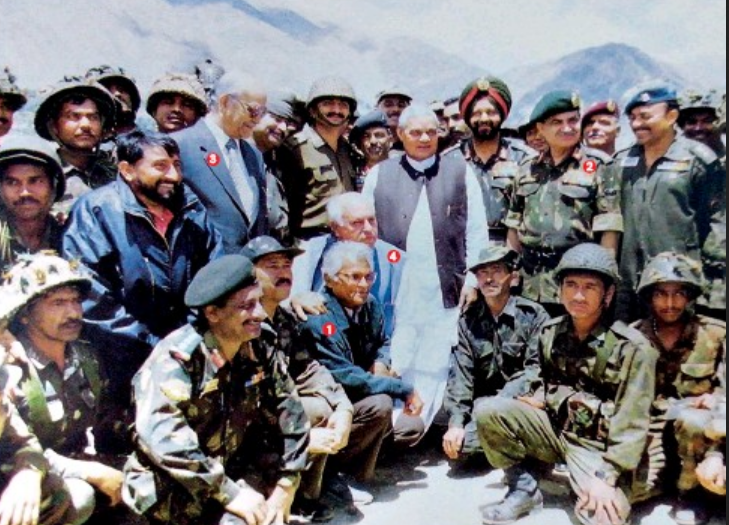
- Indian soldiers after capturing a hill from Pakistani forces Kargil War Memorial, Drass Pakistani soldiers with a shot-down Indian MiG-21 Indian soldiers with Prime Minister Atal Bihari Vajpayee in Kargil following Indian victory
Date	3 May – 26 July 1999 (2 months, 3 weeks and 2 days)
Location	Kargil district, Jammu and Kashmir, (now Ladakh, India)
Result	Indian victory: India regains possession of Kargil
Territorial changes	Status quo ante bellum

Belligerents
India	Pakistan; United Jihad Council

Commanders and leaders
Atal Bihari Vajpayee; V.P. Malik; Yashwant Tipnis; Nirmal Vij; Krishnan Pal; Mohinder Puri; O. P. Nandrajog	Nawaz Sharif; Pervez Musharraf; Aziz Khan; Ashraf Rashid; Mahmud Ahmed

Units involved
- See order of battle

Strength
30,000	5,000

Casualties and losses
Indian figures: 527 killed; 1,363 wounded; 1 POW; 1 MiG-27 shot down; 1 MiG-21 shot down; 1 Mil Mi-17 shot down; Pakistani claims: 1,600 (per Musharraf)	U.S. estimate figures: ~700 killed; Pakistani figures: 453 killed; 665+ wounded; 8 POWs; Other Pakistani figures: 4,000 killed (per Nawaz Sharif); 3,000 killed (PML(N) white paper); 357 killed (per Musharraf); Indian claims: 737–1,200 killed (at least 249 bodies recovered in Indian territory)

The Kargil War, also known as the Kargil conflict, was fought between India and Pakistan from May to July 1999 in the Kargil district of Ladakh, then part of the Indian-administered state of Jammu and Kashmir and along the Line of Control (LoC). In India, the conflict is also referred to as Operation Vijay (lit. 'Victory'), which was the codename of the Indian military operation in the region. The Indian Air Force acted jointly with the Indian Army to flush out the Pakistan Army and paramilitary troops from vacated Indian positions along the LoC, in what was designated as Operation Safed Sagar (lit. 'White Sea').

The conflict was triggered by the infiltration of Pakistani troops—disguised as Kashmiri militants—into strategic positions on the Indian side of the LoC, which serves as the de facto border between the two countries in the disputed region of Kashmir. During its initial stages, Pakistan blamed the fighting entirely on independent Kashmiri insurgents, but documents left behind by casualties and later statements by Pakistan's Prime Minister and Chief of Army Staff showed the involvement of Pakistani paramilitary forces, led by General Ashraf Rashid. The Indian Army, later supported by the Indian Air Force, recaptured a majority of the positions on the Indian side of the LoC; facing international diplomatic opposition, Pakistani forces withdrew from all remaining Indian positions along the LoC.

The Kargil War is the most recent example of high-altitude warfare in mountainous terrain, and as such, posed significant logistical problems for the combatting sides. It also marks one of only two major instances of conventional warfare between nuclear-armed states (alongside the Sino-Soviet border conflict). India had conducted its first successful test in 1974; Pakistan, which was developing its nuclear capability in secret since around the same time, conducted its first known tests in 1998, just two weeks after a second series of tests by India.

== Location ==
Before the Partition of India in 1947, Kargil was a tehsil (subdistrict) of Ladakh, a sparsely populated region with diverse linguistic, ethnic, and religious groups, living in isolated valleys separated by some of the world's highest mountains. The Indo-Pakistani War of 1947-1948 concluded with the Line of Control bisecting Ladakh district, with Skardu tehsil going to Pakistan (now part of Gilgit-Baltistan). After Pakistan's defeat in the Indo-Pakistani War of 1971, the two nations signed the Simla Agreement promising not to engage in armed conflict with respect to that boundary.

The town of Kargil is located 205 km (127 mi) from Srinagar, facing the Northern Areas across the LOC. Like other areas in the Himalayas, Kargil has a continental climate. Summers are cool with frigid nights, while winters are long and chilly with temperatures often dropping to −48 °C (−54 °F).

An Indian national highway (NH 1) connecting Srinagar to Leh cuts through Kargil. The military outposts on the ridges above the highway were generally around 5,000 m (16,000 ft) high, with a few as high as 5,485 m (17,995 ft). The rough terrain and narrow roads slowed down traffic, and the high altitude, which affected the ability of aircraft to carry loads, made control of NH 1 (the actual stretch of the highway which was under Pakistani fire) a priority for India. From their 130+ covertly occupied observation posts, the occupants had a clear line-of-sight.

Kargil was targeted partly because the terrain was conducive to the preemptive seizure of several unoccupied military positions. With tactically vital features and well-prepared defensive posts atop the peaks, a defender on the high ground would enjoy advantages akin to that of a fortress. Any attack to dislodge a defender from high ground in mountain warfare requires a far higher ratio of attackers to defenders, and the difficulties would be exacerbated by the high altitude and freezing temperatures.

Kargil is just 173 km (107 mi) from the Pakistani-controlled town of Skardu, which was capable of providing logistical and artillery support to Pakistani combatants. A road between Kargil and Skardu exists, which was closed in 1949.

== Background ==
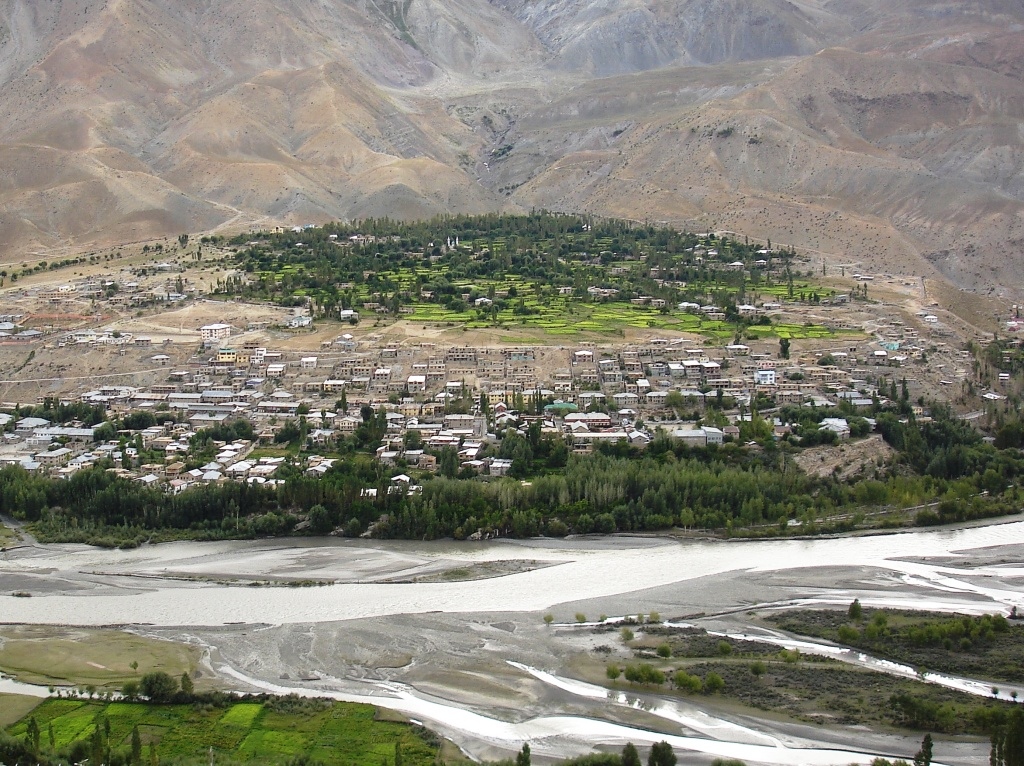
The town of Kargil is strategically located

After the Indo-Pakistani war of 1971, there was a long period with relatively few direct armed conflicts involving the military forces of the two neighbours—notwithstanding the efforts of both nations to control the Siachen Glacier by establishing military outposts on the surrounding mountains ridges and the resulting military skirmishes in the 1980s. During the 1990s, however, escalating tensions and conflict due to separatist activities in Kashmir, some of which were supported by Pakistan, as well as the conducting of nuclear tests by both countries in 1998, led to an increasingly belligerent atmosphere. In an attempt to defuse the situation, both countries signed the Lahore Declaration in February 1999, promising to provide a peaceful and bilateral solution to the Kashmir conflict.

During the winter of 1998–1999, some elements of the Pakistani Armed Forces were covertly training and sending Pakistani troops and paramilitary forces, some allegedly in the guise of mujahideen, into territory on the Indian side of the LOC. The infiltration was codenamed "Operation Badr"; its aim was to sever the link between Kashmir and Ladakh, and cause Indian forces to withdraw from the Siachen Glacier, thus forcing India to negotiate a settlement of the broader Kashmir dispute. Pakistan also believed any tension in the region would internationalise the Kashmir issue, helping it to secure a speedy resolution. Yet another goal may have been to boost the morale of the decade-long rebellion in Jammu and Kashmir by taking a proactive role.

Pakistani Lieutenant General Shahid Aziz, and then head of ISI analysis wing, has confirmed there were no mujahideen but only regular Pakistan Army soldiers who took part in the Kargil War. "There were no Mujahideen, only taped wireless messages, which fooled no one. Our soldiers were made to occupy barren ridges, with hand held weapons and ammunition", Lt Gen Aziz wrote in his article in The Nation daily in January 2013.

Some writers have speculated the operation's objective may also have been retaliation for India's Operation Meghdoot in 1984 that seized much of Siachen Glacier.

According to India's then army chief (COAS) Ved Prakash Malik, and many scholars, much of the background planning, including construction of logistical supply routes, was undertaken much earlier. On several occasions during the 1980s and 1990s, the army had given Pakistani leaders (Zia ul Haq and Benazir Bhutto) similar proposals for infiltration into the Kargil region, but these plans were shelved for fear of drawing the nations into all-out war.

Some analysts believe the blueprint of attack was reactivated soon after Pervez Musharraf was appointed chief of army staff in October 1998. After the war, Nawaz Sharif, Prime Minister of Pakistan during the Kargil conflict, claimed he was unaware of the plans and he first learned about the situation when he received an urgent phone call from Atal Bihari Vajpayee, his counterpart in India. Sharif attributed the plan to Musharraf and "just two or three of his cronies", a view shared by some Pakistani writers who have stated only four generals, including Musharraf, knew of the plan. Musharraf, however, asserted that Sharif was briefed on the Kargil operation 15 days ahead of Vajpayee's journey to Lahore on 20 February. Analysts highlighted Vajpayee’s leadership during the conflict as balancing military firmness with diplomatic restraint, contributing to India’s ability to maintain international support while defending its territorial integrity.

== Occupation by Pakistan ==
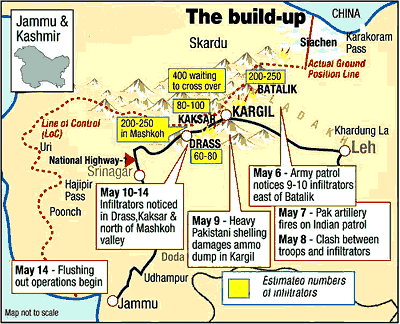
Infiltration and military build-up

During February 1999, the Pakistan Army sent forces to occupy some posts on the Indian side of the LOC. Troops from the elite Special Services Group as well as four to seven battalions of the Northern Light Infantry (a paramilitary regiment not part of the regular Pakistani army at that time) covertly and overtly set up bases on 132 vantage points of the Indian-controlled region. According to some reports, these Pakistani forces were backed by Kashmiri guerrillas and Afghan mercenaries. According to General Ved Malik, the bulk of the infiltration occurred in April.

Pakistani intrusions took place in the heights of the lower Mushkoh Valley, along the Marpo La ridgeline in Drass, in Kaksar near Kargil, in the Batalik sector east of the Indus River, on the heights above the Chorbat La sector where the LOC turns North and in the Turtuk sector south of the Siachen area.

== Discovery of infiltration and mobilisation ==
Initially, these incursions were not detected for a number of reasons: Indian patrols were not sent into some of the areas infiltrated by the Pakistani forces and heavy artillery fire by Pakistan in some areas provided cover for the infiltrators. But by the second week of May, the ambush of an Indian patrol team led by Captain Saurabh Kalia, who acted on a tip-off by a local shepherd in the Batalik sector, led to the exposure of the infiltration. Initially, with little knowledge of the nature or extent of the infiltration, the Indian troops in the area assumed the infiltrators were jihadis and claimed they would evict them within a few days. At the time of the discovery of these attacks, the COAS of the Indian Army Gen V. P. Malik was on a visit to Poland and was receiving information regarding the discoveries. On 12 May, the estimate reported by the DGMO to Gen Malik was "some militants" but by 15 May, the estimate had risen to 250-300. 8 Mountain Division under the command of Maj. Gen. Mohinder Puri was mobilised to be ready for engagement. The estimate grew to over 1000 by 21 May.

The true scale of the incursions was only recognised by the high command after the CCS meeting on 18 May after which heavy mobilisation began and division level movement was ordered. Several divisions were ordered to halt counterinsurgency activities and position to engage the infiltrators. The total area seized by the ingress is generally accepted to between 130 and 200 km^{2} (50 and 80 sq mi).

The clear line of sight provided by the ridges was a serious problem for the Indian Army as the highway was the main logistical and supply route. The Pakistani shelling of the arterial road threatened to cut Leh off, though an alternative (and longer) road to Leh existed via Himachal Pradesh, the Leh–Manali Highway.

The infiltrators, apart from being equipped with small arms and grenade launchers, were also armed with mortars, artillery and anti-aircraft guns. Many posts were also heavily mined, with India later stating it recovered more than 8,000 anti-personnel mines, according to an ICBL report. Pakistan's reconnaissance was done through unmanned aerial vehicles and AN/TPQ-36 Firefinder radars supplied by the US.

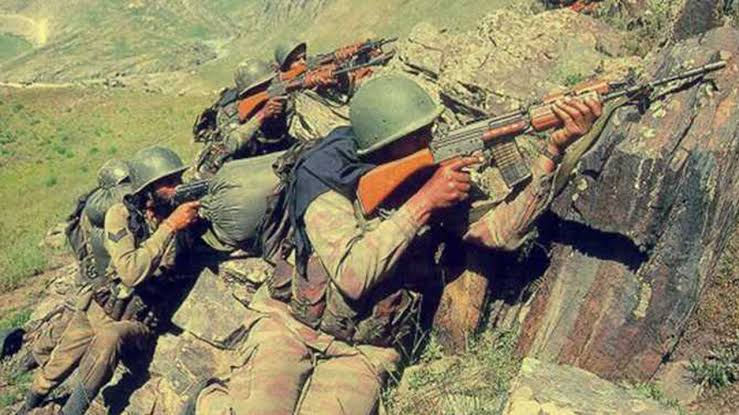
Indian forces in combat during Operation VIjay

The Government of India responded with Operation Vijay, a mobilisation of 200,000 Indian troops. However, because of the nature of the terrain, division and corps operations could not be mounted; subsequent fighting was conducted mostly at the brigade or battalion level. In effect, two divisions of the Indian Army, numbering 20,000, plus several thousand from the Paramilitary forces of India and the air force were deployed in the conflict zone. The total number of Indian soldiers involved in the military operation in the Kargil-Drass sector was thus close to 30,000. The number of infiltrators, including those providing logistical backup, has been put at approximately 5,000 at the height of the conflict.

The Indian Air Force launched Operation Safed Sagar in support of the mobilisation of Indian land forces on 26 May. The Indian government cleared limited use of Air Power only on 25 May, for fear of undesirable escalation, with the fiat that IAF fighter jets were not to cross the LOC under any circumstance. This was the first time any air war was fought at such high altitudes globally, with targets at altitudes between 1,800 to 5,500 metres (6,000 to 18,000 ft) above sea level. The rarified air at these altitudes affected the ballistic trajectories of air to ground weapons such as rockets, as well as dumb and laser guided bombs. There was no opposition at all by the Pakistani Air Force, leaving the IAF free to carry out its attacks with impunity. The total air dominance of the IAF gave the aircrew enough time to modify aiming indices and firing techniques, increasing its effectiveness during the high altitude war. Poor weather conditions and range limitations intermittently affected bomb loads and the number of airstrips that could be used, except for the Mirage 2000 fleet, which commenced operations on 30 May.

=== Naval action ===
The Indian Navy also prepared to blockade Pakistani ports, primarily Karachi port, to cut off supply routes under Operation Talwar. The operation's goal was to choke Pakistani trade channels and damage its oil imports. The mission started when the frigate INS Taragiri and the missile corvettes INS Veer and INS Nirghat were first deployed near the Dwaraka coast, along with Dornier 228 maritime patrol aircraft. The Indian Navy's western and eastern fleets joined in the North Arabian Sea on 25th May and began aggressive patrols. Rajput and Delhi class Destroyers were deployed near Saurashtra. By 30th June, Indian amphibious warfare ships were also deployed, when they intercepted a North Korean merchantman carrying weapons to Pakistan. This exploited Pakistan's dependence on sea-based oil and trade flows. The Indian flotilla also conducted naval drills in the Arabian Sea. The Western fleet moved into strike positions and the submarine fleet of the Indian Navy was deployed around Karachi. Later, then–Prime Minister of Pakistan Nawaz Sharif disclosed Pakistan was left with just six days of fuel to sustain itself if a full-scale war had broken out.

== Overview ==
=== Mushkoh valley sector ===
The task of repelling the Pakistani forces was given to the 15th Corps under the command of Lt. Gen. Kishan Pal. The Kargil area, before the commencement of the engagement, was primarily enforced by 121 (I) infantry Brigade commanded by Brig. Surinder Singh, but Brig. Singh was dismissed from his position when the infiltration was discovered. In his place, Brig. O. P. Nandrajog took command of the brigade. 56 Mountain Brigade under the command of Brig. A. N. Aul of the 8 Mountain Division was also inducted into the area.

==== Battle of Tololing ====
The Indian Army's first priority was to recapture peaks that were in the immediate vicinity of NH 1. This resulted in Indian troops first targeting the Tiger Hill and Tololing complex in Dras, which dominated the Srinagar-Leh route. The Battle of Tololing, amongst other assaults, slowly tilted the combat in India's favour. By 22 May, 18 Grenadiers, 1 Naga and Garhwal Regiments under the command of Col Kushal Thakur had begun an assault on Tololing and were awaiting reinforcements. The battle lasted till 14 June. Along with reinforcements from 2 Rajputana Rifles under Lt Col M. B. Ravindranath and 16 Grenadiers, the Indian forces had to carry out several assaults in difficult terrain. Several senior Indian army officers were killed in action but Tololing peak and surrounding points like Point 4590 were captured. The recapture of Point 4590 on Tololing by Indian troops on 14 June was significant, notwithstanding the fact that it resulted in the Indian Army suffering the most casualties in a single battle during the conflict.

==== Operation Safed Sagar ====
The Indian Air Force was tasked to act jointly with ground troops on 25 May. The code name assigned to their role was Operation Safed Sagar. It was in this type of terrain that aerial attacks were used, initially with limited effectiveness. On 27 May, the IAF lost a MiG-27 aircraft piloted by Flt. Lt. K Nachiketa, which it attributed to an engine failure, and a MiG-21 fighter piloted by Sqn Ldr Ajay Ahuja which was shot down by the Pakistani army, both over the Batalik sector. Initially Pakistan said it shot down both jets after they crossed into its territory. According to reports, Ahuja had bailed out of his stricken plane safely but was apparently killed by his captors as his body was returned riddled with bullet wounds. One Indian Mi-8 helicopter was also lost due to Stinger SAMs. French made Mirage 2000H of the IAF were tasked to drop laser-guided bombs to destroy well-entrenched positions of the Pakistani forces and flew its first sortie on 30 May. The effects of the pinpoint non-stop bombing by the Mirage-2000, at day and night, became evident with almost immediate effect.

By 15 June, India had mobilised a huge portion of its army near the international border and Indian commanders were on order to be ready for crossing the International border. The Pakistani DGMO Tauqir Zia communicated to the Indian DGMO Nirmal Chander Vij that Pakistan was uncomfortable with the escalations. According to then COAS of India VP Malik, Pakistan did not want to escalate further.

==== Capture of point 5140 ====
On 17 June, 13 J&K Rifles was tasked with capturing points 5140. Under the command of Lt Col YK Joshi, the battalion carried the operation out on 20 June and successfully captured the point after an intense close-quarters battle. Gen Malik called Lt Vikram Batra's for his contribution to the battle, and his success signal - "Yeh Dil mange More" became legendary. Areas adjacent to point 5140, namely Rocky Knob and Black Tooth, were captured by 1 Naga by 22 June.

The infiltrators evicted from 5140 and Tololing had regrouped at point 4700 and 18 Grenadiers were tasked with removing them. This attack was successfully carried out from 28 to 30 June. This attack enabled the Indian forces to finally focus on point 5100 and Area three pimples.

==== Capture of Three Pimples ====
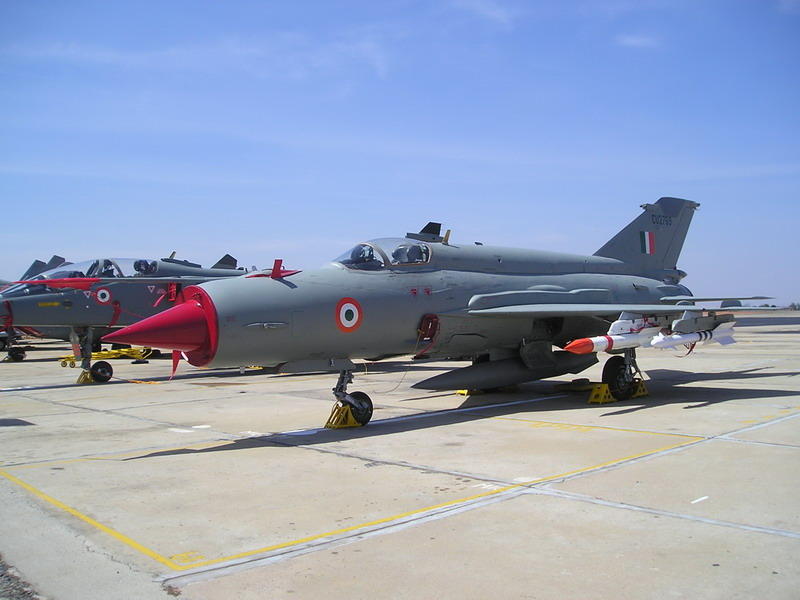
IAF MiG-21s were used extensively in the Kargil War

As the operation was fully underway, about 250 artillery guns were brought in to clear the infiltrators in the posts that were in the line-of-sight. The Bofors FH-77B field howitzer played a vital role, with Indian gunners making maximum use of the terrain. However, its success was limited elsewhere due to the lack of space and depth to deploy it.

Area three pimples consisted of the Knoll, Lone Hill and Three Pimples. 2 Rajputana Rifles of Lt. Col. Ravindranath was tasked to recapture it on 28 June. Gen Malik personally talked with Ravindranath before the battle. The battle began 2 hours later and lasted for 2 days. Area three pimples was captured on 29 June.

==== Battle of Tiger Hill ====
By the last week of June, most Pakistani fire power was concentrated to the highest peak in the surrounding, Tiger Hill. The 18 Grenadiers were placed under 192 Mountain Brigade commanded by Brig. MPS Bajwa and 41 Field Regiment was given the primary responsibility of artillery operations. The air force also concentrated its strikes on Tiger hill. This was the first battle in India to be telecasted live. The Battle of Tiger Hill began on 3 July. After 2 days of intense warfare, it was deemed impossible to just conclude the attack with one battalion so 8 Sikh was ordered to move from the west into Tiger Hill. By 5 July, several objectives were completed and major Pakistani commanders were killed. By 8 July the entire Tiger Hill feature was captured by 18 Grenadiers and 8 Sikh and Gen VP Malik addressed the media informing the world.

Two months into the conflict, Indian troops had slowly retaken most of the ridges encroached upon by the infiltrators; according to the official count, an estimated 75–80% of the intruded area and nearly all the high ground were back under Indian control.

==== Battle of point 4875 ====
After the battle of Tiger Hill, the next important objective was to capture point 4875 North-West of Mashkoh. The 13 JnK Rifles was assigned to 79 Mountain brigade of Brig. Ramesh Kakar. Lt. Col. Joshi regrouped in Mashkoh Valley on 1 July and the Battle began on 4 July. After hours of intense battle, Lt. Col. Joshi was unable to capture the point due to the fortification disadvantage and two companies of the battalion found themselves stuck in daylight.

An injured Lt. Vikram Batra volunteered to reinforce the companies and was deployed as a platoon commander. Throughout the night 5 July, the battle raged in close-quatres. "The opposing troops were so close that, besides the staccato of small arms, verbal exchanges carried on throughout the night", noted Gen. Malik. While assaulting the peak, Capt. Naveen Nagappa was injured. It then became clear the point directly north of 4875 also had to be captured. Capt. Batra led the final assault on this point, rescuing Capt. Nagappa but himself succumbed to Sniper and RPG fire on 7 July. Capt Batra's attack ensured an Indian victory at point 4875.

==== First Ceasefire ====
Between 4 and 12 July, 17 Jat and 2 Naga continued to attack peaks adjacent to Point 4875 and had success. 6 and 7 Para SF attacked point 4700 but had to suspend their operations on 12 July when the ceasefire came into effect. After the Pakistani forces failed to honour the ceasefire and withdraw forces, the Indian forces resumed operations and Point 4700 was captured by Para SF.

==== Battle of Zulu Spur ====
After the Pakistani forces refused to withdraw, Indian forces under the command of Brig. MPS Bajwa of 192 Mountain Brigade launched an attack on the Zulu Spur on 22 July. The 3 Gurkha Rifles and 9 Para SF carried out the operation and forced the Pakistani forces to retreat by 25 July.

=== Operations in Batalik sector ===
==== Battle of point 5203 ====
On 29 May, operations in Batalik sector began as 1 Bihar Regiment from 70 Infantry Brigade captured several posts, including Point 5203 in the western portion of the frontier, but had to eventually retreat. The forces then had to focus on the eastern side. Operations resumed on 1 June when 12 JnK Rifles and 5 Para SF attacked and captured Point 5390 and then decided to attack 5203 again. The assault was launched on 6 June. It resulted in an intense battle with heavy casualties. The battled continued till 21 June, when the Ladakh Scouts had to join the Indian side and the point was captured. The brigade commander Brig. Devinder Singh was also injured in this assault.

==== Battle of point 4812 ====
The next most important objective was to capture Point 4812, which was an important dominating position of Pakistani forces. Four battalions of the 70 Infantry Brigade were tasked with a multidirectional attack on 30 June. By 6 July, all these forces achieved their individual objectives and linked up.

==== Battle of Jubar ====
The final objective in the Batalik frontier was Jubar Peak which was isolated from the neighbouring dominating structures. The attack was launched by 1 Bihar on 29 June and with the assistance of air force and artillery, the peak was captured on 7 July.

=== Final ceasefire ===
On 27 July, Pakistani forces requested for a flag meeting and sought permission to collect dead bodies. Maj. Gen. Mohinder Puri granted this request. At the end of this venture, the Pakistani forces stood down and agreed to abide by the terms of the ceasefire in full.

=== Washington Accord and final battles ===
Following the outbreak of armed fighting, Pakistan sought American help in de-escalating the conflict. Bruce Riedel, who was then an aide to President Bill Clinton, reported that US intelligence had imaged Pakistani movements of nuclear weapons to forward deployments for fear of the Kargil hostilities escalating into a wider conflict. However, President Clinton refused to intervene until Pakistan removed all forces from the Indian side of the LOC.

Following the Washington accord of 4 July 1999, when Sharif agreed to withdraw Pakistani troops, most of the fighting came to a gradual halt, but some Pakistani forces remained in positions on the Indian side of the LoC. In addition, the United Jihad Council, an umbrella organisation of pro-Pakistani Kashmiri separatists, rejected Pakistan's plan for a climb-down, instead deciding to fight on.

The Indian army launched its final attacks in the last week of July in co-ordination with relentless attacks by the IAF, both by day and night, as part of their successful Operation Safed Sagar; as soon as the Drass subsector was cleared of Pakistani forces, the fighting ceased on 26 July. The day has since been marked as Kargil Vijay Diwas (Kargil Victory Day) in India. In the wake of its successive military defeats in Kargil, diplomatic isolation in the international arena, its precarious economic situation, and the mounting international pressure, the Pakistani establishment was compelled to negotiate a face saving withdrawal from the residual areas on the Indian side of the LoC, thereby restoring the sanctity of the LoC, as established in July 1972 in the Simla Agreement.

== Timeline of events ==
Date (1999)	Event
3 May	A Pakistani intrusion in the Kargil district is reported by local shepherds.
5 May	Indian Army patrols are sent out in response to earlier reports; 5 Indian soldiers are captured and subsequently killed.
9 May	Heavy shelling by the Pakistan Army damages Indian ammunition dumps in Kargil.
10 May	Multiple infiltrations across the LoC are confirmed in Dras, Kaksar, and Mushkoh sectors.
18 May	Heavy mobilisation and troop movement ordered after 18 May CCS meeting.
22 May	Indian forces attack Tololing.
24 May	CCS meeting on 24 May approves use of Air Force.
26 May	The Indian Air Force (IAF) begins airstrikes against suspected infiltrator positions.
27 May	One IAF MiG-21 and one MiG-27 aircraft are shot down by Anza surface-to-air missiles of the Pakistan Army's Air Defence Corps; Flt. Lt. Kambampati Nachiketa (pilot of the MiG-27) is captured by a Pakistani patrol and given POW status (released on 3 June 1999).
28 May	One IAF Mi-17 is shot down by Pakistani forces; four crew members are killed.
1 June	The Pakistan Army begins shelling operations on India's National Highway 1 in Kashmir and Ladakh.
5 June	India releases documents recovered from three Pakistani soldiers that officially indicate Pakistan's involvement in the conflict.
9 June	Indian troops re-capture two key positions in the Batalik sector.
11 June	India releases intercepts of conversations between Pakistani COAS Gen. Pervez Musharraf (on a visit to China) CGS Lt. Gen. Aziz Khan (in Rawalpindi) as proof of the Pakistan Army's involvement in the infiltrations.
13 June	Tololing is captured by India.
15 June	United States President Bill Clinton forces then-Prime Minister of Pakistan, Nawaz Sharif to immediately pull all Pakistani troops and irregulars out from Kargil.
20 June	Point 5140 is captured by India.
3 July	Indian forces surround Tiger Hill.
5 July	Nawaz Sharif officially announces the Pakistan Army's withdrawal from Kargil following a meeting with President Clinton. Indian forces subsequently take control of Dras.
7 July	Indian troops recapture Jubar Heights in Batalik. Tiger Hill is captured by India.
11 July	India retakes key peak points in Batalik.
12 July	Pakistani agrees to stand down but fails to withdraw troops. India resumes operations.
14 July	Prime Minister of India Atal Bihari Vajpayee declares Operation Vijay a success. The Indian government sets conditions for talks with Pakistan.
26 July	The Kargil War officially comes to an end. The Indian Army announces the complete withdrawal of Pakistani irregular and regular forces.

== World opinion ==
Pakistan was heavily criticised by other countries for instigating the war, as its paramilitary forces and insurgents had crossed the LOC (Line of Control). Pakistan's primary diplomatic response, one of plausible deniability linking the incursion to what it officially termed as "Kashmiri freedom fighters", was in the end not successful. Veteran analysts argued the battle was fought at heights where only seasoned troops could survive, so poorly equipped "freedom fighters" would neither have the ability nor the wherewithal to seize land and defend it. Moreover, while the army had initially denied the involvement of its troops in the intrusion, two soldiers were awarded the Nishan-E-Haider (Pakistan's highest military honour). Another 90 soldiers were also given gallantry awards, most of them posthumously, confirming Pakistan's role in the episode. India also released taped phone conversations between the Army Chief and a senior Pakistani general where the latter is recorded saying: "the scruff of [the militants] necks is in our hands", although Pakistan dismissed it as a "total fabrication". Concurrently, Pakistan made several contradicting statements, confirming its role in Kargil, when it defended the incursions saying that the LOC itself was disputed. Pakistan also attempted to internationalise the Kashmir issue, by linking the crisis in Kargil to the larger Kashmir conflict, but such a diplomatic stance found few backers on the world stage.

As the Indian counter-attacks picked up momentum, Pakistani prime minister Nawaz Sharif flew to meet US President Bill Clinton on 4 July to obtain support from the United States. Clinton rebuked Sharif, however, and asked him to use his contacts to rein in the militants and withdraw Pakistani soldiers from Indian territory. Clinton would later reveal in his autobiography that "Sharif's moves were perplexing" since the Indian Prime Minister had travelled to Lahore to promote bilateral talks aimed at resolving the Kashmir problem and "by crossing the Line of Control, Pakistan had wrecked the [bilateral] talks". On the other hand, he applauded Indian restraint for not crossing the LOC and escalating the conflict into an all-out war.

G8 nations supported India and condemned the Pakistani violation of the LOC at the Cologne summit. The European Union also opposed Pakistan's violation of the LOC. China, a long-time ally of Pakistan, insisted on a pullout of forces to the pre-conflict positions along the LOC and settling border issues peacefully. Other organisations like the ASEAN Regional Forum too supported India's stand on the inviolability of the LOC.

Faced with growing international pressure, Sharif managed to pull back the remaining soldiers from Indian territory. The joint statement issued by Clinton and Sharif conveyed the need to respect the LOC and resume bilateral talks as the best forum to resolve all disputes.

== Gallantry awards ==
=== India ===
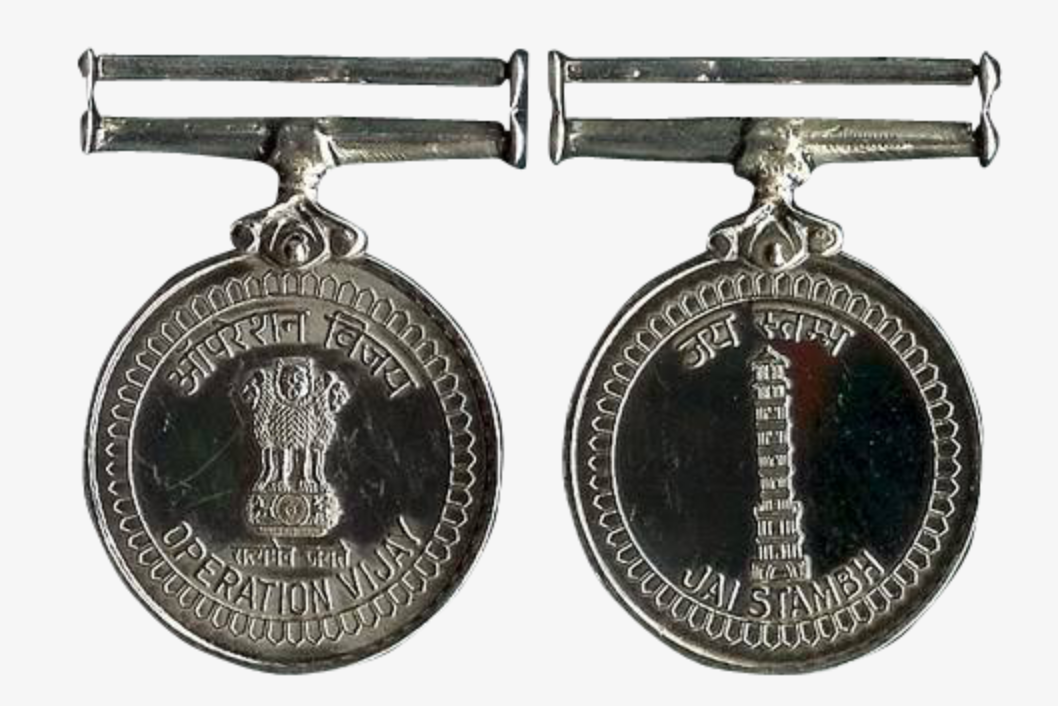
Operation Vijay Medal – Awarded to armed forces of India who were deployed during Operation Vijay

A number of Indian soldiers earned awards for gallantry. Four Param Vir Chakras and eleven Maha Vir Chakras were awarded.

Award	Rank	Name	Unit	References
Param Vir Chakra	Grenadier	Yogendra Singh Yadav	18 Grenadiers	
Param Vir Chakra	Lieutenant	Manoj Kumar Pandey	1/11 Gorkha Rifles	
Param Vir Chakra	Captain	Vikram Batra	13 Jammu and Kashmir Rifles	
Param Vir Chakra	Rifleman	Sanjay Kumar	13 Jammu and Kashmir Rifles	
Mahavir Chakra	Captain	Anuj Nayyar	17 Jat	
Mahavir Chakra	Major	Rajesh Singh Adhikari	18 Grenadiers	
Mahavir Chakra	Captain	Gurjinder Singh Suri	12 Bihar	
Mahavir Chakra	Naik	Digendra Kumar	2 Rajputana Rifles	
Mahavir Chakra	Lieutenant	Balwan Singh	18 Grenadiers	
Mahavir Chakra	Naik	Imliakum Ao	2 Naga	
Mahavir Chakra	Captain	Keishing Clifford Nongrum	12 Jammu and Kashmir Light Infantry	
Mahavir Chakra	Captain	Neikezhakuo Kenguruse	2 Rajputana Rifles	
Mahavir Chakra	Major	Padmapani Acharya	2 Rajputana Rifles	
Mahavir Chakra	Major	Sonam Wangchuk	Ladakh Scouts	
Mahavir Chakra	Major	Vivek Gupta	2 Rajputana Rifles	

The following units were awarded the COAS' unit citations for their exemplary role in the war:

- Infantry
  - 2 Rajputana Rifles
  - 8 Sikh
  - 17 Jat
  - 18 Grenadiers
  - 1 Bihar
  - 13 Jammu and Kashmir Rifles
  - 18 Garhwal Rifles
  - 12 Jammu and Kashmir Light Infantry
  - 2 Naga
  - 1/11 Gorkha Rifles
  - Ladakh Scouts
- Artillery
  - 108 Medium Regiment
  - 141 Field Regiment
  - 197 Field Regiment
- Army Aviation Corps
  - 663 (Reconnaissance and Observation) Squadron
  - 666 (Reconnaissance and Observation) Squadron
- Army Service Corps
  - 874 Animal Transport Battalion

=== Pakistan ===
Two Pakistani soldiers received the Nishan-e-Haider, Pakistan's highest military gallantry award:

- Capt. Karnal Sher Khan, 27th Battalion, Sind Regiment: Nishan-e-Haider (posthumous)
- Hav. Lalak Jan, Northern Light Infantry: Nishan-e-Haider (posthumous)

== Impact and influence of media ==
The Kargil War was significant for the impact and influence of the mass media on public opinion in both nations. Coming at a time of exploding growth in electronic journalism in India, Kargil news stories and war footage were often telecast live on TV, and many websites provided in-depth analysis of the war. The conflict became the first "live" war in South Asia and it was given such detailed media coverage that one effect was the drumming up of jingoistic feelings.

The conflict soon turned into a news propaganda war, in which press briefings given by government officials of each nation produced conflicting claims and counterclaims. The Indian government placed a temporary News Embargo on information from Pakistan, banning the telecast of the state-run Pakistani channel PTV, and blocking access to online editions of the Dawn newspaper. The Pakistani media criticised this apparent curbing of freedom of the press in India, while Indian media claimed it was in the interest of national security. The Indian government ran advertisements in foreign publications including The Times and The Washington Post detailing Pakistan's role in supporting extremists in Kashmir in an attempt to garner political support for its position.

As the war progressed, media coverage of the conflict was more intense in India than in Pakistan. Many Indian channels showed images from the battle zone in a style reminiscent of CNN's coverage of the Gulf War (one of the shells fired by Pakistan troops even hit a Doordarshan transmission centre in Kargil; coverage continued, however). Reasons for India's increased coverage included the greater number of privately owned electronic media in India compared to Pakistan and relatively greater transparency in the Indian media. At a seminar in Karachi, Pakistani journalists agreed that while the Indian government had taken the press and the people into its confidence, Pakistan had not.

The print media in India and abroad was largely sympathetic to the Indian cause, with editorials in newspapers based in the west and other neutral countries observing that Pakistan was largely responsible for the conflict. Some analysts believe the Indian media, which was both larger in number and more credible, may have acted as a force multiplier for the Indian military operation in Kargil and served as a morale booster. As the fighting intensified, the Pakistani version of events found little backing on the world stage. This helped India gain valuable diplomatic recognition for its position.

== WMDs and the nuclear factor ==
Since Pakistan and India each had weapons of mass destruction, many in the international community were concerned that if the Kargil conflict intensified, it could lead to nuclear war. Both countries had tested their nuclear capability in 1998, marking India's second nuclear test and Pakistan's first. Many political pundits believed the tests to be an indication of the escalating stakes in the scenario in South Asia. When the Kargil conflict started just a year after the nuclear tests, many nations desired to end it before it intensified.

International concerns increased when Pakistani foreign secretary Shamshad Ahmad made a statement on 31 May, warning that an escalation of the limited conflict could lead Pakistan to use "any weapon" in its arsenal. This was immediately interpreted as a threat of nuclear retaliation by Pakistan in the event of an extended war, and the belief was reinforced when the leader of Pakistan's senate noted, "The purpose of developing weapons becomes meaningless if they are not used when they are needed". Many such ambiguous statements from officials of both countries were viewed as warnings of an impending nuclear crisis where the combatants would consider use of their limited nuclear arsenals in "tactical" nuclear warfare in the belief that it would not have ended in mutual assured destruction, as could have occurred in a nuclear conflict between the United States and the USSR. Some experts believe that following nuclear tests in 1998, the Pakistani military was emboldened by its nuclear deterrent to markedly increase coercion against India.

The nature of the India-Pakistan conflict took a more sinister turn when the United States received intelligence of Pakistani nuclear warheads being moved towards the border. Bill Clinton tried to dissuade Pakistan prime minister Nawaz Sharif from nuclear brinkmanship, even threatening Pakistan of dire consequences. According to a White House official, Sharif seemed to be genuinely surprised by this supposed missile movement and responded that India was probably planning the same. In an article published in a defence journal in 2000, Sanjay Badri-Maharaj, a security expert, claimed while quoting another expert that India too had readied at least five nuclear-tipped ballistic missiles.

Sensing a deteriorating military scenario, diplomatic isolation, and the risks of a larger conventional and nuclear war, Sharif ordered the Pakistani army to vacate the Kargil heights. He later claimed in his official biography that General Pervez Musharraf had moved nuclear warheads without informing him. Recently however, Pervez Musharraf revealed in his memoirs that Pakistan's nuclear delivery system was not operational during the Kargil war; something that would have put Pakistan under serious disadvantage if the conflict went nuclear.

The threat of WMDs included chemical and even biological weapons. Pakistan accused India of using chemical weapons and incendiary weapons such as napalm against the Kashmiri fighters. India, on the other hand, showcased a cache of gas masks as proof that Pakistan may have been prepared to use non-conventional weapons. US officials and the Organisation for the Prohibition of Chemical Weapons determined Pakistani allegations of India using banned chemicals in its bombs were unfounded.

== Aftermath ==
=== India ===
From the end of the war until February 2000, the Indian stock market rose by more than 30%. The next Indian national budget included major increases in military spending.

There was a surge in patriotism, with many celebrities expressing their support for the Kargil cause. Indians were angered by media reports of the death of pilot Ajay Ahuja, especially after Indian authorities reported that Ahuja had been murdered and his body mutilated by Pakistani troops. The war had produced higher than expected fatalities for the Indian military, with a sizeable percentage of them including newly commissioned officers. One month after conclusion of the Kargil War, the Atlantique Incident, in which a Pakistan Navy plane was shot down by India, briefly reignited fears of a conflict between the two countries.

After the war, the Indian government severed ties with Pakistan and increased defence preparedness. India increased its defence budget as it sought to acquire more state of the art equipment. The media reported about military procurement irregularities, and also criticised intelligence agencies like the Research and Analysis Wing, which failed to predict the intrusions or the identity and number of infiltrators during the war. An internal assessment report by the armed forces, published in an Indian magazine, showed several other failings, including "a sense of complacency" and being "unprepared for a conventional war" on the presumption that nuclearism would sustain peace. It also highlighted the lapses in command and control, the insufficient troop levels and the dearth of large-calibre guns like the Bofors. In 2006, retired Air Chief Marshal A. Y. Tipnis alleged the Indian Army did not fully inform the government about the intrusions, adding that army chief Ved Prakash Malik was initially reluctant to use the full strike capability of the Indian Air Force, instead requesting only helicopter gunship support. Soon after the conflict, India also decided to complete the project, previously stalled by Pakistan, to fence the entire LOC.

The end of the Kargil conflict was followed by the 13th Indian General Elections to the Lok Sabha, which gave a decisive mandate to the National Democratic Alliance (NDA) government. It was re-elected to power in September–October 1999 with a majority of 303 seats out of 545 in the Lok Sabha. On the diplomatic front, Indo-US relations improved, as the United States appreciated Indian attempts to restrict the conflict to a limited geographic area. Relations with Israel—which had discreetly aided India with ordnance supply and materiel such as unmanned aerial vehicles, laser-guided bombs, and satellite imagery—were also bolstered.

The end and victory of the Kargil War is celebrated annually in India as Kargil Vijay Diwas.

=== Kargil Review Committee ===
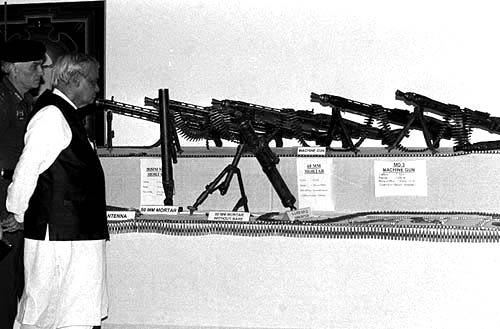
Prime Minister Vajpayee checking the guns captured from Pakistani intruders during the Kargil War

Soon after the war, the Atal Bihari Vajpayee government set up an inquiry into its causes and to analyse perceived Indian intelligence failures. The high-powered committee was chaired by eminent strategic affairs analyst K. Subrahmanyam and given powers to interview anyone with current or past associations with Indian security, including former Prime Ministers. The committee's final report, also referred to as the "Subrahmanyam Report", led to a large-scale restructuring of Indian Intelligence. It, however, came in for heavy criticism in the Indian media for its perceived avoidance of assigning specific responsibility for failures over detecting the Kargil intrusions. The committee was also embroiled in controversy for indicting Brig. Surinder Singh of the Indian Army for his failure to report enemy intrusions in time, and for his subsequent conduct. Many press reports questioned or contradicted this finding and claimed Singh had in fact issued early warnings that were ignored by senior Indian Army commanders and, ultimately, higher government functionaries.

In a departure from the norm the final report was published and made publicly available. Some chapters and all annexures, however, were deemed to contain classified information by the government and not released. K. Subrahmanyam later wrote that the annexures contained information on the development of India's nuclear weapons program and the roles played by Prime Ministers Rajiv Gandhi, P. V. Narasimha Rao and V. P. Singh.

=== Pakistan ===
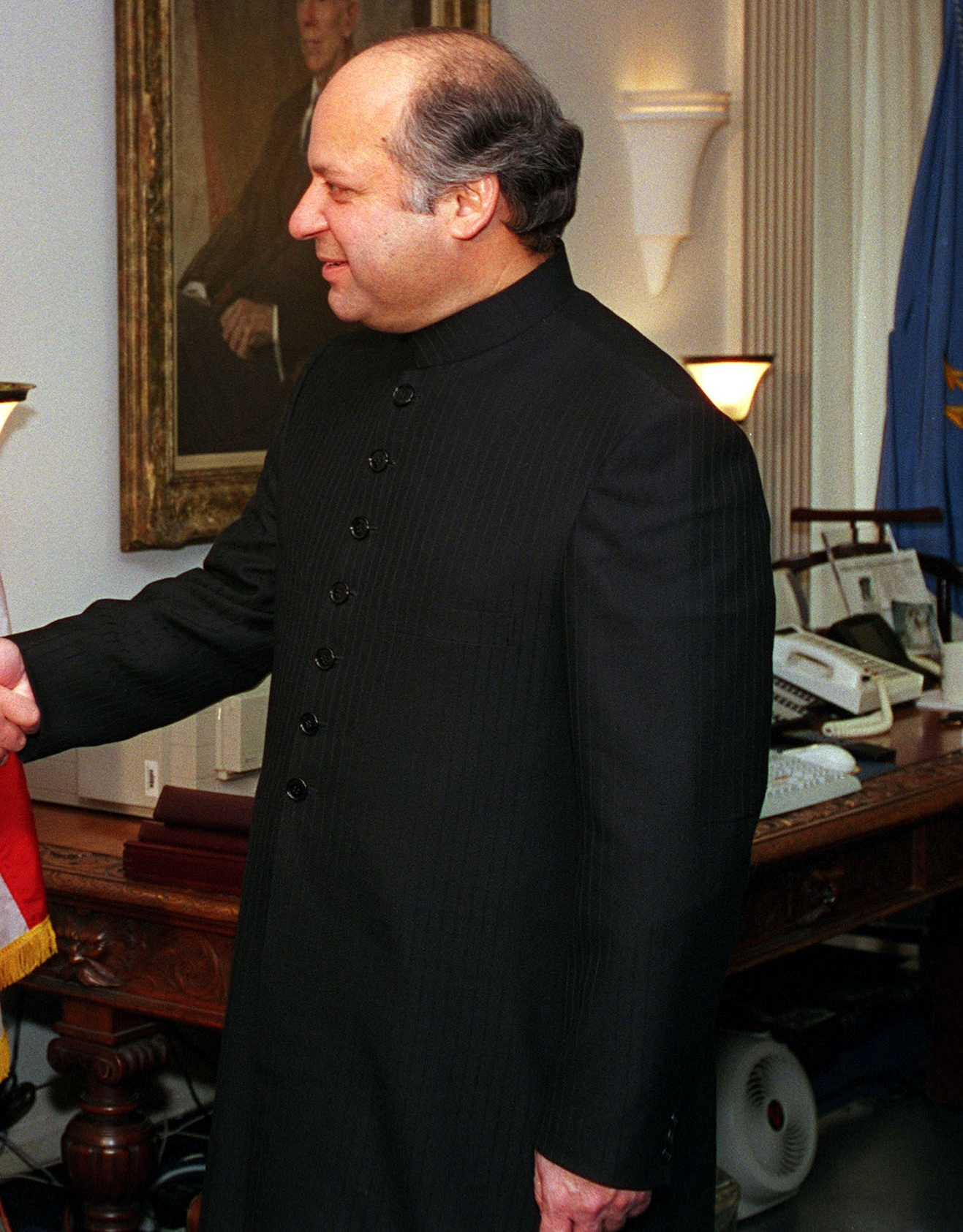
Nawaz Sharif, Prime minister at the time. After a few months a military coup d'état was initiated that ousted him and his government

Shortly after declaring itself a nuclear weapons state, Pakistan was humiliated diplomatically and militarily. Faced with the possibility of international isolation, the already fragile Pakistan economy was weakened further. The morale of Pakistan forces after the withdrawal declined as many units of the Northern Light Infantry suffered heavy casualties. Journalist Nasim Zehra claims the then FCNA commander "could not face his troops" after the withdrawal. Zehra further claimed instructions were given that lessons or courses on Kargil would not be taught at the National Defence College or any other institutions. The government refused to accept the dead bodies of many officers, an issue that provoked outrage and protests in the Northern Areas. Pakistan initially did not acknowledge many of its casualties, but Sharif later said over 4,000 Pakistani troops were killed in the operation. Responding to this, Pervez Musharraf said, "It hurts me when an ex-premier undermines his own forces", and claimed Indian casualties were more than that of Pakistan. The legacy of Kargil war still continues to be debated on Pakistan's news channels and television political correspondents, which Musharraf repeatedly appeared to justify.

Many in Pakistan had expected a victory over the Indian military based on Pakistani official reports on the war, but were dismayed by the turn of events and questioned the eventual retreat. The military leadership is believed to have felt let down by the prime minister's decision to withdraw the remaining fighters. However, some authors, including Musharraf's close friend and former American CENTCOM Commander General Anthony Zinni, and former Prime minister Nawaz Sharif, state that it was General Musharraf who requested Sharif to withdraw Pakistani troops. In 2012, Musharraf's senior officer and retired major-general Abdul Majeed Malik maintained that Kargil was a "total disaster" and bitterly criticised General Musharraf. Pointing out the fact that Pakistan was in no position to fight India in that area; the Nawaz Sharif government initiated the diplomatic process by involving the US President Bill Clinton and got Pakistan out of the difficult scenario. Malik maintained the soldiers were not "Mujaheddin" but active-duty serving officers and soldiers of the Pakistan Army.

In a national security meeting with Prime minister Nawaz Sharif at the Joint Headquarters, General Musharraf became heavily involved with serious altercations with Chief of Naval Staff Admiral Fasih Bokhari who ultimately called for a court-martial against General Musharraf. With Sharif placing the onus of the Kargil attacks squarely on the army chief Pervez Musharraf, there was an atmosphere of uneasiness between the two. On 12 October 1999, General Musharraf staged a bloodless coup d'état, ousting Nawaz Sharif.

Benazir Bhutto, an opposition leader in the parliament and former prime minister, called the Kargil War "Pakistan's greatest blunder". Many ex-officials of the military and the Inter-Services Intelligence (Pakistan's principal intelligence agency) also believed "Kargil was a waste of time" and "could not have resulted in any advantage" on the larger issue of Kashmir. Retired Pakistani Lieut. Gen. Ali Kuli Khan lambasted the war as "a disaster bigger than the East Pakistan tragedy", adding that the plan was "flawed in terms of its conception, tactical planning and execution" that ended in "sacrificing so many soldiers". The Pakistani media criticised the whole plan and the eventual climbdown from the Kargil heights since there were no gains to show for the loss of lives and it only resulted in international condemnation.

Despite calls by many, no public commission of inquiry was set up in Pakistan to investigate the people responsible for initiating the conflict. The Pakistan Muslim League (PML(N)) published a white paper in 2006, which stated that Nawaz Sharif constituted an inquiry committee that recommended a court martial for General Pervez Musharraf, but Musharraf "stole the report" after toppling the government to save himself. The report also claims India knew about the plan 11 months before its launch, enabling a complete victory for India on the military, diplomatic and economic fronts. In June 2008 former X Corps commander and Director-General of Military Intelligence (M.I.) at the time, Lieutenant-General (retired) Jamshed Gulzar Kiani said: "As Prime minister, Nawaz Sharif "was never briefed by the army" on the Kargil attack", which reignited the demand for a probe into the episode by legal and political groups.

Nawaz Sharif told NDTV in 2007 that Musharraf was responsible for "derailing the process of normalisation of relations between Pakistan and India" by subverting the whole process.

Brigadier Imtiaz Ahmed, former director-general of the Intelligence Bureau, told Arab News in 2009 that Musharraf "never cared" to take his commanders or the air and naval chiefs into confidence before initiating the conflict. He also stated Musharraf's operation did the "biggest harm" to Pakistan as the conflict brought the US closer to India and turned Pakistan into a secondary player in South Asia. He said the country was diplomatically isolated. He also supported the formation of a "Kargil commission" akin to India's Kargil Review Committee.

Though the Kargil conflict had brought the Kashmir dispute into international focus, which was one of Pakistan's aims, it had done so in negative circumstances that eroded its credibility, since the infiltration came just after a peace process between the two countries had been concluded. The sanctity of the LOC too received international recognition. President Clinton's move to ask Islamabad to withdraw hundreds of armed militants from Indian-administered Kashmir was viewed by many in Pakistan as indicative of a clear shift in US policy against Pakistan. According to Bruce Riedel, President Clinton "did not hesitate to blame Pakistan for risking a broader war." He also warned Nawaz Sharif he would speak out about Pakistan's "coddling of Al-Qaida and Osama bin Laden."

After the war, a few changes were made to the Pakistan armed forces. In recognition of the Northern Light Infantry's performance in the war, which even drew praise from a retired Indian Lt. General, the regiment was incorporated into the regular army. The war showed that despite a tactically sound plan that had the element of surprise, little groundwork was done to gauge the political ramifications. And like previous unsuccessful infiltrations attempts, such as Operation Gibraltar, which sparked the 1965 war, there was little co-ordination or information sharing among the branches of the Pakistani Armed Forces. One US Intelligence study is reported to have stated that Kargil was yet another example of Pakistan's (lack of) grand strategy, repeating the follies of the previous wars. In 2013, General Musharraf's close collaborator and confidential subordinate Lieutenant General (retired) Shahid Aziz revealed to Pakistan's news televisions and electronic media that "[Kargil] adventure' was India's intelligence failure and Pakistan's miscalculated move, the Kargil operation was known only to General Parvez Musharraf and four of his close collaborators". In May 2024, while presiding over a PML-N general council meeting, Nawaz Sharif stated that Pakistan "violated" the agreement between him and then Indian PM Atal Bihari Vajpayee while referring to the Lahore Declaration.

== Analysis ==
Journalist Nasim Zehra, in her book, From Kargil to the Coup, calls Musharraf and those who were privy to his plans, including Chief of General Staff Aziz Khan, General Javed Hassan, and the then Commander 10 Corps Mahmud Ahmed the "Kargil Clique." She criticised these generals stating that they "planned operation KP (Koh Paima) less as intelligent and accountable strategists" and more "as covert, unaccountable campaigners." According to her, Nawaz Sharif was given "deceptive briefings" on the plans. She claims the "Clique" was pushing Pakistan and Sharif to do completely opposite to what Sharif was trying to achieve through the dialogue process initiated subsequent to the Indian PM's visit to Lahore in February 1999. She also claims the generals had no plans for when India struck back.

Bruce Riedel, who was the special Assistant to the US President and Senior Director for Near East and South Asia Affairs in the National Security Council at the time, concluded the US' "refusal to give Pakistan any reward for its aggression had an immediate and dynamic impact" on the US-India relationship. According to him, New Delhi's perception towards US changed and there were back to back summits between President Clinton and Indian PM Vajpayee. Riedel wrote that Clinton's visit to India "symbolised a new level of maturity in the relationship."

== Casualties ==
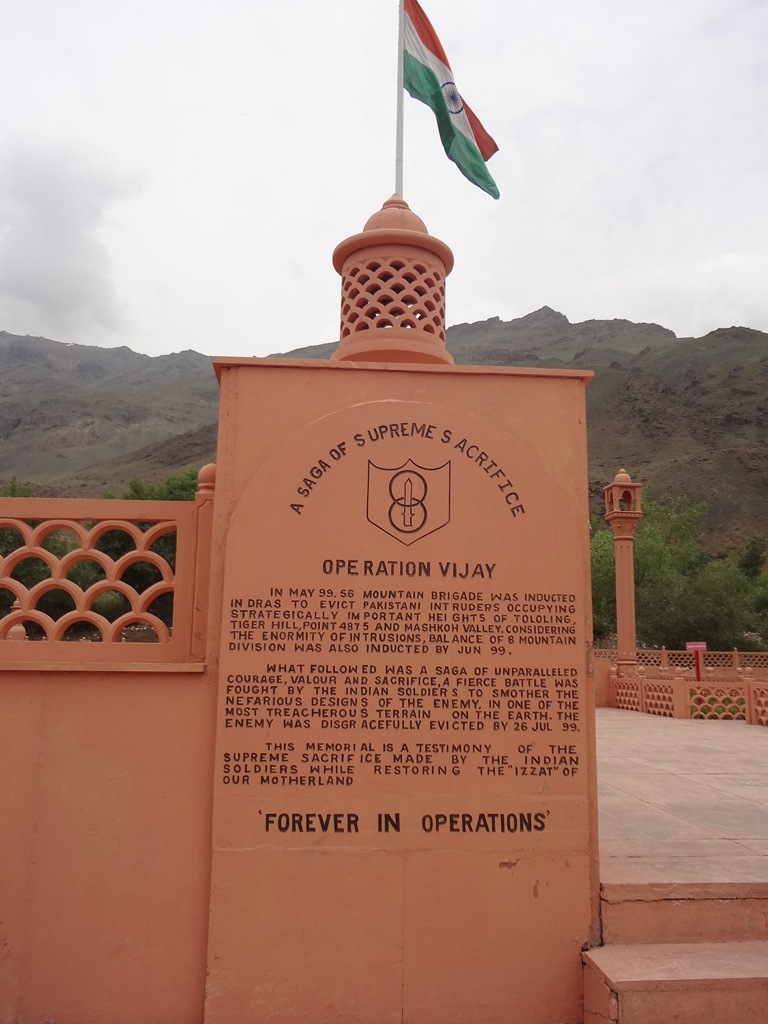
Memorial of Operation Vijay

Pakistani casualties have been difficult to determine due to multiple figures being provided by various sources. Pervez Musharraf stated that 357 soldiers were killed. The US Department of State had made an early, partial estimate of close to 700 fatalities.

According to numbers stated by Nawaz Sharif, there were over 4,000 fatalities. His PML (N) party in its "white paper" on the war mentioned more than 3,000 soldiers, officers and mujahideens were killed. Another major Pakistani political party, the Pakistan Peoples Party, also said "thousands" of soldiers and irregulars died.

Indian estimates stand at 1,042 Pakistani soldiers killed. Musharraf, in his Hindi version of his memoirs, titled "Agnipath", differs from all the estimates stating that 357 troops were killed with a further 665 wounded. Additionally, Pakistan also refused to claim some dead soldiers. Five unknown soldiers who were dead for at least ten days were buried at a spot referred to as "Gun Hill." A Muslim cleric from the Indian army presided over the funeral rites. In 2004, India asked Pakistan to collect the bodies of more than a hundred soldiers. While many remains were repatriated through diplomatic channels over the years, there were some notable cases in which identified bodies too remained unclaimed. These included Captain Farhat Haseeb Haider (9 Punjab/7 NLI), Major Abdul Wahab (32 Baloch/6 NLI), and Captain Muhammad Ammar Hussain (1 Commando Battalion, SSG).

Apart from General Musharraf's figure on the number of Pakistanis wounded, the number of people injured in the Pakistan camp is not yet fully known although they are at least more than 400 according to the Pakistan Army's website. According to Imtiaz Ahmed, "Musharraf never gave the exact number of Pakistan army casualties" to Nawaz Sharif.

In case of PoWs, one Indian pilot was officially captured during the fighting, while there were eight Pakistan army personnel who were captured during the war, and all of them were repatriated on 13 August 1999.

The official casualty figures of India were given to be 527 dead and 1,363 wounded.

== Kargil War Memorial, India ==
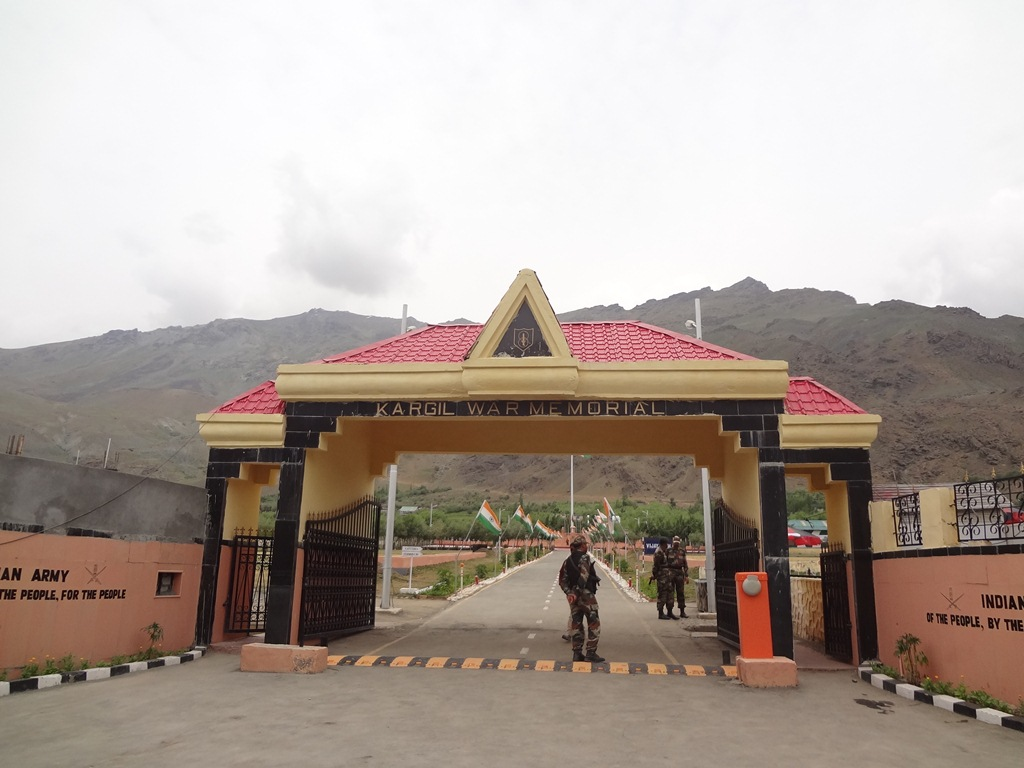
The main entrance of Kargil War Memorial by the Indian Army at Dras, India

The Kargil War memorial, built by the Indian Army, is located in Dras, at the foothills of Tololing Hill. The memorial, located about 5 km from the city centre across the Tiger Hill, commemorates the martyrs of the Kargil War. A poem "Pushp Kii Abhilasha" (Wish of a Flower) by Makhanlal Chaturvedi, a renowned 20th century neo-romantic Hindi poet, is inscribed on the gateway of the memorial greeting visitors. The names of the soldiers who lost their lives in the War are inscribed on the Memorial Wall. A museum attached to the Kargil War Memorial, which was established to celebrate the victory of Operation Vijay, houses pictures of Indian soldiers, archives of important war documents and recordings, Pakistani war equipments and gear, as well as official emblems of the Army from the Kargil war.

A giant national flag, weighing 15 kg was hoisted at the Kargil war memorial on Kargil Vijay Diwas to commemorate the 13th anniversary of India's victory in the war.

== Popular culture ==
- Lord John Marbury is a 1999 episode in the first season of The West Wing which depicts a fictionalised representation of the Kargil conflict.
- Pentagram's single, 'Price of Bullets', released in 1999 dealt with the Kargil War.
- Shaheed-E-Kargil (2001), a Hindi movie directed by Dilip Gulati was released in 2001, based on the incident of Kargil conflict.
- LOC: Kargil (2003), a Hindi movie which depicts many incidents from the war was one of the longest in Indian movie history, running for more than four hours.
- Lakshya (2004), another Hindi movie portraying a fictionalised account of the conflict. Movie critics have generally appreciated the realistic portrayal of characters. The film also received good reviews in Pakistan because it portrays both sides fairly.
- Sainika (2002), a Kannada film directed by Mahesh Sukhdhare depicted the life of a soldier with Kargil war as one of the events. Starring C. P. Yogishwar and Sakshi Shivanand.
- Dhoop (2003), Hindi film directed by Ashwini Chaudhary depicted the life of Anuj Nayyar's parents after his death. Anuj Nayyar was a captain in the Indian army and was awarded Maha Vir Chakra posthumously. Om Puri plays the role of S.K. Nayyar, Anuj's father.
- Mission Fateh – Real Stories of Kargil Heroes, a TV series telecast on Sahara channel chronicling the Indian Army's missions.
- Fifty Day War – A theatrical production on the war, directed by Aamir Raza Husain, the title indicating the length of the Kargil conflict. This was claimed to be the biggest production of its kind in Asia, budget of Rs. 15 million, involving real aircraft and explosions in an outdoor setting.
- Kurukshetra (2008) – A Malayalam film directed by a former Indian Army Major Ravi (Retd) based on his experience of Kargil War.
- Laag (2000) – A Pakistani film-drama based on the armed intrusions and struggle of Pakistan army soldiers in the conflict.
- Kargil Kartoons (1999) – With the support of eight leading cartoonists, Shekhar Gurera compiled a collection of cartoons dedicated to the Indian defence forces. He also coordinated Kargil Kartoons (A Collection of Cartoons and a chain of Cartoon Exhibition), the solidarity gesture of drawing on-the-spot cartoons of army men who passing through the New Delhi railway station on their way to Kargil. The cartoons on Kargil War were later exhibited at The Lalit Kala Academy, New Delhi. 25–31 July 1999, followed by the chain exhibition of cartoons at Jaipur, Chandigarh, Patna and Indore.
- Stumped (2003) – A film expressing the mixed emotions of 1999 Cricket World Cup celebrations and mourning associated with individual's casualty in the Kargil war.
- Mausam (2011), romantic drama film directed by Pankaj Kapoor, spanned over the period between 1992 and 2002 covering major events.
- Gunjan Saxena: The Kargil Girl (2020) – An Indian biographical film was based on life of Indian Air Force pilot Gunjan Saxena, the first Indian female air force pilot in combat during Kargil War.
- Shershaah (2021) – An Indian war film based on life of Indian army captain Vikram Batra, recipient of the Param Vir Chakra.
- Laal Singh Chaddha (2022), an Indian remake of Forrest Gump.
- Operation Safed Sagar (2026), Netflix-produced six-episode miniseries about a unit of Indian Air Force fighter pilots deployed to the war

The impact of the war in the sporting arena was visible during the India-Pakistan clash in the 1999 Cricket World Cup, which coincided with the Kargil timeline. The game witnessed heightened passions and was one of the most viewed matches in the tournament.

== See also ==
- Indo-Pakistani wars and conflicts
- Gudiya, Kargil war victim
- Kambampati Nachiketa, Prisoner of war
- Battle of Point 4875

== Footnotes ==
- ^ Note (I): Names for the conflict: There have been various names for the conflict. During the actual fighting in Kargil, the Indian Government was careful not to use the term "war", calling it a "war-like situation", even though both nations indicated that they were in a "state of war". Terms like Kargil "conflict", Kargil "incident" or the official military assault, "Operation Vijay", were thus preferred. After the end of the war however, the Indian Government increasingly called it the "Kargil War", even though there had been no official declaration of war. Other less popularly used names included "Third Kashmir War" and Pakistan's codename given to the infiltration: "Operation Badr".

== Bibliography ==
- Malik, V. P. (2006). Kargil: From Surprise to Victory. HarperCollins. ISBN 9788172236359.
