= 78 =

78 may refer to:

- 78 (number), the natural number following 77 and preceding 79
- one of the years 78 BC, AD 78, 1978, 2078
- 78 RPM phonograph (gramophone) record
- The 78, a proposed urban development in Chicago, Illinois, US
- 78 Diana, a main-belt asteroid

== See also ==
- 78th (disambiguation)
- '78 (disambiguation)
- 78ers, a group of LGBTQ activists
- List of highways numbered 78
