= Kambampati Nachiketa =

Indian Air Force pilot captured by Pakistani forces during the 1999 Kargil War

Group Captain Kambhampati Nachiketa
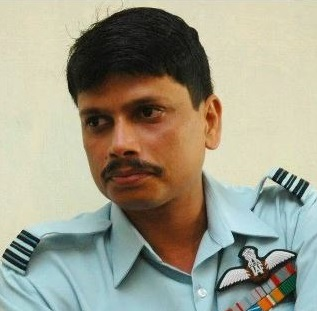
- Nachiketa wearing a squadron leader's rank epaulette
- Born: 30 May 1973 (age 53); Hyderabad
- Military career
- Allegiance: India
- Branch: Indian Air Force
- Service years: 1994 – 2017
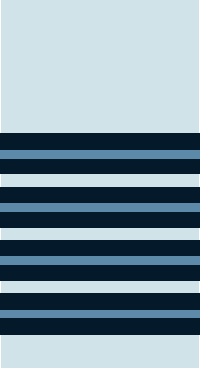
- Rank: Group Captain
- Nickname: Nachi
- Units: No. 9 Squadron No. 48 Squadron No. 78 Squadron
- Conflicts: Kargil War
- Awards: Vayusena Medal

Kambhampati Nachiketa VM is a retired Group Captain of the Indian Air Force. While carrying out an airstrike on Pakistani positions in the Batalik sector during the Kargil War, his aircraft suffered an engine failure. Nachiketa was ejected from his Mikoyan MiG-27 and was taken into Pakistani custody by a platoon led by Captain Rao Tahseen Ali of the 5 NLI. He is currently a pilot for commercial airlines.

== Early life ==
Nachiketa was born on 30 May 1973 to Sri. K. R. K. Sastri and Smt. KSM. Laxmi. He studied at Kendriya Vidyalaya RK Puram Sect 8 in Delhi, and joined the National Defence Academy, Khadakwasla.

== Kargil War ==
During the Kargil War, Nachiketa was a flight lieutenant and a Mikoyan MiG-27 pilot from No. 9 Squadron IAF (Wolfpack) who took part in a strike in the Batalik Sector on 27 May 1999. Using the callsign Hyena-2 as a part of a four aircraft formation his MiG-27 was armed with 80mm rockets and the aircraft's guns he successfully carried out strikes against enemy camps. However following his strafing run his plane suffered a sudden engine failure and Nachiketa was forced to eject.

After ejecting, Nachiketa evaded immediate capture but after an ambush and exchange of fire with the enemy soldiers, a Pakistani army patrol captured him. Nachiketa continued to fire his service pistol until he ran out of bullets. After his capture he was beaten up by Pakistani soldiers until Captain Rao Tahseen Ali 5 NLI intervened. Speaking to NDTV in 2016, Nachiketa said:

The jawans who had captured me were trying to manhandle me and maybe trying to kill me because, for them, I was just an enemy pilot who had fired on their locations from the air... Fortunately, the officer who came was very mature. He realised the situation that I am now a captive and now I need not be handled that way. So he was able to control them, which was a big effort because they were very aggressive at that stage.

== Life as a prisoner ==
Nachiketa remained a prisoner of war for eight days. He was first taken to an undisclosed location in the Batalik. After a two-hour wait, he was taken by helicopter to Skardu.

He also had an interaction with the Director of Operations of the Pakistan Air Force, Group Captain Kaiser Tufail. This interrogation was called "very civil" by Tufail, who said it was a casual talk between two officers rather than between a captor and a prisoner of war. Tufail said his mandate was to inquire into the circumstances of the ejection and the mission.

== Repatriation ==
Nachiketa was handed over to the International Committee of the Red Cross in Pakistan and was subsequently repatriated over the Indian border check post at Attari on the Amritsar-to-Lahore road on 3 June 1999. Nachiketa described his experiences in captivity as "difficult to be described in words" and said he sometimes felt "death would have been a better option".

== Subsequent career ==
Nachiketa was promoted to group captain and flew Ilyushin Il-78 mid-air refuelling transport aircraft with No. 78 Squadron IAF, stationed at Agra. He suffers from long-term back pain due to an injury sustained during a parachute landing in the war.

After retirement from the IAF as a group captain, Nachiketa joined as an airline pilot, serving as a captain flying the Airbus A320neo.

Vayusena Medal	Operation Vijay Star	Operation Vijay Medal	Special Service Medal
Sainya Seva Medal	High Altitude Service Medal	50th Anniversary of Independence Medal	9 Years Long Service Medal
