= 78th Division =

In military terms, 78th Division or 78th Infantry Division may refer to:

== Infantry divisions ==
- 78th Division (People's Republic of China), 1952–1954; later the Inner Changshan Garrison Division
- 78th Division (2nd Formation) (People's Republic of China), 1969–1985
- 78th Reserve Division (German Empire), Imperial German Army
- 78th Infantry Division (Wehrmacht), Germany
- 78th Infantry Division (Russian Empire)
- 78th Guards Rifle Division, Soviet Union
- 78th Motor Rifle Division, Soviet Union
- 78th Rifle Division, Soviet Union
- 78th Infantry Division (United Kingdom)
- 78th Division (United States)

== Armoured divisions ==
- 78th Tank Division, Soviet Union

== See also ==
- 78th Division Highway
- List of military divisions by number
- 78th Brigade (disambiguation)
- 78th Regiment (disambiguation)
- 78th Squadron (disambiguation)
