= Ashraf Rashid =

Pakistani military officer (1948–2004)

Major General Ashraf Rashid
- Born: Ashraf Rashid; 23 May 1948; Lahore, Punjab, Dominion of Pakistan
- Died: 2 October 2004 (aged 56); Lahore, Punjab, Pakistan
- Military career
- Allegiance: Pakistan
- Branch: Pakistan Army
- Service years: 1964–1999
- Rank: Major General
- Unit: Special Service Group
- Commands: Col. Com. SSG; DG Military Operations (DGMO)
- Conflicts: Indo-Pakistani War of 1965; Indo-Pakistani War of 1971; Siachen conflict; Kargil War
- Awards: Nishan-e-Imtiaz Hilal-e-Imtiaz

Ashraf Rashid (Punjabi, Urdu: أشرف رشيد) (23 May 1948 – 2 October 2004) was a two-star general in the Pakistan Army and the colonel commandant of the Special Service Group division within the Pakistan Army from October 1995 to September 1999. A career army special forces officer, he was responsible for conducting paramilitary operations and infiltrating Kashmiri militants on the Indian side of the Line of Control, which subsequently led to the Kargil War. He resigned from his post in September 1999 following the intense pressure on Pakistan from international community to withdraw its military forces from Kargil.

== Military career ==
Before becoming Commander of the Special Service Group commando division, Rashid was Director General of Military Operations, succeeding Jehangir Karamat, who became Chief of Army Staff.

== Kargil War and resignation ==
As head of the Special Service Group, the special operations division, Rashid helped Kashmiri militants infiltrate the Indian side of the line of control in the Kargil district of Kashmir, where his division conducted covert operations. Only Rashid, then army chief of staff Pervez Musharraf and two other generals knew about the operation.

The event marked the beginning of the Kargil War, which ended with defeat and eventual withdrawal of the Pakistan Army from their occupied positions in Kargil. After being pressured by the US. Rashid's role in initiating the conflict and increased political pressure led to his resignation in September 1999.

== Death ==
General Rashid died of a heart attack in his home in Lahore, on 2 October 2004.
