= No. 114 Helicopter Unit, IAF =

No. 114 Helicopter Unit
- Active: 1 April 1964 – present
- Country: Republic of India
- Branch: Indian Air Force
- Garrison/HQ: Leh AFS
- Nickname(s): "Siachen Pioneers"
- Motto(s): Dussadhyam Kimsadhyam Kinnah; Nothing is Difficult or Impossible for us

Aircraft flown
- Transport: HAL Chetak; HAL Cheetah

No. 114 Helicopter Unit (Siachen Pioneers) is a Helicopter Unit and is equipped with HAL Cheetah and based at Leh Air Force Station, for operations on the Siachen Glacier.

== History ==
The unit was formed with an establishment of 10 Alouette helicopters. This unit had the distinction of being the first all-Chetak unit raised in the IAF.

No. 114 Helicopter Unit was raised under the command of Squadron Leader Arvind Dalaya, who had earlier pioneered the IAF's Mi-4 operations in high-altitude terrain. Under his leadership, the unit became India's first dedicated high-altitude helicopter unit, operating extensively in Ladakh and the North-East.

Since the mid-1980s, 114 Helicopter Unit has been the IAF's lead operator in the Siachen Glacier region, flying critical resupply and CASEVAC missions under extreme high-altitude conditions. The unit's performance in this hostile environment has earned it the nickname "Siachen Pioneers".

The President's Colour Award has been bestowed upon this Unit in recognition of exceptional service rendered to the nation on 13 November 1996.

=== Assignments ===
- Indo-Pakistani War of 1965

=== Aircraft ===
- HAL Chetak
- HAL Cheetah
