= 78th Division (2nd Formation) (People's Republic of China) =

78th Army Division (1969-85)
- Active: 1969 - 1985
- Country: People's Republic of China
- Branch: People's Liberation Army
- Type: Division
- Role: Infantry
- Part of: 26th Army Corps

78th Army Division(Chinese: 陆军第78师)(2nd Formation) was formed in late 1969 and designated in December.

The division was a part of 26th Army Corps. During its existence the division was composed of:

- 232nd Infantry Regiment;
- 233rd Infantry Regiment;
- 234th Infantry Regiment;
- Artillery Regiment.

In 1985 the division was inactivated and converted to Artillery Brigade, 26th Army.
