= No. 78 Squadron IAF =

No. 78 Squadron
- Active: March 2003- Present
- Country: India
- Role: Aerial refueling
- Garrison/HQ: Agra AFS
- Nickname: "Battle-cry"
- Motto: ?

Aircraft flown
- Transport: Il-78 MKI

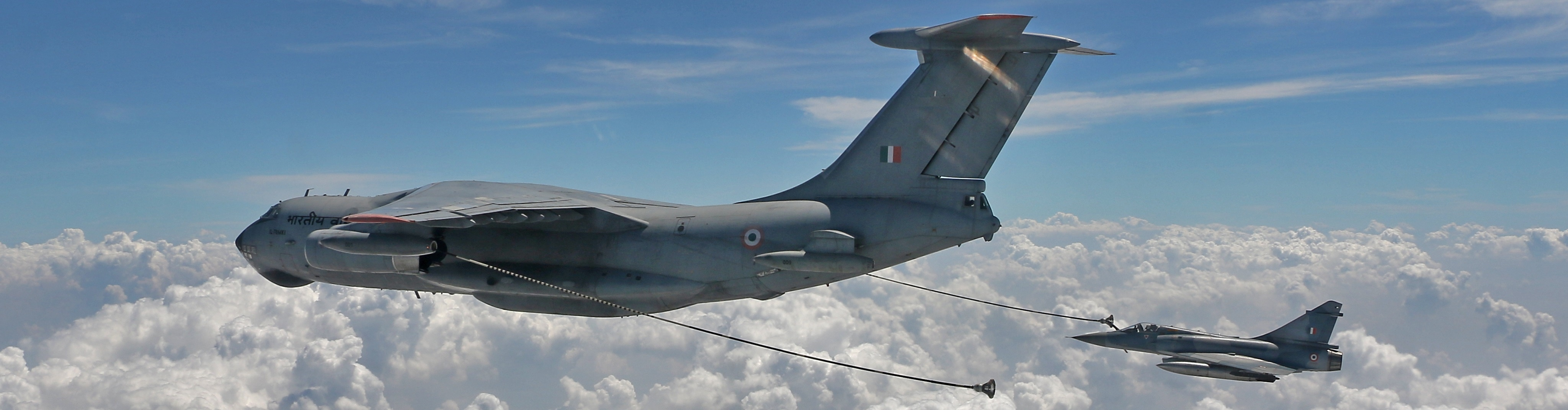
IL-78 MKI aerial refueling Mirage-2000

No. 78 Squadron is located at Agra AFS under Central Air Command. The IL-78s, which refuel at the rate of 500–600 litres a minute, can ferry up to 118 tonnes of fuel, and can simultaneously fill three air-borne fighter aircraft, and allowing the fighters to carry more pay load and penetrate deep into the enemy territories.

== History ==
The No. 78 Squadron were raised in 2003 with Il-78 MKI Aircraft at Agra and moved to the present location. MARS stand for 'Mid Air Refueling Squadron'

=== Lineage ===
- Constituted as No. 78 Squadron (Battle-cry) in 2003

=== Aircraft ===
- Il-78
