= 78th Regiment =

78th Regiment or 78th Infantry Regiment may refer to:

- 78th Regiment of Foot (disambiguation), several units of the British Army
- 78th Moplah Rifles, a regiment of the British Indian Army
- 78th Infantry Regiment (Imperial Japanese Army)
- 78th Independent Infantry Regiment (North Korea)
- 78th Field Artillery Regiment, a unit of the US Army

American Civil War:

- 78th Illinois Infantry Regiment, a unit of the Union (Northern) Army
- 78th Indiana Infantry Regiment, a unit of the Union (Northern) Army
- 78th New York Infantry Regiment, a unit of the Union (Northern) Army and nicknamed the 78th Highlanders in reference to the British units
- 78th Ohio Infantry Regiment, a unit of the Union (Northern) Army
- 78th Pennsylvania Infantry Regiment, a unit of the Union (Northern) Army

== See also ==
- 78th Division (disambiguation)
- 78 Squadron (disambiguation)
